= Newman and Baddiel =

Former comedy partnership

Newman and Baddiel were a comedy partnership of the 1990s consisting of British stand-up comics Robert Newman and David Baddiel.

Both graduated from Cambridge University and began working separately as stand-up comedians before they were introduced to one another in 1989 by producer Bill Dare, who wanted to put together a topical sketch show for BBC Radio 1. The new writing duo joined Steve Punt and Hugh Dennis to form the core quartet of The Mary Whitehouse Experience, which later transferred successfully to BBC television and made stars of both pairings.

There followed a series for BBC2 called Newman and Baddiel in Pieces. The series was a ratings success, despite coming under criticism from reviewers who considered the comedy to be too deep and perceived a notable absence of camaraderie between the two performers. There was a particularly vindictive round of correspondence sent to Private Eye regarding the duo, heralding a one-off letters page entitled The Great Newman & Baddiel Debate.

They embarked on a sell-out UK tour (featuring stand-up from each and reprises of characters from the TV show) and this culminated in a memorable gig at Wembley Arena which was full to its 12,000 capacity, the first time this had been achieved by comedians. This was to be their final performance together; shortly afterwards, the two parted as co-performers due to artistic differences.

Newman became a novelist, activist and anti-capitalism campaigner and rarely returned to comedy until more recently, having frequently toured with Mark Thomas. Meanwhile, Baddiel established a new (and notably more laddish) comedy partnership with Frank Skinner on Fantasy Football League and, later, Baddiel and Skinner Unplanned, as well as the number one single "Three Lions".
