= Punt and Dennis =

English comedy act

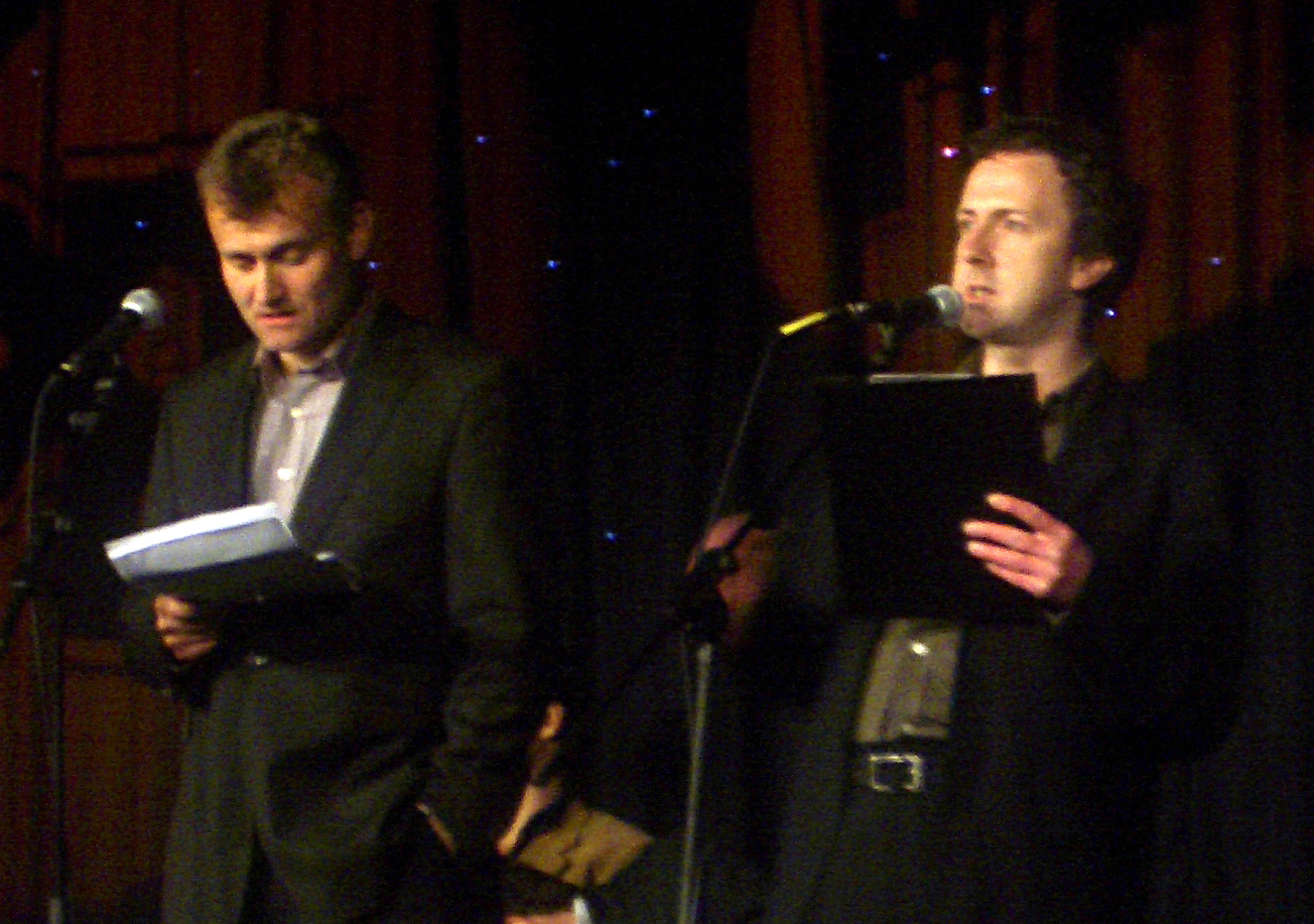
- Hugh Dennis and Steve Punt on The Now Show.
- Notable work: The Mary Whitehouse Experience; The Party Line; The Now Show

Comedy career
- Years active: 1980's-present (intermittent)
- Medium: Television, radio
- Genres: Sketch comedy Political satire
- Subjects: Politics, current events

Punt and Dennis are a comedy double act consisting of Steve Punt and Hugh Dennis. The duo first met at the Footlights while studying at Cambridge University in the early 1980s. Initially they were an amateur double act performing at various venues in London on the weekends due to Dennis' weekday job commitments, now amateurs with somework on Radio 4, or doing Public Information Films. They have branched into acting and screenwriting.

== Works ==
=== Radio and television ===
Punt and Dennis first appeared on television in Jasper Carrott's shows during the late 1980s. They were two of the four main performers in The Mary Whitehouse Experience, a comedy show on BBC Radio 1 which then transferred to television. While the other two stars of the series, Rob Newman and David Baddiel, became major celebrities — playing to sell-out audiences at Wembley Arena—Punt and Dennis never attained the same level of prominence as a double act. Their own TV series, The Imaginatively Titled Punt & Dennis Show, did not meet the same success as The Mary Whitehouse Experience, but won larger audiences and was given a higher profile than the other pairing's spin-off project Newman and Baddiel in Pieces.

The duo continued to collaborate despite each having forged their own separate careers — Dennis as a panellist and presenter and Punt as a screenwriter. Their more prominent works include long-running radio shows It's Been a Bad Week (BBC Radio 2) and BBC Radio 4 shows The Party Line and The Now Show from 1998 to 2024. They also contribute to the satirical hit panel game Mock the Week. Punt was a programme associate while Dennis was a regular panellist alongside Frankie Boyle and later Chris Addison.

In 2024 the duo presented the comedy series Route Masters - From Beer to Eternity on BBC Radio 4, in which, over ten episodes, they discussed various interconnected trivia on places, people and topics, starting from the village of Beer in the English county of Devon, finally arriving at the series destination of 'Eternity'. Each episode featured a celebrity guest who contributed to the discussion.

=== Other ===
In 1992 they went on the road themselves and toured the UK with a show called 'Punt And Dennis - The Milky Milky Tour'. The name of the show was inspired by a character called Mr Strange that Hugh Dennis played in The Mary Whitehouse Experience. The Milky Milky tour was filmed live on stage at Bristol's Hippodrome Theatre in 1992 and released on VHS Video.

In 2007 they performed a UK tour of their comedy called Stuff and Nonsense. In 2010 they announced November 2010 preview shows and a new tour for 2011 (that was titled 'They Should Get Out More') which ran from January to March. In 2014 they embarked on a new UK comedy tour called 'Ploughing on Regardless'. In 2024 they toured a new show called Punt and Dennis: We Are Not A Robot.
