= Live on Arrival =

BBC Radio 4 comedy series

Live on Arrival is a BBC Radio 4 series of six episodes aired in 1988. It was written by Steve Punt and featured Punt together with Hugh Dennis, Flip Webster and Guy Jackson. The format was narrative-based and featured surreal parodies and topical comment, broadcast live-to-air from the Paris Studio in London. A second series was commissioned but, owing to the start of The Mary Whitehouse Experience in 1989, never made. Punt and Dennis proved a successful comedy team and elements of the format survived in a more refined form as The Now Show, which began ten years later.

The pilot was produced and directed by David Tyler.
