= Jake Yapp =

British comedian

- Born: Jacob Yapp; United Kingdom
- Occupations: composer; comedian; writer
- Years active: 1994–present
- Television: The Hurting
- Website: jakeyapp.co.uk

Jacob Yapp is a British comedian, composer, and writer.

== Career ==
Jacob Yapp first appeared in the mid-1990s on Martin Kelner's radio shows on BBC North and Jazz FM, playing the character Dame Dora Dale. The character returned to radio in 2006 on the award-winning BBC 7 show Pleased to Meet You. Two new episodes were broadcast by BBC Radio 4 Extra over Christmas 2011.

Yapp was a writer for the 1997-98 series TV Offal, and contributed to Nuts TV in 2007.

A semi-finalist in the 2000 Daily Telegraph Open Mic Award, Yapp performed at the Edinburgh Fringe in 2008 (Bum Notes) and 2009 (Hallo, Music Lovers & Free at Four). He had a regular slot on BBC 6 Music's Shaun Keaveny breakfast show until July 2011. Yapp also created and performed The Chesney Bentings Mysteries for BBC Radio 2's Ken Bruce show as part of 2011's Comic Relief.

Beginning in August 2011, Yapp presented his own Friday and Saturday morning shows on BBC Radio Leeds which ran until December, 2012.

Yapp is well known for his YouTube parody of a day in the life of BBC Radio 4 titled 'Radio 4 in Four Minutes.' He has also contributed to BBC2's Charlie Brooker's Weekly Wipe and BBC Radio 4's The Now Show and has appeared on 8 Out of 10 Cats Does Countdown.

In the lead-up to the 2015 UK General Election, Yapp performed live on BBC2's Newsnight with musical renditions of political party manifestos, accompanied by Harry The Piano. He performed at the 2015 Camden Fringe alongside his brother Joe Yapp with a show titled Onederland, a satirical and musical examination of BBC One.

In 2016, he wrote and presented a series of short, comic histories of scientific knowledge on BBC Radio 4 titled Everything We've Ever Known About.... In 2016, Yapp began hosting Sunday breakfast on Talkradio, initially alongside Laura Shavin; he also regularly covered weekday shows. He performed his final show on the station on 14 January 2018.

Yapp wrote and voiced the new British reality motoring entertainment show Ronnie's Redneck Roadtrip, which was broadcast on Dave in the UK, and Kodi in the US in April 2017.

Yapp's newest live show, 'One in a Million', from Edinburgh Festival 2016, was restaged at the Soho Theatre in London in June 2017. Starting from November 2017, Yapp narrated the comedy clip show The Hurting broadcast on Dave.

In July and August 2018, 'Jake Yapp's Media Circus', a four-part satirical series, was broadcast on BBC radio.

Yapp regularly hosts the Comedy Club on BBC Radio 4 Extra.

Yapp is the co-host of Checkpoint Magazine Podcast and The Old Hex Podcast.

== Personal life ==
Yapp is the cousin of documentary filmmaker Will Yapp.
