= Newman and Baddiel in Pieces =

- Genre: Sketch comedy
- Directed by: Babara Jones
- Theme music composer: The Sundays
- Country of origin: United Kingdom
- Original language: English
- No. of series: 1
- No. of episodes: 7

Production
- Producer: Harry Thompson
- Production company: BBC

Original release
- Network: BBC2
- Release: 20 September – 20 December 1993

Newman and Baddiel in Pieces is a sketch comedy television show written by and starring comedians Robert Newman and David Baddiel, produced by Harry Thompson, and broadcast on BBC2 from 20 September to 20 December 1993.

A spin-off from The Mary Whitehouse Experience, the show combined monologues and observational routines from each of the two comedians (often with very dark themes) and character comedy. Its title sequence was an animated version of Munch's painting The Scream (to the tune of "Another Flavour" by The Sundays), with Newman and Baddiel revealed as the artist's friends in the background, standing near a waterfront theatre in which they were appearing. Audience applause between sketches was frequently accompanied by an animated theatre full of applauding The Scream characters.

The series was repeated under the title Newman and Baddiel: Rest in Pieces, with new title animation showing the duo lying in state in an open grave. The new titles were due to the Munch estate still owning copyright on the image of The Scream, as used on the original version.

== Characters and sketches ==
Newman and Baddiel both made observational comedy monologues to camera, in sets representing their respective flats. Their monologues were usually done independently from one another, but occasionally they would share scenes. The monologues were mingled with numerous sketches and recurring characters. These included:

=== Albert ===
Albert was an elderly "character actor" (played by Denys Graham) who would occasionally interrupt either of the performers to ask if he could play a role in the next sketch in order to earn money to pay for a dialysis machine for his daughter Sally, whose picture he would look at from within a locket. But against Albert's wishes, he was always cast in the role of a stunt double, which seemed particularly inappropriate given his frail, elderly physique and his reliance on a walking stick. In the final episode, Albert discovered that this supposed 'dialysis machine' was not actually a dialysis machine at all, but a vibrator.

=== The Poltergeist ===
The Poltergeist was an apparently evil spirit that haunted David Baddiel's flat. In each episode, the poltergeist would attempt to terrify the duo, but fail spectacularly (in one instance, when attempting to mess up the room by moving everything around, he ended up tidying up). In the last episode it was shown that David Baddiel was aware of the poltergeist's presence but was not remotely afraid of it as he called out 'Can you feed the cat please' when leaving on tour.

=== J.J. ===
J.J., played by Simon Greenall, was David Baddiel's new flatmate, introduced in the 4th episode when David asked Rob to bring him a flatmate in order to prove he could get along with other people easily despite Rob's claims to the contrary. Unfortunately, J.J. turned out to embody every personality trait that annoyed Baddiel, including the tendencies to say "da-daa!" and append "as you do!" to sentences.

=== Emma ===
Emma, played by Alison Goldie, was David Baddiel's girlfriend who often stayed over in his flat. Although Baddiel introduced their relationship in the first episode as a secure and idyllic one, it quickly became obvious that this was not the case. Through the series, David becomes gradually more suspicious that she is having an affair with another man, occasionally confiding his suspicions to Rob, unaware that Rob is the man in question.

=== Jarvis Montgomery ===
Played by Rob Newman, Jarvis was a predatory lothario in a smoking jacket who would cruise the streets of Soho looking for youthful partners to fulfil his lust, and making risqué double entendres which apparently shocked him ("Now I don't want to come over all Prince Charles... oh God!!!"). Standing in a dark alleyway, Jarvis would deliver a monologue in each episode detailing his latest debauched activities ("I must remember to try smuggling drugs through customs again", alluding to Jarvis's contentment at being body cavity searched, for instance). Newman continued to use this character in his early solo shows shortly after splitting from Baddiel. Jarvis would often conclude his monologue by leading the audience to an obvious punchline, then not delivering it, instead he would state "The fact that you expected me [to do x] and I disappointed you ... turned me on."

=== History Today ===
"History Today" was the only sketch from The Mary Whitehouse Experience reprised for the duo's own series. The sketch followed much the same format as before, of two elderly, scholarly professors introducing an historical discussion show on TV, which quickly turned into a barrage of playground-style insults and name-calling. Baddiel played the first of the two professors, who was never named but would introduce the topic of debate for each 'episode', while Newman played Professor F. J. Lewis, emeritus professor of history at All Souls' College, Oxford, who would always be the first to start the insults. The first professor would often try to return the discussion to the original topic of debate, but would never achieve much luck as Professor Lewis would continue nonetheless to fire endless playground insults at him, forcing the first professor to retaliate in kind. The humour lay largely in the manner in which the professors maintained their well-spoken, formal tones despite the childishness of their insults. Many of the sketches even began with Baddiel's character apologising to the viewer for the previous episode's diversion from the chosen topic. The series of sketches was the inspiration for numerous office/playground copycats to recite its catchphrase of "You see that <insert pathetic, broken, or obsolete object>? That's you that is." The series originated in a collection of improvised sketches which were released on a cassette accompanying a video of the two performing a stand-up show in Edinburgh, and the first televised performance largely followed the original improvised version, but without the helpless laughter into which it would descend.

The sketches may be a reference to the very public feuding between historians A.J.P. Taylor and Hugh Trevor-Roper on TV and in print in the 1960s.

=== People of Restricted Seriousness ===
Presented in a documentary-style format, this sketch detailed the lives of a group of people afflicted with a rare condition called Restricted Seriousness, which deformed parts of their bodies so that they appeared like novelty joke-shop items and thus caused them to be laughed at by the rest of society. The main character was Julius (played by Baddiel) whose nose appeared like a plastic joke-shop nose and together with his rug-like facial hair gave him an appearance remarkably like Groucho Marx, and interfered largely with his profession as an undertaker. Determined to be taken seriously by other people, Julius attended a weekly support group for people with the condition, which was run by an unnamed character played by Newman, whose plastic-looking bald head and fuzzy green hair gave him a 'nutty professor' appearance. Other significant characters in this sketch included Daniel, who has enormous joke-shop ears and hands which interfere with his work in a centre for the deaf, and Helen, Julius' girlfriend, who has plastic-looking 'breasts of Restricted Seriousness'.

=== Safety First ===
A short sketch in the form of a TV safety warning presented by a character named Brian Coat, played by Baddiel. Brian Coat was a humourless and over-zealous safety officer, in hard hat, who caused the accidents he was trying to prevent. He would willingly set up an accident, then state "Y'see, there was no need for that to happen!" before walking away from the scene completely unapologetically.

=== Disappearing World ===
Similar to the "Safety First" sketch, this short sketch took the form of a TV environmental warning presented by a character called Shenley Grange, played by comedian Sean Lock. In a similar fashion to the latter sketch, Shenley Grange would issue a warning about a particular endangered species, before executing some kind of action himself that would end up killing the animals featured.

=== MTV Unplugged ===
This sketch was a parody of the MTV Unplugged phenomenon, in which the duo would turn up pretending to be techno acts The Orb or Utah Saints, and would look embarrassedly at the audience as an unplugged version of their style of music was, in fact, complete silence.

=== Special Case ===
In a series of sketches in one episode of the series (later revived for the duo's tour), Newman played a mentally unstable man with a condition which would cause him to suddenly shout out loud in public or do whatever was the most inappropriate action for the situation he was involved in. These included shadow-boxing a local gang, shouting "You absolute prostitute!" at his girlfriend when trying to console her, and repeatedly throwing his boss' hat out of a top-story window in his workplace. However, the constant muttering of the character was revealed not to be him wrestling with his "internal demons", but rather having a crisis of self-confidence ("Oh, I just know I'm gonna shout something out and it's gonna be so embarrassing!").

== Celebrity guests ==
Over the show's seven episodes, several celebrity guests were featured, one of whom was Bullseye scorer and darts commentator Tony Green in a cameo, reprising his calming schtick used on the Bullseye contestants prior to an important round, with the intention this time of getting the insomniac Baddiel to sleep. Other celebrities who appeared on the show included Mariella Frostrup, Robert Smith (of British rock band The Cure, whom Newman had previously parodied on The Mary Whitehouse Experience), Jimmy Hill and Suzi Quatro, all playing themselves.

== Critical review ==
The characters were tepidly received by critics; however, the stand-up comedy was roundly slammed for being too morbid, self-indulgent and unfunny. The two rarely performed any non-character material together, suggesting little writing as a partnership, and the comedy output suffered. Tension was evident between the pairing too, and this was confirmed when they announced they would no longer be working together at the conclusion of the "Live and in Pieces" tour that followed the series.

The other duo from The Mary Whitehouse Experience, Punt and Dennis (Steve Punt and Hugh Dennis), also wrote and presented their own sketch show, called The Imaginatively Titled Punt & Dennis Show. This, despite getting a more mainstream slot on BBC1, was not too well received either, though it was not subjected to the same vitriol that some critics laid at Newman and Baddiel, which famously led to Private Eye printing a special letters page from their correspondence on the show, entitled The Great Newman & Baddiel Debate.

Newman and Baddiel have not worked together since the show ended. Newman became a successful novelist, activist and anti-capitalism campaigner; Baddiel joined forces with Frank Skinner for a number of successful TV and music projects and also wrote three novels.
