= John-Henry Phillips =

English archaeologist and filmmaker (born 1991)

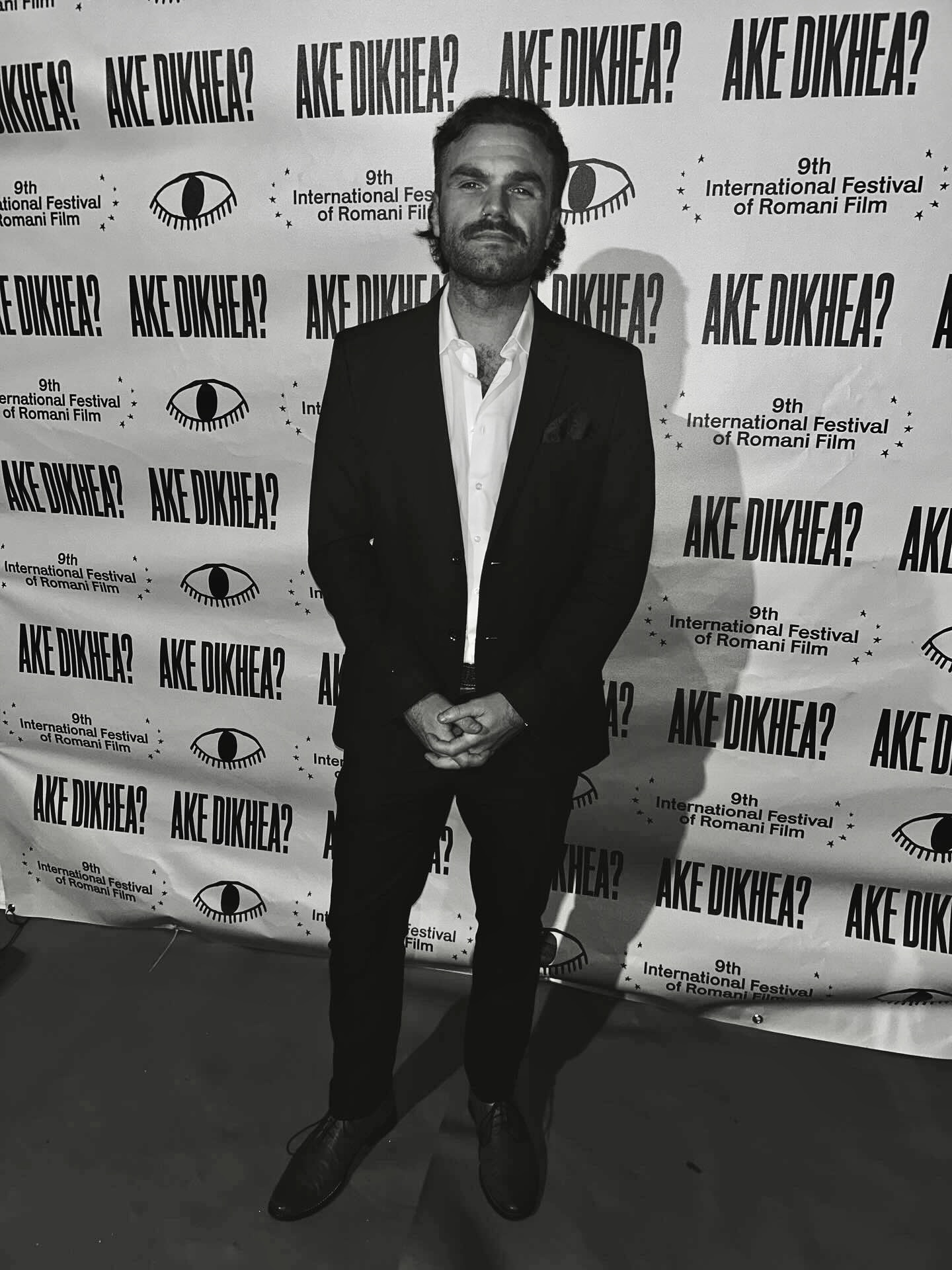
- Phillips in 2025
- Born: 15 November 1991 (age 34); Bury St. Edmunds, England
- Education: Bachelor of Arts, Master of Arts
- Alma mater: University of Leicester
- Occupations: Author, archaeologist, filmmaker, television presenter
- Years active: 2016–present
- Known for: Archaeology, human rights
- Notable work: The Search, No Roses on a Sailor's Grave, Romani Community Archaeology
- Television: The Great British Dig, Digging For Britain
- Awards: Fellow of The Society of Antiquaries of London

John-Henry Phillips FSA (born 15 November 1991) is a British author, archaeologist, filmmaker and television presenter.

== Early life and education ==
Phillips was born in Bury St. Edmunds, England. He graduated university with a Bachelor's degree in Archaeology in 2016 and a Master's degree in Human rights in 2022, both from the University of Leicester. He is a Doctoral Researcher at the University of Huddersfield's Centre of Archaeology.

== Career ==
Phillips began his career as a commercial archaeologist in 2016. In 2017, he launched a project to locate the wreck of LCH 185, a D-Day Landing craft sunk off the coast of Normandy, and build a memorial to its crew, alongside Patrick Thomas, the last survivor of its sinking. Phillips appeared as a guest on BBC One's The One Show and BBC News to promote the project.

Phillips created, produced, and appeared in the documentary No Roses on a Sailor's Grave, which was subsequently acquired by CBC and broadcast on Hollywood Suite in Canada in 2021, and on PBS America in the United Kingdom in 2022.

In 2022 Phillips's debut book, The Search, was published globally in hardback and paperback by Hachette/Little, Brown. The same year Phillips began co-hosting series 4 of The Great British Dig on Channel 4, alongside comedian Hugh Dennis.

In 2023 The Great British Dig was broadcast, and won 'Best Popular Factual Programme' at that year's Broadcast Digital Awards. In October 2023, Phillips's career was highlighted in British Archaeology magazine.

In 2024 Phillips created, scored and appeared in the short-film, Searching For Romani Heritage, for Historic England.

In 2025 Phillips appeared in series 12 of BBC Two's Digging for Britain, alongside Alice Roberts, and co-authored an article on Romani archaeology for British Archaeology magazine. In August, the documentary The Close, produced and presented by Phillips, was released, before screening at Volksbühne, Berlin, in October.

His collaboration with Delaine Le Bas, the art installation By Appointment Only, opened at London Museum in November 2025.

== Romani archaeology and human rights ==
Phillips is from a Romany background. While writing The Search, Phillips founded Romani Community Archaeology alongside Dr Stuart Eve, a non-profit created to undertake archaeological excavations of historic Romany Gypsy sites in the United Kingdom, to highlight human rights abuses of Romani people. In autumn 2024 Romani Community Archaeology excavated a former 'Gypsy Rehabilitation Centre' – a site of forced assimilation created by the Forestry Commission in the New Forest in the 1960s. An exhibition on the excavation, titled The Close, was opened by Phillips at the New Forest Heritage Centre in February 2025, before reopening at the National Holocaust Centre and Museum and the University of Southampton. The exhibition won the Tangible Heritage Award at the 2025 Association of Heritage Interpretation Awards.

Phillips regularly lectures on the topic of both Romani archaeology and Romani rights, most notably at Pembroke College, University of Oxford, House of Lords, Glastonbury Festival, Historic England, University of Liverpool, HMP Erlestoke, Council for British Archaeology, National Trust, and Oxford Brookes.

== Awards and honours ==
In 2017, Phillips's search for the wreck of LCH 185 won the Nautical Archaeology Society's Adopt A Wreck award.

Phillips was elected a Fellow of the Society of Antiquaries of London in 2024.

In 2025, his Romany archaeology work won both the Intangible Heritage Award at the Engaging People Awards, and won a Council of British Archaeology Archaeological Achievement Award at Queen's University Belfast.

In 2026 the work was nominated for a Museum and Heritage Award.
