= Canned Carrott =

- Genre: Comedy
- Written by: Paul Alexander; Jasper Carrott; Hugh Dennis; Steven Knight; Steve Punt; Mike Whitehill
- Directed by: Ed Bye
- Starring: Jasper Carrott
- Theme music composer: Peter Griffiths; Keith Strachan; Matthew Strachan
- Country of origin: United Kingdom
- Original language: English
- No. of series: 2
- No. of episodes: 12 (+ 6 specials)

Production
- Executive producer: Paul Smith
- Producer: Ed Bye
- Running time: 30 minutes
- Production company: Celador Productions

Original release
- Network: BBC1
- Release: 3 October 1990 – 2 January 1992

Canned Carrott is a stand-up and sketch comedy show by Jasper Carrott. It gave rise to spin-off series The Detectives, and made the names of regular contributors Steve Punt and Hugh Dennis.

Two of the regular sketches were "Wiggy" and "The Detectives". "Wiggy" followed the adventures of a man with an unconvincing wig (played by Carrott). It was a slapstick comedy in which the characters were silent except for the narrator, similar in style to Mr. Bean or The Benny Hill Show.

The most popular sketch segment was "The Detectives", featuring two mediocre police officers, Briggs and Louis (played by Carrott and Robert Powell), who tried unsuccessfully to emulate the actions of television detectives. Such was the popularity of this sketch that it became the basis of another television comedy series, The Detectives.

Steve Punt and Hugh Dennis subsequently joined the cast of The Mary Whitehouse Experience, and later got their own sketch show, called The Imaginatively Titled Punt & Dennis Show, which ran for two series.

== Cast ==
- Jasper Carrott – Himself/Various Characters (including Bob Louis in "The Detectives" and Wiggy)
- Hugh Dennis – Various Characters
- Nosher Powell
- Robert Powell – Dave Briggs (segment "The Detectives")
- Steve Punt – Various Characters
- Enn Reitel – Narrator (segment "Wiggy") (voice)
- George Sewell – Supt Cottam (segment "The Detectives")

== Transmissions ==
- Series 1: 6 episodes, 3 October 1990 to 7 November 1990
- Specially Selected Canned Carrott: 3 and 10 September 1991
- Series 2: 6 episodes, 21 November 1991 to 2 January 1992
- More Specially Selected Canned Carrott: 15 September 1992
- The Juicy Bits: 24 May 1994
- More Juicy Bits: 1 July 1995
- Extra Juicy Bits: 26 August 1995

== DVD release ==
In 2011, Canned Carrott received a DVD release comprising all the episodes from the first series. The DVD was titled as ‘Canned Carrott Volume 1’ and inside the DVD Case on the inlay was a promotion stating that Canned Carrott Volume 2 was coming soon, although it was never released.
