= Me, You and Him =

British television sitcom series

- Created by: Hugh Dennis; Nick Hancock; Steve Punt
- Directed by: John Stroud
- Starring: Adie Allen; Hugh Dennis; Nick Hancock; Steve Punt
- Theme music composer: Laurence Frewer; Nick King
- Country of origin: United Kingdom
- Original language: English
- No. of series: 1
- No. of episodes: 6

Production
- Producer: John Stroud
- Running time: 30 minutes (including adverts)
- Production company: Thames Television

Original release
- Network: ITV
- Release: 30 July – 3 September 1992

Me, You and Him is a British television sitcom, that aired on ITV from 30 July to 3 September 1992. It was made for the ITV network by Thames.

It was written by and starred Hugh Dennis, Nick Hancock and Steve Punt, all previously known - though particularly, Punt and Dennis - for their work on the alternative comedy and satirical circuit, especially through the BBC Radio 1 sketch show The Mary Whitehouse Experience, which had transferred to television and made Dennis and Punt into household names.

The plot centred on Hancock's character, John Hanley, a teacher of physical education who lived happily and lazily alone in a flat in the fictional area of Southbridge, London, until his old school friend, ambitious and obnoxious businessman Harry Dunstan (played by Dennis), returns from working in France and moves in with him. Punt's character, the unemployed but intelligent Mark Prior, lives nearby but was forever visiting the others after arguing with his parents.

The six-part series was continuous in its plot, with Harry trying to win back the affections of girlfriend Clare (played by Adie Allen) with whom he had declined to keep in touch while in France. The other regular characters were Hanley's upstairs neighbours Helen and Todd (played by Harriet Thorpe and Ron Donachie), a reformed but still scary ex-convict and his wife, who was his probation officer. A running theme is Harry's discomfort with Todd living above due to his prejudice against criminals, even reformed ones.

Ultimately, the series ended with Harry and Clare reuniting cautiously and Mark deciding to break from his parents' apron strings. The show was deemed a success for ITV and was largely enjoyed by critics but did not appear for a second series.

It gave pre-watershed audiences their first glimpses of Dennis, Hancock and Punt (beyond their numerous appearances on television advertisements) and also featured a guest appearance by Danny Baker, an old friend of Hancock's, parodying his own Daz detergent commercials.

When first promoted by Thames TV in a season preview the title of the show was Letting Go, but this was changed before transmission.
