= Nick Hancock =

British actor and television presenter (born 1962)

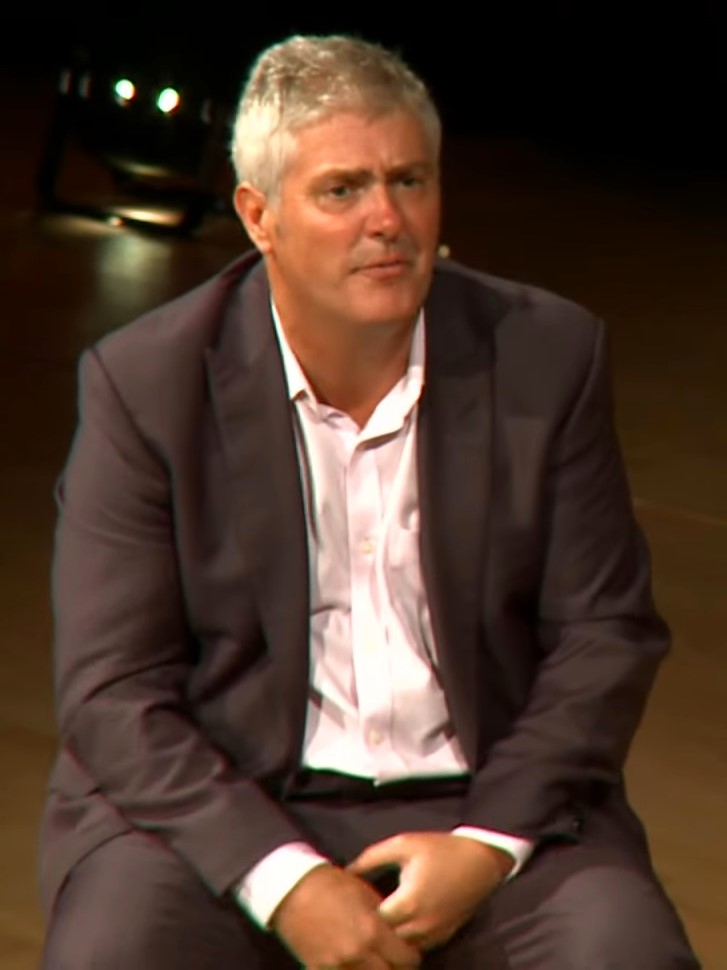
- Hancock in 2013
- Born: Nicholas John Hancock; 25 October 1962 (age 63); Stoke-on-Trent, England
- Education: Homerton College, Cambridge (BA)
- Occupations: Actor, television presenter
- Years active: 1983–present
- Known for: Room 101; They Think It's All Over
- Spouse: Shari Eftekhari (m. 1997)
- Children: 2

Nicholas John Hancock (born 25 October 1962) is an English actor and television presenter. He hosted the sports quiz They Think It's All Over for ten years. He also formerly presented Room 101 (1994–1999) on television, as well as its earlier radio version (1992–1994).

== Early life ==
Hancock grew up with three elder sisters and his father, Ken. He was educated at Yarlet School, Staffordshire, and later Shrewsbury School. He was awarded a third-class degree in education by Homerton College, Cambridge. While he was at Cambridge, Hancock was a member of the Footlights, where he first collaborated with Hugh Dennis and Steve Punt, and became president in 1983, with Punt as vice-president. He was also a founding member of the Homerton College Blaggards.

After graduating, Hancock became a PE teacher and practised stand-up comedy as a hobby. He formed a double act with Neil Mullarkey, another former member of the Footlights, and they mostly did satirical spoofs of the title sequences of television shows to accompanying music, several times on television, including on After Ten with Tarbuck in 1988. The shows include Doctor Who, Kojak and Dad's Army.

== Career ==
His early television credits also include working with Jasper Carrott in Carrott Confidential (1989), and The Mary Whitehouse Experience (1989–1992), and Me, You and Him. In 1990, Hancock presented a comedy/chat show about trivia for British Satellite Broadcasting called La Triviatta (1990). Also in 1990, he appeared in two episodes of Mr. Bean, first as a thief who stole Mr. Bean's camera, and later as a ticket inspector on a train.

In 1992, Hancock was chosen as the presenter of Room 101, remaining in the role until 1999.

In 1995, he became the presenter of They Think It's All Over. An example of the show's humour is when Chris Eubank was slating New Zealand rugby player Jonah Lomu, who was 6 ft 5 in (1.96 m) and about 18 1/2 st (259 lb; 117 kg). Hancock, knowing Lomu was backstage as a mystery guest and about to come on, went along with it.

In 1998, Hancock starred (alongside Andy Smart) in a documentary–comedy about the Iranian national football team, The Outsiders. Also in 1998, he provided the narration for a six-part BBC documentary, Pleasure Beach, following the running of the Blackpool amusement park. In 1999, he also appeared in Great Railway Journeys of the World, travelling from Guantanamo to Pinar del Rio.

In 2006, Hancock discussed his TV likes and dislikes on TV Heaven, Telly Hell. In 2007, he filmed a series for STV and Discovery Real Time called Nick Hancock's Fishing School, in which he teaches a number of students the art of fly fishing.

In 2011, he appeared in a celebrity special edition of the ITV1 gameshow The Chase. Also in 2011, he was asked by BBC America to join the panel of the NPR quiz show Wait Wait... Don't Tell Me! for a year-end special, "A Royal Pain in the News". Hancock won the game.

In June 2015, Hancock guest-hosted the breakfast show for Stoke-on-Trent radio station, Signal 1.

In October 2021, he competed on Scott Mills and Chris Stark's "Upside Down Quiz" on their Weekend Show for BBC Radio 5. Hancock's podcast, "The Famous Sloping Pitch", is hosted on Apple.

In December 2022, from Hancock's barn conversion home and contents, featured in Celebrity Yorkshire Auction House, he submitted 15 quirky items to auction, including a club fender that made £400 and a retro lava lamp, which went for £30. In total, 14 items sold, raising £1,123; the unsold item, a cherished oil painting, returned home with him.

In April 2023, he appeared as a fictionalised version of himself in an episode of series 4 of Meet the Richardsons, having been tracked down by Jon Richardson to discuss life after showbusiness.

== Personal life ==
Hancock met his wife, Iranian-born Shari Eftekhari, during a George Best and Rodney Marsh football roadshow in Staines, Surrey. Hancock proposed to Shari in a pub: "We were playing pool in the Nellie Dean. I said to Shari: 'Have I got something stuck between my teeth?' As she looked I stuck out my tongue – there was an engagement ring on it. She said: 'That's lovely, yes, I will – but can we change the ring?" The couple married in Staffordshire in 1997, two years after they first met, and have two children.

Hancock is a supporter of Stoke City. In September 2001, he paid £20,000 at Sotheby's Football Memorabilia auction in London for the FA Cup winner's medal awarded to Stanley Matthews in 1953. Hancock sold the medal in November 2014 for £220,000. In 2007, he made an appearance on an edition of Antiques Roadshow recorded in Stoke-on-Trent, talking about some of the items in his collection of football memorabilia. He is also a cricket fan. He was interviewed by 6 Towns Radio about the 40th anniversary of Stoke's 1972 League Cup win.

He lives with his wife and their two children in Shrewsbury as of 2018.

== Television credits ==
- Damned
- Bostock's Cup
- Breakaway
- Duel
- Fantasy Football League
- Great Railway Journeys – Cuba
- Hancock's Half Time
- Holding the Baby
- MAC
- Me, You and Him
- Midsomer Murders 'Till death do us part'
- Mr. Bean
- Nick Hancock's Fishing School
- Nights
- Paul Merton: The Series
- Pleasure Beach (Narrator)
- Punt and Dennis
- Room 101
- Swot or Wot
- The Danny Baker Show
- The Mary Whitehouse Experience
- The Pall Bearer's Revue starring Jerry Sadowitz
- They Think It's All Over
- TV Heaven, Telly Hell
- Wait Wait... Don't Tell Me!
- Who's Doing the Dishes?
- Win, Lose or Draw
- Win My Wage

Hancock recorded an hour-long compilation video release of footballing bloopers, dubbed Football Nightmares. This was released on VHS; it was succeeded by two follow-up videos: Football Hell and Football Doctor. These three were later released on a one-disc DVD.

== Radio credits ==
- Room 101
- Fish on Five
- Fighting Talk
- Back End of Next Week
- Wait Wait... Don't Tell Me!
