= Chloë Duckworth =

British archaeologist and television presenter

Chloë N Duckworth FSA FHEA MCIfA
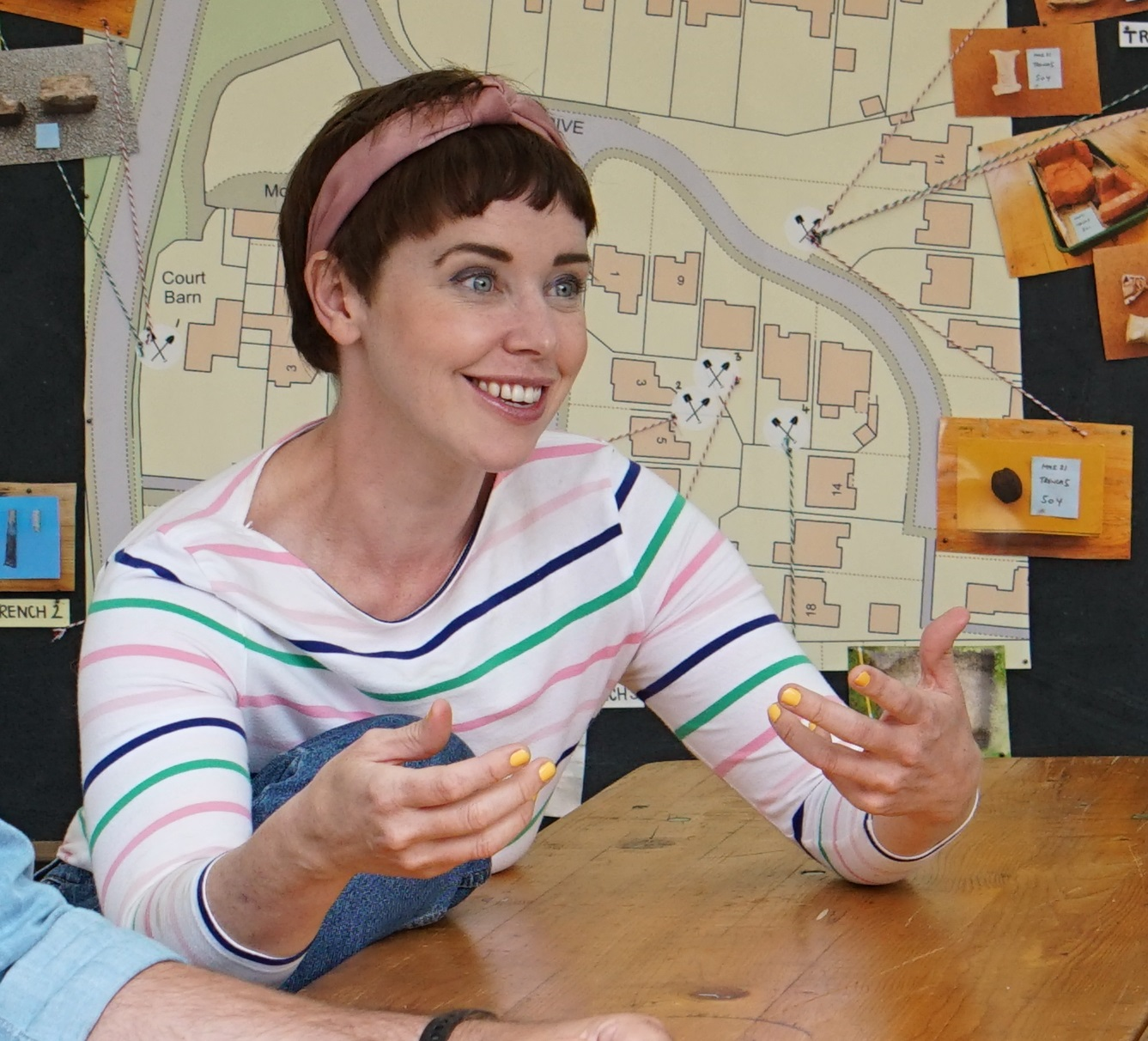
- Duckworth on set of The Great British Dig
- Occupations: Lecturer, Television presenter
- Known for: Presenting The Great British Dig

Academic background
- Education: University of Nottingham
- Thesis: The Created Stone (2011)
- Doctoral advisor: Julian Henderson

Academic work
- Discipline: Archaeology
- Sub-discipline: Archaeological science
- Institutions: Newcastle University, University of Leicester, University of Nottingham

Chloë N. Duckworth FSA FHEA MCIfA is a British archaeological scientist and reader in the School of History, Classics and Archaeology, Newcastle University, and a presenter of The Great British Dig.

== Education ==
After receiving her BA (Hons) in Archaeology, Duckworth was awarded funding from the Arts and Humanities Research Council to study for an MSc and subsequently a PhD at the University of Nottingham. Her PhD, awarded in 2011, was supervised by Julian Henderson and was titled The created stone: chemical and archaeological perspectives on the colour and material properties of early Egyptian glass, 1500–1200 B.C..

== Career and research ==
Duckworth joined Newcastle University in 2016, following her position at the University of Leicester as a postdoctoral researcher on European Research Council funded Trans-Sahara project. She held a British Academy Postdoctoral Fellowship in 2015. She is the director of two field projects at UNESCO World Heritage Sites in Spain: the Madinat al-Zahra Survey Project and The Alhambra Royal Workshops project. Her research group at Newcastle University aims to reconstruct the technology of glass in the past by using experimental reconstructions, texts, and scientific analysis. She is a member of the editorial board of World Archaeology journal, and an external examiner for the University of Oxford. She was elected as a fellow of the Society of Antiquaries of London on 5 May 2017. She is also a Fellow of the Higher Education Academy and a Member of the Chartered Institute for Archaeologists. Until September 2021, she co-directed the Newcastle University Centre for Heritage. As of 2023 she holds the position of reader in archaeological science and public engagement in the School of History, Classics and Archaeology at the University of Newcastle.

Recycling and Re-Use in the Roman Economy, which Duckworth co-edited with Andrew Wilson in 2020, was both praised as a summary of the present research on the topic and as 'a starting point for further research'. It was also noted as likely to 'catalyze studies of recycling and reuse in and beyond the Roman world for years to come.' by Linda R. Gosner in the American Journal of Archaeology.

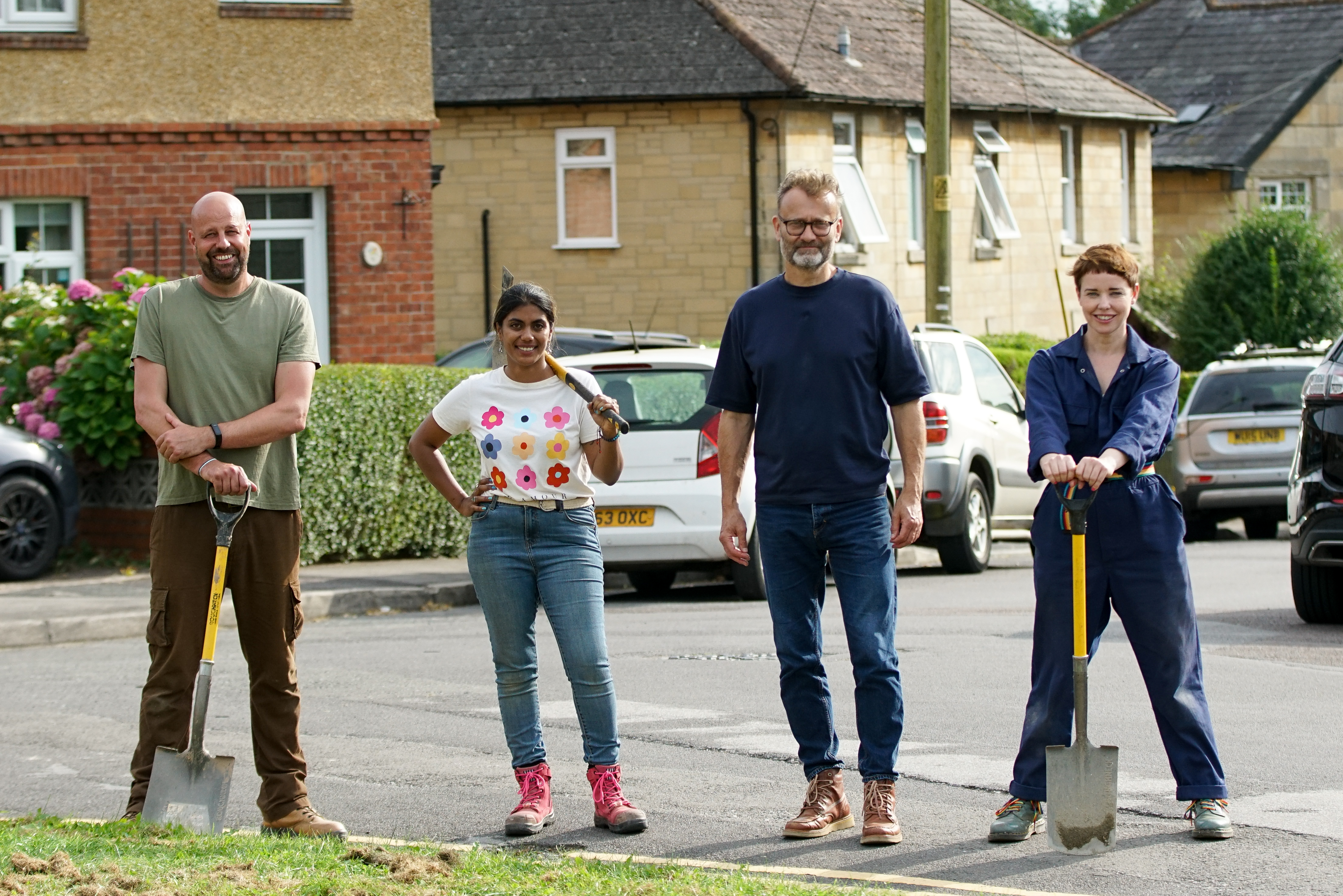
Duckworth (right) on set at The Great British Dig, 2021

As well as her academic career, Duckworth is a television presenter and public speaker. In 2017 she was part of the BBC Expert Women and in 2019 was a presenter at the New Scientist Live Show. Since 2020 she has presented Channel 4's The Great British Dig with Hugh Dennis. She authored a book of the same title in 2022 to accompany the series.

She was shortlisted for the Council for British Archaeology's "Outstanding Archaeological Achievement" award in 2021.

== Personal life and advocacy ==
In 2021, Duckworth launched the "Dig for Archaeology" campaign, which seeks to promote the positive aspects of commercial, academic and community archaeology in the UK, and to raise awareness of the threats it faces. She advocates increasing diversity and representation in archaeology, and is a committee member of the Chartered Institute for Archaeologists's Equality and Diversity Group.

She lives in Northumberland.

== Selected publications ==
- Molloy, Barry; Duckworth, Chloë N., eds. (2014). A Cretan Landscape through Time: Priniatikos Pyrgos and Environs. BAR International Studies. ISBN 9781407312712.
- Duckworth, Chloë N.; Wilson, Andrew, eds. (2020). Recycling and Reuse in the Roman Economy. Oxford: Oxford University Press. ISBN 9780198860846.
- Duckworth, C. N.; Cuenod, A.; Mattingly, D. J., eds. (2020). Mobile Technologies in the Ancient Sahara and Beyond. Cambridge: Cambridge University Press. ISBN 9781108830546.
- García Porras, Alberto; Duckworth, Chloë N.; Govantes-Edwards, David J., eds. (2022). The Royal Workshops of the Alhambra: industrial activity in early modern Granada. Woodbridge: Boydell & Brewer. ISBN 9781783276813.
- Duckworth, Chloë (2022). The Great British Dig: History in Your Back Garden. London: Conway Publishing. ISBN 9781844866267.
