= Hurting =

Hurting may refer to:

- Pain
- The Hurting, 1983 debut album by Tears for Fears
- The Hurting (TV series), a British television clip show
- "Hurting" (song), 2010 single by Karl Wolf, featuring Sway
