= John Dennis (bishop) =

English bishop (1931–2020)

The Right Reverend John Dennis
- Bishop of St Edmundsbury and Ipswich
- Church: Church of England
- Diocese: Diocese of St Edmundsbury and Ipswich
- In office: 1986–1996
- Predecessor: John Waine
- Successor: Richard Lewis
- Other posts: Honorary assistant bishop in Winchester (1996–2020); Bishop of Knaresborough; 1979–1986

Orders
- Ordination: 1956 (deacon); 1957 (priest)
- Consecration: 1979

Personal details
- Born: 19 June 1931
- Died: 13 April 2020 (aged 88)
- Denomination: Anglican
- Children: John Dennis; Hugh Dennis
- Education: St Catharine's College, Cambridge

John Dennis (19 June 1931 – 13 April 2020) was an Anglican bishop, who served as Bishop of Knaresborough, and then for ten years as Bishop of St Edmundsbury and Ipswich. In retirement, he was an honorary assistant bishop in the Diocese of Winchester.

== Education ==
Dennis was born to (Hubert) Ronald Dennis (1899–1990) and Evelyn, daughter of Leonard Joseph Neville-Polley, a science tutor and author who wrote a biography of the chemist and physicist John Dalton. His father, Ronald Dennis, was the son of a South Yorkshire coal hewer and served as a platoon commander on the Western Front in World War I.

Dennis was evacuated during the war, residing with his paternal grandparents in the mining village of Wales, near Kiveton.

After the war, he was educated at Rutlish School, Merton (a state grammar school, where his father taught biology and physics), and St Catharine's College, Cambridge (BA 1954, MA 1959), before studying for ordination at Cuddesdon College, Oxford. At Cambridge, he rowed, which he said "[it was] my passion. I loved it, and I managed to prove myself quite tolerably good."

Between school and university he spent a year of National Service serving with the Royal Air Force.

== Ministry ==
Following curacies in Armley and Kettering, he was appointed vicar of the Isle of Dogs in 1962, transferring to John Keble Church, Mill Hill, in 1971. He was appointed as a prebendary of St Paul's Cathedral, London, in 1977.

He became the Bishop of Knaresborough in 1979, which was a suffragan see to the diocesan Bishop of Ripon; and for most of his time in that office he also served as Diocesan Director of Ordinands (DDO) for the Diocese of Ripon. In 1986, he was translated to become the diocesan Bishop of St Edmundsbury and Ipswich in Suffolk. He retired in 1996 and lived in Winchester from 1999.

Dennis served as a Lords Spiritual in the House of Lords from 1992 till his retirement in 1996.

== Knaresborough report ==
In 1969, the Ely Commission of the Church of England considered the initiation of children within the Church, and in 1971 published its report "Christian Initiation: Birth and Growth in the Christian Society" (Church Information Office, 1971). This led to widespread debate about whether children should start receiving Holy Communion after their Confirmation, as had always been traditional for Anglicans, or whether they should be admitted to Holy Communion at a much younger age. In 1976, the General Synod voted to retain the status quo, but debate continued in the dioceses. A working party was established to look at the question in greater depth, and Dennis was selected as the chairman of the working party. This resulted in the publication of "Children and Communion" (CIO 1983) and "Communion before Confirmation?" (Ed.D. Isaac) (CIO 1985), both commonly referenced as "The Knaresborough Report", after Dennis's episcopal see.

== Personal life ==
In 1956, Dennis married Dorothy Mary, daughter of Godfrey Parker Hinnels (who fought at the first Battle of Arras in World War I). They had two sons; the elder is John Dennis, a diplomat who was British Ambassador to Angola from 2014 to 2018, while the younger son is the actor and comedian Hugh Dennis.

Dennis was a Freemason and a member of Rutlish Lodge No. 4416 (the Masonic Lodge associated with his school) under the United Grand Lodge of England. He was initiated on 18 April 1975, at the lodge's regular meeting place in the Tower Room at Great Tower Street, beside the Tower of London. He was initiated by his father, who was a past master of the lodge. He was raised to the third degree in Sutton, Surrey, two years later, as the lodge had by then permanently relocated.

Dennis died on 13 April 2020 aged 88 from COVID-19, six weeks after his wife.
