= Sweetapple =

- Founded: 2002; 24 years ago
- Founders: Elaine Sweetapple; Matthew Sweetapple
- Headquarters: London, England, United Kingdom
- Website: sweetapple.co.uk

Sweetapple is an English creative consultancy and production company founded by Elaine and Matthew Sweetapple in 2002. Based in London, the company has developed campaigns and projects for charities in the United Kingdom and internationally.

Sweetapple's work includes Peeball for the Prostate Cancer Charity (UK), CANSA (South Africa) and the Australian Prostate Cancer Foundation, 'Remember Me' for the road crash victim's charity, RoadPeace (UK), and the ecological musical story, Rockford's Rock Opera, written with Steve Punt which has collaborated with organisations such as WWF, Buglife, Missing Persons, Battersea Dogs and Cats Home. Sweetapple has also been involved in the charitable insurance initiative GiveSure.

The company continues to operate as a marketing, production and PR consultancy. Its charitable work has received recognition from UK industry bodies, including the Institute of Public Relations "Outstanding Achievement Award" and PRWeek "Best Not for Profit" awards.

== Peeball ==
Peeball was developed as an alternative way of raising charitable funds and public awareness, designed to use humour to draw attention to health issues that were often overlooked in everyday conversation or mainstream media. The project aimed to combine entertainment and sport with information about prostate cancer and related health concerns. The product was sold through a range of UK retail outlets including Mitchells & Butlers and Scottish & Newcastle pub chains, Virgin Megastores, River Island and Ryman, as well as online. In the UK, Peeballs were priced at £1, with 30p from each sale donated to the Prostate Cancer Charity.

Peeball was featured on national television, including This Morning, and on radio programmes such as Radio One's Mark and Lard and on Radio Two's Steve Wright Show. It was also featured by newspapers, magazines and local media. The accompanying online game has recorded more than 26 million plays. Following the project’s visibility in the United Kingdom, versions of Peeball have been taken up by other prostate cancer charities.

More than 500,000 Peeballs were sold in the UK, raising over £150,000 for the Prostate Cancer Charity.

In 2015, the product was introduced in Australia by the Chemist Warehouse store group in partnership with the AFL Coaches Association.

== Remember Me ==
The Remember Me image projected on City Hall, London

The 'Remember Me' campaign for RoadPeace – a UK road accident victims charity was launched on 31 August 2003. Sweetapple created the 'Remember Me' Weeping Flower sign and provided it to the charity as a memorial for people who had died or been injured in road collisions. The sign was also used as a visual reminder of the risks associated with everyday road use.

More than 3,000 Remember Me signs have been placed on roads in the United Kingdom. The Weeping Flower image has been used in a number of RoadPeace initiatives, including projections on City Hall in London and campaigns by Transport for London that addressed the link between road deaths and Safety Cameras.

== Rockford's Rock Opera ==
Rockford's Rock Opera is a collection of four ecological musical stories – Lost on Infinity, The King of Nowhere, The Spooo who Grew and The End of Infinity – created by Elaine and Matthew Sweetapple Steve Punt.

Rockford's Rock Opera's audio visual resources and audiobook are used in teaching about extinction, ecology and biodiversity. They have been referenced by education portals including BGCI, Woodlands Junior School and Teachernet, and have been noted in The Times, The Guardian and Primary Times. The creators have also discussed the project on BBC Radio.

The musical introduces the Island of Infinity, home to the last single representative of every extinct animal and plant species. Key characters include the fictional Cocklebur Ick, the Registrar, Dectopus and The Herculous. Also featured are non-fictional species such as the passenger pigeon, great auk, moa and thylacine.

Rockford's Rock Opera has been described as an "Adventure in Sound ", with influences noted from The Hitchhiker's Guide to the Galaxy, Jeff Wayne's War of the Worlds, Butterfly Ball and The Point!. It has been described by The Guardian as an "ingenious... thoroughly modern musical". and, by The Times, as a "cult favourite as beloved as Wallace and Gromit." Online and mobile formats provide access to audio visual materials and different versions of the story. On the Apple iPhone and Android devices, Rockford's Rock Opera (Part One) is available as a free app.

Rockford's Rock Opera's ecological messages and content have led to cooperative links with environmental organizations and charities including the WWF, Buglife and the BGCI.

Following many school performances, it has been performed live on stage at various venues including the Museum of London and The Bull Theatre in London.

Rockford's Rock Opera grew from the success of a song released by Sweetapple with the help of Gerry Bron on behalf of Battersea Dogs and Cats Home called "Rockford's Christmas" which entered the UK singles chart in 2004.

A fully illustrated book edition of Lost on Infinity, including access to the accompanying audiobook, was released in 2025.
