= The Great British Dig =

Channel4 reality television series

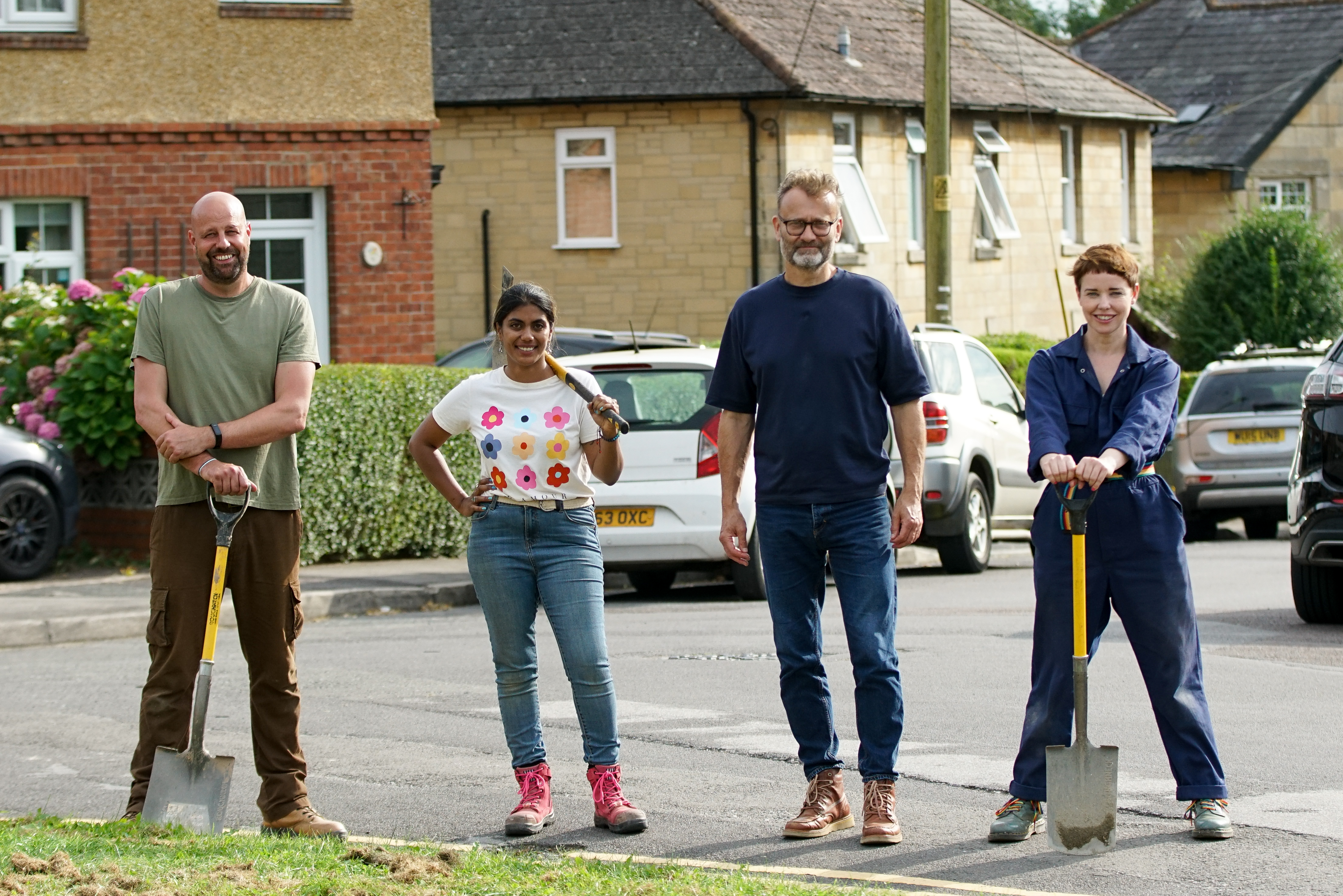
- Promotional photograph for Series 1 of The Great British Dig
- Also known as: The Great British Dig: History in Your Back Garden
- Genre: Factual TV Series
- Created by: Strawberry Blond TV
- Presented by: Hugh Dennis
- Starring: Richard Taylor; Natasha Billson; Chloë Duckworth; John-Henry Phillips
- Country of origin: United Kingdom
- Original language: English
- No. of seasons: 4
- No. of episodes: 20

Production
- Executive producer: Steve Wynne
- Running time: 45 minutes

Original release
- Network: Channel 4 More4
- Release: 9 April 2020 – 20 July 2023

The Great British Dig: History in Your Back Garden is a factual television programme about community archaeology, that airs on More4 and Channel 4, produced by Strawberry Blond TV. Presented by comedian and actor Hugh Dennis along with three archaeological experts, each episode sees the team arrive in a local community somewhere in Britain, and knock on people's doors to ask if they can dig in their gardens and shared spaces.

The pilot aired on More 4 in April 2020, and was followed by a 4-episode series starting on 17 February 2021 on More 4, repeated on Channel 4 on Sunday evenings from 24 October 2021. The five-episode second series aired from 29 December 2021. Series three aired in 2022, and a fourth series aired in 2023.

== Format ==
Each week the team arrives in a different local community, and sets about unlocking clues to mysteries about the past by digging in the gardens and community spaces of local residents. The show typically opens with Hugh meeting the experts, who explain what they're looking for that week, and who then drag him off to rally local support in the hope of drumming up some volunteers. In addition to the on-screen archaeologists, there are a number of professionals involved in excavating the trenches and helping the residents to learn more about uncovering the past, and various specialists who help to further illuminate the questions at hand.

== Cast ==
In addition to Hugh Dennis, the show is presented by university lecturer Chloë Duckworth and commercial archaeologist Natasha ('Tash') Billson. Community archaeologist and geophysicist Richard Taylor presented the show from the pilot through to the end of series three. Romani archaeologist and author John-Henry Phillips joined as co-presenter for Series 4. The presenters are joined each week by a varied host of other on-screen specialists, including digital visualisation expert Marcus Abbott, environmental archaeologist Don O'Meara, and finds specialists Hannah Russ and David Griffiths. Regular guest presenters have included military historian Andrew Robertshaw, historian and genealogist Michala Hulme, facial reconstruction expert Caroline Wilkinson, castles expert Rachel Swallow, and architectural historian Jonathan Foyle.

Also featured on-screen are members of the local communities involved in the digs, and a wider cast of professional archaeologists.

== Reception ==
The show's pilot was More 4's most successful one-off show in 2020 and the first series received widespread positive reviews. It has been described by critics as a "lovely reminder of the history beneath your feet". The community involvement and accessibility of the show has been praised by reviewers, with a Daily Mail write-up commenting, “it’s enough to make you wonder what might be lurking under your own garden…”

In 2021, it was shortlisted for Best Popular Factual Programme in the Broadcast Digital Awards.

In 2024, Series 4 won 'Best Popular Factual Programme' in the Broadcast Digital Awards.

== Episodes ==
=== Pilot (2020) ===
No. overall	Featured location	Original release date
1	Maidstone, Kent	9 April 2020

=== Series 1 (2021) ===
No. overall	No. in season	Featured location	Original release date
2	1	Benwell, Newcastle	17 February 2021
3	2	Masham, North Yorkshire	24 February 2021
4	3	Lenton, Nottingham	3 March 2021
5	4	South Shields	10 March 2021

=== Series 2 (2021–22) ===
No. overall	No. in season	Featured location	Original release date
6	1	Falkirk	29 December 2021
7	2	Stretton, Staffordshire	5 January 2022
8	3	Devizes	12 January 2022
9	4	Beningbrough	19 January 2022
10	5	West Derby, Liverpool	26 January 2022

=== Series 3 (2022) ===
No. overall	No. in season	Featured location	Original release date
11	1	Odiham, Hampshire	11 April 2022
12	2	Oldham, Greater Manchester	18 April 2022
13	3	King's Lynn, Norfolk	25 April 2022
14	4	Oswestry, Shropshire	2 May 2022
15	5	Coventry	9 May 2022

=== Series 4 (2023) ===
No. overall	No. in season	Featured location	Original release date
16	1	Cornwall	15 June 2023
17	2	North Yorkshire	22 June 2023
18	3	Newcastle	29 June 2023
19	4	Nottinghamshire	6 July 2023
20	5	Bognor Regis	13 July 2023

=== Special (2023) ===
No. overall	Featured location	Original release date
21	Best of The Great British Dig	20 July 2023

== Archaeological accuracy ==
The archaeological research, on-site health and safety, permit applications, post-excavation and reporting for Series 1, 2 and 3 was handled by heritage consultancy Solstice Heritage, alongside various local experts in archaeological excavation and survey. Finds processing was conducted by post-excavation management company Archaeobiz, with selected finds being directed to specialists across the UK. York Archaeology (formerly York Archaeology Trust) has provided experienced field archaeologists from series 1 to series 4, and is also responsible for processing and reporting upon the finds uncovered during the making of series 4.

== Awards and nominations ==
Year	Award	Category	Result
2022	Broadcast Digital Awards	Best Popular Factual Programme	Shortlisted
2023	Broadcast Digital Awards	Best Popular Factual Programme	Winner
