= John Dennis (diplomat) =

British diplomat (born 1959)

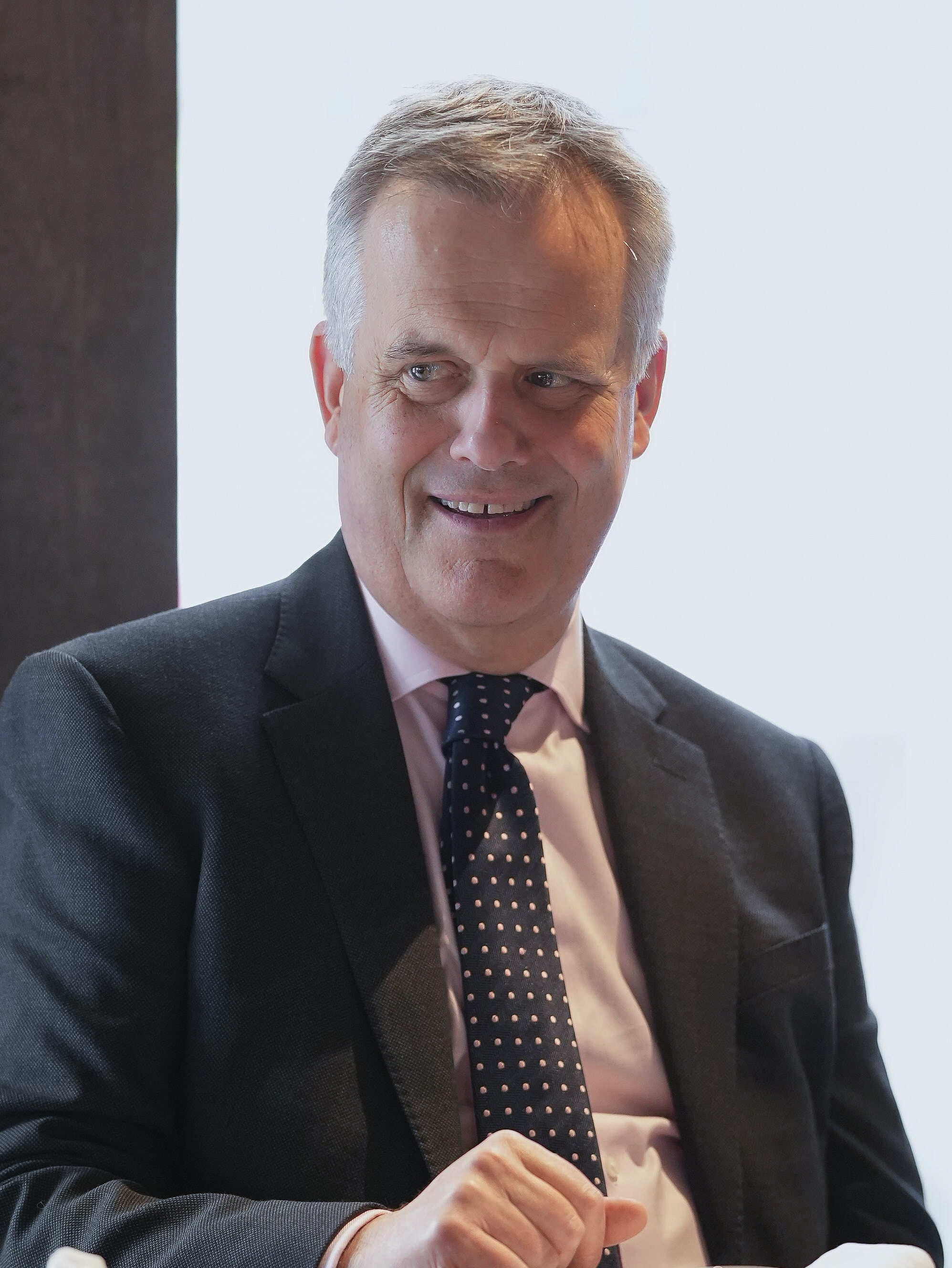
- Dennis in 2025

Representative, British Office Taipei
- In office December 2020 – February 2025
- Monarchs: Elizabeth II; Charles III
- Prime Minister: Boris Johnson; Liz Truss; Rishi Sunak; Keir Starmer
- Preceded by: Andrew Pittam (acting)
- Succeeded by: Ruth Bradley-Jones

British Ambassador to Angola
- In office February 2014 – March 2018
- Monarch: Elizabeth II
- Prime Minister: David Cameron; Theresa May
- Preceded by: Richard Wildash
- Succeeded by: Jessica Hand

Personal details
- Born: John David Dennis Jr. 6 August 1959 (age 67)
- Spouse: Jillian Margaret Dennis
- Children: 2
- Parent: John Dennis (father)
- Relatives: Hugh Dennis (brother)
- Education: University of Cambridge
- Occupation: Diplomat

John David Dennis Jr. (born 6 August 1959) is a British diplomat who was the British Ambassador to Angola from 2014 to 2018 and the Director of Green Corridors and Ivory Trade at the Foreign and Commonwealth Office for the Illegal Wildlife Trade Conference 2018. He was the British Representative to Taiwan, heading British Office Taipei, from 2020 to 2025.

== Consular career ==
Dennis joined the FCO in 1981 as a Desk Officer for Tanzania and Uganda. In 1982, he started a language course to become proficient at Mandarin and in 1985, was posted to the Embassy of the United Kingdom, Beijing as second secretary.

In 1987 Dennis was recalled to the FCO to be head of the Malaysia, Singapore and Brunei section. He stayed in this post until 1989 when he was re-assigned to be the head of the Recruitment Section. In 1992 Dennis was posted abroad again to Kuala Lumpur to be the head of the Political Section of the High Commission there. In 1996 he took a secondment and became the Special Adviser to the chairman of Standard Chartered Bank for two years.

On his return to full-time civil service work in 1998, he was appointed the Director of Motor Vehicles at the Department of Trade and Industry. Dennis was posted to New Delhi in 2001 to be Director for Trade and Investment and in 2003 he was made Deputy Head of Mission in Beijing. He stayed there for three years, until he was recalled to be an additional Director for Asia in the FCO.

For a short time in 2009 Dennis worked in the Local Staff Strategy Review but was very quickly given the job of the Head of the Zimbabwe Unit at the Africa Directorate at the FCO. In 2010, he was made the Head of the Central and Southern Africa Department.

He stayed in this post until his appointment as UK Ambassador to Angola in February 2014, succeeding Richard Wildash. In his time as Ambassador in Luanda, Dennis oversaw the signing of a Memorandum of Understanding and led "successful ... efforts to deepen cooperation between Angola and the UK". He left the post in February 2018, being replaced by Jessica Hand. After being recalled, Dennis worked on the Illegal Wildlife Trade Conference in October 2018 in London.

Dennis was appointed representative of the British Office Taipei in December 2020 and formally assumed office the following month. In January 2025, he was awarded Taiwan's Friendship Medal of Diplomacy.

== Personal life ==
Dennis is married and has two sons. He can speak Mandarin.

He is the son of bishop John Dennis and older brother of the actor and comedian Hugh Dennis.

Diplomatic posts
Preceded by Richard Wildash	United Kingdom Ambassador to Angola; 2014 – 2018	Succeeded by Jessica Hand
Preceded by Andrew Pittam (acting)	Representative, British Office Taipei; 2020 –	Incumbent
