= Archaeology of the Romani people =

Archaeology of the Romani people refers to the science of archaeology as applied in relation to the Romani people, an ethnic group dispersed across the world, which is known under several different names. The Romani people has a long history, and most likely hails from the Indian subcontinent. Throughout said history, the highly diverse Roma population has faced significant persecution in many parts of the world, and continues to do so today.

== History and status ==
Due to the Romani people's frequent status as outsiders in regards to mainstream society and a constant minority, lacking any form of nation state and in turn facing structural bias and neglect from many national, regional and local governments and authorities, the research done into Romani history and culture has often been either lacking or non-existent. In modern times, even when this issue gradually being resolved in some areas, the field of Romani archaeology remains virtually unexplored. For example, the prominent Hungarian archaeologist Eszter Bánffy (de), director of the Römisch-Germanische Kommission of the German Archaeological Institute, has written that in all of post-Cold War era Eastern Europe, she has not found a single archaeologist of Romani heritage, nor anyone interested in researching let alone excavating possible Romani archaeological sites.

While the French sociologist Jean-Pierre Liégeois (fr), director of the Gypsy Research Centre, has asserted that due to their often highly mobile lifestyle and frequent societal discrimination, the Romani have left behind no such archaeological sites, there have been some limited field surveys and excavations of Romani-related sites.

John-Henry Phillips, a British archaeologist from a Romany background, and co-presenter of Channel 4's The Great British Dig, formed Romani Community Archaeology in 2022, and has undertaken excavations of historic Romany Gypsy sites in the United Kingdom.

=== Scandinavia ===
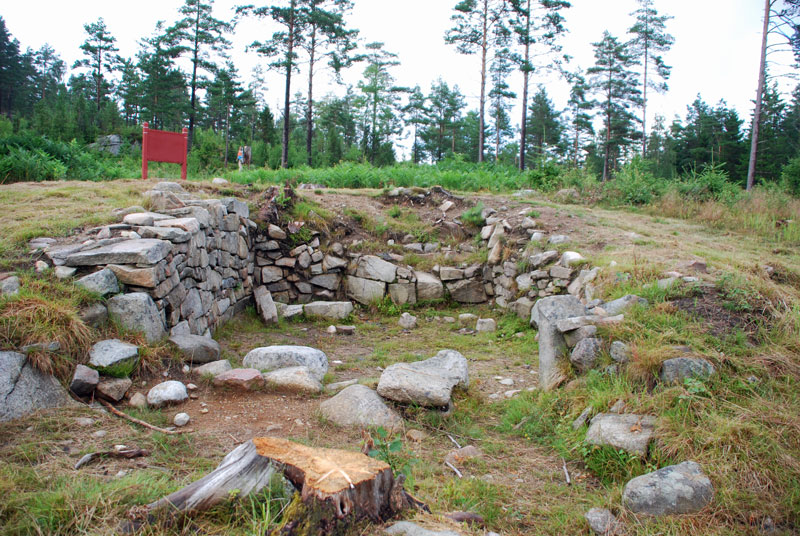
Excavated building foundations in Snarsmon, Sweden, 2009.

This is especially the case in Sweden and Norway, where the Norwegian and Swedish Travellers arrived in the early 16th century. Two sites in particular have gone through several stages of excavation, with a third excavation project beginning in 2015. One is Snarsmon (also pejoratively called Tattarstaden, roughly the Gypsy Town), a Romani village close to the Norwegian border in Tanum Municipality which was active as a sanctuary from the 1860s until the first years of the 20th century. Surveys began in 2003, with yearly excavations between 2004 and 2007. Done in the style of community archaeology, participants – other than professional archaeologists – included both local inhabitants of non-Romani origin, as well as members from several Traveller organizations and one Roma cultural association. One result of this project was the establishment in 2012 of the first Swedish museum exhibition about Traveller history, located in the town of Uddevalla, featuring some of the objects found during the excavations.

The second Swedish site is Krämarstaden (roughly translated, the Huckster Town), likewise a Romani village, located near Finnerödja in Laxå Municipality. The village was established in the first years of the 20th century, and abandoned in the beginning of the 1920s. Core surveys began at the same time as those in Snarsmon, with two phases of archaeological excavation taking place in 2013 and 2014, which much like the previous project involved professional archaeologists and other scientists, local inhabitants, and Swedish Travellers.

In August 2015, excavations began at a Romani campsite outside of Stockholm, in Skarpnäck. The camp was built in 1959 by the Swedish state as a temporary solution, until apartments could be arranged for the Romani, who had just been given full civic rights (and with that, a right to housing). The camp soon became permanent as the administrative process was dragged out, its inhabitants – about thirty people – living in tents, caravans and two home-built cottages, exposed to the weather. The two-year project, titled I stadens utkant (In the City's Fringe), is financed partially by the Swedish National Heritage Board, and is a cooperative project between the Swedish History Museum, the cultural association É Romani Glinda (the Romani Mirror), Mångkulturellt Centrum (Multicultural Center) in Botkyrka, and Stiftelsen Kulturmiljövård (the Cultural Environment Management Foundation). It will result in a book and an excavation report, in addition to certain finds forming part of the "Sweden's History" exhibition at the Swedish History Museum.

Several other archaeological sites belonging to the Romani people and the Scandinavian Travellers exist in Sweden as well as Norway, some of which were surveyed and mapped out in the transnational Scandinavian Traveller Map project. One of these, Tattardalen (Gypsy Valley) in Kungälv Municipality, is a ruined farmstead dating back to the 1600s, and is therefore the oldest Scandinavian site connected to the Travellers.

=== Czech Republic ===
Since 2017 archaeological surveys have taken place at the site of a Roma concentration camp in the Czech Republic. After World War II the site located at Lety u Písku was converted to a pig farm. Recently the farm has been shut down and work is underway to convert the complex into a museum. Archaeological excavations at the site have recovered building materials such as nails and door handles as well as beads and buttons that may have belonged to the prisoners there. Upcoming excavations will seek to locate the camp's burial sites.

=== England ===
John-Henry Phillips, a British archaeologist from a Romany background, and co-presenter of Channel 4's The Great British Dig, formed Romani Community Archaeology in 2022, and has undertaken excavations of historic Romany Gypsy sites in the United Kingdom. The first of these investigated the site of a former 'Gypsy Rehabiliation Centre' at Thorney Hill in the New Forest – a site of forced assimilation – that ran from the 1960s to the 1970s. The excavation was undertaken as a community archaeology project, and was featured on Series 12 of BBC Two's Digging for Britain with Alice Roberts.

=== Elsewhere ===
Another example of possibly Romani-related archaeology is a June 2010 excavation of the "Caird’s Cave" in Rosemarkie, Scotland, a site possibly inhabited by Scottish Gypsy and Traveller groups. In addition to archaeology directly relating to Romani sites, there have also been some research done into the archaeogenetics and "linguistic archaeology" of the Romani people. An example of this is the discovery of a skeleton in an Anglo-Saxon cemetery under Norwich Castle in Norfolk, which – as reported by British Archaeology – was genetically identified as a possible Romani man.

== See also ==
- Contemporary archaeology
- Ethnoarchaeology
- Timeline of Romani history
