= The History of the World Backwards =

- Genre: Comedy mockumentary
- Created by: Rob Newman
- Starring: Rob Newman; Anton Lesser; Richard McCabe; Colin McFarlane; Lucy Liemann; Jim Howick; Su-Lin Looi
- Country of origin: United Kingdom
- Original language: English
- No. of series: 1
- No. of episodes: 6

Production
- Running time: 30 minutes

Original release
- Network: BBC Four
- Release: 30 October – 4 December 2007

The History of the World Backwards is a comedy sketch show written and starring Rob Newman. It is a mock history programme set in an alternative world, where time flows forwards, but history flows backwards. It was shown on BBC Four, starting on 30 October 2007, and later shown on BBC Two. It was Newman's first television project for 14 years.

== Plot ==
The History of the World Backwards tells the story of the world, but in a world where time flows forwards whilst history told backwards. In other words, if you were born in 2007, you would be 60 years old in 1947. All the major historical events happen backwards, so for example, Nelson Mandela enters jail a Spice Girls fan, and comes out as a terrorist intent in overthrowing the state. There are several recurring themes, such as the "Technology collapse", where scientific discoveries are lost, forgotten or made unworkable.

== Reception ==
Most reviews of the show have been critical of it. One reviewer said, "Here, we are relying largely on Newman alone and he ends up being bogged down into too many sketches that fail to go anywhere and stretch far too long", and also said it was too similar to Time Trumpet. Another claimed the show was too confusing and that, "The sketches are nonsensically unfunny, and any serious points get lost in the absurdity." A. A. Gill said that, "It's a sketch show written by Stephen Hawking's wheelchair. It collapses under the weight and restrictions of its own concepts."
