= No Roses on a Sailor's Grave =

- Poster
- Directed by: Daniel Oron
- Written by: John-Henry Phillips
- Produced by: John-Henry Phillips, Daniel Oron
- Starring: John-Henry Phillips, Patrick Thomas
- Cinematography: Daniel Oron, Geoff Bland, Reuben Denty
- Edited by: Nick Montgomery
- Music by: Alex Redfern
- Production company: Go Button Media
- Distributed by: CBC
- Release date: 1 December 2020
- Countries: Canada; France; United Kingdom
- Language: English

No Roses on a Sailor's Grave is a 2020 documentary film directed by Daniel Oron, following author and archaeologist John-Henry Phillips's search for a lost Second World War shipwreck in Normandy.

== Origins ==
Phillips met D-Day veteran Patrick Thomas in Normandy in 2016. Inspired by Thomas's story of being the last survivor of the sinking of LCH 185, one of the first landing craft to reach Sword Beach on D-Day, as well as the recent loss of his grandfather, Phillips promised to find the remains of the ship in the English Channel.

Having worked together at the development stage of various television series, Canadian production company Go Button Media's Daniel Oron offered to follow the expedition as a film director to create a documentary, with Phillips serving as producer.

== Release ==
In 2021, No Roses on a Sailor's Grave was selected for a number of international film festivals, including the Archaeological Institute of America's Arkhaios Cultural Heritage and Archaeology Film Festival in Spokane, NorthwestFest in Edmonton, Canada, Luleå International Film Festival in Sweden, and Indy Film Fest in Indianapolis.

To promote the film, Phillips, alongside veteran Thomas, appeared on BBC One's The One Show, alongside comedian Frank Skinner and the cast of Strictly Come Dancing.

The film was nominated for, and won, several awards, most notably a Director's Guild of Canada award.

In March 2022 No Roses on a Sailor's Grave was acquired by CBC for worldwide distribution. A shortened version of the film had its broadcast debut on Hollywood Suite in Canada in 2021, before airing on PBS America in the United Kingdom in 2022.

== Critical reception ==
No Roses on a Sailor's Grave was recommended by both The Daily Express and The Guardian.
