= Jessica Hand =

British diplomat

Her Excellency Jessica Hand
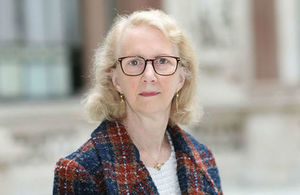

British Ambassador to Angola
- In office March 2018 – December 2021
- Monarch: Elizabeth II
- Prime Minister: Theresa May; Boris Johnson
- Preceded by: John Dennis
- Succeeded by: Roger Stringer

Personal details
- Born: Jessica Mary Pearce; 1957 (age 68–69)
- Spouse: Robert Hand
- Education: University of Aberdeen
- Occupation: Diplomat

Jessica Mary Hand (née Pearce; born 1957) is a British diplomat who was the British Ambassador to Angola from 2018 to 2021. She was appointed as ambassador on 21 July 2017 and succeeded John Dennis in March the next year.

== Early life and education ==
Hand is from South Wales from "a family of teachers, undertakers and butchers". She left school after taking her A-levels and worked as a secretary in Barry for two years before going to study international relations at the University of Aberdeen. After graduating, Hand returned to being a secretary as well as working in Cardiff selling wine.

== Consular career ==
Hand joined the Foreign and Commonwealth Office in 1985, beginning as a Desk Officer for India, Sri Lanka, Bhutan and The Maldives. In 1986, she was moved to be Desk Officer for Hungary and Czechoslovakia. Hand was first posted abroad in 1987 to Senegal.

She was recalled in 1990 to be the Head of Economic Sanctions in the UN Department of the FCO and in 1992, the Head of the South Africa Section of the Africa Department. Between 1994 and 1996, Hand was placed on a language training course, becoming proficient in Russian.

In 1996, Hand was appointed the UK Ambassador to Belarus in Minsk. At age 38, she was the then youngest-ever female British head of mission. She stayed in the post until 1999, when she was recalled to be the Deputy Head of the Non-Proliferation Department at the FCO.

Hand was posted to Holland in 2002, to work at NATO JFC Brunssum as the UK Political Adviser and two years later was assigned to the Moscow consulate as Consul General and Director of Operations. In 2008, she was posted to Istanbul as Consul General and the Director of Trade and Investment, serving under David Reddaway. Hand stayed there until 2012, when she was recalled to work on various assignments at the FCO, including the Arms Trade Treaty.

From 2014 until her appointment in July 2017 as UK Ambassador to Angola, Hand worked as the Head of the Arms Export Policy Department.

Hand succeeded John Dennis in March 2018 as the Ambassador to Angola and the non-resident Ambassador to São Tomé and Príncipe. She presented her credentials to Angolan president João Lourenço on 28 June the same year. During her term she supported Lourenço's anti-corruption measures, increased economic ties, and facilitated an official visit by Prince Harry in 2019. She stayed in the post for four years, announcing she was leaving in November 2021. She was succeeded by Roger Stringer the next month.

== Personal life ==
Pearce married Robert Hand, a retired defence attache of the US Army, and has three step-children. In a 1996 interview with Decca Aitkenhead, Hand said she considers herself Welsh.

Diplomatic posts
Preceded by John Everard	United Kingdom Ambassador to Belarus; 1996–1999	Succeeded by Iain Kelly
Preceded by John Dennis	United Kingdom Ambassador to Angola; 2018–2021	Succeeded by Roger Stringer
