= It's Been a Bad Week =

It’s Been a Bad Week
- Genre: Comedy
- Running time: 30 mins
- Country of origin: United Kingdom
- Language: English
- Home station: BBC Radio 2
- Hosted by: Steve Punt; Hugh Dennis
- Original release: 11 February 1999 – 22 June 2006
- No. of series: 14
- No. of episodes: 105 (including unaired episode)

It’s Been a Bad Week is a British radio comedy on BBC Radio 2 that first broadcast on 11 February 1999. It was presented by Steve Punt and Hugh Dennis, and is also referred to as Punt and Dennis: It's Been a Bad Week. More than one hundred episodes have been broadcast as of 2006, with the last airing on 22 June 2006. Mitch Benn has confirmed in 2008 that the show has "bitten the dust". It was normally broadcast on Thursdays at 10pm, with each episode being repeated on Saturdays at 1:30pm. The show was recorded the week of broadcast at Ronnie Scott's Jazz Club.

The show was co-presented by regular guests Mitch Benn, Toby Longworth (Series 6 onwards), Sue Perkins (Series 6 onwards) and Simon Greenall (Series 8 onwards). Past co-presenters have been Mervyn Stutter (Series 1-2), Jon Culshaw (Series 1-5), Emma Clarke (Series 1-5) and Jo Caulfield (Series 6), although these varied in some weeks. One guest appearance was by Canadian actor Leslie Nielsen (series 3, episode 8). The other contributor to the show was their fictional sound effects man, "Van Man", so called because he supplied the sound effects from his white van, "illegally parked outside Ronnie Scott's." It’s Been a Bad Week is a mock awards show in which true stories and urban legends competed for the tongue-twisting “Worst Week of the Week Award, Awarded Weekly, on a Week-By-Week Basis.”

Episodes are sometimes repeated on BBC Radio 4 Extra.

== Format ==
Each show originally began with the "Bad Week Round-up", which is described as the section for "Bad Week stories they couldn't fit anywhere else". This was a quick two-minute recap of what had been going on in the news that week. This was later replaced with "Van Man's Week of Sound", where Van Man illustrated that week's news with his sound effects. Currently, Van Man just plays the main sound effect of the week. A recurring gag is that Van Man's sound effect seems to refer to one of the week's main news stories but actually refers to a different one.

The show consists of three sections, "Sections 1, 2 and 3". In each section, there are three or sometimes four stories from around the world of bad things which have really happened. Usually each section consists of one story related by Punt, one by Dennis and one by another presenter. Benn normally chooses a music-related candidate and sings a song relating to it, Longworth or Greenall often do stories about dumb criminals (frequently American), and Perkins covers something sexual. Sometimes there will be a "Bad Week Update", where a story previously featured returns, because either the same thing has happened again or a new aspect to the story has surfaced.

In every section, Van Man illustrates each story with his sound effects. Originally he also chose the winner of each section; now it is done by a topical "guest announcer" (impersonated). After the three finalists are chosen, the audience take their electronic keypads (also fictional) and vote for the winner of "The Worst Week of the Week Award, Awarded Weekly, on a Week-By-Week Basis". The prize changes from week to week, depending on the theme of the show.

The series has had several New Year specials, entitled It's Been A Bad Year, awarding (as it was put in one episode) "The Worst New Year of the New Year Award, Awarded New Yearly, on a First Week-by-First Week Basis". Further, the last show of the current year has a different award, "The Worst Week of the Year Award, Awarded Yearly on a Year-By-Year Basis"

== Series ==
=== First series ===
1. 11 February 1999
2. 18 February 1999
3. 25 February 1999
4. 4 March 1999
5. 11 March 1999
6. 18 March 1999

=== Second series ===
1. 29 July 1999
2. 5 August 1999
3. 12 August 1999
4. 19 August 1999
5. 26 August 1999
6. 4 September 1999

=== Third series ===
1. 17 February 2000
2. 24 February 2000
3. 2 March 2000
4. 9 March 2000
5. 16 March 2000
6. 23 March 2000
7. 30 March 2000
8. 6 April 2000

=== Fourth series ===
1. 23 November 2000
2. 30 November 2000
3. 7 December 2000
4. 14 December 2000
5. 21 December 2000
6. 28 December 2000
7. 4 January 2001
8. 11 January 2001

=== Fifth series ===
1. 17 November 2001
2. 22 November 2001
3. 29 November 2001
4. 6 December 2001
5. 13 December 2001
6. 20 December 2001
7. 27 December 2001

=== Sixth series ===
1. 20 June 2002
2. 27 June 2002
3. 4 July 2002
4. 11 July 2002
5. 18 July 2002
6. 25 July 2002
7. 1 August 2002

=== Seventh series ===
1. 31 October 2002
2. 7 November 2002
3. 16 November 2002
4. 21 November 2002
5. 28 November 2002
6. 5 December 2002
7. 12 December 2002
8. 19 December 2002
9. 26 December 2002
10. 2 January 2003

=== Eighth series ===
1. 15 May 2003
2. 22 May 2003
3. 29 May 2003
4. 5 June 2003
5. 12 June 2003
6. 19 June 2003
7. 26 June 2003
8. 3 July 2003
9. 10 July 2003
10. 17 July 2003

=== Ninth series ===
1. 13 November 2003
2. 20 November 2003
3. 27 November 2003
4. 4 December 2003
5. 11 December 2003
6. 18 December 2003
7. 25 December 2003
8. 1 January 2004

=== Tenth series ===
1. 13 May 2004
2. 20 May 2004
3. 27 May 2004
4. 3 June 2004
5. 10 June 2004
6. 17 June 2004
7. 24 June 2004
8. 1 July 2004
9. 8 July 2004

=== Eleventh series ===
1. 23 December 2004
2. 30 December 2004
3. 6 January 2005
4. 13 January 2005
5. 20 January 2005
6. 27 January 2005
7. 3 February 2005
8. 10 February 2005
9. 17 February 2005

=== Twelfth series ===
1. 2 June 2005
2. 9 June 2005
3. 16 June 2005
4. 23 June 2005
5. 30 June 2005
6. 7 July 2005 (not broadcast owing to the London Bombings)

=== Thirteenth series ===
1. 1 October 2005
2. 8 October 2005
3. 15 October 2005
4. 22 October 2005
5. 29 October 2005

=== Fourteenth series ===
1. 18 May 2006
2. 25 May 2006
3. 1 June 2006
4. 8 June 2006
5. 15 June 2006
6. 22 June 2006

== See also ==
- Other mock awards ceremonies include the Darwin Awards, the Ig Nobel Prize and the Razzies
- Other weekly topical radio comedies include Week Ending, The News Quiz and The Now Show, the latter also being hosted by Punt and Dennis
