= Rockford's Rock Opera =

Rockford's Rock Opera album cover

Rockford's Rock Opera is a series of ecological musical stories created by Matthew Sweetapple, Steve Punt and Elaine Sweetapple. It was first released on the Internet and later as a three album set by Sweetapple in 2010. There are four Rockford's Rock Opera stories. Lost on Infinity (2010), The King of Nowhere (2015), The Spooo Who Grew (2017) and The End of Infinity (2022).

Rockford's Rock Opera uses audio visual resources and audiobook stories to teach about extinction, ecology, biomimetics (biomimicry) and biodiversity. The project has been referenced by the BGCI. It has also been noted in The Times and The Guardian. The creators have discussed the project on BBC Radio, including a feature on BBC Radio 4's Go4it.

The stories introduce the Island of Infinity. This is the home of the last single representative of every extinct animal and plant species. Key characters include Cocklebur Ick, the Registrar, Dectopus, Feeble Beetle and The Herculous. The project also features non fictional species such as the passenger pigeon, great auk, moa and thylacine.

Rockford's Rock Opera has been described as an "Adventure in Sound". Influences noted by reviewers include The Hitchhiker's Guide to the Galaxy, Jeff Wayne's War of the Worlds, Roger Glover's Butterfly Ball and Harry Nilsson's The Point. The Guardian described it as an "ingenious... thoroughly modern musical". The Times described it as a "cult favourite as beloved as Wallace and Gromit".

Rockford's Rock Opera is available in online and mobile formats. These provide access to audio visual materials and different versions of the story. On Apple iPhone and Android devices, Part One is available as a free app.

Rockford's Rock Opera's ecological themes have led to cooperative links with environmental organisations and charities including WWF, Buglife and the BGCI.

After several school performances, Lost on Infinity has been performed on stage at venues including the London Museum and The Bull Theatre in London.

A fully illustrated book edition of Lost on Infinity was released in 2025. It includes access to the accompanying musical audiobook.

Cover of Lost on Infinity

== History ==
Rockford's Rock Opera grew from the success of a Sweetapple song released with the help of Gerry Bron on behalf of Battersea Dogs and Cats Home called "Rockford's Christmas" which entered the UK singles chart in 2004.
