= Rob Newman (comedian) =

British comedian (b. 1964)

Robert Newman
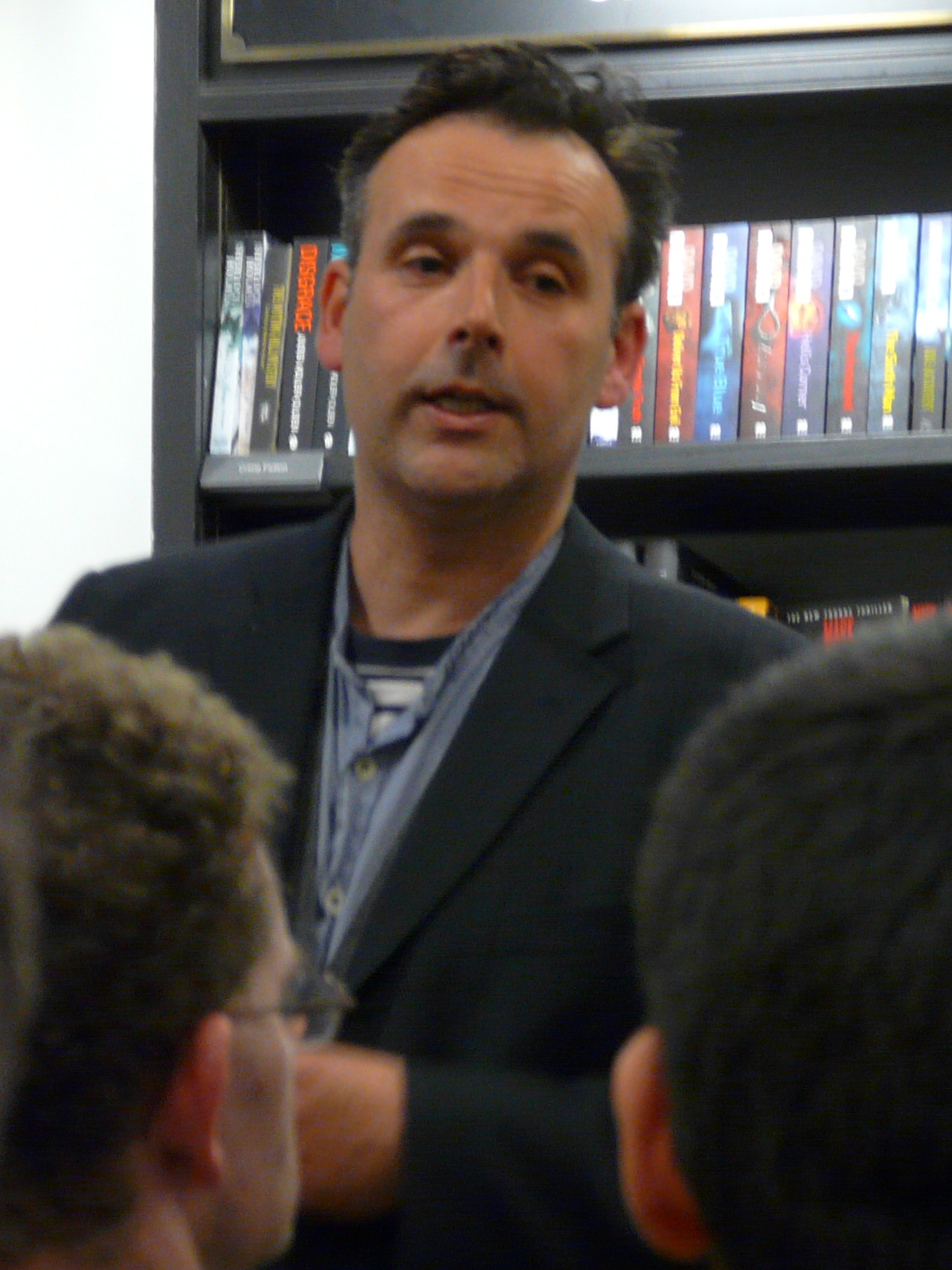
- Newman at a reading and signing for his novel The Trade Secret in 2013
- Born: 7 July 1964 (age 62)
- Occupations: Comedian; Author; Actor
- Known for: Political activism
- Website: www.robnewman.com

Robert Newman (born 7 July 1964) is an English comedian, author and political activist. Newman found mainstream fame with The Mary Whitehouse Experience before forming a successful partnership with one of the programme's other comedians, David Baddiel, in the early 1990s.

In 1993, Newman and Baddiel became the first comedians to play and sell out the 12,000-seat Wembley Arena in London. Newman's first speaking appearance was with Third World First (now known as People and Planet), the student political organisation.

== Early life and education ==
Newman was adopted into a working-class family who lived in a Hertfordshire village. His adoptive father died when he was nine. Newman attended a comprehensive school, received poor A-level grades and was not offered a place at university until two years later, when he was admitted to Selwyn College, Cambridge, to read English on the strength of an essay about T. S. Eliot.

Newman has worked as a farmhand, warehouse-man, house-painter, teacher, mail-sorter, social worker and mover.

== Comedy career ==
Newman began his comedy career as an impressionist in the late 1980s before gaining fame when he appeared alongside fellow Cambridge alumnus David Baddiel, Hugh Dennis and Steve Punt in the BBC radio and TV programme The Mary Whitehouse Experience (1989–92). The title referred to the main campaigner for "moral decency" on television, Mary Whitehouse. With The Mary Whitehouse Experience Newman and Baddiel had become "unlikely pin-ups as, in the early 1990s, comedy was being fêted as 'the new rock and roll'," leading to their series, Newman and Baddiel in Pieces (1993).

The partnership with Baddiel was widely reported as being fraught with tension. Unlike most double acts, their shows (both on TV and stage) were characterised by the two alternately delivering monologues, rarely appearing together except in sketches (most famously, History Today). During the "Live and in Pieces" tour, relations deteriorated further and the Wembley Arena show was their last appearance together.

After the break-up, the two men took wildly differing career paths. While Baddiel became part of the "new lad" phenomenon of the mid-1990s, fronting shows like Fantasy Football League, Newman largely disappeared from public life, reappearing with solo work marked by a clear social conscience and anti-establishment views. He covered the anti-globalisation Seattle protests of 1999 for the UK's Channel 4 News. He has been politically active with Reclaim the Streets, the Liverpool Dockers, Indymedia and People's Global Action.

His later work is characterised by a very strong political element. It parallels the work of contemporaries such as Mark Thomas. In 2001, with actress Emma Thompson, he called for a boycott of the Perrier Comedy Award, because Perrier is owned by Nestlé who market powdered baby milk in developing countries; an alternative competition called the Tap Water Awards was set up the following year. In 2003, Newman toured with From Caliban to the Taliban, which was released on CD and DVD. In 2005, the show Apocalypso Now or, from P45 to AK47, How to Grow the Economy with the Use of War debuted at the Bongo Club during the 2005 Edinburgh Festival Fringe. Apocalypso Now toured nationally, sometimes as part of a double-bill where Newman was joined by Mark Thomas. The show was filmed at the Hoxton Hall in Hoxton, east London and shown on More4 under the title A History of Oil, with a later release on CD and DVD. A mixture of stand-up comedy and introductory lecture on geopolitics and peak oil, in Apocalypso Now Newman argues that twentieth-century Western foreign policy, including World War I, should be seen as a continuous struggle by the West to control Middle Eastern oil. Newman draws from Richard Heinberg's book The Party's Over: Oil, War, and the Fate of Industrial Societies as source material for portions of the show dealing with peak oil.

In 2006, Newman performed a new show, No Planet B or, The History of the World Backwards, at the Tricycle Theatre in Kilburn, north-west London. In 2007, the BBC commissioned a six-part series, The History of the World Backwards based on No Planet B, for transmission on BBC Four. The script of the stage version show is accessible on Newman's official website.

In 2015, his BBC Radio 4 programme Robert Newman's Entirely Accurate Encyclopaedia of Evolution attempted to challenge some of the concepts of Richard Dawkins's book The Selfish Gene. It won the Best Scripted Comedy with a Live Audience award at the 2017 BBC Audio Drama Awards.

== Writing ==
Newman co-wrote The Mary Whitehouse Experience Encyclopedia (1991), with David Baddiel, Hugh Dennis, and Steve Punt.

He has written four novels: Dependence Day (1994); Manners (1998); The Fountain at the Centre of the World (2003); and The Trade Secret (2013).

In 2015 his book The Entirely Accurate Encyclopaedia of Evolution, based on his stand-up show "Robert Newman's New Theory of Evolution", was published by Freight Books.

In April 2017 his book Neuropolis was published by HarperCollins.

=== The Fountain at the Centre of the World ===
Dwight Garner, an editor of The New York Times Book Review, reviewed The Fountain at the Centre of the World favourably, saying "I wouldn't be surprised, in fact, if [it] became the talismanic Catch-22 of the anti-globalisation protest movement, the fictional complement to Naomi Klein's influential treatise No Logo".

Newman's process of writing the book was the subject of a 2008 BBC Two television documentary entitled Scribbling.

== Filmography and bibliography ==
=== The Mary Whitehouse Experience ===
- 1989 – The Mary Whitehouse Experience (radio series).
- 1990 – The Mary Whitehouse Experience (television series).
- 1991 – The Mary Whitehouse Experience Encyclopedia (series companion book) (Co-authored with David Baddiel, Hugh Dennis, and Steve Punt.)

=== Newman and Baddiel ===
- 1991 – From the Mary Whitehouse Experience (live VHS release).
- 1992 – History Today (live VHS release).
- 1993 – Newman and Baddiel in Pieces (television series).
- 1993 – Live and in Pieces (live VHS release).

=== Solo career ===
- 1994 – Dependence Day (novel).
- 1994 – The Dependence Day Video (live VHS release).
- 1998 – Manners (novel).
- 2001 – Resistance is Fertile (live VHS release).
- 2003 – Scribbling (television special).
- 2003 – The Fountain at the Centre of the World (novel). ISBN 1-85984-573-8 (10).
- 2004 – From Caliban to the Taliban: 500 Years of Humanitarian Intervention (live DVD release).
- 2004 – From Caliban to the Taliban: 500 Years of Humanitarian Intervention (live limited edition handmade 2 cd release).
- 2005 – Apocalypso Now or, from P45 to AK47, how to Grow the Economy with the Use of War (live 2 cd release).
- 2006 – A History of Oil (television special).
- 2007 – A History of Oil (live DVD release).
- 2007 – The History of the World Backwards (television series).
- 2013 – The Trade Secret (novel) ISBN 1-90888-517-3 (10)
- 2017 – Neuropolis (radio series)
- 2018 – Rob Newman's Total Eclipse of Descartes (radio series)
- 2020 – Rob Newman's Half-Full Philosophy Hour (radio series)
- 2022 – Rob Newman On Air (radio series)

== See also ==
- Nestlé boycott in the media
- Newman and Baddiel in Pieces
