= The Hurting (TV series) =

British television series

- Genre: Comedy clip show
- Written by: Jake Yapp; Cornelius Mendez
- Narrated by: Jake Yapp
- Theme music composer: Jake Yapp
- Country of origin: United Kingdom
- Original language: English
- No. of series: 3
- No. of episodes: 60

Production
- Executive producers: Jonathan Skogmo; Josh Entman; Mark Rafalowski; Dan Trunfio; Iain Coyle; Joe McVey; John Quinn
- Producer: Bob Kennedy
- Running time: 30 minutes (inc. adverts)
- Production companies: Swan Burst Media / North One Television (for reversioning), Dick Clark Productions (original show)

Original release
- Network: Dave
- Release: 27 November 2017 – present

The Hurting is a British television series first broadcast in 2017 on Dave. The show is narrated by Jake Yapp and broadcasts humorous home and viral videos.

The show is a British version of US show Fail Army with a new voiceover.
