= The Imaginatively Titled Punt & Dennis Show =

- Also known as: Punt & Dennis
- Written by: Steve Punt; Hugh Dennis
- Starring: Steve Punt; Hugh Dennis
- Country of origin: United Kingdom
- Original language: English
- No. of series: 2
- No. of episodes: 12

Production
- Executive producer: Jon Plowman
- Producer: David Tyler
- Production company: BBC

Original release
- Network: BBC One
- Release: 7 July 1994 – 7 September 1995

Related
- The Mary Whitehouse Experience; Canned Carrott; The Now Show

The Imaginatively Titled Punt & Dennis Show, known simply as Punt and Dennis throughout its second series, is a British stand-up and sketch show written by and starring comedians Steve Punt and Hugh Dennis. The first series of 6 episodes was broadcast between 7 July and 11 August 1994.

The second series, also of 6 episodes, was broadcast on Fridays at 20:30 (episodes 1 and 2) and 20:00 (episodes 3, 4 and 5) between 28 July and 1 September 1995, except for the last episode which was broadcast on Thursday 7 September at 22:45 (there was no episode shown on 11 August 1995).

== Overview ==
The two had already appeared as a double act in The Mary Whitehouse Experience and Canned Carrott.

Impressionists Alistair McGowan and Ronni Ancona were among the guests on the show.

There were several character inventions in the sketches, such as "The Gullibles", who were always falling for scams, as well as a number of Punt and Dennis's characters from The Mary Whitehouse Experience, such as the milk-obsessed "Mr Strange". There were also spoofs from TV programmes such as Baywatch and The X-Files.

The second series also featured performances by tribute bands; these included Björn Again in episode 1; The Bootleg Beatles in episode 2; The Counterfeit Stones in episode 3; The LA Doors in episode 4; The Royal Family (a Queen tribute band) in episode 5; and T.Rextasy (a T. Rex tribute band) in episode 6.

== Characters ==
The show featured a mix of stand-up, spoofs of known television series, but also a number of character based sketches. These characters and sketches included:

- Mr Strange a man obsessed with milk and disgusting things to do with it. He briefly informs the audience of his latest 'experiment' and usually signs off with his catchphrase "milky-milky". (played by Hugh Dennis)
- Norris Employed by the BBC as a weatherman as part of a home-office scheme to help rehabilitate habitual criminals, Norris' forecasts feature advice to take advantage of specific weather conditions to break into people's homes and "get yourself something nice!". (Hugh Dennis, Series 2)
- Kurt Wenker a living stereotype of the buff, tanned, German guy in charge of handing out the windsurf boards in holiday destinations. Kurt constantly intimidates British male tourists and jokes about stealing their girlfriends. (Hugh Dennis)
- World of Wine and World of Whisky. A programme presented by a man called Tarquin (Punt) and alcoholic wine connoisseur Michael (Dennis). Tarquin attempts to maintain the pomp and circumstance of presenting a professional programme about wines and spirits while Michael, slurs his way through viewers Q&A sessions criticising their attempts to do anything with wine other than drink it.
- Update With Tony Shannon and Ian Pye News anchors Tony Shannon (Dennis) and Ian Pye (Punt), who constantly introduce each other and the news headlines without ever actually reading any news.
- The Rt. Hon. Hector Sleazely MP A member of parliament who is constantly in the middle of a scandal and attempts to explain himself in a statement to reporters. The statement is laced with word play, mostly homonyms, to the point where the long speech is generally meaningless. Sleazely always ends with his insistence that he will not be resigning before awkwardly resigning from making the statement. (Hugh Dennis)
- Do you Fancy a Bit of a Brew? A lazy, dishonest tradesman (Dennis) who is always caught having a cup of tea, mainly because that is all he does. Any building work he does is usually shoddy and dangerous.
- Any Way you Want It Two sketches (the first is in a fast food restaurant, the other in a garage) featuring the same two characters, one of whom (Gary - Dennis) is not very bright. These two characters first appeared in Canned Carrott.
- The Jockeys Two jockeys sitting in a pub either discussing their races as racing commentators would (i.e. rather quickly), or referring to pint-sized personalities like Prince or Ronnie Corbett as 'big men' - referring to the fact that jockeys are typically very short people.
- Martin An alcoholic, chain-smoking hit-man (Dennis) who has been asked to do one last job supposedly to take out an assassin (McGowan), but has actually been duped by Dane (Punt) as he is incompetent and supposedly bound to get the job wrong.
- Embarrassing Dad A father (Dennis) embarrasses his children by tactlessly telling one of his daughter's teachers that she fancies him, or ordering food in McDonald's and eating the packaging only to make matters worse by saying 'No-one's watching!'. Also appeared in the Mary Whitehouse Experience constantly gatecrashing a party and saying that what ever is being played on the stereo 'has a good beat' when it isn't necessarily music.
