= Laura Shavin =

British actress and comedian (born 1965)

Laura Helen Shavin (born in Islington, London) is a British actress, voice over artist, presenter, narrator and comedian.

== Career ==
Shavin has played supporting roles on television and works full-time as a voice-over artist, as well as performing on Radio 4 comedy programmes. In particular, she was a regular performer on The Now Show for several years.

She has performed in several theatre plays including four at the Royal National Theatre.

In 1990, Shavin played Stephanie, the daughter of Daisy and Onslow, and the niece of Hyacinth Bucket (surname pronounced as "Bouquet"), in Keeping Up Appearances in the episode "The Christening".

She presented a Saturday evening radio show between 16:00 and 18:00 on BBC Essex, between 10 May and 2 August 2014 and recommencing on 9 May until 1 August 2015.

Her most recent BBC radio appearance was playing various callers in the second series of Call Jonathan Pie in 2025.

Shavin has presented The Offcuts Drawer podcast since 2020.
