= List of ambassadors of the United Kingdom to Angola =

The ambassador of the United Kingdom to Angola is the United Kingdom's foremost diplomatic representative in the Republic of Angola, and head of the UK's diplomatic mission in Luanda.

Since 1980 the British ambassador to Angola is also accredited to the Democratic Republic of São Tomé and Príncipe.

== Ambassadors ==
- 1978–1981: Sir Hugh Campbell Byatt
- 1981–1983: Sir Francis Kennedy
- 1983–1985: Sir Marrack Goulding
- 1985–1987: Sir Patrick Fairweather
- 1987–1990: James Glaze
- 1990–1993: John Gerrard Flynn
- 1993–1995: Anthony Richard Thomas
- 1995–1998: Roger Dudley Hart
- 1998–2002: Caroline Elmes
- 2002–2005: John Thompson
- 2005–2007: Ralph Publicover
- 2007–2009: Patricia Phillips
- 2010–2014: Richard Wildash
- 2014–2018: John Dennis
- 2018–2021: Jessica Hand
- 2021–2024: Roger Stringer
- 2024–present: Bharat Joshi
