= The Now Show =

British radio comedy show

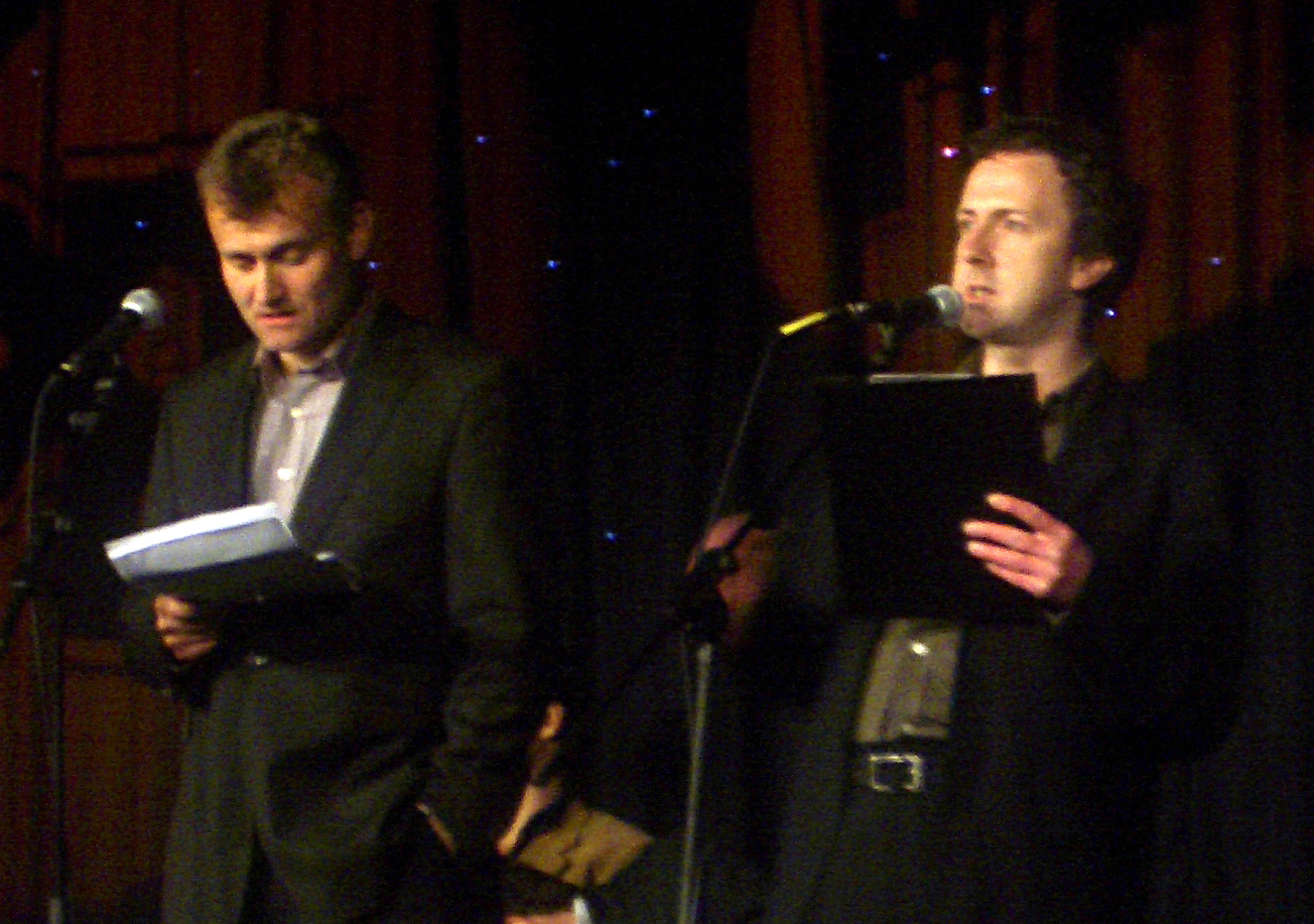
- Hugh Dennis (left) and Steve Punt at the 2005 Radio Festival, Edinburgh.
- Genre: Comedy
- Running time: 30 mins
- Country of origin: United Kingdom
- Language: English
- Home station: BBC Radio 4
- Starring: Steve Punt; Hugh Dennis; Jon Holmes; Mitch Benn; Marcus Brigstocke; Laura Shavin
- Created by: Bill Dare
- Produced by: Aled Evans (series 1–3), Colin Anderson (Series 19–20 & 25–27 & 31), Katie Marsden (Series 21–25), Ed Morrish (Series 26–28), Julia McKenzie (Series 29)
- Recording studio: BBC Radio Theatre, Broadcasting House, RADA Studios
- Original release: 26 September 1998 – 19 April 2024
- No. of series: 64
- No. of episodes: 466 (as of 6 March 2024
- Website: www.bbc.co.uk/programmes/b006qgt7
- Podcast: Podcast Download

The Now Show is a British radio comedy programme on BBC Radio 4 which satirises the weekly news. The show, which ran from 1998 to 2024, is a mixture of stand-up, sketches and songs hosted by Steve Punt and Hugh Dennis. It features regular appearances by Jon Holmes, Laura Shavin (earlier series had Jane Bussmann, Emma Clarke, Emma Kennedy, or occasionally Sue Perkins, for the female voices), a monologue by Marcus Brigstocke, and music by Mitch Benn, Pippa Evans or Adam Kay. Later series feature a wider range of contributors.

Most episodes feature a special guest, including Robin Ince, Rory Bremner, Dave Gorman, Simon Munnery, Al Murray, Andy Zaltzman, Paul Sinha, Richard Stilgoe, Dr Phil Hammond, Barry Cryer, John Finnemore, Andy Parsons, Shappi Khorsandi, Nathan Caton, Grace Petrie, Sarah Kendall and Francesca Martinez. Jon Culshaw featured on the 2004 and 2005 Christmas editions and also starred in the 2008 Christmas edition. Guests have also stood in for absent cast members.

The series was a successor to the early 1990s topical comedy show The Mary Whitehouse Experience, in which Punt and Dennis were a key part, although its origins lie with the short-lived Live on Arrival from 1988. The programme first aired on 26 September 1998. Repeats of The Now Show are now aired on BBC Radio 4 Extra.

In early series each episode was introduced by Burt Kwouk announcing “The Now Show” in an increasingly shrill voice on the word “show”. This tradition continued with Hugh Dennis doing the honours.

In October 2016, long-running cast member Jon Holmes reported that he had been fired because 'the BBC want to recast with more women and diversity.'

In March 2024, it was announced that the spring 2024 series would be its last, with Punt and Dennis presenting a new BBC radio 4 show RouteMasters.

The show concluded on the 19th of April 2024.

== Broadcast and podcast ==
The programme is recorded in front of a studio audience on the Thursday evening before the Friday broadcast. On Friday 22 July 2005, The Now Show was broadcast without a studio audience due to the attempted 21 July 2005 London Bombings. The show's then regular venue, The Drill Hall was close to the site of one of the failed bomb attacks and had been cordoned off by police; as such the show had to be recorded in the Radio 4 studios at Broadcasting House. Hugh Dennis opened the show with the words "with us are Laura Shavin, Jon Holmes, Marcus Brigstocke and Mitch Benn... and no audience".

The 18th series, running from April to May 2006, was the first Radio 4 comedy series to be made available on podcast, as part of a trial, or to be downloaded directly from the BBC Radio 4 web page, both for seven days after broadcast. The podcast had some of the music (from outside sources) cut because of restrictions due to artist royalties (although a new joke was inserted in place of the music, such as "Don't worry, it'll be over in a minute", or rants about the BBC's lawyers), although the complete show could still be heard for seven days after the broadcast on the BBC's listen again feature. This podcast was the fourth most popular podcast in August 2006, according to Schott's Almanac. However, due to the end of the trial, the 22nd series, running from June to August 2007, was not available for download. The podcast returned, as part of the "Friday Night Comedy" podcast, alternating with The News Quiz and Dead Ringers.

The Now Show Wikipedia Excerpt
An excerpt from the podcast version of the show, satirising Wikipedia for its use as a cheating tool by GCSE students - 565KB

== The Vote Now Show ==
A version of the show entitled The Vote Now Show has been broadcast in the run-up to the 2010, 2015 UK general elections and 2017 UK general elections. The format is broadly the same, incorporating many of the show's regular performers and an additional political guest interviewed by Punt and Dennis. The episodes are more frequent than usual and the programme is transmitted at 11pm on the day of recording, so it can incorporate that day's campaign news to make it more topical. The first series had three programmes a week on Mondays, Tuesdays and Wednesdays, in 2015 it was twice weekly (Mondays and Fridays). Clips of politicians are more likely to feature, as the broadcasting restrictions for House of Commons footage do not apply to election events.

== The Now Show 2012 Live ==
During the London 2012 Olympics a similar run of six live programmes based on the ongoing events entitled The Now Show 2012 Live was broadcast.

== Reception ==
The Now Show was voted as the "Best British Radio Panel Show/Satire" for 2008 in The Comedy.co.uk Awards.

In March 2009, Steve Punt and Hugh Dennis were criticised for comparing the planned comeback of 1980s pop star Michael Jackson with that of the IRA.

== Books and merchandise ==
Punt and Dennis, together with Holmes and other cast members, published two books, The Now Show Book and The Now Show Book of World Records.

A collection of four episodes of the series from 2002 were released on CD and audio cassette on 29 July 2002. A further collection of highlights from the 2004–2005 series was released for download through Audible.com and iTunes.
