= The Mary Whitehouse Experience =

British television series

- Created by: Bill Dare
- Starring: David Baddiel; Rob Newman; Steve Punt; Hugh Dennis
- Opening theme: "Jack to the Sound of the Underground" by Hithouse
- Composers: Peter Slaghuis, Simon Brint
- Country of origin: United Kingdom
- No. of episodes: 44

Production
- Executive producers: William Sargent; Joanna Beresford
- Producers: Marcus Mortimer, Armando Iannucci
- Running time: 30 mins
- Production companies: BBC, Spitting Image Productions

Original release
- Network: BBC Radio 1 (March 1989-December 1990), BBC2
- Release: 3 October 1990 – 6 April 1992

Related
- The Imaginatively Titled Punt & Dennis Show; Newman and Baddiel in Pieces

The Mary Whitehouse Experience is a British topical sketch comedy show that the BBC produced in association with Spitting Image Productions. It starred two comedy double acts, one being David Baddiel and Rob Newman, the other Steve Punt and Hugh Dennis; all four comedians had graduated from Cambridge University. It was broadcast on both radio and television in the late 1980s and early 1990s.

The show was named after Mary Whitehouse, a campaigner against what she saw as a decline in television standards and public morality. She became the target of mockery in the United Kingdom for her attitudes. The BBC feared Whitehouse would initiate litigation for the use of her name in the show's title, and for a period the alternative title The William Rees-Mogg Experience was considered.

== BBC Radio One show ==
A radio pilot was broadcast on 10 March 1989 on BBC Radio 1 and a series of 13 shows began on 7 April the same year. Bill Dare devised the format. The two pairings of Newman and Baddiel and Punt and Dennis were central to the show, with support from Nick Hancock, Jo Brand, Jack Dee, Mark Thomas and Mark Hurst. The show also included musical interludes from Skint Video and The Tracy Brothers.

It was originally aired at midnight on Friday. It was subsequently moved to a 10:30pm slot, before being moved again for its fourth and final series to 7pm on Saturday evenings. The show ran for four series and a special (44 episodes in total) from March 1989 to December 1990.

== Television ==
A television pilot aired on BBC2 shortly before the fourth and final radio series, on 3 October 1990. The first series started on 3 January 1991 and ran for six episodes, with a second set of six episodes in 1992.

The television series was a mix of observational comedy sketches and monologues, in a format similar to shows such as Mr. Show and The Kids in the Hall. The show featured a lot of satirical takes on famous people, films and TV shows of the day along with original character material.

Each show was made up of sections usually headed by a caption relating to the topic about to be discussed. The caption took the form of 'The [topic] Experience'. One of the performers would begin talking about the topic in monologue form, sometimes with input from another performer who appeared in character. The monologue would make reference to a humorous scenario which would be played out in sketch form, returning either to the same topic or moving on to a different or loosely related one. Lines or characters from sketches might recur throughout the show either as a continuation of the original sketch or an invasion of another one.

The pace of the show was fairly rapid, helped by the inclusion of a boom camera in the studio which panned quickly around the audience and back to the stage at the beginning of each monologue. Each section was punctuated with a small excerpt of the theme music, Jack to the Sound of the Underground.

A companion book to the series was released in 1991, titled The Mary Whitehouse Experience Encyclopedia, which contains references to some of the sketches featured on the show and much new additional material.

== Recurring characters ==
=== Ray ===
(played by Rob Newman)

A man afflicted with a disease that gives him a permanently sarcastic tone of voice, so that everything he says comes out sounding sarcastic, no matter how sincerely he means it. This sketch is presented as a medical case history told by Ray's psychiatrist (played by David Baddiel), who gives accounts of various situations in which Ray's affliction has got him into trouble. These are usually sensitive situations such as speaking out at a funeral, apologising to an old man after running over his wife in his car, and complimenting a suicidal child on his drawings. At other times Ray has experienced near-fatal accidents, such as having an arrow shot through his brain, which are ignored by passers-by given that even his cries of pain sound sarcastic. Ray's disorder also affects his body language, as demonstrated in one sketch in which he converses with his deaf foster mother. Ray's psychiatrist discovers that the only things Ray's voice can say normally are those that he means sarcastically. In one sketch he makes friends with some media types, who appreciate his seemingly endless sarcasm when talking about the film Edward Scissorhands. In the final episode, on being given a Cure album as a present, Ray cannot bring himself to sound sarcastic when thanking his friend and, bizarrely, starts speaking Flemish. Ray has quite a successful run of appearances on Flemish chat-shows, before the inevitable happens, and he begins speaking Flemish in a sarcastic tone. Ray often uses the phrase "Oh no, what a personal disaster" which became one of the show's most popular catchphrases.

=== Ivan ===
(played by Rob Newman)

Ivan is a daytime television presenter who hosts a show similar to the BBC's Pebble Mill at One. He appears at first glance to be like any normal daytime TV presenter; however, his appearance becomes increasingly unusual as the sketches progress (his hair ends up extremely ruffled and he has plasters on his face). Ivan is very overemotional and will fly into a tormented rage at the slightest mention of anything vaguely bad. One such example is when a professional gardener he is interviewing tells him in passing that someone has trodden on and broken a garden cane he was going to use, and Ivan proceeds to fly into a hysterical rage and smash apart the whole greenhouse. Likewise, when informed that the situation is not so bad after all, Ivan will similarly react in an overly ecstatic manner, much to the annoyance of his guests.

=== Mr. Strange ===
(played by Hugh Dennis, better known as the 'Milky Milky' sketch)

Mr. Strange is the archetypal 'man your mother warned you about', the weird man who walks around town in a dirty old mac, indulging in disturbingly eccentric behaviour. Mr. Strange's main trait is that he has an absurd addiction to off milk that is, and is always carrying cartons or bottles of milk with him, not only drinking from them but obsessively sniffing them before uttering the words "Lovely—Milky Milky" (which became another one of the show's most popular catchphrases). This led to a 1992 novelty tie-in single "Milky Milky (Take Me to the Fridge)" by Mr Strange and the Lactose Brotherhood, as well as Punt and Dennis' tour of the same year being named "The Milky Milky Tour".

One sketch features Mr. Strange as a contestant on Mastermind whose specialist subject is 'Milk and the way it smells' while another features him presenting a Party political broadcast offering himself as an alternative to the main political leaders because "I don't wash my pants—it's not nature's way".

=== History Today ===
History Today made its debut in the second half of the show's second TV series. History Today is a supposed historical discussion TV programme presented by two elderly, scholarly professors, both well-spoken and well-groomed. The first of these professors, who introduces each 'episode' and its topic of discussion, is played by David Baddiel although the character is never named. The second is Professor F. J. Lewis, Emeritus Professor of History at All Souls College, Oxford, who is played by Rob Newman. Each 'episode' begins as a standard historical debate, but quickly degenerates into a playground-style quarrel with the professors exchanging childish insults. The humour lies largely in the juxtaposition of the professors' formal tone of voice with their puerile words. This sketch spawned perhaps the show's most popular catchphrase "...That's you, that is", spoken after they had described someone/something supposedly pathetic and/or disgusting. This sketch was later carried over into Newman and Baddiel's own show, Newman and Baddiel in Pieces.

== Parodies ==
Robert Smith (played by Rob Newman)

A parody of the singer Robert Smith, front-man with the British rock band The Cure. This was prompted by Baddiel's observation that, although the band's earlier material had been recorded in a downbeat, 'doom and gloom' Gothic rock style, they had later moved in a more poppy direction (with singles such as "Friday I'm in Love"). Each sketch features Robert Smith and The Cure performing a particularly happy, cheery song or nursery rhyme in the band's goth style. The songs included "Tie Me Kangaroo Down Sport" (originally by Rolf Harris), "The Laughing Policeman" and Tommy Steele's "Flash Bang Wallop". Robert Smith himself also made a guest appearance on the final episode of the show, in the last of the 'Ray' sketches, in which he was seen to sing "The Sun Has Got His Hat On".

Edward Colanderhands (played by Rob Newman)

A parody of the Tim Burton film Edward Scissorhands, which featured a similar character but with colanders for hands instead of scissors. He was seen in a sketch helping a housewife to drain vegetables. He was also present in the Robert Smith sketch as an audience member clapping to the beat of the songs, instead of clapping his hands he clapped his colanders together and unlike the rest of the audience he showed immense enjoyment of the performance. He later returned as "Edward 'Good Movie Guide' Knob".

Mark and Tim

A parody of Mark Gardener and Tim Burgess. Rob Newman admits to growing his hair to look like Mark Gardener and Tim Burgess (members of, respectively, the bands Ride and the Charlatans), and while praising their musical accomplishments, he demonstrates why you wouldn't want to 'hang out with them' in several scenarios. These include playing football, helping to check if Rob's car brake lights are working and as backup while Rob is being held at knifepoint. In each scenario, Tim and Mark both remain silent and motionless apart from moving their heads slowly from side to side.

== Repeats ==
The majority of the first three radio series were repeated on BBC 7 in 2003. However, rights issues precluded further transmissions, although there have been very occasional one-off airings in the Saturday morning Comedy Controller slot. A run of selected episodes started on Friday nights in September 2013.

Although there were edited compilation repeats of the television series on the BBC within a year of the original broadcasts, it has never been released on home video.

== See also ==
- Newman and Baddiel in Pieces
- The Imaginatively Titled Punt & Dennis Show
