= Steve Punt =

British writer, comedian and actor (born 1962)

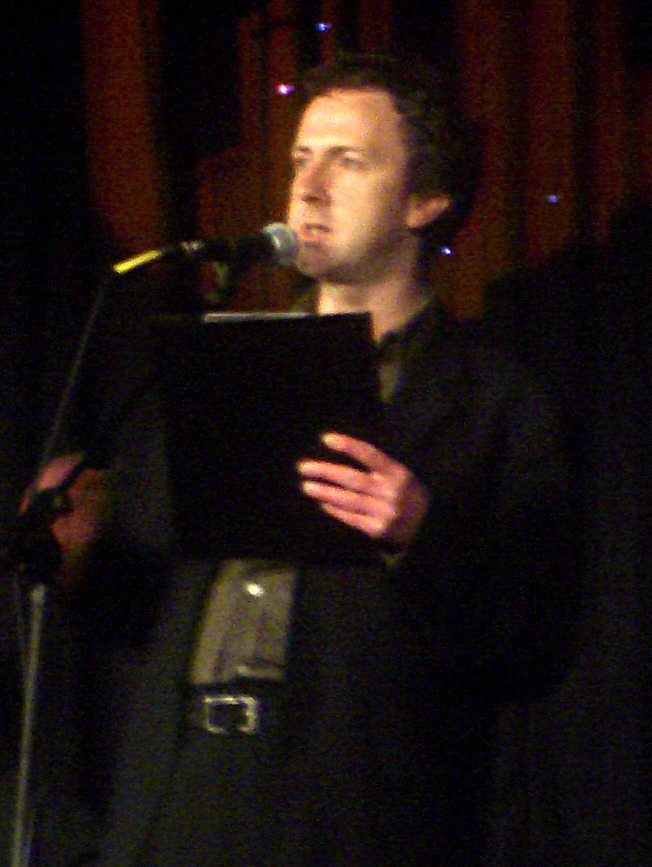
- Punt on The Now Show in 2005
- Born: Stephen Mark Punt; 1961 or 1962 (age 64–65)
- Education: St Catharine's College, Cambridge
- Notable work: The Mary Whitehouse Experience; The Now Show; It's Been a Bad Week

Comedy career
- Medium: Radio, television
- Genre: Political satire
- Subjects: Politics, current events

Stephen Mark Punt (born 15 September 1962) is a British comedy writer, comedian and actor. Along with Hugh Dennis, he is part of the double act Punt and Dennis and was the presenter of BBC Radio 4 satirical news programme The Now Show. He is also a writer and programme associate for various television panel game shows, including Would I Lie to You? and Mock the Week, and is a writer for fellow comedians such as Rory Bremner and Jasper Carrott.

== Early life ==
Punt wanted to be an author as a child, but knew he would never make a living out of it, so he turned to comedy. Punt was educated at Whitgift School and St Catharine's College, Cambridge, where he read English. While at Cambridge, he joined Footlights, where he first met comedy partner Hugh Dennis and was vice-president from 1983 to 1985 with Nick Hancock as president. He was in the writing team for three revues in a row.

== Career ==
While at university Punt began writing for the BBC Radio 4 series Week Ending. Punt and Dennis later became resident guest comedians on shows presented by Jasper Carrott, including Canned Carrott, with Punt contributing to the writing team as well.

In 1988 Punt and Dennis worked with fellow former Footlights member David Baddiel and his comedy partner Rob Newman to write and perform a satirical sketch and stand-up show called The Mary Whitehouse Experience on BBC Radio 1. After three years, the show transferred to television. Punt and Dennis went on to perform in their TV sketch show, The Imaginatively Titled Punt & Dennis Show, and co-wrote and starred with Nick Hancock in the sitcom Me, You and Him.

Punt performed with Dennis in It's Been a Bad Week for BBC Radio 2. The pair were also the main presenters and writers of BBC Radio 4's The Now Show and the writers of Radio 4 sitcom The Party Line. Punt, with Mark Tavener, is co-writer of the 2007 Radio 4 series His Master's Voice. He also, with the help of Hugh Dennis, Jon Holmes, Marcus Brigstocke and Mitch Benn wrote The Now Show Book of World Records, a follow-up book for The Now Show.

Since 2008 Punt has co-created and performed in four stories by Rockford's Rock Opera, a critically acclaimed series of ecological musical stories written with school friend, Matthew Sweetapple. In 2025, the first of Rockford's Rock Opera's stories, Lost on Infinity, was released as an illustrated book.

2008 also saw the first episode of Punt PI, a fact-based comedy radio series on BBC Radio 4 in which Punt investigates mysteries in Britain. The show continued occasionally until 2017, racking up 10 series.

In 2011, Punt became the presenter of Radio 4 quiz show The 3rd Degree. Punt played Eric Idle in the BBC adaptation Holy Flying Circus, covering the controversy surrounding the release of Monty Python's Life of Brian.

On 3 January 2013 Punt appeared on Celebrity Mastermind. His specialist subject was Tony Hancock and his chosen supported charity was The Stillbirth and Neonatal Death Society (Sands). Punt won the contest.

During 2016 Punt toured with the production of The Rocky Horror Show in the role of the narrator.
