= Hugh Dennis =

British comedian and actor (born 1962)

Hugh Dennis FRGS
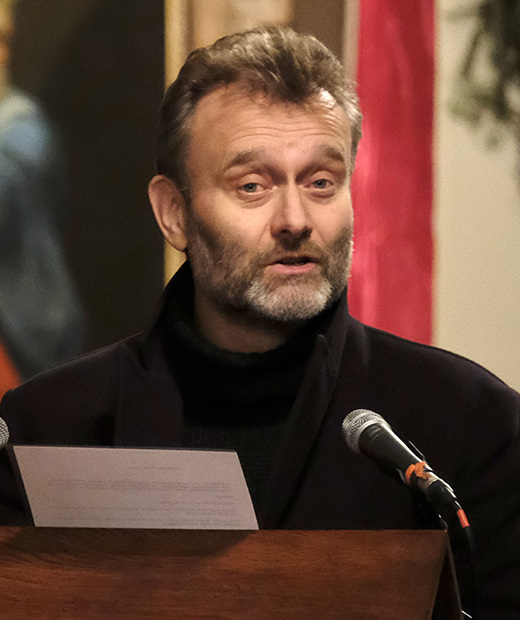
- Dennis in December 2017
- Born: Peter Hugh Dennis; 13 February 1962 (age 64); Kettering, Northamptonshire, England
- Education: University of Cambridge
- Spouses: Miranda Carroll (m. 1987; div. 1993); Kate Abbot-Anderson (m. 1996; div. 2015); Claire Skinner (m. 2022)
- Children: 2
- Parent: John Dennis (father)
- Relatives: John Dennis Jr. (brother)

Comedy career
- Years active: Since 1989
- Genres: Political satire, impressionism, improvisational comedy, insult comedy
- Subjects: British politics, family, current events

Peter Hugh Dennis FRGS (born 13 February 1962) is an English comedian, presenter, actor, impressionist and writer. He was a panellist in every episode of the original run of Mock the Week from 2005 until 2022, and is one half of the double act Punt and Dennis alongside Steve Punt.

Dennis has also played Dr Piers Crispin in the sitcom My Hero (2000–2006), Pete Brockman in the sitcom Outnumbered (2007–2014, 2016, 2024), Toby in the sitcom Not Going Out (2014–2023, 2026), and the Bank Manager in the comedy-drama series Fleabag (2016). He presents the community archaeology television show The Great British Dig (since 2020).

== Early life ==
Peter Hugh Dennis was born in Kettering on 13 February 1962, the son of schoolteacher Dorothy Mary (née Hinnels) and Anglican priest John Dennis. His older brother, John Jr., is a diplomat who has served as the British Ambassador to Angola and the British Representative to Taiwan. He grew up in the Mill Hill suburb of London as his father was appointed vicar of the local John Keble Church soon after his birth. His father later became the Bishop of Knaresborough and then the Bishop of St Edmundsbury and Ipswich.

Dennis was educated at private University College School in London. During his time at UCS, he played rugby with Will Self and was head boy in his final year. He went on to read for the Geographical Tripos as an exhibitioner at St John's College, Cambridge. His thesis was titled "The Spatial Distribution of Elementary Education in 19th-century Wakefield". He also joined the Footlights, where he first met Steve Punt and club president Nick Hancock, and the trio collaborated on a number of projects besides the annual revue. In 2016, Dennis said that he was approached by MI5 agents whilst at Cambridge University and attended a preliminary interview to join them; he decided that he did not want to take the option any further, particularly after being told during the interview that the job would require him to "do people over".

After graduating with a first class honours degree, Dennis worked for Unilever for six years in the marketing department while performing comedy with Punt at venues including The Comedy Store in London at weekends. Whilst at Unilever, Dennis became a brand manager of Lynx deodorant. His time at Unilever came to an end when he and Punt had their BBC Radio 1 show The Mary Whitehouse Experience, which they had created alongside David Baddiel and Rob Newman, commissioned for BBC Two. Dennis was put on sabbatical by Unilever, as rehearsals for the show were to take place on a weekday, but he never returned to the company and instead chose to pursue comedy full-time as a result of the show's success.

Dennis uses his middle name Hugh as his stage name because the actor Peter Dennis was already a member of the performing arts union Equity.

== Career ==
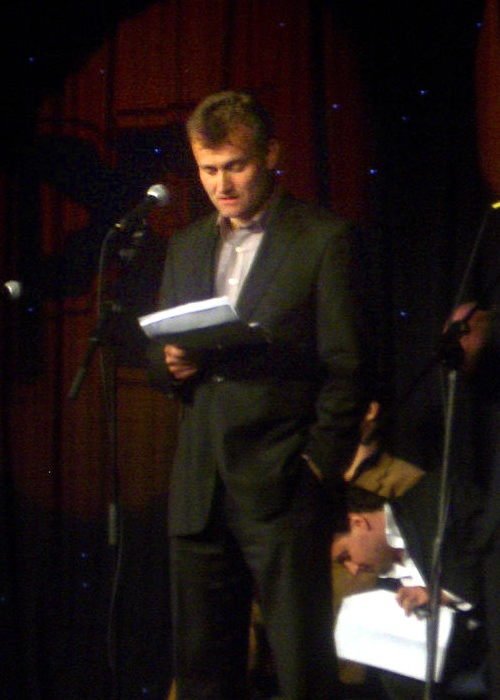
Dennis during a recording of The Now Show, 2005

As an impressionist, Dennis did voices for Spitting Image and appeared with Punt as resident support comics on two TV series hosted on the BBC by Jasper Carrott. He has also provided voiceover for several adverts, including Tango's controversial 1991 advertisement Orange Man.

Dennis also appeared twice as a contestant on the topical panel show Have I Got News for You, including one opposite former schoolmate Self. Punt and Dennis's radio career includes over a decade of performing Punt and Dennis, It's Been a Bad Week, The Party Line and the satirical radio comedy show, The Now Show. On The Now Show, Dennis was originally in a line-up including Punt, Mitch Benn, Laura Shavin, Jon Holmes and Marcus Brigstocke. He is friends with Chris Morris and has had cameos on Brass Eye as well as doing the narration for the CBBC show Sam and Mark's Guide to Dodging Disaster.

In December 2009, Dennis joined Oz Clarke in presenting the 60-minute Christmas special Oz and Hugh Drink to Christmas broadcast on BBC Two. In December 2010 the pair returned for a four-part series called Oz and Hugh Raise the Bar, which puts them in a competition to create a bar featuring only local British food and drinks.

Dennis has starred in a number of sitcoms, including My Hero, in which he played obnoxious GP Piers Crispin. From 2007 to 2014, he starred in Outnumbered, a semi-improvised sitcom based around family life and won a BAFTA nomination in the comedy category for the 2009 Christmas special. On Radio 4 he also featured in the sitcom Revolting People which, like Outnumbered, was co-written by Andy Hamilton.

Besides his regular television work, Dennis was a panellist on Mock the Week and appeared in every episode of its original BBC run between 2005 and 2022, with the exception of a special episode of the programme that was broadcast as part of David Walliams' 24 Hour Panel People. He is a regular guest on various BBC-broadcast comedy panel game shows such as They Think It's All Over, Would I Lie To You?, QI and has guest hosted Have I Got News for You. In 2011, Dennis hosted the short-lived improvisational comedy series Fast and Loose.

Beginning on 16 February 2012, Dennis and Julia Bradbury hosted a four-part BBC One documentary series The Great British Countryside. From October 2014 to December 2023, Dennis played Toby in the long-running sitcom Not Going Out; he is due to make a guest return to the role in 2026.

In 2016, Dennis appeared as the Bank Manager in the BBC Three series Fleabag, acting alongside Phoebe Waller-Bridge in the first, fourth, and final episodes of series 1.

In February 2021, Dennis started presenting The Great British Dig on More 4.

In the 2021 Bond film No Time to Die, Dennis cameoed as scientist Dr Hardy in an MI6 laboratory.

== Personal life ==
Dennis lives in London, having previously resided near Chichester. He married Miranda Carroll in 1987 but they divorced in 1993. He married Catherine Abbot-Anderson in 1996, and they had a son and a daughter before divorcing in 2015. In June 2018 it was confirmed he was in a relationship with his Outnumbered co-star Claire Skinner. In 2025 it was revealed the couple had married in 2022.

Dennis is a fellow of the Royal Geographical Society and in 2008 he received an Honorary fellowship from the University of Northampton. In 2024 he became the Chancellor of the University of Winchester.

In 2007 he took part in the L'Étape du Tour, cycling an open stage of the Tour de France for amateurs which was held in the mountains two weeks before the main event, completing it in 11 hours and 7 minutes. In 2011 he completed the Great South Run in Portsmouth, for the Alzheimer's Society. He is a supporter of Arsenal FC.

== Filmography ==
Year	Show	Role	Notes
1989–1991	Spitting Image	Various characters	Voice only
1991–1992	The Mary Whitehouse Experience	Various characters	Co-creator/writer
1992	Me, You and Him	Harry Dunstan	Co-creator
1992	A Word in Your Era	Prince John	1 episode
1992	Springing Lenin	Peter	TV short
1994	The Easter Stories	Gardener	1 episode
1994–1995	The Imaginatively Titled Punt & Dennis Show	Various characters	12 episodes
1996	The Detectives	Seth	1 episode
1997	Brass Eye	Dr. Balb Kubrox	1 episode
2000	Doctors	Nick Browning	1 episode
2000	Jack Dee's Happy Hour	Jed Cake	Voice only; 8 episodes
2000–2006	My Hero	Dr. Piers Crispin	51 episodes
2002	TV to Go	Various characters	Series 2
2005–2022, 2026	Mock the Week	Himself, regular panellist (BBC series), recurring panelist (TLC series)	
2007–2014, 2016, 2024	Outnumbered	Pete Brockman	Series regular
2009	New Tricks	Tony Granville	1 episode
2009	Hotel Babylon	Jim Doody	1 episode
2009, 2010	QI	Himself, guest panellist	2 episodes
2011	Fast and Loose	Himself	Host
2013	Agatha Christie's Marple	Major Phillpot	"Endless Night"
2014–present	Over to Bill	Bill Onion	
2014–2023, 2026	Not Going Out	Toby	Also voiced Captain Morris in 1 episode
2015	Ballot Monkeys	Martin Frost	
2016	Drunk History	Napoleon / Richard III	2 episodes
2016	Midsomer Murders	Milo Craven	Episode 19.1 "The Village That Rose from the Dead"
2016	Britain's Classroom Heroes	Presenter	
2016, 2017	Insert Name Here	Guest panellist	2 episodes
2016–2019	Fleabag	Bank Manager	4 episodes
2017	The Red Nose African Convoy	Himself	One-off special
2017	Taskmaster	Contestant	8 episodes
2017	The Zoo	Narrator	15 episodes
2017	Possibly... The Best Adverts in the World	Presenter	One-off special
2018	Richard Osman's House of Games	Contestant	5 episodes (won)
2018	Trollied	Jerome	1 episode
2018	Nativity Rocks!	Liam Hargreaves	
2019	Urban Myths	Richard Asher	1 episode
2019	Yorkshire Airport	Narrator	6 episodes
2020	McDonald & Dodds	George Holden	
2020	The Great British Dig	Presenter	Pilot
2021	No Time to Die	Dr. Hardy	
2021–2023	The Great British Dig: History in Your Back Garden	Presenter	
2022	Huge Homes with Hugh Dennis	Presenter	
2022	Murder, They Hope	Aaron	Episode: "Can't See the Blood for the Trees"
2023	The Festive Pottery Throw Down	Contestant	Winner
2023–2025	The Couple Next Door	Alan Richardson	Series 1 & 2
2024	Pointless	Guest co-presenter	
2025	Two Men on a Bike	Himself	With David Baddiel
2025	Beyond Paradise	Arthur Donelan	Series 3

== Accolades ==
Year	Award	Category	Nominated work	Result	Ref.
1994	Writers' Guild of Great Britain Awards	Light Entertainment	Canned Carrott	Won	
2010	BAFTA TV Awards	Best Male Comedy Performance	Outnumbered: The Christmas Special	Nominated	
2011	British Comedy Awards	Best TV Comedy Actor	Outnumbered	Nominated	
