= Black Books =

British TV sitcom (2000–2004)

- Title screen featuring the front of Black Books
- Genre: Sitcom; Surreal comedy
- Created by: Dylan Moran; Graham Linehan
- Written by: Dylan Moran; Kevin Cecil; Andy Riley; Graham Linehan; Arthur Mathews
- Starring: Dylan Moran; Bill Bailey; Tamsin Greig
- Composer: Jonathan Whitehead
- Country of origin: United Kingdom
- Original language: English
- No. of series: 3
- No. of episodes: 18

Production
- Executive producer: William Burdett-Coutts
- Producers: Nira Park; Julian Meers
- Editor: Paul Machliss; Nick Ames
- Camera setup: Multi-camera
- Running time: 25 minutes
- Production company: Big Talk

Original release
- Network: Channel 4
- Release: 29 September 2000 – 15 April 2004

Black Books is a British sitcom created by Dylan Moran and Graham Linehan, and written by Moran, Kevin Cecil, Andy Riley, Linehan and Arthur Mathews. It was broadcast on Channel 4, running for three series from 2000 to 2004. Starring Dylan Moran as Bernard Black, Bill Bailey as Manny Bianco, and Tamsin Greig as Fran Katzenjammer, the series is set in the eponymous London bookshop and follows the lives of its owner, his assistant, and their friend. The series was produced by Big Talk Productions, in association with Channel 4.

The show was produced in a multiple-camera setup, and was primarily filmed at Teddington Studios in Teddington, London, with exterior scenes filmed on location on Leigh Street and the surrounding areas in Bloomsbury, London. Three series were made, with the first episode broadcast on 29 September 2000 and the last on 15 April 2004.

Black Books was a critical success, winning awards, including two BAFTAs (for Best Situation Comedy in 2001 and 2005) and a Bronze Rose at the Festival Rose d'Or.

== Synopsis ==
Bernard Black is the owner of Black Books, a small London bookshop. The series revolves around the lives of Bernard, Manny and Fran. Bernard's persona of a grouchy and misanthropic shopkeeper is a central theme; he has a hatred of the outside world and all the people who inhabit it, except for his best friend, Fran, who initially runs a trendy bric-a-brac shop, Nifty Gifty, next door to the bookshop.

Bernard displays little interest or knowledge in retail (or, indeed, anything outside drinking, smoking and reading) and actively avoids having to interact with anyone, even inside his shop. He would often rather pass up on a sale than have to engage in human interaction to make one.

Manny is introduced in the first episode as an angst-ridden accountant who enters the bookshop seeking The Little Book of Calm. During a drunken night out, Bernard offers him a job as a shop assistant and a room above the shop if he will do Bernard's accounts for him. Sobering up, Bernard realises Manny's optimistic nature is not suited to this "kind of operation". Fran, however, seeing that Manny is good for Bernard, forces Bernard to let him stay.

== Cast ==
The series revolves around the three main characters of Bernard Ludwig Black (Dylan Moran), Manny Bianco (Bill Bailey) and Fran Katzenjammer (Tamsin Greig), who all appear in every episode. Other characters appear briefly in single episodes, while the show also featured several guest stars such as Keith Allen, Rob Brydon, Annette Crosbie, Lucy Davis, Olivia Colman and Peter Serafinowicz.

== Production ==
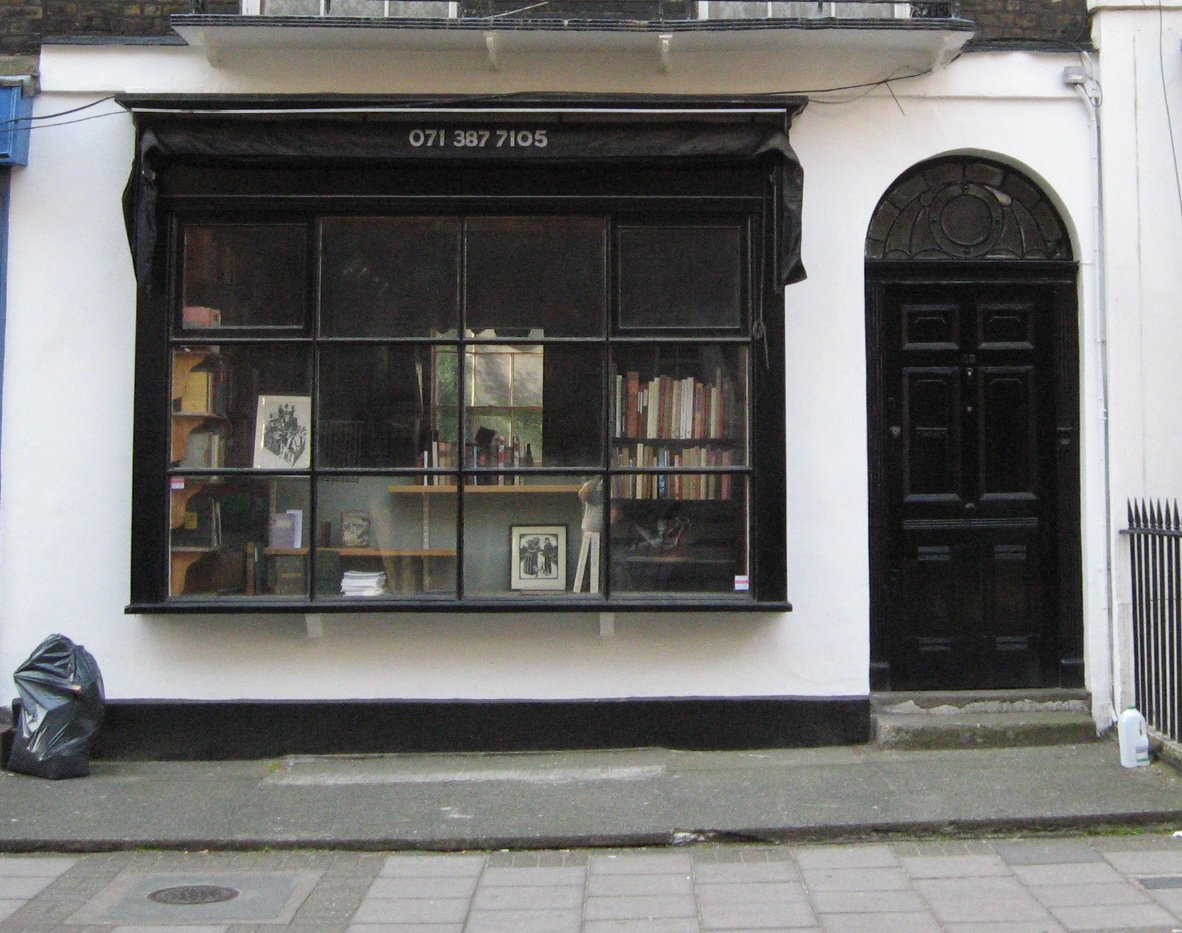
Collinge & Clark bookshop, used for exterior shots in the series

A pilot for the show was featured in the 1998 Channel 4 sitcom festival in Riverside Studios. This early version was decidedly darker, revolving around Bernard's, and later Manny's, decision to commit suicide. It featured Manny (surname Zimmerman in reference to Bob Dylan) and the Fran character as Valerie, a philosophy lecturer.

The pilot was an original creation of Moran's and the series was his first creation as a writer for a television series. Linehan, co-writer of the earlier Channel 4 sitcom Father Ted, joined at the outset to co-write the series with Moran at the suggestion of producer William Burdett-Coutts after Linehan saw the pilot and had seen Moran performing in Dublin. The characters were Moran's original creation, created over a month-long process he calls "spitballing", which is talking spontaneously to each other in character.

The concept of Bernard owning a bookshop came about because of Moran's view of bookshops as doomed enterprises. Moran said, "Running a second-hand bookshop is a guaranteed commercial failure. It's a whole philosophy. There were bookshops that I frequented and I was always struck by the loneliness and doggedness of these men who piloted this death ship", while Linehan said his belligerent personality reflected a sign he once saw in a bookshop stating "Please put the books anywhere you like because we've got nothing better to do than put them back". Moran said of the series, "We just wanted to cram as much elaborate stupidity into a half-hour that could make it be coherent and that you would believe".

The fictional address for the bookshop is Black Books, 13 Little Bevan Street, Bloomsbury, London WC1. Manny also states the shop is located "just off Russell Square". The exterior scenes of the bookshop were filmed outside a real bookshop, albeit a smaller one, called Collinge & Clark, located at 13 Leigh Street, Bloomsbury.

The audio commentary for Shaun of the Dead states that Black Books is considered by the producers to be a sister show of the 1999 Channel 4 sitcom Spaced, also produced by Nira Park. The show features several actors from Spaced:

- Simon Pegg played Bill Bailey's boss in an inversion of their roles in Spaced;
- Nick Frost appeared at the beginning of the episode "The Big Lockout" to install a new security system for the shop, although he lost Manny's attention when he spotted a Subbuteo player in his hair;
- Kevin Cecil, one of the Black Books writers, appeared in Spaced playing the leader of "Robot Club";
- Jessica Stevenson made an appearance as a friend of Fran who was trying to help her live a healthier lifestyle, with attempts to change her diet and get her to exercise more;
- Peter Serafinowicz played a radio broadcaster whose dulcet tones reading the shipping forecast drove Fran wild with desire;
- Omid Djalili appeared in "He's Leaving Home" as an opportunistic photographer;
- Rob Brydon appeared in series 2's episode "The Fixer".

In one episode Manny is heard speaking to Twist Morgan, a character from Spaced.

== Episodes ==
=== Original unaired pilot ===
Title	Original release date
"Pilot Episode"	Unaired
The show's pilot was decidedly darker, revolving around Bernard's, and later Manny's, decision to commit suicide. It featured Manny (surname Zimmerman in reference to Bob Dylan) as a professional depression-o-gram, and the Fran character as Valerie, a philosophy lecturer. To date it remains unreleased in mainstream media.

=== Series 1 (2000) ===
No.	Title	Directed by	Written by	Original release date
1	"Cooking the Books"	Graham Linehan & Nick Wood	Dylan Moran & Graham Linehan	29 September 2000
After his accountant flees from the police, Bernard, the slovenly owner of Black Books, is faced with the prospect of doing his own taxes, resorting to pairing his socks, getting drunk with door-to-door evangelists, and trying to seriously injure himself to avoid it. Manny, a high-strung accountant, enters Black Books to buy The Little Book of Calm on his way to work and later swallows it; it disappears before his operation, his baffled doctor musing that it may have been assimilated into Manny's system. Bernard's only friend, Fran, who owns the knick-knack shop "Nifty Gifty" next door, is distracted from being on-call as a friend's birth coach by a sphere of unknown function. Bernard is knocked unconscious by skinheads, and Manny offers to do his taxes. Guest stars Martin Freeman as Manny's doctor, Dominic Carter as a skinhead and Rupert Vansittart as the tasteful customer.
2	"Manny's First Day"	Graham Linehan & Nick Wood	Dylan Moran & Graham Linehan	6 October 2000
Bernard wakes up after a night of drinking to discover he has accidentally given Manny a job at the bookshop, and spends the day trying to get rid of him. Manny proves to be a charming, sociable and competent employee. An offering of wine from Manny and the threat of physical violence from Fran persuade Bernard to keep Manny on board. Guest stars David Cann as the roaring customer, co-writer Graham Linehan as the "I Love Books" customer, and Rhys Thomas as a student.
3	"Grapes of Wrath"	Graham Linehan & Nick Wood	Dylan Moran & Graham Linehan	13 October 2000
When the squalor of the bookshop overwhelms him, Manny calls a creepy cleaner, and Bernard reluctantly agrees to house-sit for a friend. Unfortunately, the two manage to drink a very expensive bottle of wine that was due to be presented to the Pope, and have to figure out a way to replace it. Meanwhile, Fran goes on a date with a man whom she soon realises is closeted. She then dates the cleaner. Guest star: The actor Kevin Eldon as the cleaner.
4	"The Blackout"	Graham Linehan & Nick Wood	Dylan Moran & Graham Linehan	20 October 2000
After celebrating his birthday fueling an all-night The Sweeney marathon by drinking espresso, Manny thinks he is a 1970s policeman and manages to go from eyeing old men suspiciously in the bookshop to being trapped at the local police station helping a real detective put the 'good cop, bad cop' routine on a local villain. Bernard explains how going to a dinner party led to him falling and breaking his arm. Fran describes the steps from seeing her boyfriend having dinner with another woman (wrongly assuming him to be cheating) to being in hospital with a neck injury. The woman is his sister and he ends his relationship with Fran. Guest stars Colin McFarlane as the detective.
5	"The Big Lock-Out"	Graham Linehan & Nick Wood	Dylan Moran & Graham Linehan	27 October 2000
After being burgled, Black Books gets a new alarm and security door fitted, but Manny fails to listen to the unlock code, distracted by a Subbuteo player in the installer's hair. This results in Manny being trapped alone inside with only a bottle of absinthe and dead bees for company and Bernard locked outside with just enough money for popcorn and a cinema ticket. Meanwhile, Fran has taken the phone off the hook to listen to silky-voiced Howell Granger read the shipping forecast on the radio, leaving Bernard to wander the streets of London penniless, cold and wet. Guest stars: Nick Frost as the alarm installer, Peter Serafinowicz as Howell Granger, writer Graham Linehan as a fast-food customer, and Tony Way as the fast-food chain and cinema employee.
6	"He's Leaving Home"	Graham Linehan & Nick Wood	Dylan Moran & Graham Linehan	3 November 2000
Bernard's constant bullying drives Manny to leave. He is attacked by a bee in a telephone box and finds himself on the streets. He is picked up by a photographer and treated to a glamorous life of expensive clothes, satin sheets and crinkle-cut chips in silver bowls, but returns to the book shop after discovering that the photographer has a beard fetish. Guest stars: Omid Djalili as Trebor the photographer, and David Walliams as a customer.

=== Series 2 (2002) ===
No.	Title	Directed by	Written by	Original release date
7	"The Entertainer"	Martin Dennis	Dylan Moran	1 March 2002
Fran decides to learn the piano and enlists the services of an elderly blind Russian tutor. His harsh methods and her inability to master the instrument quickly lead her to quit. Manny discovers he can play the piano purely on instinct, and against all odds Bernard gets a date with an attractive woman. As a result, Fran and Bernard bribe Manny to hide inside the piano, armed with only spoons, in an attempt to make themselves look good. Guest star: Nina Conti as Bernard's date.
8	"Fever"	Martin Dennis	Dylan Moran, Kevin Cecil & Andy Riley	8 March 2002
A heat wave sweeps London, causing Bernard to seek a "summer girlfriend", Fran to suffer from insomnia, and Manny to panic about his "Dave's syndrome", a condition that supposedly triggers at 88°F (31°C). Bernard tries to get Manny as hot as possible. Fran discovers the walls of her flat are literally closing in as her unscrupulous landlord creates another flat from the stolen space. Bernard pretends to be her lawyer in an attempt to rectify the situation but quickly falls for the new lodger, Alice. At the end of this episode, Bernard asks Fran when they will admit they are deeply attracted to each other. Fran will not 'Until at least one of us is dead'. The scene returns to Manny's condition having been triggered with disastrous consequences. Guest starring Johnny Vegas as Fran's landlord and Rose Keegan as Alice.
9	"The Fixer"	Martin Dennis	Dylan Moran & Arthur Mathews	15 March 2002
While Fran is in desperate need of a job, Manny gets a call from old friend Gus, a diminutive underworld capo. Gus agrees to get Fran a job working for a man named Nugent in exchange for the bookstore hosting a reading of his nephew Danny's new book. Danny is illiterate, and his ghostwritten autobiography describes the pain he has inflicted on many others in great detail. He threatens Bernard and Manny until they teach him to read within two days so he will be able to record an audio book. Guest stars: Ricky Grover as Danny, Rob Brydon as B. Nugent, and Big Mick as Gus.
10	"Blood"	Martin Dennis	Kevin Cecil, Andy Riley & Dylan Moran	22 March 2002
Fran researches her genealogy and uncovers third cousins from Eastern Europe, but after meeting them, wants them to leave her alone. Meanwhile, Manny and Bernard try to re-invent the shop as a trendy café-bookshop, and then as an upscale restaurant. The shop is overrun by a horde of unseen carnivorous insectoids that Manny and Bernard must make an effort to destroy. Guest starring Mark Donovan as Cousin Gregor and Vincenzo Nicoli as Frederick.
11	"Hello Sun"	Martin Dennis	Dylan Moran	29 March 2002
Fran takes up Yoga with Eva (Jessica Hynes) and piously lectures everyone about how much better she feels. Meanwhile, Bernard discovers a complete works of Sigmund Freud that Manny bought for £60 and begins tormenting Manny by diagnosing his various personality disorders. Manny gains the regal-like confidence to finally stand up to Bernard.
12	"A Nice Change"	Martin Dennis	Dylan Moran	5 April 2002
When around-the-clock building commences next door, Bernard, Manny and Fran decide to go on holiday. Manny wants adventure, Fran wants relaxation, and Bernard just wants somewhere exactly like the bookshop.

=== Series 3 (2004) ===
No.	Title	Directed by	Written by	Original release date
13	"Manny Come Home"	David McCarthy	Kevin Cecil, Andy Riley & Dylan Moran	11 March 2004
Fran returns from a holiday in Cornwall to find Bernard living amongst mouldy books and dead badgers and Manny working next door at the glossy Goliath Books. Manny is out of place amongst creepy micromanager Evan and his staff, but resists Fran's self-serving attempts to drag him back to Bernard so that she has somewhere to hang out. Bernard's physical condition deteriorates rapidly without Manny's care. Guest star: Simon Pegg as Evan.
14	"Elephants and Hens"	Martin Dennis	Dylan Moran, Kevin Cecil & Andy Riley	18 March 2004
Fran leaves for the weekend to go to her friend Becky's hen party while Bernard and Manny, inspired by their latest children's-book event, decide to write and illustrate a book for children. Bernard's first effort comes to over 1,030 pages, and covers Joseph Stalin, a lens grinder, a broken marriage, and a truth-seeking journalist. Meanwhile, Fran's hen party is a disaster. Guest stars: Lucy Davis as Becky, Olivia Colman as Tanya, Charlie Hicks as Timmy, and Oliver Golding as Young Customer.
15	"Moo-Ma and Moo-Pa"	Martin Dennis	Dylan Moran, Kevin Cecil & Andy Riley	25 March 2004
Manny's irritating parents unexpectedly come to stay after Bernard deletes Manny's answerphone messages. Bernard is infuriated by their quirks and songs, and it is revealed that Manny's letters home have greatly embellished his actual accomplishments in life. Guest stars: Annette Crosbie as Moo-Ma, Sam Kelly as Moo-Pa, and Nick Frost as an answerphone voice.
16	"A Little Flutter"	Martin Dennis	Dylan Moran, Kevin Cecil & Andy Riley	1 April 2004
After a small win on the Grand National, Bernard becomes addicted to gambling, leaving Fran and Manny in a bitter competition to sell as many books as possible. Soon horses are not enough and Bernard joins an illegal poker game against a group of ruthless, successful gamblers, including Dave 'Mouse Ear' Smith. Being hopeless at cards, Bernard (now nicknamed The Gold Mine) loses everything, and Fran and Manny need to hatch a plan to obtain the money before Bernard's debtors seek payment. Guest stars: Keith Allen as 'Mouse Ears' Smith and Craig Parkinson as Martin the Tout.
17	"Travel Writer"	Martin Dennis	Kevin Cecil, Andy Riley & Dylan Moran	8 April 2004
Manny organises a book launch party at the shop with charismatic but smug travel writer Jason, and everyone starts falling for him and his stories of far-away adventure. Meanwhile, Bernard's landlord has died and a small cat now owns the building. Driven to destroy the cat's burgeoning real-estate empire, he attempts to persuade an animal-loving pest exterminator to kill it. His attempts fail and cause the exterminator to commit suicide. When Bernard tries to finish the job, Manny is injured. Guest starring Julian Rhind-Tutt as Jason, Alice Lowe as Solicitor and Catherine Shepherd as Bridget.
18	"Party"	Martin Dennis	Kevin Cecil, Andy Riley & Dylan Moran	15 April 2004
On a slow night, Manny suggests that the gang go to a party which will be attended by Rowena, a girl he likes. Instantly jealous, Bernard overcomes his natural reluctance with curiosity to see what kind of woman could find Manny attractive. Manny arms himself with an array of items to strategically leave about the house to give him an excuse to call her. Bernard discovers that his ex-fiancee faked her own death to escape from their relationship.

== Awards and reception ==
Black Books won the BAFTA for Best Situation Comedy in 2001 and 2005, and won a Bronze Rose at the Festival Rose d'Or of Montreux in 2001. It also received nominations for British Comedy Awards and the Irish Film and Television Awards.

According to Allan Brown, writing for The Times in August 2005, the show was "killed off after three hugely popular series".

In Channel 4's "The World's Greatest Comedy Characters" poll, Bernard was voted 19th. The show ranked 58th out of 100 in the BBC's Britain's Best Sitcom poll in 2004.

== Legacy ==
When asked by Digital Spy in 2015 about the show possibly returning, Moran replied saying, "No, no, no, no! No! Does that answer the question, no!" and stated that he would rather focus on new projects. He also said that he would never do another studio sitcom again.
