= Luxury (Fantastic Plastic Machine album) =

Studio album by Fantastic Plastic Machine
- Released: September 10, 1998
- Recorded: 1997–1998
- Genre: Shibuya-kei; sampledelia; house; downtempo; big beat; electronica
- Length: 55:32
- Label: Readymade
- Producer: Tomoyuki Tanaka; Masaki Tsurugi

Fantastic Plastic Machine chronology
Summer Review EP (1998)	Luxury (1998)	Beautiful (2001)

Luxury is the second studio album by Japanese musician Fantastic Plastic Machine. It was released on September 10, 1998, by Readymade Records. The album was released in Germany on March 29, 1999, by Bungalow Records and in the United States on April 27, 1999, by Emperor Norton Records.

Luxury is a continuation of Fantastic Plastic Machine's previous work in Shibuya-kei, though in some tracks there are indications of a shift towards house music with 1960s northern soul and 1970s Philadelphia soul influences, a path he explored more on his next album Beautiful. Luxury features guest vocals from Lorraine Bowen, Simon Fisher Turner, and Yukari Fresh, among others.

== Critical reception ==
Professional ratings
Review scores
Source	Rating
AllMusic	4/5 stars
Alternative Press	3/5
Pitchfork	7.1/10
PopMatters	7.3/10
The Times	8/10
Uncut	4/5 stars

Sarah Zupko of PopMatters wrote, "Luxury revels in international, otherworldly sounds and collaborations with musicians who perfectly suit Tanaka's experimental bent." She called the album "an enjoyable, eclectic effort that fans of sophisticated Euro pop are sure to adore." In 2020, Tokyo Weekender writer Ed Cunningham wrote that Luxury was "more refined" than Fantastic Plastic Machine's self-titled debut, "but both were inventive, slightly surreal and utterly smooth pieces of dancefloor-worthy retro pop."

== Track listing ==
No.	Title	Lyrics	Music	Length
1.	"Theme of Luxury"		Tomoyuki Tanaka; Masanori Ikeda	1:05
2.	"There Must Be an Angel (Playing with My Heart) (Mix for Mirror Ball)"	Annie Lennox; Dave Stewart	Lennox; Stewart	9:17
3.	"Honolulu, Calcutta"	Tanaka	Tanaka	5:34
4.	"Electric Lady Land" (English version)	Momoko Suzuki	Tanaka; Masaki Tsurugi	4:18
5.	"He Became a Beatnik"		Tanaka	1:14
6.	"Bossa for Jackie (Dedicated to Mrs. Kennedy)"	Simon Fisher Turner	Tanaka; Tsurugi; Turner	3:38
7.	"You Must Learn All Night Long"	Tanaka	Tanaka	6:20
8.	"Lotto"	Andreas Dorau	Tanaka; Tsurugi	5:25
9.	"Satellite Beats"		Tanaka	1:06
10.	"I've Forgotten My Fagotto"		Tanaka; Tsurugi	2:54
11.	"The Girl Next Door" (titled "The Girl Next Green Door" on German and US editions)		Tanaka	5:13
12.	"MPF (Mezzo Pianoforte)"		Tanaka; Tsurugi	3:19
13.	"Mr. Fantasy's Love"	Tanaka	Tanaka; Tsurugi	6:09
Total length:				55:32

German edition bonus track
No.	Title	Lyrics	Music	Length
2.	"There Must Be an Angel" (radio edit)	Lennox; Stewart	Lennox; Stewart	3:58
Total length:				59:30

US edition bonus tracks
No.	Title	Lyrics	Music	Length
14.	"Electric Lady Land" (Japanese version)	Tanaka	Tanaka; Tsurugi	4:21
15.	"Bossa for Jackie" (Summer Review EP version)		Tanaka; Tsurugi	3:43
Total length:				63:36

Notes

- On the German edition, the radio edit of "There Must Be an Angel" appears as track two, while the "Mix for Mirror Ball" version appears as track 14.
