= Fantastic Plastic Machine (musician) =

Japanese musician and DJ

- Japanese recording artist Tomoyuki Tanaka, aka Fantastic Plastic Machine with Seth Timbs

Background information
- Born: Tomoyuki Tanaka (田中知之); 6 July 1966 (age 60)
- Origin: Kyoto, Japan
- Genres: Big beat; electronic; trip hop; house; shibuya-kei
- Occupations: Musician, DJ
- Years active: 1988–present
- Labels: Nippon Columbia (1997–2000); Avex Trax (2001); Cutting Edge (2001–present); L'Appareil-Photo (2001–present, vinyl)
- Website: FPMNet.com

Fantastic Plastic Machine is the stage name of Tomoyuki Tanaka (田中知之, Tanaka Tomoyuki; born 6 July 1966), a Japanese musician and DJ born in Kyoto, Japan. Tanaka was part of the Shibuya-kei movement.

== History ==
In the late 1980s, Tanaka played as the bassist in a rock band called Margarine Strikes Back. Then in the early 1990s, Tanaka became a regular club DJ in the Kansai area, working as part of a DJ team known as Sound Impossible. While playing with Sound Impossible, his friend Towa Tei convinced Tanaka to return to recording music, and in 1997 Tanaka created his solo project Fantastic Plastic Machine under the Readymade Records (a Columbia Music Entertainment sub-label) label in Japan.

His 1997 self-titled debut album was described by Stevie Huey as a "bright, bubbly pop confection that reconfigures classic pop and cocktail lounge idioms for the '90s dancefloor." His following album Luxury (1998) "[explores] more down-tempo territory and [concentrates] more on creating texture with his mixes". These albums would go on to give him international recognition. The albums were distributed in the United States under the Emperor Norton label, and in Europe on the Bungalow label. In Japan, he is currently on the Cutting Edge label.

Tanaka hosted a pop culture show on national radio, and in 2004 he hosted another radio show called Sound Concierge. He also once served as the editor for the Japanese fashion magazine Brutus.

Tanaka's song "Electric Lady Land" is featured on the movie soundtrack of The Girl Next Door. He has also been featured on some of DJ Stephane Pompougnac's Hôtel Costes CD series. His song "Bachelor Pad (f.p.m. edit)" was featured on the Austin Powers: The Spy Who Shagged Me soundtrack. A short edit of his song "Beautiful Days" is featured on the Japanese music game beatmania IIDX 6th Style. Also, "Theme of Luxury", "S'Il Vous Plait" and "There Must Be an Angel" (the last song features Lorraine Bowen) are heard in the British sitcom Spaced as well as on the accompanying soundtrack CD. In 2003, his song "Different Colors" was featured in a Louis Vuitton commercial created by superflat artist Takashi Murakami. The commercial featured a panda that eats a girl and her cell phone; the three are then transported into an ethereal Louis Vuitton world. The commercial played in Louis Vuitton stores in Japan.

Tanaka has been involved in Ravex, a collaboration with fellow Avex DJs Shinichi Osawa and Taku Takahashi established to mark 20 years of the label. Their debut album Trax was released on 8 April 2009, and follows the release of the singles I Rave U and Believe in Love - feat BoA.

== Discography ==
=== Albums ===
- The Fantastic Plastic Machine (1997)
- Luxury (1998)
- beautiful. (2001)
- too (2003)
- imaginations (2006)
- FPM (2009)
- QLASSIX (2011)
- Scale (2013)

=== Singles and EPs ===
- "L'aventure Fantastique" (1997)
- Summer Review EP (1998)
- "There Must Be an Angel" (1999)
- "Take Me to the Disco" (1999)
- "Why Not?" (2002)

=== Compilations and remixes ===
- International Standard FPM Luxury Remixes [F] (1999)
- International Standard FPM Luxury Remixes [P] (1999)
- International Standard FPM Luxury Remixes [M] (1999)
- Style #09/Dancing at the Disco at the End of the World (1999)
- Very Best of FPM in the Mix (mixed by Tatsuo Sunaga) (2000)
- Contact (2001)
- Les Plus (2001)
- Space Program (2001)
- Why Not? (2002)
- Zoo (2003)
- Sound Concierge #401 Do Not Disturb (2004)
- Sound Concierge #402 Four Kicks Adventure (2004)
- M-Flo Inside (2004) Track: "Spectacular"
- Sound Concierge #403 Air Conditioning (2004)
- Sound Concierge #404 Electric Carnival (2004)
- Dimension Mix: A Tribute to Bruce Haack (2005) Track: "I'm Bruce"
- Sound Concierge #501 Blanket (2005)
- Sound Concierge #502 Tell Me for Your Delightful Moment (2005)
- Sound Concierge Annex Contemporary Love Songs (2005)
- FPMB: Fantastic Plastic Machine Best (2007)
- Sound Concierge #701 Super Romantic for your moments in love (2007)
- Sound Concierge #702 Electric Heaven for hyper discothèque (2007)
- Sound Concierge Japan "Japanese Lyric Dance" (2008)
- Sound Concierge x Numero TOKYO -Utopia- (2008)
- Ravex Trax (2008)
- House☆Disney (2009)
- Versus. Japanese Rock vs. FPM (2010)
- Qlassix (2011) - Tanaka collaborated with clothing label Uniqlo, providing music for a flash web clock that displays Uniqlo's fashion lines and a calendar, which displays tilt-shifted videos from different locations in Japan.
