= Paul Wilson =

Paul Wilson may refer to:

== Sports ==
- Paul Wilson (baseball) (born 1973), pitcher in Major League Baseball
- Paul Wilson (cricketer) (born 1972), Australian cricketer and umpire
- Paul Wilson (decathlete), New Zealand decathlete, see national champions decathlon
- Paul Wilson (footballer, born 1950) (1950–2017), Scotland international footballer
- Paul Wilson (footballer, born 1968), English former footballer
- Paul Wilson (footballer, born 1977), English former footballer for Gillingham
- Paul Wilson (Jamaican footballer) (born 1993), Jamaican footballer
- Paul Wilson (pole vaulter) (born 1947), American; former pole vault world record holder
- Paul Wilson (sailor), winner of the 2010 Clifford Day Mallory Cup

== Musicians ==
- Paul Wilson (musician) (born 1978), bassist for the rock band Snow Patrol
- Paul David Wilson (born 1952), American songwriter, composer, conductor, and music producer
- Paul Wilson (music theorist) (born 1947), American music theorist and professor
- Paul Wilson (translator) (born 1941), Canadian translator of Czech writers, guitarist and vocalist, member of The Plastic People of the Universe in 1970–1972
- Paul Wilson, original baritone vocalist from The Flamingos
- Paul Wilson, member of the Absolute (production team) and songwriter

== Others ==
- F. Paul Wilson (born 1946), American science fiction and horror author
- Paul Wilson, Baron Wilson of High Wray (1908–1980), British engineer, Lord Lieutenant, governor of the BBC
- Paul Wilson (criminologist) (born 1941), Australian criminologist
- Paul Wilson (meditation teacher), author of The Little Book of Calm, The Quiet, etc.
- Paul Wilson (nuclear engineer) (born 1971), Professor of nuclear engineering
- Paul Wilson (translator) (born 1941), Canadian translator and writer
- Paul C. Wilson (born 1961), judge of the Supreme Court of Missouri
- Paul Graham Wilson (1928–2024), Australian botanist
- Paul Wilson (special effects) (born 1954), see 52nd Academy Awards
- Paul Wilson (palaeoclimatologist), British climate scientist known for his extensive deep-time palaeoclimate work with the Integrated Ocean Drilling Program

== See also ==
- Paul Willson (born 1945), American actor
