= List of Black Books characters =

The three main characters of Black Books. Left to right: Manny Bianco (Bill Bailey), Fran Katzenjammer (Tamsin Greig), and Bernard Black (Dylan Moran).

Black Books is a BAFTA Award winning sitcom first broadcast on Channel 4 from 2000 to 2004. It revolves around the lives of three main characters: Bernard Black, played by Dylan Moran; Manny Bianco, played by Bill Bailey; and Fran Katzenjammer, played by Tamsin Greig. Bernard is the belligerent owner of the book shop Black Books, while Manny is his assistant, and Fran is their friend and neighbour. All three characters appeared in all 18 episodes of the show. Supporting characters appeared infrequently to support each episode's storyline, a number of whom were guest stars, as well as lesser known actors who went on to have major roles in British comedy series. Co-writer Graham Linehan also appeared in Ep. 1.2 as the "I Love Books" customer and Ep 1.5 as a fast food customer.

== Main characters ==
=== Bernard Black ===
Bernard Ludwig Black, played by comedian Dylan Moran, is a bookseller and owner of the Black Books bookshop, wherein much of the series takes place. Many episodes of the series focus on Black along with his eccentric personality and opinions. His distinctive physical traits are his tousled, unkempt hair and black clothing. He is portrayed as being a heavy smoker, so heavy, in fact, that he might have no sense of taste (in the episode "Grapes of Wrath" he eats a coaster, believing it is "some sort of delicious biscuit").

==== Personality ====
Bernard Black is a grumpy, drunken, cynical, pessimistic, and at times depressive Irish misanthrope, whose sole pursuits in life appear to be drinking, smoking, reading, and insulting people. His assistant Manny implies that Bernard does not have a heart, referring to it as "just a shard of ice". His only other friend Fran, however, has "always seen it as a piece of flint". Bernard's role as the owner of the bookshop 'Black Books' is an interesting vocational choice when one takes into account the fact that he hates both the pressures and responsibilities involved in retail, as well as his customers, with extreme passion. To Bernard, the purchasing of his books is indeed a very bad thing, as it means he will have to take the time to order more from "the place where you order books from for when you want to sell them in your bookshop". This is a process capable of reducing him to genuine despair, and he is willing to pay people to take the second hand books they bring to sell him away from the shop so that he doesn't have to catalogue and sell them again. Despite his disdain of the process of retail, he displays an appreciation for the medium in which he deals – when asked at one point if the binding on a set of the collected works of Charles Dickens is real leather, he counters with "They're real Dickens" – and on numerous occasions displays a fondness for the shop itself, demonstrating a defensive reaction to Manny's suggestions for improvement on his first day at work ("It is a lovely place!") and refusing to leave it for anything further than two minutes' walking distance away,'Party', Black Books episode six, series three, although this could in fact be related to his apparent distaste for anything but the most limited of human contact. However, Bernard has been shown to physically mistreat books, using a cookery book featuring an empty plate on the front cover as a substitute plate when expanding the shop into a restaurant and ripping out the last chapters of a book when a customer tries to buy it for fifty pence under the asking price. Despite his apparent fondness for the shop, he doesn't appear to have much faith in it – such as an instance in one episode, when a customer asked for a certain book, Bernard replied, "How should I know? Go to a proper book shop!". Bernard has even once displayed physical violence toward a customer after he was asked to find a book for the customer. The unfortunate man was forced to his knees and coldly informed, "from where you are now to that corner is our music section", before being savagely kicked and ordered to search. He then inadvertently locks said customer in the shop for 2 weeks while noisy construction is occurring next door, and the customer emerges at the end of Bernard, Manny, and Fran's holiday, happy to have found his book, but driven mad by the noise next door.

This combination of misanthropy and reclusiveness have combined to leave Bernard with questionable abilities of social interaction and personal hygiene. He is frequently found in the same black suit (later revealed to actually be an extremely dirty white suit) and his idea of a stylish haircut is to get Manny to slice off clumps of his messy, overgrown hair (which has edible mushrooms in it) with a bread-knife. Due to his poor hygiene, the bookshop is also often afflicted with bizarre examples of uncleanliness, including its colonisation by an unseen species of furry, beaked vermin apparently unknown to modern science, and a banana-eating creature under his bed that they just call The Thing.

For all his misanthropic qualities and anger, Bernard does possess redeeming and sympathetic characteristics; he is clearly mature and well-read, if ill-disposed to use his intelligence to any great degree. He frequently demonstrates a quick and sarcastic wit, and shows a good psychological understanding of those around him. At one point he even wrote what appeared to be a very complex, intense and lengthy novel, involving such themes as love, betrayal and the Stalinist purges at over one thousand pages long in a very short period of time; however, as the idea was to write a children's novel targeted at three- to six-year-olds, he is persuaded to scrap the initial draft by Manny.

Bernard also knows that he is not a friendly or approachable character, nor a highly eloquent one. In "The Entertainer" episode one, series two, he says to Fran, who has told his latest girlfriend that he's a genius, "You! What did you say to Kate? She thinks I'm the Renaissance! She'll think I've lied! I'll have to go along with all this 'reclusive genius' stuff! She's going to be very upset when she finds out I'm a reclusive wanker!"

==== Relationship with other characters ====
The only two characters with whom Bernard could be said to possess a friendship are Manny Bianco, his shop assistant and flatmate, and Fran Katzenjammer, his best and oldest friend. He has a particularly strange relationship with Manny, frequently abusing and bullying him whilst at the same time displaying a curiously possessive and protective attitude towards him, even to the extent that he refers to Manny as his 'son' on more than one occasion. It is shown that Bernard attempts to isolate Manny from his other friends by screening his phone messages, once destroying a letter informing Manny that he had been accepted into the Open University. When Manny mentions a girl he has a crush on, it is met by Bernard with seething jealousy. Despite treating Manny as little more than a downtrodden slave to be bullied and tormented at will, it is also shown that Bernard is practically incapable of functioning without Manny's presence in the shop; on one occasion that Manny both quits his job at the shop (to work at the bookshop next door) and is kicked out of the flat, the state of the shop is reduced to a disordered mess containing both mouldy books and dead badgers and Bernard – who is reduced to obsessively spying on Manny as he works next door – deteriorates severely in his physical health, apparently clueless as to how to look after himself to the extent where he squirts oven cleaner down his throat with the justification "If you can clean an oven, you can clean me".

His relationship with Fran is much stronger; the two share a very good relationship, largely based on a shared fondness for wine and smoking. The two appear to have a platonic friendship, with little overt indication of romantic interest to each other; however, it is suggested that they did once have a sexual encounter, which Fran forced Bernard to forget. Unlike most, Fran is also capable of confronting and intimidating Bernard. Their relationship is better described as more brother-sister, especially with both attempting to upstage or humiliate the other, yet despite their apparently slightly antagonistic dealings when they aren't collectively ganging up on Manny, both show genuine admiration for each other (Bernard actually gives in on a lie he was trying to convince Fran of about Manny, but when she threatened to leave he immediately backed down and holds her arm to enforce his plea). Despite Bernard professing to not be interested in Fran's romantic life or indeed many other aspects of her life, he does remember various boyfriends from past conversations, and the two give each other advice or reassurance in terms of romance; most of the time this is a sympathetic ear and a mutual conclusion that they are not entirely the guilty party. Fran does try and prevent Bernard hurting himself in pursuit of love, and when this fails, she is quite supportive and patient about the incident (a rare switch as Fran more actively hunts romance whereas Bernard seems to allow it to drift by).

==== Romance and softness ====
Romance is also shown to bring out a gentle, more vulnerable (and even somewhat caring) side to Bernard's personality; he is noticeably shy, awkward and self-deprecating when attempting to charm Kate, a young woman he takes an interest in, and is generous and eager to please when attempting to pursue Alice, a woman on whom he develops a crush during a summer heatwave – this relationship, however, was doomed by both Bernard's over-eager attempts to shower his 'summer girl' with presents and bad poetry, and the fact that Alice wasn't, in fact, interested in him in the first place. In the final episode, Bernard revealed a far more tragic side to his character, telling Manny that he had once had a fiance, Emma, who had died before they could be married, thus explaining much of his negative view towards life, as well as largely cold and violent attitude towards other people; however, Bernard later discovered that not only had Emma faked her own death in order to escape being with him, but that several other people knew and had failed to tell him, including Fran, Bernard's parents and several of her close friends. This betrayal almost shattered their friendship, but they managed to reconcile. When questioned by Manny in Series 1 Episode 2, Bernard reveals that he thought he was gay 'for a bit', but that he was discouraged by 'the prohibitive standards of hygiene. And all that dancing.' It is revealed in "Grapes of Wrath" that he used to own a cat, Nipsey. Manny breaks to him the news that Nipsey is dead.

=== Manny Bianco ===
Manny Bianco, played by British actor and comedian Bill Bailey, is Bernard's assistant in the bookshop.

Unlike his boss – a surly misanthrope with little interest in selling books – Manny is an extremely helpful and skilful salesman, who is well liked by customers. Even his surname is the opposite of Bernard's (bianco meaning "white" in Italian). However, his nature makes him a target of Bernard's bullying nature; frequently being subjected to offensive insults, violent, and abusive treatment, and occasionally being patronised. In many episodes, Bernard has refused to even acknowledge Manny by name, instead referring to him by such titles as "Lord of the Rings", "Gandalf", "Thor", "Hawkwind", "Bigfoot", "half Iago, half Fu Manchu, all bastard", "Genghis", and "Ming the Merciless"; in reference to Manny's long, unkempt hair and bearded face, and often wishing upon him 'death by beard', most particularly by beard-seeking missile, and once even referred to him as a beard with an idiot hanging off it, as well as comparing his appearance to "a horse in a man costume".

Formerly an accountant, Manny encountered Bernard Black in the first episode of the series, "Cooking the Books", when purchasing The Little Book of Calm from Bernard's shop on his way to work one morning. In contrast to his demeanour later in the series, Manny is highly stressed; evidently as a result of his being an accountant, as he tells Bernard "I hate my job!" on their first meeting. Following an unusual series of circumstances, Manny accidentally swallowed his copy of The Little Book of Calm and assimilated the book into his body. For a brief period, he was extremely relaxed, and, with his serene expression and hospital bed-gown, bore an alarming resemblance to Jesus Christ. During this time, he spoke entirely in soothing aphorisms, and was able to use his apparent powers of calming to silence both a barking dog and a car alarm. His beatific demeanour and vocal impedient were later removed during a violent encounter with skinhead Millwall supporters. Bernard drunkenly hired Manny to work at Black Books, much to his dismay and annoyance upon sobering up. He intended to fire Manny despite being a skilled and personable salesman (on the basis that Black Books is "not that kind of operation"), but quickly changed his mind when Manny revealed the presence of a bottle of wine to celebrate a successful first day of work.

Manny experiences the most remarkable events of any of the characters, and possesses some remarkable idiot-savant talents, such as the ability to play the piano at concert standard after hearing a piano piece on the radio. He has been worshipped by a tribe of savage cannibals in Canada (which Bernard would rather no one discuss, by mutual agreement).

Because Manny is the only person in the shop who demonstrates any sort of desire to keep the place tidy, Bernard treats him as little more than an indentured servant, to be kept hostage, ordered around, and forced to do petty tasks with little reward. His relationship with Fran Katzenjammer, Bernard's best friend, is much better since it is based on mutual appreciation and numerous shared interests (including celebrity gossip.) However, Fran is not above exploiting and belittling Manny when it advances her interests.

Manny reacts to such poor treatment in an extremely laid back and, at times, even proud fashion. However, he has snapped on numerous occasions throughout the series, usually after Bernard's bullying pushed him too far. In the first series, Bernard's increasingly dictatorial manner forced Manny to leave home, only to sheepishly return following a brief period working as a model for a photographer with a beard fetish. Manny occasionally demonstrates a strict and in control persona. Following a brief session with a therapist, Manny stood up to Bernard with such confidence and authority that he reduced Bernard from his usual bullying arrogance to an almost tearful, emotional wreck, over the course of a short conversation. Alcohol sometimes strengthens Manny's resolve, and in the final episode of the series, a drunken Manny was quick to tell Bernard exactly what he thought of him after Bernard made one too many sneering comments about Rowena, a woman on whom Manny had a crush. Although rare, these occasions have the short-lived effect of Bernard acting much more respectful and compassionate in his treatment of Manny.

On numerous occasions throughout the series, Manny has demonstrated that he is talented and well liked, and that he could have done more with his life were it not for the ignorance and apathy of those around him, and his own lack of confidence and his eager-to-help tendencies. He often seems to demonstrate a hidden creative streak, such as by creating various bizarre yet ingenious pieces of equipment around the apartment and shop. One of these items was a helmet with cleaning spray attached, which was operated by pulling a string.

Manny is artistically talented, capable of drawing an incredibly detailed, coloured illustration of children building a sandcastle on a beach in only a few seconds with one pencil. He is a talented pianist, capable of picking up numerous complex pieces by ear, without any previous lessons (Bailey is himself a talented musician, has perfect pitch, and played all these pieces himself). He quickly decided not to further himself in this regard, due to his skills being exploited, rather than appreciated, by Bernard and Fran. A deleted scene from series one also portrayed Manny as a talented guitarist.

Although Manny's personal relationships rarely appear on the show, he has had more success in romance than Fran and Bernard. In the final episode, despite his nervous and awkward approach to his relationship with a woman Rowena, she appeared quite smitten with him. This led to a romantic encounter, and the possibility of a successful relationship.

=== Fran Katzenjammer ===
Enid Francesca "Fran" Katzenjammer, played by Tamsin Greig, is Bernard's best, oldest, and as Fran claims, only friend. There is an implication that they experienced a drunken sexual encounter, but Bernard states he isn't "allowed to remember it". For the first series, she ran a shop, Nifty Gifty (selling, as Fran put it, "a lot of wank"), next door to Black Books, and would often mind Bernard's shop whilst he was out. However, Fran's business went bankrupt, and since then she has been unemployed and as Bernard claims, "unemployable".

She is man-hungry, and constantly on the look-out for a relationship; the few she does attempt, however, have been little short of disastrous for all concerned, and her personal ad reads "30 something woman seeks solvent man for sex and possible friendship, sense of humour irrelevant". She has also been characterised as somewhat neurotic throughout the series. Her most significant turn-on appears to be the voice – most particularly of an old college acquaintance who can "melt me at 20 paces" in Fran's estimation, with an absurdly deep "Hello Fran". Like Bernard, she possesses a great enthusiasm for drinking and smoking (Katzenjammer is an antiquated German word for "hangover"; literally "the howling of cats"); however, she genuinely likes Manny and unlike Bernard usually treats him as a true friend (although like Bernard, this doesn't stop her from routinely exploiting his eager-to-help nature). Despite all available evidence to the contrary, she has somehow deluded herself into thinking that she's more normal than Bernard and Manny. In the last episode of Black Books we discover that Fran's real name is in fact Enid.

== Other appearances ==
Ep.	Actor	Role
3.4	Keith Allen	Dave "Mouse Ears" Smith
2.3	Rob Brydon	B. Nugent
1.2	David Cann	The roaring customer
3.2	Olivia Colman	Tanya
2.1	Nina Conti	Kate, Bernard's date
3.3	Annette Crosbie	Manny's mother 'Moo-Ma'
3.2	Lucy Davis	Becky
1.6	Omid Djalili	Trebor the photographer
2.4	Mark Donovan	Cousin Gregor
3.4	Justin Edwards	Customer/Poker Player
1.3	Kevin Eldon	The Cleaner
1.1	Martin Freeman	Manny's doctor
1.5	Nick Frost	Alarm installer
2.3	Ricky Grover	Danny
1.4	Liam Hess	Jimbo
2.5	Jessica Hynes	Eva, Fran's Yoga partner
2.2	Rose Keegan	Fran's neighbour
3.3	Sam Kelly	Manny's father 'Moo-Pa'
3.4	Mac McDonald	American Customer
1.4	Colin McFarlane	Detective
2.3	Big Mick	Gus
2.4	Vincenzo Nicoli	Frederick
3.4	Craig Parkinson	Martin the Tout
3.1	Simon Pegg	Evan
3.5	Julian Rhind-Tutt	Jason
1.5	Peter Serafinowicz	Howell Granger
3.5	Catherine Shepherd	Bridget
1.1	Rupert Vansittart	The tasteful customer
2.2	Johnny Vegas	Fran's landlord
1.6	David Walliams	Customer
1.5	Tony Way	Fast food chain and cinema employee

== See also ==
- List of Black Books episodes
