= Stuck (TV series) =

British Television series

- Genre: Comedy
- Created by: Dylan Moran
- Written by: Dylan Moran
- Directed by: Ian Fitzgibbon
- Starring: Dylan Moran; Morgana Robinson
- Original language: English
- No. of series: 1
- No. of episodes: 5

Production
- Executive producer: Jimmy Mulville
- Producer: Nick Coupe
- Running time: 13 minutes
- Production company: Hat Trick Productions

Original release
- Network: BBC Two
- Release: 26 September 2022

Stuck is a British sitcom television series, created and written by Dylan Moran, and co-starring Moran and Morgana Robinson.

== Synopsis ==
Dark and surreal relationship comedy about a couple at a crossroads in life and - with Dan made redundant and Carla much younger and wanting a family - possibly with each other.

== Cast and characters ==
- Dylan Moran as Dan
- Morgana Robinson as Carla
- Juliet Cowan as Joy
- Clemens Schick as Kurt
- Neil Maskell as Dr Pete Cosmos

== Episodes ==
No.	Title	Directed by	Written by	Original release date	U.K. viewers (millions)
1	"Cat"	Ian Fitzgibbon	Dylan Moran	26 September 2022	N/A
2	"The Other Guy"	Ian Fitzgibbon	Dylan Moran	26 September 2022	N/A
3	"Cucumbenaires"	Ian Fitzgibbon	Dylan Moran	26 September 2022	N/A
4	"Cookies"	Ian Fitzgibbon	Dylan Moran	26 September 2022	N/A
5	"The Party"	Ian Fitzgibbon	Dylan Moran	26 September 2022	N/A

== Broadcast ==
An initial broadcast date of 8 September 2022 was delayed due to the death on that day of Queen Elizabeth II. The series was then made available on the BBC iPlayer in the UK on 26 September 2022, alongside a double bill on BBC Two.

== Reception ==
The Independent saw some charming moments but described it as "vapidly inoffensive", comparing it to Moran's previous show Black Books and his character's combination of "world-weary cynicism with a skittish energy". Barbara Ellen in The Guardian comments on the surrealism and says "Stuck meanders, and the jokes, while smart and spiky, feel rationed, but there’s much to enjoy in its wayward, woozy approach". Lucy Mangan in the same publication gave the show 5 stars, saying "...For those of us who love nothing more than comedy vignettes into which both the fleeting pleasures of life and its enduring melancholy have been distilled – well, you're going to want to smash your face into it as if it were a plateful of deliciously moist cake". The Financial Times said "Stuck has the feel of an old-fashioned domestic sitcom... But there is a deeper seam of melancholy in its portrait of two people for whom life hasn't panned out in the way they hoped and who lack the oomph to do anything about it", commenting that "Moran radiates the ennui of a man who has been left behind by the world... not much happens, which is deliberate since the series hinges on the drabness of their existence. As such, Stuck is the kind of show that will provoke wry smiles rather than hoots of laughter".
