= Imaginations (Fantastic Plastic Machine album) =

Studio album by Fantastic Plastic Machine
- Released: February 22, 2006
- Length: 54:45
- Label: Avex Trax, Cutting Edge
- Producer: Tomoyuki Tanaka, Masayuki Kumahara

Fantastic Plastic Machine chronology
Sound Concierge Annex (2005)	Imaginations (2006)	FPMB (2007)

Professional ratings
Review scores
Source	Rating
AllMusic	3.5/5 stars

Imaginations (sometimes stylized as imaginations) is the fifth studio album by Fantastic Plastic Machine. It was released on February 22, 2006. It peaked at number 38 on the Oricon Albums Chart.

== Track listing ==
No.	Title	Length
1.	"Xiang Xiang (Monologue)"	0:21
2.	"Fanfare" (featuring Tahiti 80)	3:36
3.	"Don't You Know?" (featuring Clazziquai)	3:32
4.	"Tell Me" (featuring Benjamin Diamond)	5:30
5.	"Paparuwa"	4:30
6.	"Dance Dance Dance Dance" (featuring Su)	6:04
7.	"Here in My Mind (Introduction to "Slippin' On Down")"	0:17
8.	"Slippin' On Down" (featuring Bob Arkin)	5:43
9.	"A World Without Love" (featuring Bonnie Pink)	4:25
10.	"French Kiss"	9:44
11.	"Obsession"	7:03
12.	"Take Me Away" (featuring Ugly Duckling)	3:25
13.	"End Roll"	0:48

== Charts ==
Chart	Peak position
Japanese Albums (Oricon)	38
