= Hsien of the Dead =

- Theatrical release poster
- Directed by: Gary Ow
- Written by: Gary Ow
- Based on: Shaun of the Dead by: Edgar Wright; Simon Pegg
- Produced by: Gary Ow
- Production companies: Monkeywrench; Genetix S Arte Associates
- Release date: 13 September 2012
- Running time: 72 minutes
- Country: Singapore
- Language: English
- Budget: S$350,000

Hsien of the Dead is a 2012 Singaporean horror-comedy film directed, produced, and written by Gary Ow for Monkeywrench, Genetix S Pte Ltd, and Arte Associates. The film stars Ernest Seah, Vivienne Tseng, Moses San Juan, Nurhada Choo, and Darrell Britt. It follows four unrelated Singaporeans escaping from a wave of animated corpses. Together they devise a plan to flee the zombie-infested city state. Released on 13 September 2012, the film is credited as "Singapore's first zombie movie".

== Plot ==
Ministry of Propaganda staff member Edward (Ernest Seah) discovers that his colleague has become a zombie. Without much struggle, he bashes the zombie with a mop and escapes the government building. Outside, he discovers that almost all of Singapore has been infected with a zombie virus. He teams up with martial arts practitioner Ah Huay (Vivienne Tseng), biker Hana (Nurhada Choo), and army enlistee Hsien (Moses San Juan) and together they try to work out an escape plan from Singapore.

== Production ==
The film is credited as "Singapore's first zombie movie". Ernest Seah played Edward, a civil servant in the army. Vivienne Tseng was cast as Ah Huay, the protagonist female fighter. American actor Darrell Britt, who acted in The Matrix (1999), appeared as terrorist "Mas Alamak" in the film.

Inspired by the British horror-comedy Shaun of the Dead (2004), Hsien of the Dead was collaboratively produced by three companies – Monkeywrench, Genetix S, and Arte Associates. Filmmaker Gary Ow signed on to direct, produce, and write the screenplay. Ow had previously been in charge of scripting the comedy play, Vampire Monologues. The film was reportedly "[s]hot entirely with a handheld Canon EOS 7D camera and wireless Sennheiser body microphones". Funded by Arte Associates, the film was made on an estimated budget of S$350,000, inclusive of promotion costs.

== Release ==
The film first had a non-theatrical limited release in Singapore on 22 June 2012, followed by a three-day-run in cinemas from 13 September 2012 to 15 September 2012.
