= Spaced: Soundtrack to the TV Series =

Soundtrack album by Various
- Released: 2001
- Genre: Electronica
- Label: 4 Music
- Producer: Various

The 2001 soundtrack Spaced: Soundtrack to the TV Series accompanied the first series of the Channel 4 situation comedy Spaced. The soundtrack was jointly released on DVD and VHS with the first series.

The Guy Pratt mashup of Camisra's "Let Me Show You" and the A-Team theme music was never made commercially available.

== Track listing ==
1. "Warm Up Music" (0:08)
2. "Theme Of Luxury" - Fantastic Plastic Machine (1:05)
3. "Count Five Or Six" - Cornelius (3:03)
4. "Beat Goes On" - All Seeing I (4:00)
5. "We're A Couple" - "John Shakespeare - Sandals In The Sand" (0:04)
6. "Gritty Shaker" - David Holmes (6:10)
7. "Smash It" - Fuzz Townshend (4:17)
8. "There Must Be An Angel" - Fantastic Plastic Machine (3:58)
9. "It's Over" (0:05)
10. "Homespin Rerun (Kid Loco Space Raid Remix) - High Llamas (7:47)
11. "We're Gonna Get Our Dog Back" - (generic military snare drum march) (0:05)
12. "Absurd (Whitewash Edit)" - Fluke (3:39)
13. "More Beats And Pieces" - Coldcut (4:03)
14. "Morse" - Nightmares On Wax (6:20)
15. "If We Have It They Will Come" (0:04)
16. "Bobby Dazzler" - Sons Of Silence (4:53)
17. "Delta Sun Bottleneck Stomp (Chemical Brothers Remix)" - Mercury Rev (6:22)
18. "Disco Fudge" (0:13)
19. "Synth And Strings" - Yomanda (3:18)
20. "Test Card" - Fuzz Townshend (3:30)
21. "This Party Is Rubbish" (0:04)
22. "King Of Rock And Roll" - Prefab Sprout (4:23)
23. "S'Il Vous Plait - Fantastic Plastic Machine (5:39)
24. "Fake Sex Noises" (0:08)
