= Dylan Moran =

Irish actor and comedian (born 1971)

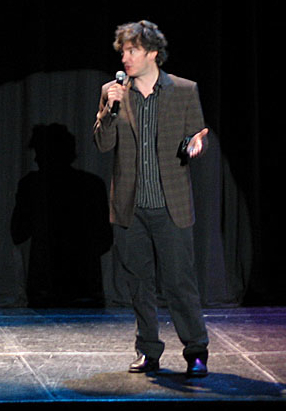
- Moran performing at the Melbourne International Comedy Festival Gala in April 2006
- Born: Dylan William Moran; 1971 or 1972 (age 54–55); Navan, County Meath, Ireland
- Spouse: Elaine Moran (m. 1997; div. 2022)
- Children: 2

Comedy career
- Years active: 1992–present
- Medium: Stand-up; film; television
- Genres: Observational comedy; black comedy; deadpan; satire; surreal humour
- Website: dylanmoran.com

Dylan William Moran (/ˈmɔːrən/ MOR-ən; born 1971 or 1972) is an Irish comedian, writer, actor and artist. He is best known for his observational comedy, the comedy series Black Books (which he co-wrote and starred in), and his work with Simon Pegg in films such as Shaun of the Dead and Run Fatboy Run. He was also one of two lead characters in the Irish black comedy film A Film with Me in It.

He is a regular performer at national and international comedy festivals such as the Edinburgh Festival Fringe, Just for Laughs Montreal Comedy Festival, the Melbourne International Comedy Festival, and the Kilkenny Comedy Festival. In 2007, he was voted the 17th greatest stand-up comedian by Channel 4; in the updated 2010 list, he was ranked as the 14th greatest.

== Early life ==
Dylan William Moran was born in 1971 in Navan, County Meath. He attended St Patrick's Classical School, where he experimented early on with stand-up alongside fellow comedians Tommy Tiernan and Hector Ó hEochagáin; he left with his Leaving Certificate at age 16. He has said that he then spent four years unemployed "drinking and writing bad poetry". He worked as a florist at some point, but hated it and quit after a week. In 2021, Moran told NME magazine that a track that reminds him of home and "of Dublin when I was young" was "The Business Enterprise (My Friend John)", a 1985 Irish one-hit wonder.

He has said that he was very passionate about rugby and enjoyed watching many games when he was growing up, but has since lost interest and has none in any other sport either. He nonetheless makes an effort to keep somewhat abreast of popular sport, explaining: "otherwise nobody would talk to me, as it's very hard to find anyone else who's not rabid about sport."

== Career ==
Moran came to comedy at age 20 after watching Ardal O'Hanlon and other comedians perform at Dublin's Comedy Cellar, a fifty-seater comedy club with no microphone, in the basement of The International Bar on South Wicklow Street. He began his stand-up there in 1992 and got a good reception. In 1993, he won the So You Think You're Funny award at the Edinburgh Festival. He went on to become the second youngest person to win the Perrier Comedy Award in 1996 at the Edinburgh Festival at age 24. Gurgling For Money was Moran's first major one-man stand-up UK tour in 1997. He went on to perform at many other festivals including the Hay Festival, Montreal comedy festival, Vancouver Comedy Festival and the Edinburgh Festival. Between 1995 and 1997 Moran wrote a weekly column for The Irish Times.

Moran won his first major television role in 1998, playing Ian Lyons in the BBC 2 sitcom How Do You Want Me?, opposite Charlotte Coleman. He went on to appear in a small role in the 1999 movie Notting Hill as a shoplifter. In 2000, Black Books was launched on Channel 4. The sitcom, about depressed, bitter, alcoholic, chain-smoking and misanthropic book shop owner Bernard Black, was based on a dream Moran had in the mid-eighties during a weekend away in Limerick. The first series was written with fellow Irishman Graham Linehan, and produced by Mark Buckley and Albert Kenny of Kenley Studios. The second series was televised in 2002, and the third, which aired in 2004, was greeted with great enthusiasm by critics and fans alike. In the same year Moran appeared in his first major film role, playing David in the horror comedy Shaun of the Dead.

Moran toured his stand-up shows Monster I and Monster II in 2004, including performances in New York and Milan, as well as a tour across Britain and Ireland which culminated in a week-long run at London's Palace Theatre, before two shows at Dublin's Vicar Street, and finally an appearance at the Hay Festival. The tour was described by The Times as a "masterclass of comic charisma: swinging from topic to topic in a manner seemingly spontaneous but actually tightly organised".

A live DVD of the Monster II tour, filmed on 28 May at Dublin's Vicar Street, was released that year, as Moran's first live stand-up DVD. After a successful run in New York City in 2004 as part of the British/Irish Comedy Invasion (including performances by top British and Irish comedians such as Eddie Izzard, fellow Black Books star Bill Bailey and Irish comedian Tommy Tiernan) Moran returned to New York for a month-long run at the Village Theatre. He then performed a two-week London West End run at the Wyndham's Theatre, 1–13 November 2004.

His third major tour, Like, Totally, opened at the Buxton Opera House on 3 May 2005, and as with his previous tours the stand-up routine was accompanied by projected cartoons drawn by Moran. A DVD of the tour was released in December 2005. Moran appeared as the character of Gordon in the comedy film Run Fatboy Run, released in September 2007 which cast Moran as the best friend to protagonist Dennis, played by Simon Pegg. Moran had previously played an adversary to Pegg's title character in Shaun of the Dead.

In June 2008, Moran appeared with Ardal O'Hanlon and Tommy Tiernan at Liverpool's Echo Arena in 'The Three Fellas', a one-off comedy event, part of the city's European Capital of Culture 2008 celebrations. Between October and December 2008, Moran embarked on What It Is, a new UK tour starting at the Grand Opera House in York, and ending at Oxford's New Theatre. The tour was extended into 2009 and has now been released on DVD.

A compilation DVD of highlights from Moran's three previous stand-up shows was made available in November 2010 called Dylan Moran: Aim Low. Yeah, Yeah, a stand-up tour of Scandinavia, the Baltic states, United States, Australia, New Zealand, Ireland and the UK began in April 2011.

In 2012, Moran performed shows in Russia (following two sold-out performances in neighbouring Estonia). The show's promoters indicated that they believed it to be the first time an Irish stand-up had performed live in a Russian venue; his routine mocked Russia's new law banning "homosexual propaganda" and jailed oil tycoon Mikhail Khodorkovsky.

In 2014, Moran wrote a pilot for ABC about "news media and conflict, war zones and cable news". The channel decided not to go ahead with the show but may possibly sell it to another network. The same year he appeared in John Michael McDonagh's film Calvary. The following July he took his stand-up show Off the Hook to South Africa for the first time, performing three sold-out shows at the country's National Arts Festival.

In 2018, Moran took his latest standup show Dr Cosmos on tour, starting with 42 dates in the UK before touring Europe and Australia in 2019. The DVD was released in 2021.

In June 2019, Moran reported he was developing a "small format" show for the BBC. Moran finished the series during the COVID-19 pandemic, when live performances were effectively cancelled. The series, Stuck, starred Moran and Morgana Robinson and was notable for episodes being only fifteen minutes long in keeping with Moran's belief that shorter content is trending. It aired on BBC Two in 2022.

Moran began touring his most recent standup show, We Got This, in November 2021, touring Ireland and the UK in 2022 and Europe, Australia and New Zealand in 2023. In 2025, he made his Shakesperian debut as the fool Touchstone in Ralph Fiennes' production of As You Like It at the Theatre Royal, Bath.

== Awards and commendations ==
At the Edinburgh Festival Fringe, he won the 'So You Think You're Funny? Award' in 1993, and the Perrier Award in 1996. He later dismissed the latter as "a load of media rubbish," stating Bill Bailey deserved it more.

A popular poll commissioned by Channel 4 ranked him the 14th-greatest comedy stand-up. Moran was declared "the greatest comedian, living or dead" by the French newspaper Le Monde in July 2007. He has also twice won the BAFTA TV Award for Best Situation Comedy, both for Black Books.

== Personal life ==
Moran married his wife Elaine in 1997. They lived in Edinburgh with their two children. In 2022, Moran and Elaine divorced.

Moran quit smoking in 2014 and became teetotal in 2018, but has since resumed drinking.

== Filmography ==
=== Film ===
Year	Film	Role
1999	Notting Hill	Rufus the Thief
2003	The Actors	Tom Quirk
2004	Shaun of the Dead	David
2005	A Cock and Bull Story	Dr Slop
2006	Tell It to the Fishes	Finn
2007	Run Fatboy Run	Gordon
2008	A Film with Me in It	Pierce
2011	The Decoy Bride	Charley
2012	Good Vibrations	Pat
2014	Calvary	Michael Fitzgerald
2020	Pixie	Potential Buyer
2024	The Killer's Game	Father O'Brien

=== Television ===
Year	Title	Role	Notes
1998–1999	How Do You Want Me?	Ian Lyons	
2000–2004	Black Books	Bernard Black	Also creator and writer
2012	Little Crackers	Father	1 episode, also writer
2017	Uncle	Marsh	4 episodes
2022	The Witcher: Blood Origin	Uthrok One-Nut	
2022	Stuck	Dan	Lead role, BBC original comedy

== Stand-up DVDs ==
Title	Released	Notes
Monster – Live	15 November 2004	Live at Dublin's Vicar Street
Like, Totally... Dylan Moran Live	27 November 2006	Live at London's Hammersmith Apollo
What It Is – Live	23 November 2009	Live at Sydney's State Theatre
Aim Low: The Best of Dylan Moran	29 November 2010	Selected scenes from previous three DVDs
Yeah, Yeah – Live in London	14 November 2011	Live at London's Hammersmith Apollo
Off the Hook	30 November 2015	Live at London's Hammersmith Apollo
Dr Cosmos	8 November 2021	Live in Australia

== See also ==
- List of atheists in film, radio, television and theatre
