= Beautiful (Fantastic Plastic Machine album) =

Studio album by Fantastic Plastic Machine
- Released: January 17, 2001
- Genre: House
- Length: 56:35
- Labels: Avex Trax; Emperor Norton
- Producer: Tomoyuki Tanaka

Fantastic Plastic Machine chronology
Luxury (1998)	Beautiful (2001)	Contact (2001)

Professional ratings
Aggregate scores
Source	Rating
Metacritic	63/100
Review scores
Source	Rating
AllMusic	3/5 stars
Alternative Press	6/10
Pitchfork	8.1/10
Uncut	4.5/5 stars

Beautiful (sometimes stylized as beautiful.) is the third studio album by Japanese musician Fantastic Plastic Machine. It was released on January 17, 2001 by Avex Trax, and peaked at number 38 on the Oricon Albums Chart. The album was released in the United States on May 15, 2001 by Emperor Norton Records.

== Track listing ==
No.	Title	Writer(s)	Length
1.	"I Am Beautiful"	Tomoyuki Tanaka	0:03
2.	"Beautiful Days"	Tanaka; Dan Miyakawa	4:29
3.	"Paragon"	Tanaka	5:09
4.	"Love Is Psychedelic"	Tanaka	6:00
5.	"On a Chair"	Tanaka; Miyakawa	6:17
6.	"Whistle Song"	Eric Kupper	8:02
7.	"One Minute of Love"	Tanaka	1:00
8.	"Todos os desejos"	Tanaka; Miyakawa; C. L. R. James	7:27
9.	"I'm Still a Simple Man"	Tanaka; Miyakawa; Hirth Martinez	4:41
10.	"Black Dada"	Tanaka	3:59
11.	"God Save the Mona Lisa"	Tanaka; Miyakawa; Martinez	5:13
12.	"Beautiful Days (Reprise)"	Tanaka; Miyakawa	4:15
Total length:			56:35

US edition bonus track
No.	Title	Writer(s)	Length
13.	"Take Me to the Disco" (Malibu mix)	Tanaka	6:35
Total length:			63:10

== Charts ==
Chart (2001)	Peak position
Japanese Albums (Oricon)	38
