= List of Spaced characters =

Spaced is a British television situation comedy written by and starring Simon Pegg and Jessica Stevenson, and directed by Edgar Wright. Two series of seven episodes were broadcast in 1999 and 2001 on Channel 4. Listed below are major and minor characters that appear in the two series.

== Main characters ==
- Tim Bisley (played by Simon Pegg): Tim is an aspiring comic book artist. At the start of the series, his girlfriend, Sarah (played by Anna Wilson-Jones), has broken up with him after an affair with his friend Duane Benzie (played by Peter Serafinowicz). He initially works as an assistant manager at a comic book shop, "Fantasy Bazaar", alongside its manager, Bilbo Bagshot (played by Bill Bailey). In the second series, he lands his dream job as a graphic artist at Dark Star Comics. Tim's name is a reference to renowned 2000 AD comic artist, Simon Bisley.
- Daisy Steiner (played by Jessica Stevenson): Daisy is an aspiring writer. At the start of the series, she is living in a squat, and has a boyfriend in Hull. After they break up, she obtains a Miniature Schnauzer, Colin, from a rescue shelter. Although she rarely gets any work published due to extreme procrastination, she goes travelling in Asia after selling some articles at the end of the first series.
- Marsha Klein (played by Julia Deakin): Marsha, the alcoholic landlady, is never seen without a lit cigarette in one hand, and a glass of red wine in the other. Once a promising young athlete, she retired from athletics after receiving a leg injury and became a groupie instead, resulting in several marriages that ended badly and a teenage daughter, Amber, with whom she frequently argues. She is excited to have new, young friends, but is the only one who does not know that Tim and Daisy are not actually a couple.
- Brian Topp (played by Mark Heap): The lodger in the flat below Tim and Daisy's, Brian is an angst-ridden artist. He is in love with Twist, and embarked on a troublesome relationship with her before they broke up towards the end of series two. The character of Brian was originally written for Julian Barratt, who had previously worked with Wright, Pegg and Stevenson in their previous series Asylum. Barratt was unable to play the role so Mark Heap was cast instead.
- Mike Watt (played by Nick Frost): Mike is Tim's best friend. He is a weapons expert and is obsessed with military order, protocol and lifestyle. He wishes dearly that he could join the British Army, but is ineligible having suffered detached retinas as a child when jumping from a tree after being encouraged by Tim. He is restricted to membership of the Territorial Army. The first series reveals that he was thrown out of the TA for stealing a Chieftain tank and trying to invade Paris with it while on weekend manoeuvres in France, being apprehended after making a stop at Euro Disney. He is granted readmission by the end of the first series, and advanced to the rank of sergeant during the second series. The character was based on a recurring joke between Simon Pegg and Nick Frost (who are best friends outside of the series). When writing Spaced, Pegg included the character and persuaded Edgar Wright to cast Frost.
- Twist Morgan (played by Katy Carmichael): Twist, Daisy's best friend, claims to work "in fashion"; her job is at a dry cleaner. She is a superficial fashion obsessive. Although she and Brian are social opposites with little in common, they embark on an intense relationship.
- Colin (played by Ada the Dog): Colin is Daisy's dog, a Miniature Schnauzer which she bought from a dogs' home to cheer herself up after being dumped by her boyfriend Richard. In the first series, Colin is abducted by an evil "freelance vivisectionist" and held at an animal testing facility. Despite his initial mortal fear of dogs, Tim eventually manages to bond with Colin by this time, so he leads Mike, Brian, Daisy, and Twist on a rescue mission to get him back home. In real life, Colin is actually a female named Ada (although this is incorrectly spelt as 'Aida' on the credits). A comment made by Nick Frost during filming of a scene with Ada about dogs being unable to look up is referred to in the comedy film Shaun of the Dead.

== Recurring characters ==
- Sarah (played by Anna Wilson-Jones): Sarah is the ex-girlfriend who broke Tim's heart by leaving him for his friend, Duane, and kicking him out of their flat. She later wants to reconcile with Tim but he realizes that it is best for him to move on. She subsequently gets back with Duane.
- Richard (played by James Lance): Daisy's boyfriend. Their pet names for each other are "Daisy Duke" and "Boss Hogg". They are in a long-distance relationship (he lives in Hull) but he later breaks up with her over the phone after she confesses to having cheated on him.
- Duane Benzie (played by Peter Serafinowicz): The arrogant and intimidating gravelly-voiced back-stabber who stole Sarah away from Tim. He was Sarah's boss and Tim's close friend until Tim learned of their affair. In the episode "Battles", Tim gets his revenge by shooting Duane in the testicles at close range in a paintball game. In "Gone", episode 5 of series 2, he steals Tim's keys in an attempt to exact revenge on him, only to end up colliding with a gang of young hooligans in his prized Mazda MX-5, after which they proceed to beat him up.
- Amber Klein (played by Theo Park and voiced by Jessica Stevenson): Marsha's bratty teenage daughter. She and her mother constantly argue and the arguments always end with Amber storming out of the house. The sound of Amber leaving becomes a cue to Tim and Daisy that Marsha will come by wanting to talk. Amber's face is never seen (although it is briefly shown in an extremely blurred photograph in a deleted scene). Marsha has called her "The Devil in an A-cup" (in the first series) and "Duchess of the D-grade" (in the second series), among other things. In Episode 2 of Series 2, Amber moves out of 23 Meteor Street after an argument with Marsha.
- Tyres O'Flaherty (played by Michael Smiley): A Northern Irish bike messenger and a friend of Tim and Mike's, who is prone to violent mood swings. He is a raver and dances to mundane rhythms such as a phone ringing or a car horn honking. A zombie version of Tyres appears briefly, still dancing, in Shaun of the Dead.
- Bilbo Bagshot (played by Bill Bailey): Tim's boss at the comic book store, "Fantasy Bazaar". In series 2, Bilbo fires Tim for his inability to get over his dislike of The Phantom Menace, but later begs him to return, inspired by Tim leaving a message begging him to do so on his answer-phone.
- Damien Knox (played by Clive Russell): The head of Dark Star Comics, the company that Tim desperately longs to work for. When Tim first submitted his portfolio, Damien laughed him out of the office. Since then, Tim has been haunted by visions of Damien laughing at him, and is afraid of submitting a new portfolio to him. When he sees Tim's work again, he is very impressed. In the DVD commentary, it is revealed that Damien is based on Herr Starr from Preacher.
- Sophie (played by Lucy Akhurst): Damien's beautiful assistant who helps Tim get hired at Dark Star. They begin dating, provoking jealousy in both Daisy and Mike. In the last episode of series 2, she accepts a job offer at Marvel Comics in Seattle.
- Dexter and Cromwell (played by Reece Shearsmith and Jonathan Ryland): Mike's rivals in the Territorial Army. They destroy Mike and Tim's combat robot in an effort to take their place in Robot Wars, but eventually have to settle it at the shadowy underground community "Robot Club" (a reference to Fight Club). Later, Mike earns the rank of sergeant and becomes their superior. In the final episode of the series, they are compelled to assist in Mike's plan to convince Marsha not to sell the house. Dexter's name and his snide persona is a pun of Sinister Dexter.
