= Too (Fantastic Plastic Machine album) =

Studio album by Fantastic Plastic Machine
- Released: February 26, 2003
- Length: 54:04
- Label: Avex Trax, Cutting Edge
- Producer: Tomoyuki Tanaka, Dan Miyakawa

Fantastic Plastic Machine chronology
Contact (2001)	Too (2003)	Zoo (2004)

Too (sometimes stylized as too) is the fourth studio album by Fantastic Plastic Machine. It was released on February 26, 2003. It peaked at number 35 on the Oricon Albums Chart. It includes contributions from Incognito, Verbal, Maki Takamiya, Ryohei Yamamoto, Coralie Clément, and Ward E. Sexton.

== Track listing ==
No.	Title	Length
1.	"Overture of Too"	0:47
2.	"Reaching for the Stars"	4:59
3.	"Why Not?"	5:24
4.	"The King of Pleasure"	7:20
5.	"Spectacular"	4:59
6.	"Supervenience"	6:41
7.	"Philosophy (Full Spoken Mix)"	4:44
8.	"Submission"	0:59
9.	"Days and Days"	4:56
10.	"Euphoria"	6:55
11.	"Reaching for the Stars (Reprise)"	1:28
12.	"Never Ever (Extra Vocal Mix)"	5:57
13.	"Da Judge"	0:05

== Charts ==
Chart	Peak position
Japanese Albums (Oricon)	35
