= Paul Wilson (meditation teacher) =

- Paul Wilson at 'Mind and its Potential' Conference.
- Born: 1949 or 1950 (age 76–77)
- Writing career
- Subjects: Calm, peace of mind, meditation, spiritual growth
- Notable work: Little Book of Calm
- Website: www.calmcentre.com

Paul Wilson is an Australian marketing professional and meditation teacher, who is the author of self-help books such as The Little Book of Calm, Calm at Work, The Calm Technique, Instant Calm, and Calm, No Matter What, mainly on the topic of finding peace of mind in everyday life. He has been called The Guru of Calm, and some of his books have been bestsellers, but have also been criticised for offering unhelpful or counterproductive advice.

Wilson was born in Ilfracombe, Queensland, in 1948.

In 2008, The Independent newspaper included him on a list of 100 people who make Britain a happier place.

== Books ==
Wilson's books have been translated into 24 languages.

The Calm Technique was published in 1987 by Thornsons Publishing and has been reprinted and translated into several languages.

The Little Book of Calm (ISBN 0-14028526-1) was published by Penguin Books in 1996. It was on The Sunday Times Bestseller List for more than 80 weeks. The book contains brief quotes and snippets of advice, which, according to Daniel Johnson of The Times, are "often wordier versions of hoary old adages"; Johnson also criticises advice he perceives as unrealistic, such as "Take on only one deadline at a time" or "Take a lesson in calmness from children", self-contradictory, and repetitive. Clinical nurse specialist Brendan McMahon called the book "essentially a collection of reassuring folk wisdom" with advice ranging from the sensible to the naïve. Deborah Ross in The Independent called the snippets of advice in the book "happy-clappy guff"; a review in 2003 described The Little Book of Calm as "short on words but long on meaning", and claimed that it was "the first and still one of the best books aimed at counteracting stress".

Wilson published a number of books in a similar format, including The Little Book of Calm at Work, The Little Book of Sleep, and The Little Book of Hope. Joe Joseph, reviewing The Little Book of Calm at Work for The Times, was very critical towards the book and claimed that "much of Wilson's advice is actually counter-productive" in that it created rather than alleviated anxiety at work.

The Quiet (ISBN 978-1-40503766-2) was published in 2006 by Pan MacMillan in the UK and Australia and by Tarcher/Penguin in the USA.

Calm: No Matter What (ISBN 978-1-40503934-5 was published by Pan MacMillan in 2014.

=== References in popular culture ===
The Little Book of Calm was featured in the first episode of the British comedy Black Books, when Manny Bianco accidentally swallowed a copy of it. The book is later absorbed into his body, and he is able to dole out helpful calm-inviting comments to passersby, such as "When you're feeling under pressure, do something different. Roll up your sleeves, or eat an orange".
