= Mark Donovan (actor) =

Welsh character actor (born 1968)

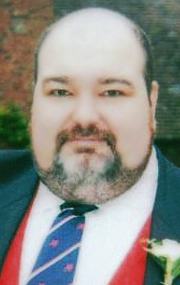
- Donovan at his wedding, 2005
- Born: David Alun Thomas; 12 October 1968 (age 57); Aberdare, Wales
- Website: mark.donovan.net

Mark Donovan (born 12 October 1968) is a Welsh character actor best known for his roles in productions such as Shaun of the Dead, Black Books, In Bruges, and Murder Investigation Team. He also played a brief scene of Hamlet in an episode of the David Renwick comedy-drama, Love Soup. His stage roles include Gozark in Singin' in the Rain and Inspector Clay in Plan 9 from Outer Space.

Donovan is also a voice actor, providing voiceovers on the long-running BBC news programme Newsnight and extensively with Big Finish Productions on their range of audio dramas. He has appeared in The Tomorrow People, Dalek Empire, 2000 AD, Sarah Jane Smith, Bernice Summerfield and Luther Arkwright plays, but is best known for his various appearances in the Doctor Who range, most notably as the companion Shayde in the Fifth Doctor play No Place Like Home.

In October 2004 Donovan appeared on the cover of international magazine Fangoria to illustrate the magazine's coverage of Shaun of the Dead.

== Personal life ==
Donovan was born in Aberdare and brought up in Bridgend, Wales.

== Filmography ==
Year	Title	Role	Notes
2000	Cyberon	Bouncer	
2004	Shaun of the Dead	Hulking Zombie	
2006	Perfect Day: The Millennium	Lady Killer	TV movie
2007	The Seeker: The Dark is Rising	Fight Promoter	
2008	In Bruges	Overweight Man	
2012	Les Misérables	Portly Customer	
2013	The World's End	Big Ugly Bastard	(final film role)
