= Shaun of the Dead =

2004 film by Edgar Wright

- British theatrical release poster
- Directed by: Edgar Wright
- Written by: Simon Pegg; Edgar Wright
- Produced by: Nira Park
- Starring: Simon Pegg; Kate Ashfield; Lucy Davis; Nick Frost; Dylan Moran; Bill Nighy; Penelope Wilton
- Cinematography: David M. Dunlap
- Edited by: Chris Dickens
- Music by: Pete Woodhead; Daniel Mudford
- Production companies: Working Title Films; WT² Productions; Big Talk Productions
- Distributed by: Universal Pictures (through United International Pictures)
- Release dates: 29 March 2004 (London); 9 April 2004 (United Kingdom); 24 September 2004 (United States)
- Running time: 99 minutes
- Country: United Kingdom
- Language: English
- Budget: £4 million ($6 million)
- Box office: $38.7 million

Shaun of the Dead is a 2004 British zombie comedy film directed by Edgar Wright and written by Wright and Simon Pegg. Pegg stars as Shaun, a downtrodden London salesman who is caught alongside his loved ones in a zombie apocalypse. It also stars Nick Frost in his film debut, Kate Ashfield, Lucy Davis, Dylan Moran, Bill Nighy, and Penelope Wilton. It is the first film in Wright and Pegg's Three Flavours Cornetto trilogy, followed by Hot Fuzz (2007) and The World's End (2013).

Shaun of the Dead was inspired by ideas Pegg and Wright used for their 1999–2001 television sitcom Spaced, particularly an episode in which Pegg's character hallucinates a zombie invasion. The film references the Night of the Living Dead films by George A. Romero. Principal photography took place across London and at Ealing Studios for nine weeks between May and June 2003.

Shaun of the Dead premiered in London on 29 March 2004, before it was theatrically released in the United Kingdom on 9 April 2004 and in the United States on 24 September. It was met with critical acclaim and commercial success, grossing $38.7 million worldwide on a budget of $6.1 million and receiving three nominations at the British Academy Film Awards. It was ranked third on the Channel 4 list of the 50 Greatest Comedy Films and quickly acquired a cult following. In film studies, it is seen as a product of post-9/11 anxiety, and portrait of post-Thatcher Britain as well as a model for transnational comedy, while the zombie outbreak as depicted in the film has been used as a modelling example for disease control.

== Plot ==
In the Crouch End area of London, 29-year-old sales advisor Shaun is disrespected by his colleagues, does not get along with his stepfather Philip, and is dumped by his girlfriend Liz after he promises to improve himself but is unsuccessful in making decent plans for an anniversary date. At his favourite pub, the Winchester, a heartbroken Shaun gets drunk with his slacker best friend Ed. At home, Shaun and Ed's roommate Pete complains of a bite wound from a mugger and berates Shaun, telling him to stop leaning on Ed and to get his life together.

The following day, a zombie apocalypse has overwhelmed London. Shaun and Ed do not notice until they encounter two zombies in their garden, whom they beat to death after throwing household implements and Shaun's vinyl collection at them. They devise a plan to rescue Shaun's mother, Barbara, and Liz, and then wait out the crisis at The Winchester. They escape from a now-zombified Pete by stealing his car. They pick up Philip, who has been bitten, and Barbara. Ed deliberately crashes Pete's car so he can drive Philip's Jaguar Series 3. They fetch Liz and her flatmates David and Dianne. Philip reconciles with Shaun before becoming a zombie.

Forced to abandon the car and their weapons, they sneak through the neighbourhood and briefly encounter a group led by Shaun's friend Yvonne, with each group member resembling a doppelgänger of the other group's members. Shaun defends Barbara from a zombie and impales it with a swingball pole. After imitating zombies to bypass a horde and reach The Winchester, Shaun and Ed argue when Ed wastes time on his phone, attracting the zombies' attention. David panics and breaks a window of The Winchester, forcing Shaun to lure the horde away using himself as bait before returning.

As the group takes refuge inside The Winchester, Shaun discovers that the zombies followed him, and Ed inadvertently attracts them by playing on the pub's slot machine. While fighting the pub's zombified owner, Shaun discovers that the Winchester rifle above the bar is functional, which he had previously debated with Ed. Barbara reveals she was bitten and dies after giving Liz and Shaun's relationship her approval. David attempts to shoot Barbara, but Shaun stops him, accusing David of hating him and being in love with Liz. David denies this, but Dianne admits she knows it is true. Barbara becomes a zombie, forcing a distraught Shaun to shoot her, and further fighting with David ensues.

The zombies break through a window of the pub and pull David out, devouring him alive. In a foolish and senseless attempt to save the dead David, Dianne opens the doors to the pub and rushes into the horde of zombies using David's severed leg as a weapon. With the doors now open, zombies pour into the bar. The zombified Pete reappears in the horde and is shot by Shaun after biting Ed. Shaun, Liz, and Ed take cover behind the bar; Shaun sets the bar on fire with alcohol to serve as a barrier. The three take refuge in the cellar, where they realise they only have two bullets left. Shaun and Liz contemplate suicide while Ed volunteers to sacrifice himself. Upon discovering a small lift for kegs that opens onto the street, Shaun and Liz exit the pub while Ed buys them time by staying behind with the rifle. Yvonne arrives with the British Army, who gun down the zombies before taking Shaun and Liz to safety.

Six months later, normality has returned but the surviving zombies are now used for free unskilled labour and entertainment. Liz has moved in with Shaun, who keeps the now-zombified Ed chained up in his garden shed. Shaun plays video games in the shed with the somewhat-sentient Ed.

== Cast ==
- Simon Pegg as Shaun, a 29-year-old tech salesman
- Kate Ashfield as Liz, Shaun's girlfriend
- Lucy Davis as Dianne, Liz's housemate
- Nick Frost as Ed, Shaun's unemployed best friend
- Dylan Moran as David, Liz's housemate
- Bill Nighy as Philip, Shaun's stepfather and Barbara's husband
- Penelope Wilton as Barbara, Shaun's mother
- Jessica Stevenson as Yvonne, Shaun's friend
- Peter Serafinowicz as Pete, Shaun and Ed’s housemate
- Rafe Spall as Noel
- Martin Freeman as Declan
- Matt Lucas as Cousin Tom
- Tamsin Greig as Maggie

Television presenters and newsreaders Carol Barnes, Rob Butler, Krishnan Guru-Murthy, Vernon Kay, and Jeremy Thompson appear as themselves. In uncredited performances, Mark Gatiss and David Walliams provided the voices of news reporters. Edgar Wright, Joe Cornish, Garth Jennings, Mark Donovan and Michael Smiley, and Lauren Laverne appear as zombies. Chris Martin appears as a zombie, as well as himself with Jonny Buckland.

== Production ==
=== Development ===
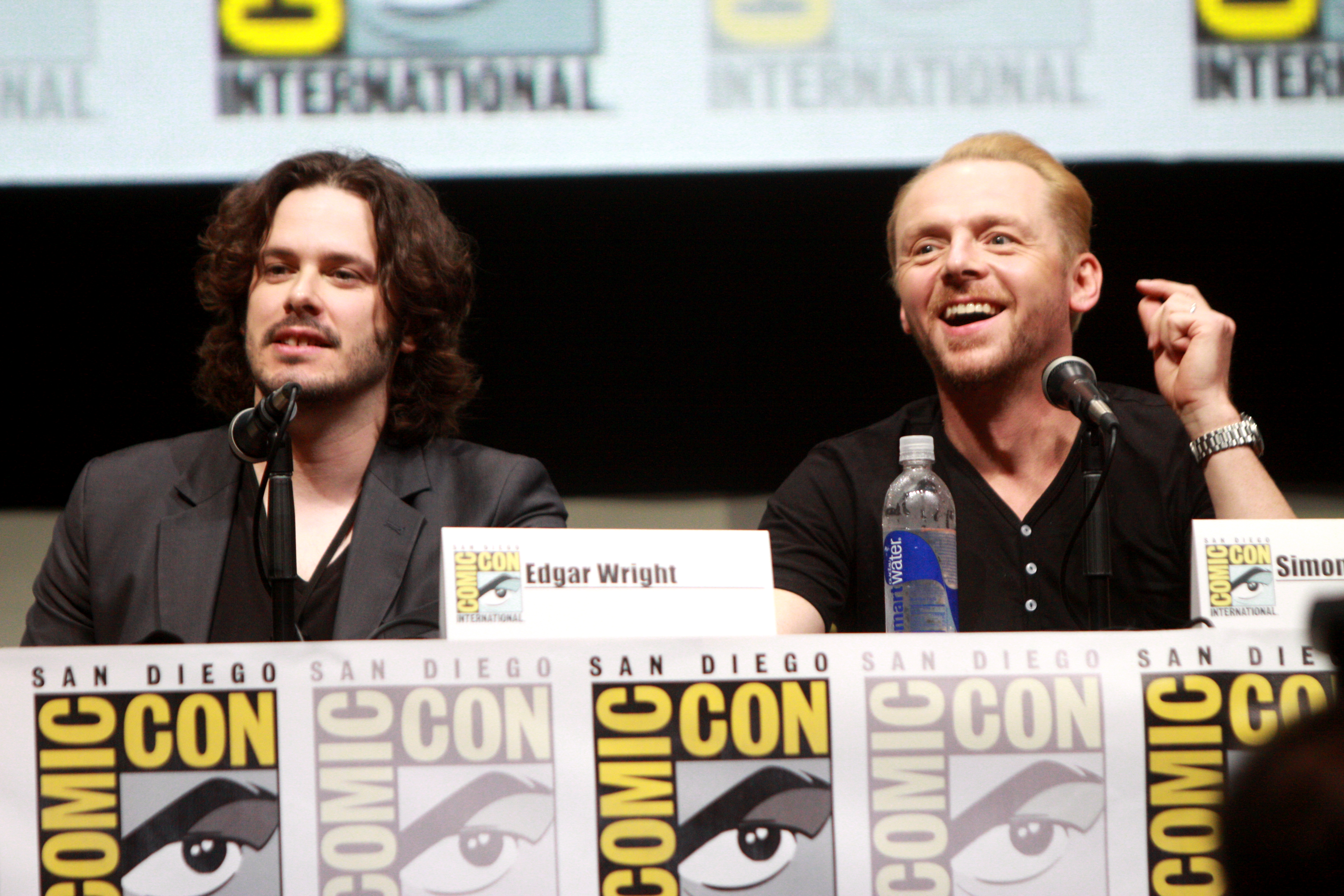
Shaun of the Dead writers Edgar Wright (left) and Simon Pegg (right) at the 2013 San Diego Comic-Con

One evening, I was round at Simon [Pegg] and his pal Nick Frost's flat for drinks when I said we should make our own zombie movie, a horror comedy. It would be from the point of view of two bit-players, two idiots who were the last to know what was going on, after waking up hungover on a Sunday morning.
– Edgar Wright, 2020

I could write whatever I would want to do or see. I think it would be great if there were more actor/writer and [writer]/director teams because I think the final piece would have a stronger identity [...] It would be difficult to say which I prefer, writing or acting. I guess acting is more fun, but it's certainly a luxury to be able to write for yourself.
– Simon Pegg, 2004

Shaun of the Dead was inspired by "Art", an episode of Simon Pegg and Edgar Wright's sitcom Spaced. Written by Pegg and Jessica Hynes and directed by Wright, the episode involves Pegg's character hallucinating a zombie invasion after playing the video game Resident Evil 2 while under the influence of amphetamine.

With a mutual appreciation for George A. Romero's Dead trilogy of zombie films, Pegg and Wright decided to write their own zombie film. In late 1999, they conceived and pitched the film to Film4, who took it on until their production budget was cut back. Despite this, Wright was still invested in the production and refused to take other television directing jobs until Shaun of the Dead was made, which left him in some debt for a while. According to Wright, other companies passed on it because "they weren't sure what the tone was and said it wasn't all that scary and not that funny. They didn't get it." After eighteen months, Working Title Films picked the project up, which Wright felt was ironic as the film mocks the classic British rom-coms that Working Title produces. The film was first announced at the 2002 Cannes Film Festival.

Wright has said that he came up with the film while riding in a cab with Pegg after the excitement of filming the zombie episode in Spaced, and while watching a horror film with both Pegg and Nick Frost. He began developing it in earnest after playing Resident Evil one late night himself and then going out in the early morning hours, wondering what a British person's reaction to a zombie apocalypse would be. He considered the lack of firearms typical of American zombie movies, and his experience of the dazed early morning walk to the shop turned into a scene in the film where Shaun does the same thing. Another influence from Wright's life came from how he missed the 2001 foot-and-mouth epidemic by simply not having paid attention to the news for a fortnight and turning his television on one day to see cattle being burnt, which left him confused. Due to this, Wright said "it's plausible that the world could be ending and these two guys could be the last to know" as they also skip over the news on television in the film. The idea of Shaun and Ed spending their time at the Winchester was also inspired by their actors' lives, as Pegg and Frost "always used to go to the same bar all the time" according to Wright, who had been trying to convince them not to.

Wright and Pegg wrote the screenplay in eight weeks. They were inspired by films including Night of the Living Dead (1968) and Dawn of the Dead (1978), as well as Raising Arizona (1987), Back to the Future (1985), Braindead (1992) and The Birds (1963). The actors met three weeks before filming began for read-throughs, where they also made changes to the script. According to Pegg, the script has a set structure, with certain lines and actions being repeated throughout the film, making improvisation harder. Only two scenes were improvised, which include when Ed begins to describe the people at the pub and when Shaun offers the group some peanuts. Pegg said that the screenplay played well into being an actor in the film because he "could write to [his] own strengths" and create his own wish fulfilment.

=== Casting ===
The film's cast features several British comedians, comedy actors and sitcom stars, most prominently from Spaced, Black Books and The Office, and co-stars other actors from the same shows. Cast members from them include Pegg, Frost, Stevenson, and Peter Serafinowicz. Frost met Pegg when he was working as a waiter and was brought aboard Spaced despite a lack of acting experience; Frost explained that Shaun and Ed have a dynamic similar to that of Pegg and himself in real life, as they had been living together for years.

Kate Winslet was approached to play Shaun's girlfriend, and met with Wright and Pegg to discuss the role, but she turned it down. Wright later confessed that he was relieved, saying "She's brilliant, but it was obvious that her fame would capsize the film in maybe a not useful way." The filmmakers originally approached Helen Mirren to play Shaun's mother, Barbara, which she turned down with a note that she would rather play other funnier characters. The role of Barbara ultimately went to Penelope Wilton, who was asked to take on the role because of her work in the 1984-89 sitcom Ever Decreasing Circles. Shaun's stepfather Philip is played by Bill Nighy, who accepted the role after Wright sent him an early script of the film to read.

==== Cameos and extras ====
Secondary roles and cameos include Martin Freeman, Tamsin Greig, Julia Deakin, Matt Lucas and Reece Shearsmith. The voices of Mark Gatiss and Julia Davis can be heard as radio news presenters; Trisha Goddard also makes a cameo appearance, hosting two fictionalised episodes of her real-life talk show Trisha. Many other comics and comic actors appear in cameos as zombies, including Rob Brydon, Paul Putner, Pamela Kempthorne, Joe Cornish, Antonia Campbell-Hughes, Mark Donovan and Michael Smiley. Coldplay members Chris Martin and Jonny Buckland also have cameo roles in the film; Martin is a close friend of Pegg, who is the godfather of Martin's daughter, and also contributed to the soundtrack by guest singing the cover of Buzzcocks' "Everybody's Happy Nowadays" with Ash. He does not appear as a zombie, but as himself in a charity drive.

Zombie extras were recruited from Spaced fan communities. Wright revealed in 2020 that "[the] zombies spent a week cooped up on set. They had to stand outside The Winchester, the pub where our heroes take refuge, banging on the windows and not doing much else really. When we eventually involved them properly, they had this electric energy: a pure, crazed hysteria." Originally, there were forty stunt performers hired to be the zombies, but when the production realised that they would need a lot more to fill the set pieces, many fans responded to the online call that auditions to select zombies were set up. There were over 150 zombie extras until local children saw the zombie makeup and wanted to be involved, leading to another fifty child zombies being added.

=== Filming ===
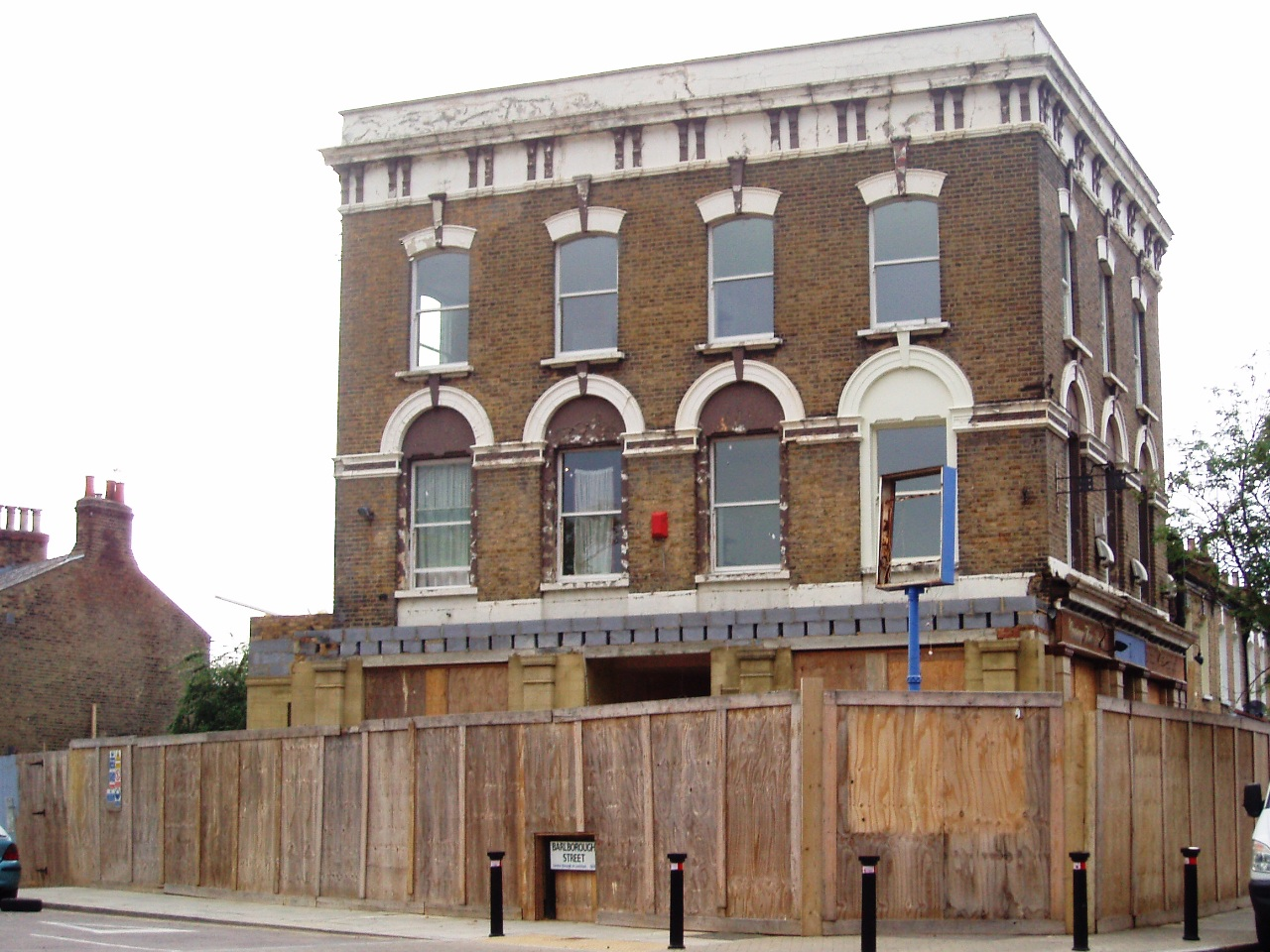
The Duke of Albany pub, used for exterior shots of the Winchester (image taken in 2008, immediately prior to conversion to flats).

The film was shot over nine weeks in London, both on location and at Ealing Studios, between May and July 2003. Wright uses in-camera transitions, typical to his style, to enable powerful visual storytelling. Pegg also commented on the use of a magical realism style, which he says is part of Wright's direction.

Many exterior shots were filmed in and around the North London areas of Crouch End (where the film is set), Highgate, Finsbury Park and East Finchley. The electrical appliance shop that Shaun works at is a real shop located in North Finchley. The scenes filmed in and around the Winchester pub were shot at the Duke of Albany pub in New Cross, South London. The three-storey Victorian pub was closed and turned into flats in 2008.

=== Music ===
The film score by Pete Woodhead and Daniel Mudford is a pastiche of Italian zombie film soundtracks by Goblin and Fabio Frizzi. It also uses many musical cues from the original Dawn of the Dead that were originally taken by George A. Romero from the De Wolfe production music library. A friend of the assistant editor on the film had been compiling music library tracks from zombie films, making finding some music for the film much easier. Before production began on the film, Wright and Pegg had created a mixtape of songs they wanted to use. The Goblin music, though, was used as a temp track by Wright in editing; he liked the feel of it so much they decided to get the clearance to use it.

Bobby Olivier of Billboard attributes the initial rebirth of Queen's "Don't Stop Me Now" to its appearance in the film, which "introduced it to a new generation of listeners", saying: "Perhaps the most famous scene from Shaun of the Dead features "Don't Stop Me Now" which blares from a pub jukebox while stars Simon Pegg, Nick Frost, and Kate Ashfield bash a zombie with pool cues to the song's hurtling beat". The moment had been Wright's idea, as he loves Queen and "had the idea of playing Don't Stop Me Now – one of the most positive, exciting, happy tunes ever – over a scene of extreme violence". Pegg explained that the fight in the pub was choreographed to the song even before it had been cleared to be used in the film, so they wrote to Brian May and begged to use it.

The other choreographed sequence, near the start of the film, used different music than that which it had been set to. The original was a Cornelius song, and had been the track written in for the scene from the screenplay. Wright then heard the song used in the film, "The Blue Wrath" by I Monster, when editing and felt that it worked better. The tempo of both songs is the same, so the new song fitted the original choreography.

== Release ==
The film was distributed by Universal Pictures—through United International Pictures (UIP)— in the United Kingdom (UK) and Rogue Pictures—through Focus Features— in the United States and Canada, as well as other international markets. However, Universal also distributed Zack Snyder's remake of Dawn of the Dead at that time, and only took on Shaun of the Dead after setting the condition that they would market and release it two weeks after the release of Snyder's film.

=== Marketing ===
UIP created a heavy targeted marketing strategy in the UK, including hiring actors to play zombies and dropping them around London to create disruption shortly before the film's release. ZenithOptimedia ran this part of the campaign; their head said that "It has to be the most powerful way to communicate what Shaun of the Dead is all about".

Beyond traditional print advertising, posters were also placed in the London Underground. As the poster depicted Shaun crammed tightly against train windows surrounded by zombies, the company chose to buy up poster spaces that "would give the impression to anyone walking through the tunnels between platforms that the zombie carriages were on the tracks"; this is a tactic that UIP had not done before, but the creative angle of the posters' positioning naturally lent itself to such a move. A similar tactic was used with digital posters for the film at an international football match between England and Sweden; less-restrictive advertising laws in Sweden, where the game was held, meant that UIP had "hoardings incorporating flailing zombie-like arms", which would not have been permitted in England.

=== Home media ===
The film was released on VHS and DVD shortly after its theatrical run in the US, with a VHS and DVD release on 6 September 2004 in the UK and around December 2004 in the US, in widescreen-only for both formats. Features included several audio commentaries, EPK featurettes about the film's production, pre-production video diaries and concept videos, photo galleries, bloopers, and more. The film also saw release on the HD DVD format in 2007 and UMD, with a Blu-ray Disc release following in 2009.

The Blu-ray release had high-definition visuals and a 5.1 surround sound audio mix. Special features include four audio commentaries, the DVD features, and U-Control features giving access to "storyboards, missing bits, and of course the Zomb-O-Meter trivia track".

=== Comic adaptations and other media ===
Pegg and Wright scripted a one-off tie-in comic strip for the British comic magazine 2000 AD titled "There's Something About Mary". Set the day before the zombie outbreak, the strip follows and expands on the character of Mary, who appears briefly in the introductory credits and is the first zombie whom Shaun and Ed are aware of; the strip details how she became a zombie. The strip was made available on the DVD release of Shaun, along with two other strips that wrapped up plotholes in the film, like how Dianne escaped and survived the Winchester incident and Ed's fate after taking refuge in the pub's basement. The comics, which feature Pegg and Wright's voices on the DVD and are in black and white, were drawn by Oscar Wright, a graphic artist and Edgar Wright's brother. In 2005, IDW Publishing released a four-issue adaptation written by Chris Ryall (with input from Edgar Wright & Simon Pegg) and drawn by Zack Howard. The comic also contains scenes that were left out of the film.

In 2006, the National Entertainment Collectibles Association announced that it would produce action figures based on the film. Upper Deck Entertainment released a card for the popular World of Warcraft TCG in 2007, an ally named "Shawn of the Dead", with the power of bringing back allies from the enemy graveyard. Pegg and Frost reprised their roles as Shaun and Ed for a public service announcement video, The Plan, which was released on 19 March 2020 on YouTube. In the video, Shaun and Ed share advice about the ongoing COVID-19 pandemic, with the former urging the latter to follow National Health Service guidelines, stay home and avoid the pub.

== Cultural references ==
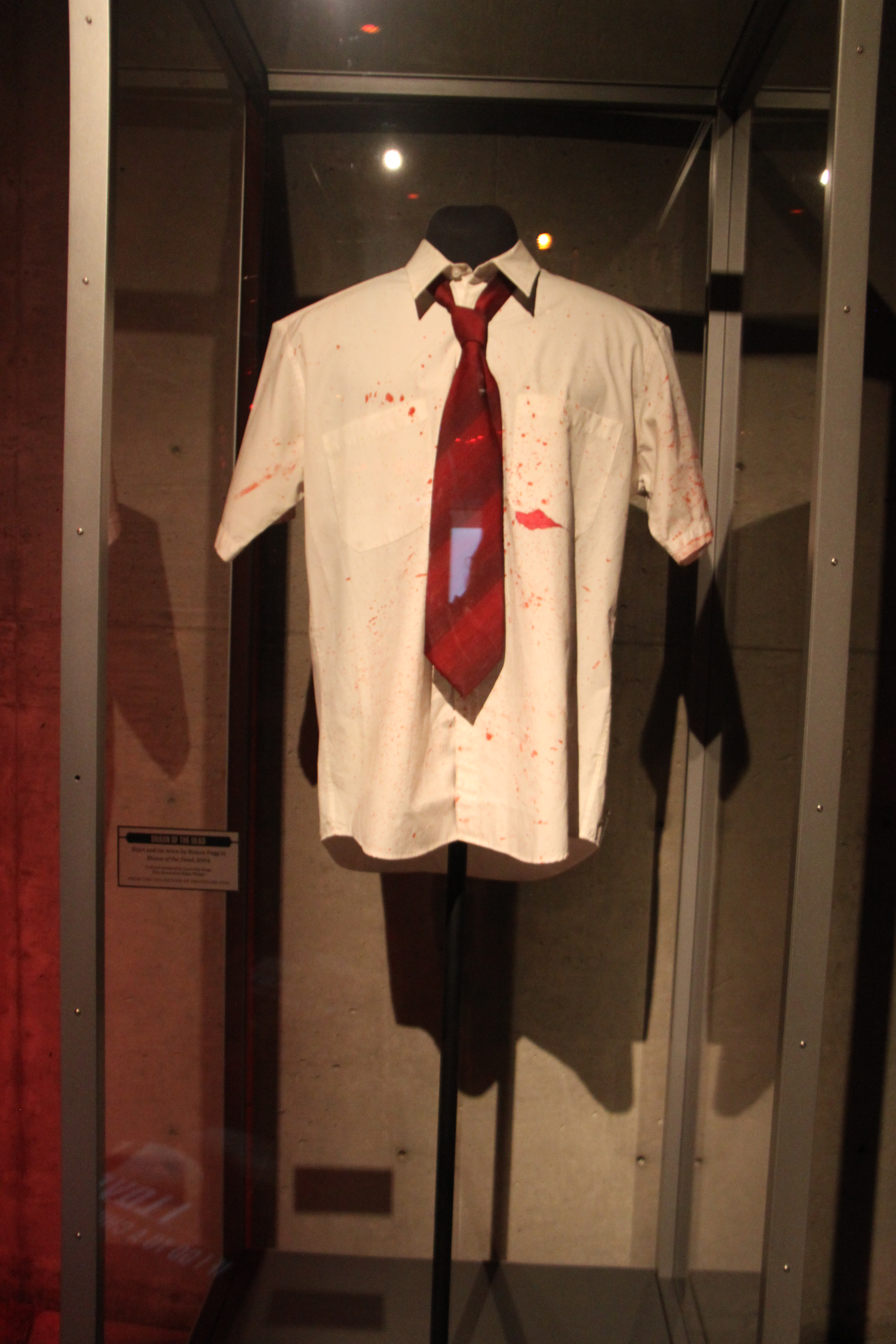
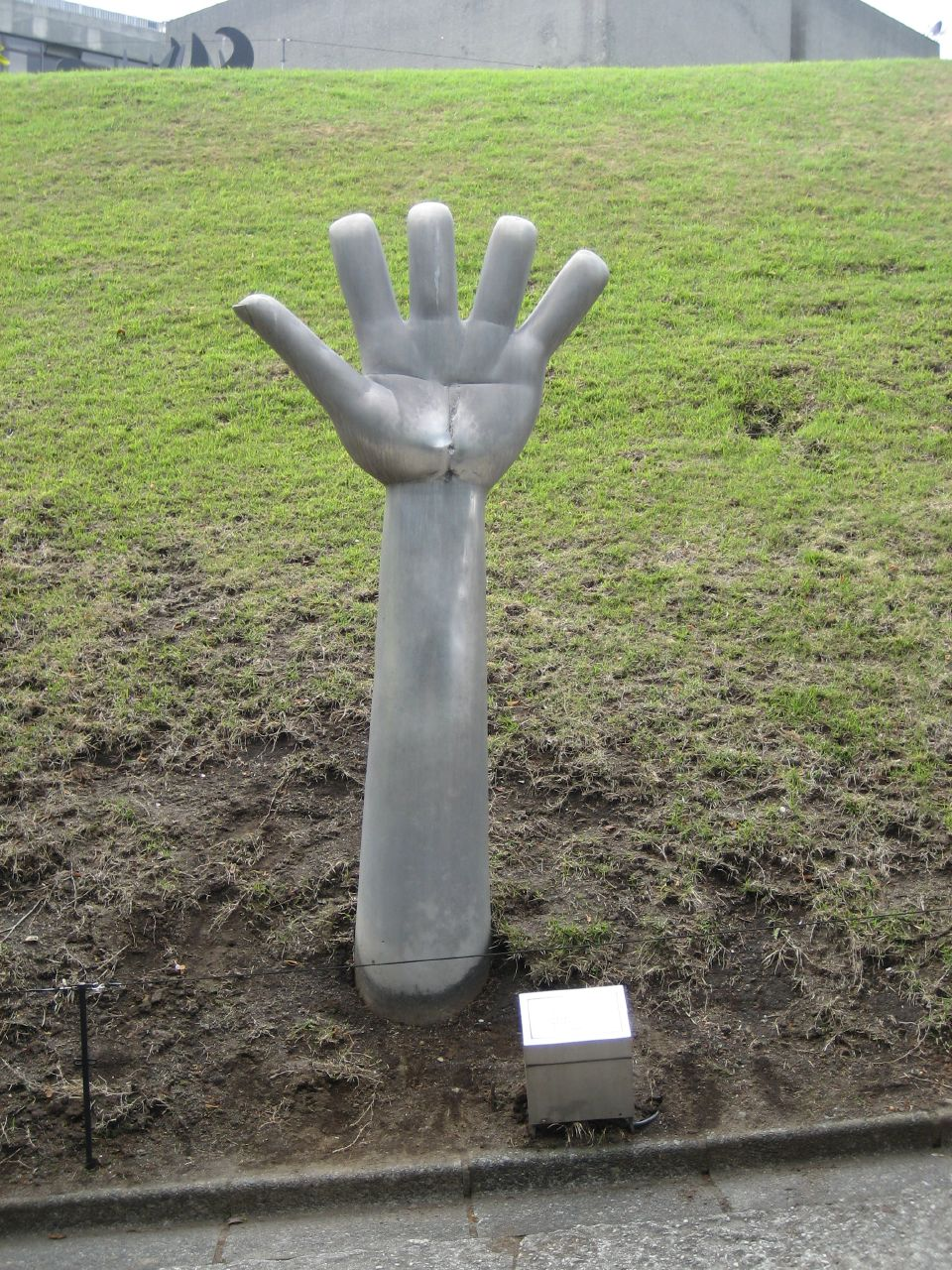
Left: Shaun's white shirt and red tie at the Museum of Pop Culture in Seattle.
Right: Shaun of the Dead sculpture at the Hakone Open-Air Museum.

Shaun of the Dead contains many references to Romero's films Night of the Living Dead, Dawn of the Dead and particularly Day of the Dead. The name Shaun of the Dead is a pun on Dawn of the Dead. A theoretical sequel, From Dusk Till Shaun, was discussed by Wright and Pegg, referencing From Dusk till Dawn, as was a parallel sequel starring Stevenson called Yvonne of the Dead. A poster was made for From Dusk Till Shaun to feature in the alternate universe Times Square in the 2018 animated Sony Pictures Marvel Comics film Spider-Man: Into the Spider-Verse; a co-director of this film, Rodney Rothman, had reached out to Wright to ask for a film suggestion that he could have theoretically made in the alternate universe.

Other zombie film references include one to 28 Days Later, made during the ending scene when Shaun and Liz are watching television and a news report mentions the idea of "raging infected monkeys" – in 28 Days Later the rage virus was started by monkeys in a laboratory – and another to Italian gore director Lucio Fulci with the restaurant called "Fulci's". The film was the first instalment of Wright and Pegg's Three Flavours Cornetto trilogy, in which each film makes a passing reference to a different flavour of Cornetto ice cream; Shaun of the Dead features red strawberry-flavoured ice cream, signifying the film's bloody and gory elements. The Cornetto was included as Ed's hangover cure because it is Wright's actual hangover cure.

Wright and Pegg had contacted various artists to ask for the use of their records in the scene where Shaun and Ed throw LPs at a zombie to defend themselves. While some artists never got back, Wright said that "Sade was the coolest. She said we could trash Diamond Life without hesitation". Wright would later include a Sade song in the soundtrack of his 2010 film Scott Pilgrim vs. the World – the Beachwood Sparks version of "By Your Side". It was on an original list of songs for the Scott Pilgrim graphic novel, and Wright joked that "he owed Sade some publishing money" after destroying the album in Shaun of the Dead. Of the moment, Pegg said that they "love using Sade as a weapon", noting that she was one of only two artists who gave permission to show cover art in the scene (the other being New Order).

Besides the short The Plan being made during the COVID-19 pandemic, the film saw renewed interest in 2020 as an Internet meme. It began trending on Twitter because the film's poster, which showed zombies pressed up against door windows, bears a striking resemblance to a photojournalist's image of protesters in Ohio at the Statehouse demanding lockdown be lifted. The situation was also described as "reminiscent of some of the scenes towards the end of the movie". The photojournalist was Joshua A. Bickel, who said that he "thought the windows and door were an interesting compositional element", Dawn of the Dead prosthetist Tom Savini said it reminds him of Shaun of the Dead because both use the pressed-up-against-glass horror trope.

The film also has a tribute with a zombie hand sculpture at the Hakone Museum in Japan, where it is a cult hit despite not having a theatrical release in the country until March 2019, 15 years after it was first released.

Films that have been based on or inspired by Shaun of the Dead include Juan of the Dead, Hsien of the Dead, and Shed of the Dead.

== Analysis ==
Film scholar Kyle Bishop, Literature scholar and leading zombie film researcher Peter Dendle, and Sci-Fi scholar Gerry Canavan all comment on Shaun of the Dead as part of a large body of zombie narratives produced in the wake of 9/11. Bishop explained that the "renaissance of the subgenre reveals a connection between zombie cinema and post-9/11 cultural consciousness", because "horror films function as barometers of society's anxieties, and zombie movies represent the inescapable realities of unnatural death while presenting a grim view of the modern apocalypse". He finds that the subgenre of zombie films "can shock and terrify a population that has become numb to other horror subgenres", with Dendle similarly assessing that "the possibility of wide-scale destruction and devastation which 9/11 brought once again into the communal consciousness found a ready narrative expression in the zombie apocalypses which over thirty years had honed images of desperation subsistence and amoral survivalism to a fine edge".

Dirk Eitzen also examined the film in depth as an example of how comedy is made in film, particularly how interpretive humour and satire are used. For instance, when Shaun slips and falls in the shop in the opening sequence, per Eitzen's explanation, it is funny on several levels. Falling is funny; not noticing the zombie apocalypse is funny; the social satire that contrasts Shaun's mindless behaviour with the mindless zombies is funny; and the self-reference to where Shaun had slipped on a curb earlier in the sequence is funny, too. Media scholar Lindsey Decker wrote on how the film created comedy through transnational generic hybridisation, taking cues from American zombie films as well as "British comedic practices from WWII-era Ealing comedies, television two-man comedy teams and the Monty Python sketch troupe". In this use of British comedy within an American genre, it also serves as commentary on British-American relations in the film industry.

Multiple chapters of the 2016 book The Laughing Dead: The Horror-Comedy Film from Bride of Frankenstein to Zombieland are devoted to analysing aspects of Shaun of the Dead. Steven Webley's chapter looks at the use of the Uncanny in the film, while Shelley S. Rees' chapter discusses the film's Marxist implications and the transgressive nature of zombies and zombie films in terms of relationships and sexuality. Comparatively, Kathryn A. Cady and Thomas Oates write in their article 'Family Splatters: Rescuing Heteronormativity from the Zombie Apocalypse' that the film "imagines a single-generation heteronormative family as the outcome of zombie invasion".

Beyond film studies, a Bayesian mathematical model using Markov chain Monte Carlo methods was performed on examples of epidemic progression by Caitlyn Witkowski and Brian Blais in 2013. As an example of how such modelling could be applied to infectious disease control, Witkowski and Blais took examples of zombie apocalypses in Romero's original Dead trilogy and Shaun of the Dead to demonstrate disease dynamics.

== Reception ==
=== Box office ===
In the UK (all figures in US$), Shaun of the Dead grossed $3.0 million at the box office in its opening weekend, being shown in 367 cinemas and starting a run of five consecutive weekends in the UK top 10. In the United States and Canada, it grossed $3.3 million in its opening weekend, across 607 theatres, starting a run of three consecutive weekends in the US-Canada Top 10. Including brief re-releases in 2020 and 2022, Shaun of the Dead grossed $13.5 million in the United States and Canada, and $25.1 million in other territories, for a worldwide total of $38.7 million, against a budget of $6 million.

=== Critical response ===
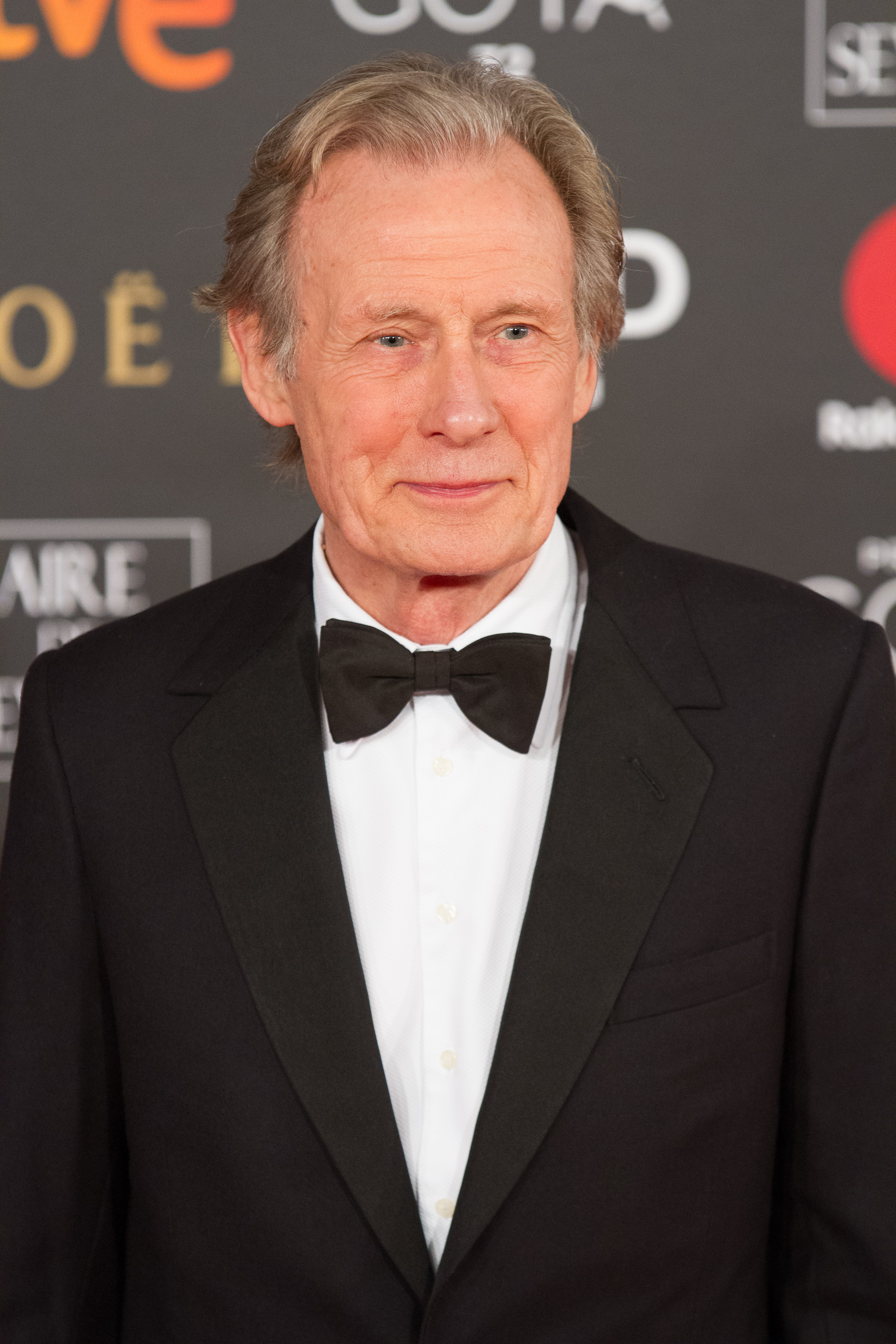
Bill Nighy was praised for his role as Shaun's stepfather Philip.

Shaun of the Dead received critical acclaim. On the review aggregator website Rotten Tomatoes, 92% of 220 critics' reviews are positive, with an average rating of 7.8/10. The website's consensus reads: "Shaun of the Dead cleverly balances scares and witty satire, making for a bloody good zombie movie with loads of wit."Metacritic, which uses a weighted average, assigned the film a score of 76 out of 100, based on 34 critics, indicating "generally favorable" reviews.

Nev Pierce, reviewing the film for the BBC, called it a "side-splitting, head-smashing, gloriously gory horror comedy" that will "amuse casual viewers and delight genre fans". Peter Bradshaw gave it four stars out of five, saying it "boasts a script crammed with real gags" and is "pacily directed [and] nicely acted". Wendy Ide for Screen Daily wrote that the film "proves that the move from small to big screen comedy does not always end in artistic failure", saying that the film stays true to Pegg and Wright's style but also makes use of comedy more accessible to the British masses than that of Spaced.

Pierce wrote that the choice of weapons was amusing, and he suggested that the film's real strength was the characterisation of the unhappy leads. He felt that the climax at the pub was lacking in horror and comedy compared to the rest of the film. Like Pierce, Ide felt that there is "a convincing emotional depth" despite the comedy; she similarly noted that the second half was slower but chalked this up to being darker in tone at the climax. She praised the special effects make-up and prosthetics created by Stuart Conran. Keith Phipps of The A.V. Club enjoyed the record-throwing scene, citing it as an example of where the film "doesn't mind putting in extra work for its laughs", as it comes off funnier with Shaun and Ed debating which records they sacrifice rather than throwing indiscriminately. He found Wright's technical skills to be impressive, adding that Wright left the spotlight to the performances rather than the camerawork, but found the finale to be disappointingly played straight.

Both the American critics Roger Ebert and Robert K. Elder said that the film brought something more to the zombie genre. Ebert wrote that he was "by now more or less exhausted by the cinematic possibilities of killing [zombies]", and so he was glad for what Shaun of the Dead brought to the table outside of this, writing that "instead of focusing on the Undead and trying to get the laughs there, it treats the living characters as sitcom regulars whose conflicts and arguments keep getting interrupted by annoying flesh-eaters". Elder agreed that by its release the zombie film had "ambled its course", but thought that "Shaun of the Dead stands on its own, a romantic comedy crossed with a quarter-life crisis drama–just played against a background horde of brain-hungry, decomposing undead". B. Alan Orange of MovieWeb wrote that "The British Zombie experience 'is' different enough to change the outlook of a whole genre".

Of the cast, Ebert particularly praised Nighy, writing that "there's something endearing about his response ["I ran it under a cold tap"] when he is bitten by a zombie". Elder described Nighy as the film's scene stealer.

Peter Travers also gave the film three out of four stars and praised Pegg: "[he] makes you root for Shaun, even when he’s slacking with Ed [...], neglecting Liz and battling with his mum". Phipps' take on Shaun was that "Pegg gives his hero a defeated look that slowly melts away as the crisis at last gives him a chance to become a man of action".

=== Accolades ===
Year	Award	Category	Recipients	Result	Notes
2004	British Independent Film Awards	Best British Independent Film	Shaun of the Dead	Nominated	
2004	British Independent Film Awards	Best Screenplay	Edgar Wright and Simon Pegg	Won	
2004	British Independent Film Awards	Most Promising Newcomer	Nick Frost	Nominated	
2005	Online Film Critics Society	Best Original Screenplay	Edgar Wright and Simon Pegg	Nominated	
2005	Evening Standard British Film Awards	Peter Sellers Award for Comedy	Simon Pegg	Won	
2005	London Film Critics' Circle Awards	British Film of the Year	Shaun of the Dead	Nominated	
2005	London Film Critics' Circle Awards	Screenwriter(s) of the Year	Edgar Wright and Simon Pegg	Nominated	
2005	British Academy Film Awards	Outstanding British Film	Shaun of the Dead	Nominated	
2005	British Academy Film Awards	Outstanding Debut by a British Writer, Director or Producer	Nira Park	Nominated	As producer
2005	British Academy Film Awards	BAFTA Interactive Award	Shaun of the Dead	Nominated	As a DVD release
2005	Empire Awards	Best British Film	Shaun of the Dead	Won	
2005	Empire Awards	Best British Director	Edgar Wright	Nominated	
2005	Empire Awards	Best British Actor	Simon Pegg	Nominated	
2005	Empire Awards	Best British Actress	Kate Ashfield	Nominated	
2005	Empire Awards	Scene of the Year	The records and zombies scene	Nominated	
2005	Saturn Awards	Best Horror Film	Shaun of the Dead	Won	
2005	Bram Stoker Awards	Best Screenplay	Edgar Wright and Simon Pegg	Won	Tied with Eternal Sunshine of the Spotless Mind

=== Best-of lists and appraisal ===
In 2004, Total Film magazine named Shaun of the Dead the 49th greatest British film of all time. In 2006, it was rated as the third greatest comedy film of all time in the Channel 4 list of the 50 Greatest Comedy Films, with only Monty Python's Life of Brian and Airplane! ranked higher. In 2007, Stylus Magazine named it the ninth-greatest zombie film ever made. In 2007, Time named it one of the 25 best horror films, calling the film "spooky, silly and smart-smart-smart" and complimenting its director: "Wright, who'd be a director to watch in any genre, plays world-class games with the camera and the viewer's expectations of what's supposed to happen in a scare film". Bloody Disgusting ranked the film second in their list of the 'Top 20 Horror Films of the Decade', with the article saying "Shaun of the Dead isn't just the best horror-comedy of the decade – it's quite possibly the best horror-comedy ever made". In December 2009, Now deemed Shaun of the Dead the best film of the decade. In March 2011, the film was voted by BBC Radio 1 and BBC Radio 1Xtra listeners as their second favourite film of all time. Frank Darabont's The Shawshank Redemption came in first place. In 2008, Empire magazine named it as one of the Top 500 films, for which a new release poster was made for the film, and in 2016 Empire ranked it 6th on their list of the 100 best British films, with their entry stating, "it's a masterpiece, right up there with Evil Dead II as one of the finest horror/comedies ever made". Rotten Tomatoes lists the film on its 100 Best Zombie Movies, Ranked by Tomatometer.

George A. Romero first saw the film after Wright called to ask him what he thought of it; he watched it in a Florida cinema by himself and called them to give his approval. He was so impressed with Pegg and Wright's work that he asked them to make cameos in his 2005 film Land of the Dead; both Pegg and Wright insisted on being zombies rather than the slightly more noticeable roles that were initially offered. Pegg and Frost also reprised their roles (in animation) as Shaun and Ed in the Phineas and Ferb Halloween special "Night of the Living Pharmacists" in October 2014. Quentin Tarantino described the film as one of his top twenty favourite films made since 1992, and horror novelist Stephen King described it as "a '10' on the fun meter and destined to be a cult classic". The film has garnered a cult following, generally among "millennial comedy and horror lovers alike".

In 2021, members of Writers Guild of America West (WGAW) and Writers Guild of America, East (WGAE) voted its screenplay 77th in WGA’s 101 Greatest Screenplays of the 21st Century (so far). In 2025, it was one of the films voted for the "Readers' Choice" edition of The New York Times' list of "The 100 Best Movies of the 21st Century," finishing at number 158.

== See also ==
- List of cult films
