= The Fantastic Plastic Machine (album) =

Studio album by Fantastic Plastic Machine
- Released: October 10, 1997
- Genre: Shibuya-kei; big beat; electronica
- Length: 49:23
- Label: Readymade
- Producer: Tomoyuki Tanaka; Takeo Sasada; Yukihiro Fukitomi

Fantastic Plastic Machine chronology
The Fantastic Plastic Machine (1997)	Summer Review EP (1998)

Singles from The Fantastic Plastic Machine
- 1. "L'Aventure fantastique" Released: August 30, 1997

The Fantastic Plastic Machine is the debut studio album by Japanese musician Fantastic Plastic Machine. It was released on October 10, 1997, by Readymade Records. The album was subsequently released in Germany on April 24, 1998, by Bungalow Records and in the United States on September 15, 1998, by Emperor Norton Records.

The album draws influence and inspiration from music styles—including baroque pop, bossa nova, beat, and Europop, as well as dance music roots. The album cover art was illustrated by French-Armenian cartoonist and illustrator Edmond Kiraz.

== Critical reception ==
Professional ratings
Review scores
Source	Rating
AllMusic	4.5/5 stars

Steve Huey of AllMusic described The Fantastic Plastic Machine as "a delightful, infectious album that's not only hooky as all get-out, but also rewards repeated listening", deeming it "one of the best albums to come out of the Japanese club-pop movement".

In 2007, Rolling Stone Japan placed The Fantastic Plastic Machine at number 67 on its list of the "100 Greatest Japanese Rock Albums of All Time". In 2011, the album was included in LA Weekly's "beginner's guide" to Shibuya-kei music. Tokyo Weekender writer Ed Cunningham later cited it as a "groundbreaking" Shibuya-kei release, noting: "Some post-Shibuya-kei artists would follow in the footsteps of the guitar-driven indie pop of Flipper's Guitar, but many more significant acts, in genres such as picopop and electropop, would expand upon the electronica initiated by [Fantastic Plastic Machine]."

== Track listing ==
No.	Title	Writer(s)	Length
1.	"Bon Voyage"	Tomoyuki Tanaka	0:42
2.	"L'Aventure fantastique"	Tanaka; Takeo Sasada	3:03
3.	"Steppin' Out"	Joe Jackson	5:30
4.	"Bachelor Pad" (F.P.M. edit)	Tanaka; Richard Cameron	4:47
5.	"Fantastic Plastic World"	Tanaka; Laila France; Mikado Koyanagi	5:51
6.	"Dear Mr. Salesman"	Tanaka; Sasada; Tetsushi Hiruma; Toshiyuki Yasuda	4:14
7.	"Allen Ginsberg"	Tanaka; Yasuaki Shimizu	3:58
8.	"First Class '77"	Tanaka; Yoshinori Sunahara	6:44
9.	"Philter (In viaggio attraverso l'Australia)"	Piero Piccioni	5:19
10.	"Please, Stop!"	Tanaka; Yukihiro Fukutomi	4:41
11.	"Pura saudade (Nova bossa nova)"	Tanaka; Sasada; Pat Cerqueira	4:34
Total length:			49:23

German CD edition
No.	Title	Writer(s)	Length
1.	"Bon Voyage"	Tanaka	0:42
2.	"L'Aventure fantastique"	Tanaka; Sasada	3:03
3.	"Steppin' Out"	Jackson	5:30
4.	"Bachelor Pad" (F.P.M. edit)	Tanaka; Cameron	4:47
5.	"Fantastic Plastic World (Voice 'n' Baroque)"	Tanaka; France; Koyanagi	5:51
6.	"Dear Mr. Salesman"	Tanaka; Sasada; Hiruma; Yasuda	4:14
7.	"Allen Ginsberg"	Tanaka; Shimizu	3:58
8.	"First Class '77"	Tanaka; Sunahara	6:44
9.	"Philter (In viaggio attraverso l'Australia)" (vocal version)	Piccioni	5:50
10.	"Please, Stop!"	Tanaka; Fukutomi	4:41
11.	"Pura saudade (Nova bossa nova)"	Tanaka; Sasada; Cerqueira	4:34
12.	"L'Aventure fantastique (Recycled Soft Rock)"	Tanaka; Sasada	4:49
13.	"Pura saudade (Nova bossa nova) (Laxmikant)"	Tanaka; Sasada; Cerqueira	6:32
Total length:			61:15

The German LP edition (total length: 45:25) follows the track order of the original Japanese edition, but substitutes "Fantastic Plastic World" with "Fantastic Plastic World (Voice 'n' Baroque)" and omits "Allen Ginsberg".

US edition
No.	Title	Writer(s)	Length
1.	"Bon Voyage"	Tanaka	0:42
2.	"L'Aventure fantastique"	Tanaka; Sasada	3:03
3.	"Dear Mr. Salesman"	Tanaka; Sasada; Hiruma; Yasuda	4:14
4.	"Bachelor Pad" (F.P.M. edit)	Tanaka; Cameron	4:47
5.	"Fantastic Plastic World (Voice 'n' Baroque)"	Tanaka; France; Koyanagi	5:51
6.	"Steppin' Out"	Jackson	5:30
7.	"Allen Ginsberg"	Tanaka; Shimizu	3:58
8.	"First Class '77"	Tanaka; Sunahara	6:44
9.	"Philter (In viaggio attraverso l'Australia)"	Piccioni	5:19
10.	"Please, Stop!"	Tanaka; Fukutomi	4:41
11.	"Pura saudade (Nova bossa nova)"	Tanaka; Sasada; Cerqueira	4:34
12.	"Dear Mr. Salesman (Remix 4 Ya by DJ Me DJ You)"	Tanaka; Sasada; Hiruma; Yasuda	3:45
13.	"Pura Saudade" (Optiganally mix)	Tanaka; Sasada; Cerqueira	5:02
Total length:			58:10
