= Spaced =

British TV sitcom (1999–2001)

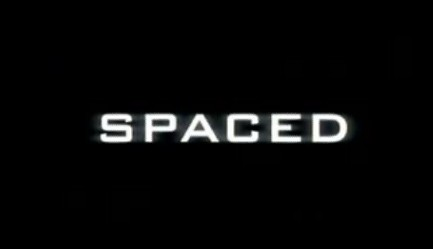
- Genre: Sitcom; Satire; Surreal humour; Screwball comedy
- Created by: Jessica Stevenson; Simon Pegg
- Written by: Jessica Stevenson; Simon Pegg
- Directed by: Edgar Wright
- Starring: Jessica Stevenson; Simon Pegg; Julia Deakin; Nick Frost; Mark Heap; Katy Carmichael
- Country of origin: United Kingdom
- Original language: English
- No. of series: 2
- No. of episodes: 14

Production
- Executive producers: Humphrey Barclay; Tony Orsten
- Producers: Gareth Edwards; Nira Park
- Editors: Chris Dickens; Paul Machliss
- Camera setup: Single-camera
- Running time: 25 minutes
- Production companies: London Weekend Television; Paramount Comedy Channel

Original release
- Network: Channel 4
- Release: 24 September 1999 – 13 April 2001

Spaced is a British television sitcom created, written by and starring Simon Pegg and Jessica Stevenson, and directed by Edgar Wright. The show follows Daisy Steiner and Tim Bisley, two Londoners in their twenties who, despite having only just met, decide to move into a flat offered for a 'professional couple' after Daisy gives up on squatting and Tim is kicked out by his ex-girlfriend. Supporting roles include Nick Frost as Tim's best friend Mike, Katy Carmichael as Daisy's best friend Twist, Mark Heap as lodger Brian who lives downstairs and Julia Deakin as landlady Marsha.

The first series of the show, comprising seven episodes, premiered in the UK on Channel 4 on 24 September 1999, and the second and final series, also consisting of seven episodes, started on 23 February 2001 and concluded on 13 April.

Both series were nominated for the BAFTA TV Award for Best Situation Comedy. Spaced has been cited as one of one of the best television series of all time.

== Plot ==
Daisy Steiner and Tim Bisley are two London based twenty-somethings who meet by chance in a café while both are flat-hunting. Despite barely knowing each other, they conspire to pose as a young professional couple in order to meet the requisites of an advertisement for a relatively cheap flat in the distinctive building at 23 Meteor Street, Tufnell Park, owned by resident landlady Marsha Klein. Also in the building is Brian Topp, an eccentric conceptual artist who lives and works on his various pieces in the ground-floor flat. Frequent visitors are Daisy's best friend Twist Morgan and Tim's best friend Mike Watt. The latter ends up becoming a lodger after Marsha's daughter Amber "flies the nest".

The series largely concerns the surreal and awkward adventures of Tim and Daisy as they navigate through life, come to terms with affairs of the heart, and try to figure out new and largely unproductive ways of killing time. They repeatedly clarify that they are not a couple to everyone but Marsha, but despite this, romantic tension develops between them, particularly during the second series.

== Characters ==
Cast:

- Simon Pegg as Tim Bisley
- Jessica Stevenson as Daisy Steiner
- Nick Frost as Mike Watt
- Katy Carmichael as Twist Morgan
- Mark Heap as Brian Topp
- Julia Deakin as Marsha Klein
- Bill Bailey as Bilbo
- Peter Serafinowicz as Duane Benzie
- Michael Smiley as Tyres O'Flaherty
- Aida as Colin, a Miniature Schnauzer

== Production ==
The show has a distinctive style inspired by cinema and sitcoms, with Edgar Wright citing The Simpsons, The Young Ones and the "whimsical dream sequences" of The Fall and Rise of Reginald Perrin as influences. It was shot with a single camera. In addition to borrowing liberally from the visual language of film it has particular stylistic mannerisms, such as the recurring device of scene changes occurring in the middle of a pan. The series' atmosphere is also established by the use of a particular flavour of contemporary dance music on its soundtrack.

Northern Exposure's frequent use of fantasy sequences was "one of the key influences" in the creation of the show, and Pegg and Stevenson pitched the show to LWT as "a cross between The Simpsons, The X-Files and Northern Exposure."

The series is dense with references to popular culture, including but not limited to science fiction and horror films, comic books, and video games. The Series 2 DVD release introduced the "Homage-o-meter", an alternative set of subtitles listing every reference and homage; the "Definitive Collectors Edition" boxed set introduced a similar subtitle track for Series 1. 2000 AD artists Jim Murray and Jason Brashill provided the artwork for Tim's comic The Bear, as well as other incidental artwork for the show. Tim's boss Bilbo wears a 2000 AD comic T-shirt whilst lecturing Tim about Star Wars: Episode I – The Phantom Menace.

The series is also noted for its regular recreational drug use references, from its title onwards. Tim and Daisy smoke cannabis on a number of occasions, one episode centring on its use. Tim and Mike take speed on one occasion, and it is implied that Tim, Mike, Daisy, Twist and Brian take ecstasy while clubbing.

== Music ==
Individual tracks that were particularly featured in an episode included "Is You Is or Is You Ain't My Baby?" by Louis Jordan, "Smash It" by Fuzz Townshend, and "The Staunton Lick" by Lemon Jelly. A Guy Pratt remix of the A-Team theme song, featured at the conclusion of "Epiphanies", was a fan favourite, but was never made commercially available.

In 2001, a soundtrack to the first series was released in tandem with the first series' release on DVD and videotape. A second soundtrack was not released, although the series' official fan website has an episode-by-episode list of music featured in the second series.

== Episodes ==
=== Series 1 (1999) ===
No. overall	No. in series	Title	Directed by	Written by	Original release date
1	1	"Beginnings"	Edgar Wright	Simon Pegg & Jessica Stevenson	24 September 1999
Daisy Steiner is living in a squat, and Tim Bisley is homeless after breaking up with his girlfriend. The two meet in a cafe and form a friendship as they search for accommodation. When they notice a listing for a flat they like but which is for a 'professional couple' only, they decide to pass themselves off as a long term couple in order to fool Marsha Klein, their prospective landlady.
2	2	"Gatherings"	Edgar Wright	Simon Pegg & Jessica Stevenson	1 October 1999
Daisy plans a housewarming party to avoid doing any work. Guests include her friend Twist Morgan, Marsha, Tim's territorial army agent friend Mike Watt and Brian Topp who lives in the same building. Marsha's daughter Amber throws a separate party upstairs, to which all the guests eventually go.
3	3	"Art"	Edgar Wright	Simon Pegg & Jessica Stevenson	8 October 1999
After taking some speed, Tim has spent all night playing Resident Evil 2 and Mike has accidentally travelled to Sheffield. Daisy has a job interview at a classy women's magazine ("Flaps") and Brian has an invitation to a new art show by Vulva (David Walliams), his former partner. At the art show, Tim's hallucinations of zombies cause him to punch Vulva in the face before fleeing. The episode concludes with Daisy's idea for performance art, a parody of Bruce Nauman's work "Clown Torture", which leads Tim to remark that it is obviously harder than it looks. This episode served as the inspiration for the 2004 horror comedy film Shaun of the Dead, which Pegg and Wright co-wrote.
4	4	"Battles"	Edgar Wright	Simon Pegg & Jessica Stevenson	15 October 1999
After getting dumped by her boyfriend Richard (James Lance), Daisy decides to cheer herself up by getting a dog called Colin. Having suffered a fear of dogs since childhood, Tim is not pleased by this. Tim and Mike go paintballing, and encounter Tim's arch-nemesis, Duane Benzie (Peter Serafinowicz), who stole Tim's girlfriend.
5	5	"Chaos"	Edgar Wright	Simon Pegg & Jessica Stevenson	22 October 1999
Daisy is strongly bonding with new dog Colin, much to Tim's displeasure. When Colin disappears while being walked by Tim, Daisy suspects Tim of letting Colin go. But Tim learns that the dog has been abducted by a ruthless, sinister cosmetics testing vivisectionist, and plans a daring rescue attempt.
6	6	"Epiphanies"	Edgar Wright	Simon Pegg & Jessica Stevenson	29 October 1999
Tim's bicycle courier friend Tyres (Michael Smiley) pops round for a cup of tea and decides to take the gang clubbing. Featured songs: "Synth and Strings" - Yomanda "Let Me Show You" - Camisra
7	7	"Ends"	Edgar Wright	Simon Pegg & Jessica Stevenson	5 November 1999
Tim is ecstatic when his ex-girlfriend Sarah decides she wants him back; Daisy is less so, causing much tension around the flat. Mike has an interview at the Territorial Army to determine whether he should be allowed back in following an incident in which he stole a tank. Following a heated argument, Daisy finally manages to write some articles, and Tim finally realises the right path for him. Brian asks Twist out on a date, and they begin a relationship.

=== Series 2 (2001) ===
No. overall	No. in series	Title	Directed by	Written by	Original release date
8	1	"Back"	Edgar Wright	Simon Pegg & Jessica Stevenson	23 February 2001
After receiving an injection of money following the sale of her articles, Daisy returns from her holiday in Asia, but finds it hard to settle back into normal life. Tim, a Star Wars fan, has been deeply upset by the poor quality of The Phantom Menace. Mike has been thrown out of his home after shooting the cat, and is sleeping in Daisy's room. Two sinister black-suited Matrix-like Agents (Kevin Eldon and Mark Gatiss) are hunting for Daisy after her bag was switched by a stranger (John Simm) at the airport.
9	2	"Change"	Edgar Wright	Simon Pegg & Jessica Stevenson	2 March 2001
Following a dispute with a young customer over Jar Jar Binks merchandise and Tim's inability to cope with the Star Wars prequels, Bilbo fires Tim. Daisy is trying to claim benefits at the Job Centre, despite not having signed on to the dole for three months due to her holiday. Brian is horrified to discover that his relationship with Twist is affecting his artistic output. After Amber leaves home, Marsha finds herself a new lodger – Mike.
10	3	"Mettle"	Edgar Wright	Simon Pegg & Jessica Stevenson	9 March 2001
Tim and Mike are in the Robot Wars quarter final, but their robot is sabotaged by a rival (Reece Shearsmith). Meanwhile, after being fired from several jobs, Daisy starts working in a kitchen, where her new boss (Joanna Scanlan) begins to make life difficult for her. Brian comes under stress as he is given little notice of an upcoming exhibition of his work.
11	4	"Help"	Edgar Wright	Simon Pegg & Jessica Stevenson	23 March 2001
After receiving a call from the mysterious Damien Knox (Clive Russell) of Darkstar Comics (and his seductive assistant Sophie (Lucy Akhurst), Tim employs Tyres to deliver his portfolio of artwork. Tim removes an unflattering caricature of Damien, but Daisy replaces it in an attempt to be helpful. Tim must then retrieve the job-threatening picture before Damien sees it, aided by Mike and Tyres.
12	5	"Gone"	Edgar Wright	Simon Pegg & Jessica Stevenson	30 March 2001
While spending an evening out in Camden, Tim and Daisy encounter some young hooligans (Lee Ingleby and Adam Deacon) who accuse them of substituting oregano for marijuana. Meanwhile, Tim's nemesis Duane Benzie steals Tim's house keys in an act of revenge for being shot while paintballing.
13	6	"Dissolution"	Edgar Wright	Simon Pegg & Jessica Stevenson	6 April 2001
At Daisy's birthday party, cracks begin to form between members of the group. Mike is jealous of Sophie taking all of Tim's time, Brian is tired of Twist using him like a fashion accessory, Daisy dislikes Sophie, and Marsha, still believing that Tim and Daisy are a couple, is upset by Tim apparently cheating on Daisy.
14	7	"Leaves"	Edgar Wright	Simon Pegg & Jessica Stevenson	13 April 2001
Marsha, having discovered that Daisy and Tim had lied to her and maintained their deception ever since moving in, is devastated, and decides to sell the house. Daisy is offered a job in Colwyn Bay, while Sophie takes a job in Seattle. Mike concocts a plan to change Marsha and Daisy's minds.

== Awards ==
Spaced was nominated in 2000 and 2002 for a British Academy Television Award for situation comedy. Jessica Stevenson won the British Comedy Award in 1999 and 2001 for best TV Comedy Actress. Simon Pegg was nominated in 1999 for the British Comedy Award for Best Male Comedy Newcomer, and the series was nominated that same year for the British Comedy Award for Best TV Sitcom. The show's second series was nominated for an International Emmy Award in 2001 for Popular Arts.

== Home releases ==
The first two series of Spaced were released individually on DVD in the United Kingdom. On 27 September 2004, a three-disc Collector's Edition was released, combining both series with a bonus disc featuring the documentary Skip to the End, which examined the programme's production and legacy. The collection also included Spaced Jam, a three-minute audiovisual remix of scenes and dialogue created by Osymyso.

The release of Spaced on DVD in North America was delayed by difficulties obtaining music licensing rights. In a 2008 interview with The A.V. Club, director Edgar Wright explained that the programme's music had originally been cleared for the United Kingdom but not for international distribution. Wright stated that interest in an American release increased following the success of Shaun of the Dead (2004), but resolving the outstanding music rights took several years. The producers were reluctant to replace the original soundtrack because of its importance to the programme.

Spaced: The Complete Series was released on Region 1 DVD on 22 July 2008. The collection presented both series uncut and featured additional audio commentaries with Wright, Simon Pegg, Jessica Hynes and guests including Quentin Tarantino, Kevin Smith and Diablo Cody.

Wright announced the release of a Region 1 Spaced DVD release on 22 July 2008, which included an all-new commentary with Wright, Pegg, and Stevenson, as well as special guests Quentin Tarantino, Kevin Smith, Bill Hader, Diablo Cody, Matt Stone and Patton Oswalt. Supplemental features included the original commentaries, the Skip to the End documentary, outtakes, deleted scenes, and raw footage.

A complete series Blu-ray will be released on 9 February 2027. Shortly after the announcement, Wright expressed disappointment over the release, revealing that it was not authorized by anyone involved in making the show and that he had not been involved in its production. He also criticized its use of AI to upscale the footage.

== End of the series ==
After the show's end, cast and crew associated with Spaced quoted with differing opinions as to whether a third series would be produced, with their later statements reflecting a consensus that the show has concluded and would not see a third series.

Edgar Wright initially was "torn" about making more Spaced, saying "we have genuinely talked about it and have some neat ideas that could work in a Before Sunset/Whatever Happened to the Likely Lads? kind of way". However, in April 2007, Wright confirmed that the show no longer had any possibility of returning in any form, as the actors were all now "too old", and he and Pegg feared it would ruin a good thing. In August of that same year, Wright told Rotten Tomatoes that "there's not going to be a third season, it would be silly now" but that they could "do something that sort of like catches our heroes ten years later."

During an interview with The Guardian in July 2013 promoting The World's End with Edgar Wright and Nick Frost, Pegg stated: "Whenever we get asked about... another series of Spaced... one of the reasons we're not going to do it is because we couldn't possibly write it with any degree of truth now, because that's not where we are or who we are any more. I always find it's better to write from a perspective of truth."

== American remake ==
Fox announced on 29 October 2007 that it would commission a pilot for an American version of Spaced, a project they then scuttled in May 2008 following a generally negative reaction from the series' creators and fans of the original show.

Wright was initially approached about an American version after the first series was broadcast in 1999, and felt an American remake was impossible due to the series' fundamental theme. "Same reason it couldn't be a film," Wright said. "Part of the charm of Spaced is, it's people in north London acting out stuff from American films... you know, Hollywood in, kind of, suburbia... American TV is much more glamorous. It doesn't make any sense. I remember that the producer at the time said, 'Yeah, we'd have to change a few things. We'd have to take out the drugs and the swearing, and obviously, Mike can't have guns.'"

Neither Wright, Pegg, nor Stevenson were at any point approached regarding the proposed American remake, which Wright had dubbed "McSpaced", due to the involvement of film director McG. Wright was upset that "they would a) never bother to get in touch but still b) splash my and Simon's names all over the trade announcements and imply that we're involved in the same way Ricky [Gervais] and Steve [Merchant] were with The Office". Pegg and Stevenson also complained of the "lack of respect" demonstrated by the creators of the proposed American series, who left them out of discussions as well.

Wright was also angry at the media for what he felt was their overlooking of Stevenson's role in the creation of Spaced by connecting the series to Shaun of the Dead and Hot Fuzz in news articles.
