= List of Room 101 episodes =

This is a list of episodes of the British comedy talk-show Room 101. The first three series were hosted by Nick Hancock and then Paul Merton hosted series 4 to 11. Starting with series 12, Frank Skinner is the host of a redesigned programme featuring three guests competing to get their items into Room 101.

Contents

Series: 1 · 2 · 3 · 4 · 5 · 6 · 7 · 8 · 9 · 10 · 11 · 12 · 13 · 14 · 15 · 16 · 17 · 18

Footnotes · References · External links

== Episodes ==
=== Series 1 ===
Episode	Broadcast	Guest	Rejected items	Banished items
1x01	4 July 1994	Bob Monkhouse	Cilla Black singing; The Golden Shot; "Kumbaya"; Presenting The Big Breakfast	The French; Ventriloquists whose lips move; Elvis Presley
1x02	11 July 1994	Ian Hislop	Kilroy; Beards; The Channel 4 talk show Loose Talk as presented by Ian Hislop	Postman Pat; Hello!; Truly, Madly, Deeply; The book A Parliamentary Affair by Edwina Currie
1x03	18 July 1994	Jo Brand	Mona Lisa; Smug people in car commercials; Spitting (gobbing)	1975; Jazz; The Magic Roundabout; Bonn
1x04	25 July 1994	Peter Cook	Domestic rabbits; Gracie Fields; Watchdog; The British countryside; Packaging	The "Dear Son" Nationwide Building Society advert; 1970s German softcore pornography
1x05	1 August 1994	David Baddiel	Football boots; Delicatessen; A photograph of himself taken in 1977; Tomorrow's World; Golfing memorabilia	Margi Clarke; The FA Cup draw
1x06	8 August 1994	Tony Slattery	An Odor Eaters advert; British chain hotels; "The Lady in Red" by Chris de Burgh; William Hague; 1980s daytime soap opera Gems starring Tony Slattery	The Our Tune feature of Simon Bates' radio shows; Snoopy; Space hoppers
1x07	15 August 1994	Maureen Lipman	Tom Jones; The film The Smashing Bird I Used to Know starring Maureen Lipman; The film Carry On Columbus again starring Maureen Lipman; Television quiz shows	Leggings; Television cop shows; The Word
1x08	22 August 1994	Danny Baker	QVC; Pub grub; A Robert Redford look-alike; Consumer affairs television	Casualty; Long gloves; Euro Disney

=== Series 2 ===
Episode	Broadcast	Guest	Rejected items	Banished items
2x01 (9)	1 September 1995	Richard Wilson	Smoking; Trainspotters; Gardeners' Question Time	Songs of Praise (Note: An item which was rejected at first, but was later chosen as a bonus item to go in); Come Dancing; Faeces
2x02 (10)	8 September 1995	Frank Skinner	Jokes that don't work; David Baddiel's cat Chairman Miaow; Sophie's Choice	Action Man; Unidentified tubes in meat; William Shakespeare
2x03 (11)	15 September 1995	Caroline Quentin	Bras for ladies with a large bosom; Weather forecasters; Teasmades; Les Misérables; Home perms	Rodents, especially rats
2x04 (12)	22 September 1995	Jimmy Tarbuck	Sports commentators; Dressing gowns	Children using the telephone; Australian television programmes; DIY; Richard and Judy
2x05 (13)	29 September 1995	Richard E. Grant	Sandals with socks; A Vauxhall Astra advert starring Richard E. Grant; Noisy people in cinemas	"Tie a Yellow Ribbon Round the Ole Oak Tree"; Jilly Goolden; Mathematics teachers; Sarah, Duchess of York
2x06 (14)	6 October 1995	Germaine Greer	Sister Wendy Beckett	The Joanna Trollope television series The Choir; Vivienne Westwood; Dogs with disproportionately large genitals; Her post; Michael Portillo's lips
2x07 (15)	13 October 1995	Angus Deayton	West Highland Terriers; BBC Two logos	BBC Radio 2; The 1960s; Cricket • Insurance companies; Car stickers
2x08 (16)	20 October 1995	Terry Christian	Musical films; Tortoises; Kenny Dalglish	The United States and the American people; Student backpackers; Blue Peter; Public schoolboys

=== Series 3 ===
Episode	Broadcast	Guest	Rejected items	Banished items
3x01 (17)	1 August 1997	Jeremy Clarkson	Last of the Summer Wine; Vegetarianism	Caravans; Flies; Golf
3x02 (18)	8 August 1997	Neil Morrissey	Germany	Mornings; 3-2-1; The Bay City Rollers; American football
3x03 (19)	15 August 1997	Terry Wogan	Animal sex; Guests on Wogan; Have I Got News for You	Eric Cantona; EastEnders
3x04 (20)	22 August 1997	Alan Davies	Live television; Keeping birds in cages; Actors eating while they are acting	The sound of posh people talking; Jacket and jeans combination; Liverpool
3x05 (21)	29 August 1997	Chris Tarrant	Nouvelle cuisine; Soap stars singing	Sooty; Mystic Meg; Opera; Clowns
3x06 (22)	12 September 1997	Arthur Smith	"Puppet on a String"; Bob Beamon's world record in the long jump being broken; Balloon modelling	Skiing; Dinner parties
3x07 (23)	19 September 1997	Ulrika Jonsson	Ferrero Rocher; United States fitness television channels; A photograph of herself as a baby	Doctors' surgeries; Yorkshire Terriers; School hockey
3x08 (24)	26 September 1997	Mark Lamarr	None (Note: Successfully got all their nominated items into Room 101)	"Y.M.C.A."; Telephone chatlines; Baby talk; Films with subtitles; Men's public toilets

=== Series 4 ===
Episode	First broadcast	Guest	Rejected items	Banished items
4x01 (25)	22 July 1999	Nick Hancock	Football • People who are happy • Theatre and actors	Being a teacher • New Year's Eve • People who do not know how to argue
4x02 (26)	29 July 1999	Michael Parkinson	People who dress up as football mascots • The small piece of cotton which holds a new pair of socks together • Marylebone Cricket Club • Teletubbies	Teenagers • Weather forecasts • Celebrities doing jobs for which they are not qualified
4x03 (27)	6 August 1999	Spike Milligan	Football (Note: Spike refused to take football home with him, saying "I'll get rid of it" before throwing the prop away)	Portsmouth (Note: This originally was not going to be banished to Room 101, as Paul Merton claimed that everyone in Southsea would fall into the water. However, in response to the crowd disagreeing, he said "Oh, okay then!" and pulled the lever, only for a model of The Victory illustrating Portsmouth to end up in Room 101. In response Spike said "You've just sunk The Victory!") • Muzak • Chris Evans • His own house • Soap operas • Hunting • Parties
4x04 (28)	13 August 1999	Jim Davidson	Lefties • The dark • Oysters • Motown	Richard Madeley • Beach holidays • Paul Daniels
4x05 (29)	20 August 1999	John Sergeant	Over-attentive waiters • Casualty • War reporting	Shopping for shoes • Margaret Thatcher • Plastic wrappers around videotapes and compact discs
4x06 (30)	27 August 1999	Meera Syal	Men adjusting their genitals in public (pocket billiards) • Decorative toilet roll covers • Wannabe ethnics	Cockroaches • Youth hostelling • Austria • The skin on rice pudding and custard • The song "Paper Roses" by Marie Osmond
4x07 (31)	3 September 1999	Esther Rantzen	Television cookery programmes • Incorrect word usage • Horror films	Leggings • Astrology • Gentlemen's clubs • Housework • Body piercing
4x08 (32)	10 September 1999	Julian Clary	Boats • The left side of his own face (Note: For the entire episode, Merton sat in the chair on the right where the guest would usually sit, while Clary sat on the left in Merton's place. This item was pointed out as the reason for the change) • Spitting • The countryside	Celebrity parties • The fact that dogs don't live long enough

=== Series 5 ===
Episode	First broadcast	Guest	Rejected items	Banished items
5x01 (33)	4 August 2000	Kathy Burke	Mobile phones • Fish bones	Kissing on both cheeks • Mathematics • Posh tea • Jeffrey Archer • Soppy love songs
5x02 (34)	11 August 2000	Terry Venables	Pins in shirts • Dogs that are too big for their surroundings • Football chairmen (Note: To decide whether to allow football chairmen into Room 101, Merton arranged a penalty shootout. As Venables failed to get two shots past Merton, the item was rejected.)	Uninformed journalists • People who reject their working class past • Cyclists
5x03 (35)	18 August 2000	Bill Bailey	Bras	His TV debut with a mind reading dog • The revamped theme tune to The Bill • The 1980s • Chris de Burgh
5x04 (36)	1 September 2000	Phill Jupitus	People that are not afraid of spiders • Pudding basin haircuts	Corporate fast food • Extended warranties • Cat lovers • God Save the Queen
5x05 (37)	8 September 2000	Janet Street-Porter	Pets	Ken Livingstone • Builders who make fun of her accent • BBC Radio 1 DJs • Stephen Bayley and other design gurus • Cockney culture
5x06 (38)	15 September 2000	Mo Mowlam	Verdigris on statues	Wigs • Lawyers • Smoking bans • Section 28 • Cooked apples • Golf
5x07 (39)	22 September 2000	Will Self	Airport design • Trainers	Bed and breakfast • The Crown Jewels • Cheese footballs
5x08 (40)	29 September 2000	Jonathan Ross	Gadgets that don't live up to their advertising • His own dress sense	The Royal Family going abroad • Dog lips • Plucky underdog films (Note: Such as Rocky and Escape to Victory. During this segment Ross claims that Sylvester Stallone's character playing as a goalkeeper runs up the field with the ball and scores the winning goal, when, in fact, this never happens and Stallone instead saves a penalty resulting in the match being a draw)

=== Series 6 ===
Episode	First broadcast	Guest	Rejected items	Banished items
6x01 (41)	8 January 2001	Paul Daniels	None	Synchronised swimming • DIY makeover shows like Changing Rooms • Top Gear • Cheese
6x02 (42)	15 January 2001	Rich Hall	None	Pointless science • Disney • Short people • Pretentious food • Modern country music
6x03 (43)	22 January 2001	Sanjeev Bhaskar	Skippy the Bush Kangaroo	Silent letters • Pet accessories • Alan Ball • Gifts from elderly relatives
6x04 (44)	29 January 2001	George Melly	Advertisers who use Estuary English as a selling technique • Swans • Growing old	Boy bands • Reverence to the Royal Family
6x05 (45)	5 February 2001	Liza Tarbuck	Compact Discs	Mini-cab drivers who beep their horn to let you know they've arrived • Men Are from Mars, Women Are from Venus • Litter • Slugs • Snot
6x06 (46)	12 February 2001	Lorraine Kelly	Scottish stereotyping	Comb overs • Elizabeth Hurley • Thongs • Realistic toys
6x07 (47)	19 February 2001	Des Lynam	Teeth • Eating in cinemas	Instruction manuals • France • Golf • Politicians • Rap
6x08 (48)	26 February 2001	Mel and Sue	Leighton Buzzard	Tonsils • Student drama • Protest raps • Nautical fashion • PE teachers (Note: Tonsils and protest raps were Mel's personal choices. Student drama and nautical fashion were Sue's personal choices.)
6x09 (49)	5 March 2001	Anne Robinson	The Welsh	Children's television presenters who shout • Big Mouth Billy Bass (Note: When Merton produced Billy Bass, instead of beginning the usual discussion he activated it and immediately banished it to Room 101) • Ben Elton • Media training (e.g. as used by spokesmen who appear on Watchdog) • 24-hour television news channels
6x10 (50)	12 March 2001	Stephen Fry	Commemorative plates	Late-night review shows • New Age • Australian Questioning Intonation • Room 101 (Note: Instead of discussing why he wants Room 101 put into Room 101, Fry instead discusses with Merton in a spin-off of the show called Room Lovely things he likes, such as iMac computers and Kathy Burke being examples. Merton ultimately decided to put Room 101 in to Room 101 only for the screen to fade into blackness, causing him to say "Wish I didn't do that now!")

=== Series 7 ===
Episode	First broadcast	Guest	Rejected items	Banished items
7x01 (51)	25 February 2002	Johnny Vegas	Courtroom drawings • Jackets for wine bottles	People who force holiday reps with no talent to entertain • Internet chat rooms • Novelty boxer shorts
7x02 (52)	4 March 2002	John Peel	Driving through Essex • Death • Men with beards	Men with colds • Shielding the ball in football • Shopping for clothes
7x03 (53)	11 March 2002	Fay Ripley	Shy people • Camping in tents • Champagne	Robert Kilroy-Silk • Horses
7x04 (54)	18 March 2002	Alexei Sayle	The Public	Static Electricity • Cirque du Soleil • Starbucks • Carved vegetables • Abuse of Disabled parking permits
7x05 (55)	25 March 2002	Patrick Moore	Advertising leaflets in newspapers • Female radio announcers	George Carey • May bugs • Loud pop music in restaurants • Plastic packaging
7x06 (56)	8 April 2002	Jessica Stevenson	Free love	Marzipan • Anne Robinson • Winter • Cross-country running • Zoos
7x07 (57)	15 April 2002	Michael Grade	Customs	Doctor Who • Miss World and other beauty contests • Powerboats • Shirley Bassey
7x08 (58)	22 April 2002	Ricky Gervais	Caravan holidays from his own youth	Babies in restaurants • Lateness • Telethons like Children in Need or Red Nose Day • Unnecessary noises (e.g. Whistling)

=== Series 8 ===
Episode	First broadcast	Guest	Rejected items	Banished items
8x01 (59)	3 November 2003	Ronan Keating	None	Hangovers • Daft questions in interviews (e.g. "if you were a biscuit, what kind of biscuit would you be?") • People who go out of their way to be rude • Large entourages • Pop stars who mime
8x02 (60)	10 November 2003	Boris Johnson	People who call out to him while he is Cycling	Boiled eggs • Richard Clayderman • Lynda Lee Potter • Smoking bans
8x03 (61)	17 November 2003	Linda Smith	Bow ties	Adults who read Harry Potter books • Tim Henman • "Back to School" signs in shops • Posh people (Note: This started as "comic opera", but was generalised to "posh people" by Paul, based on the nature of most of her other nominated items)
8x04 (62)	24 November 2003	Gordon Ramsay	London Taxi drivers • Changing his children's nappies	Service charges • Okra • Traffic wardens
8x05 (63)	1 December 2003	Ross Noble	People who look like Cats	Craig David • Cartoon animals that wear clothes • Clipboards • Christian rock
8x06 (64)	8 December 2003	Sean Lock	Jeremy Clarkson (Note: Jeremy Clarkson was not put in as Paul thought, as Jeremy Clarkson likes being hated, he would be more angry if he was not put into Room 101)	Concrete • Merchandising • Actors • Pointless tourist attractions
8x07 (65)	15 December 2003 (Note: Renato Pagliari made a guest appearance to illustrate the item "Save Your Love".)	Ron Atkinson	DIY and housework • Snakes • Spaghetti Junction • "Save Your Love" by Renée and Renato	Footballers who complain
8x08 (66)	22 December 2003	Bruce Forsyth	Yugoslavia	Lollo rosso lettuce and bottled water and bruised Jack Daniel's • The rules of golf • Announcers (mostly female) who shout at the end of a sentence • Directors who make Fast cuts

=== Series 9 ===
Episode	First broadcast	Guest	Rejected items	Banished items
9x01 (67)	13 September 2004 (Note: This episode featured a guest appearance by Brian Blessed to demonstrate the choice "very loud voices".)	Kirsty Young	People with either very loud or very quiet voices • Brazilian waxing	Cowboy boots • Britney Spears • "Baby on Board" stickers
9x02 (68)	20 September 2004	Shane Richie	Queuing • Out-of-date magazines in waiting rooms	Lousy massages • Donkey Derby • Trisha
9x03 (69)	27 September 2004	Tracey Emin	Tipping • Pointing at people aggressively	Herself being drunk • Cocaine • Clowns
9x04 (70)	4 October 2004	Harry Hill	Nocturnal animals in Zoos	Ice cream vans • Barney the Dinosaur • Traffic calming measures • God
9x05 (71)	11 October 2004	Michael Winner	Drivers who don't drive off immediately at green traffic lights • Snooty restaurant staff • Bad liars	People at the cinema or theatre with big heads who sit in front of you • Modern buildings
9x06 (72)	18 October 2004	Fern Britton	Flowers from a petrol station • Animal Hospital	Detox diets • Skiing Holidays • Small ladies' evening bags
9x07 (73)	25 October 2004	Omid Djalili	Open air theatres	Male yoga teachers • Places with no air conditioning • Chilies • Bad MCs and hecklers
9x08 (74)	1 November 2004	Michael Gambon	Fussy make-up artists • Birthdays	Buses in London between 10 am and 3 pm • The Government going on about education • Notting Hill

=== Series 10 ===
Episode	First broadcast	Guest	Rejected items	Banished items
10x01 (75)	14 September 2005	Dara Ó Briain	None	Children's television presenters • Once-in-a-Lifetime experiences (Note: Ó Briain was given a Once-In-A-Lifetime experience, by being the first person to pull the lever that opens the chute leading to Room 101 (although Nick Hancock had actually already done this during his appearance as a guest)) • Banter (on television) • Gillian McKeith • Magicians
10x02 (76)	21 September 2005	Alan Sugar	Men who wear wigs	Schmoozers • Call centres • Adverts that do not mention what is being sold • American English
10x03 (77)	28 September 2005	Sara Cox	None	Science fiction on television • Random fireworks displays • Moths • 19-year-old women • Bad nightclub etiquette
10x04 (78)	5 October 2005	Gyles Brandreth	None	The Royal Variety Performance • The honours system • Dates • The House of Commons • Raffles and raffle prizes
10x05 (79)	12 October 2005	Sheila Hancock	Herself • Benjy, her pet cat (Note: Hancock did not want Benjy to be permanently consigned, only long enough for Benjy to realise how bad things could be, so Merton allowed her to "dip" Benjy in Room 101 for a few seconds before pulling him back out.)	Chiswick Post Office • Immaculate men • Cows, sheep and horses
10x06 (80)	19 October 2005	Phillip Schofield	Gordon the Gopher	Rooks • Southend • Glitter in greeting cards • The satellite navigation system in his own car
10x07 (81)	26 October 2005	Jenny Eclair	Tottenham Court Road • Goody bags • Balloons (Note: Balloons actually were accepted into Room 101, but when Paul pulled the lever, instead of the balloons falling into Room 101, they floated into the air)	Charmless muggers • Jellyfish
10x08 (82)	2 November 2005	Phil Collins	None	TV evangelists • High cut swimming trunks • Instruction manuals • List shows • Noel and Liam Gallagher

=== Series 11 ===
Episode	First broadcast	Guest	Rejected items	Banished items
11x01 (83)	5 January 2007	Cilla Black	None	Weather forecasters • Famous people who say "Do you know who I am?" • Camera phones • Unwrapped food • Airline emergency procedures
11x02 (84)	12 January 2007	Marcus Brigstocke	None	His own appetite • Football • David Blaine • Personalised number plates • Grammar bullies like Lynne Truss
11x03 (85)	19 January 2007	Nigel Havers	Budget airlines • Conservatories	Global warming • Mobile phones in theatres • Barbecues • Dogs living in cities
11x04 (86)	26 January 2007	Mark Steel	Teachers who destroy the confidence of their pupils	Bono • Obsession with crime • Ben Elton • Politicians claiming they are in touch with modern music and popular culture when they aren't
11x05 (87)	2 February 2007	Davina McCall	Competitive mothers	Space travel • Fake things • Male world leaders • The songs of Frank Sinatra
11x06 (88)	9 February 2007	Ian Hislop (Note: The Ian Hislop episode was the last of Paul Merton's tenure as host of Room 101. Hislop was the only person to appear twice on the show in its original format and he deliberately chose items which he knew Merton liked, such as The Beatles and Charlie Chaplin.)	The Beatles • Strawberries • Charlie Chaplin • Piers Morgan (Note: Paul Merton did consign Piers Morgan to oblivion, but Room 101 considered him too toxic and rejected him.)	Paul Merton (Note: In the end, Merton was the only item to go in, but with a twist, literally, as he turned the cardboard cutout of himself round to reveal Hislop on the other side – Merton would only go in on the condition that he took Hislop with him)

=== Series 12 ===
Episode	First broadcast	Guests	Rejected items	Banished items
12x01 (89)	20 January 2012	Danny Baker; Fern Britton; Robert Webb (Note: Declared the "winner" of the show for being the most persuasive guest)	PE lessons • Being cool • Sci-fi • Panel shows • Feng shui (Note: Item only shown in the "Extra Storage" extended version) • Self-service checkouts • Dinner parties • Punk rock	Homework • The Jeremy Kyle Show • the News • Robert Webb's bald patch • Russell Crowe (Note: Item that went in unchallenged for being the most persuasive guest)
12x02 (90)	27 January 2012	Gabby Logan; Sarah Millican; Gregg Wallace	Barbecues • Empty Chicken Kievs • TV about ill people • Surprises • Old people at cash points • Bad sales assistants • Cats that ignore Sarah Millican • Music festivals and live music	Buffets • Scripted reality TV shows • Intimidating experts • People who say that the 2012 Olympics will be rubbish • Shell suits
12x03 (91)	3 February 2012	Alice Cooper; Chris Packham; Chris Tarrant	Jedward • Chris Moyles • Wild animals that are kept as pets • Humans • People in shorts • People who act as painted statues • Publicly displayed children's art • Balloon sculptures	Reality TV stars • Parrots • People who talk in the cinema • Insurance adverts • Sooty
12x04 (92)	10 February 2012	Jamelia; Germaine Greer; Ross Noble	Computer Pop-ups • Health and safety • Commuting cyclists who break the law • Smelly people • Budget airlines • Baggage carousels • Fun runs • Folk dancing	Text speak • Actors • Airport security • Mornings • Silent letters
12x05 (93)	17 February 2012	Hilary Devey; Josh Groban; Alistair McGowan	Football fans • Pet owners who treat their pets like people • Pints of beer • The exclusive night club experience • Valentine's Day • Tattoos	Children • Smoking ban • People who call you "Mate" that you've never met before (Note: Item selected by the audience) • Auto Tune • Small earphones
12x06 (94)	24 February 2012	Rhod Gilbert; Nick Hewer; Carol Vorderman	Camping • Holidays • Rhod Gilbert • EastEnders • Advertising slogans • Tracksuits • Golf • British sportsmanship	Train managers • Handbags • Facebook • Olympic opening and closing ceremonies
12x07 (95)	2 March 2012	Larry Lamb; Lauren Laverne; David O'Doherty	High fives • Fake Tension in lighthearted entertainment • Square plates • Ostentatious dressers • People who work for survey companies • Music snobs • Fancy dress • Turning 35 years old	Fake tan • Confusing toilet signs • People who don't keep things tidy • Flags • Adult animals
12x08 (96)	9 March 2012	Micky Flanagan; Rebecca Front; John Prescott	Audience participation • Pictures of John Prescott being misrepresented • Goal celebrations • Americanisms • People who give "unwanted" massages • People who pay by credit cards in pubs • Air fresheners • The countryside	TV Chefs • Other people's music • People who shout into their mobile phones • Old School Tie • The title, "Lord"

=== Series 13 ===
Episode	First broadcast	Guests	Rejected items	Banished items
13x01 (97)	4 January 2013	John Craven; Miranda Hart; Reggie Yates	Yoghurt drinks • Marrows • E-books • Smartphones • Girls who wear false nails • Weather forecasts • Hip-hop handshake • Miranda Hart's breasts	Fruit and vegetables out of context • Bluetooth headsets • Unusual spellings of common names • Spitting
13x02 (98)	11 January 2013	Victoria Coren; Phil Tufnell; Sir Terry Wogan	Interviewing runners-up at sports events • Nudity in female changing rooms • Hors d'oeuvre • The term "English breakfast tea" • Clichéd language on TV • Raising the end of a sentence • Windows that don't open properly • Health fads	The Australia cricket team during Phil Tufnell's England days • Food packaging • "Party" used as a verb • Tipping
13x03 (99)	18 January 2013	Greg Davies; Ben Fogle; Janet Street-Porter	Extreme Fishing with Robson Green • Multichannel TV • Women who want to be treated as "ladies" • A Spanish man who hates Greg Davies • Help with packing supermarket bags • 1p coins • Umbrellas • Friends' hobbies	Interviewing members of the public • People who use wheeled suitcases • Shops with escalators going up but stairs going down • Local TV news
13x04 (100)	25 January 2013	Paloma Faith; Jason Manford; Deborah Meaden	Ugg boots • Lush • People who use the phrase "With All Due Respect" • People in Lifts • Musicals with no spoken parts • Overnight successes • Small cars in car parks • Smart casual dress code	People who don't have their money ready • Jobsworths • Concert etiquette • Fifty Shades of Grey
13x05 (101)	1 February 2013	Cilla Black; Hugh Dennis; Mel Giedroyc	People who make you sign cards • People who over-pronounce Italian words • Olive oil • Rhubarb • Parent and toddler fun groups • All modern technology • People who tell you about their dreams • Las Vegas	People who say "Do You Know Who I Am?" • Vending machines • Giant charity cheques • Knickers
13x06 (102)	8 February 2013	Clive Anderson; Alex Jones; Jack Whitehall	Seagulls • Deer • Shared tables • British themed bars in foreign countries • Women on hen nights • Taxi drivers who don't know the address • People who book things well in advance • Metrosexuality	Glamping • Waiters who pour a little bit of wine into your glass • Football fans who leave the game early • People who watch the same film over and over again
13x07 (103)	15 February 2013	Jo Brand; Ben Miller; Bill Turnbull	Low slung jeans • Designer shoes • Rude drivers • Middle lane drivers • Personalised number plates • Friends of friends • Vampire films • Sneezing	Shoelaces • Other pedestrians • People who don't know a wasp from a bee • Homeopathy
13x08 (104)	22 February 2013	Sheila Hancock; Craig Revel Horwood; Jon Richardson	Wedding speeches • Dancing • People who give Sheila Hancock scented candles • All of Jon Richardson's friends who have settled down • People who call Sheila Hancock "dear" • Fat darts players • Jon Richardson's brain • People who tell jokes all the time	Fireworks • House guests • Critics • Ladies' toilets

=== Series 14 ===
Episode	First broadcast	Guests	Rejected items	Banished items
14x01 (105)	24 January 2014	Joan Bakewell; Roisin Conaty; Richard Osman	Gardening • "All the rubbish animals in the zoo" • Cobblers • Selfies • Pre-written greeting cards • Chewing gum on the pavement	Bambi • Customer service surveys • People who mispronounce the letter 'H' • People telling Richard Osman he's tall
14x02 (106)	31 January 2014	Michael Ball; Caroline Quentin; Henning Wehn	Junk mail • Control pants • People who wear novelty pants, socks and ties • The Royal Family • Knick-Knacks • People singing Happy Birthday in restaurants	Fundraising • Clairvoyants • People who give grown men teddy bears and stuffed animals as gifts
14x03 (107)	7 February 2014	Lee Mack; Dave Myers; Ruby Wax	Top Gear • Deal or No Deal • Newsreaders who think they're comedians • Chunky chips • New-age books • Children's parties • Ruby Wax's mother	Celebrity Shark Bait • David Blaine • wigs
14x04 (108)	14 February 2014	Kelly Hoppen; Miles Jupp; Vernon Kay	Parents who allow children to climb up slides • People with weak handshakes • People on boats who wave to other people on boats • Toilet roll covers • Automatic doors • Three quarter length shorts • Loud noises	People who drop litter • Modern children's games • Tradesmen in the home
14x05 (109)	21 February 2014	Sara Cox; Aled Jones; Josh Widdicombe	The Lord of the Rings • Eyelashes on car headlights • Devon • Scorpions • Death metal music • Christmas round-robins	Fish bones • Dill • Mayonnaise • Slogan T-shirts
14x06 (110)	28 February 2014	Gyles Brandreth; Melanie C Adam Hills	People who spoil movie plots • People who think Melanie is deaf • Passwords • Choice of toothpastes • Abs • £2 coin	The electorate • People who tell you to cheer up • Naming rights to sports stadiums • Acceptance speeches at award ceremonies (Note: On the original version of the show, Gyles was allowed a bonus go to put in whatever he wanted and chose this, but oddly, in the "Extra Storage" version, this was put in the wildcard round, along with abs and the £2 coin.)
14x07 (111)	7 March 2014	Charles Dance; Laurence Llewelyn-Bowen; Andi Osho	People who don't play Monopoly by the rules • People who wear Hawaiian shirts • Pasties • Pebble beaches • Internet dating • Camden Council's automated telephone services	George Osborne • NHS receptionists • People who stick their tongues out in photos • Beige
14x08 (112)	14 March 2014	Steve Jones; Sue Perkins; Bruno Tonioli	Flat pack furniture • Catalogues • Parent and child parking spaces • Gym etiquette • Ten-pin bowling • Cinema etiquette • Mime	Enforced present buying • Tacky shop fronts • Anne Robinson

=== Series 15 ===
Episode	First broadcast	Guests	Rejected items	Banished items
15x01 (113)	2 January 2015	Ronni Ancona; Len Goodman; Tim Vine	Foreign food • Karaoke DJs • The phrase "Only Joking" • Christmas starting early • Family photographs • Cats in the garden	Small talk at parties • Too much choice • The Metric System
15x02 (114)	9 January 2015	Jack Dee; Gary Lineker; Fay Ripley	Competitive parents • Football pundits • Leggings • Hand Driers • Pop songs in adverts • Box junctions	White Van Drivers • Internet Trolls • People who are too honest
15x03 (115)	16 January 2015	Fiona Bruce; Ray Mears; Katherine Ryan	Parties where nobody dances • Nappies • Cheryl Fernandez-Versini • Vladimir Putin • Caravans • Complicated car dashboards	Fakes • People who put lots of cushions on their bed • Bread
15x04 (116)	22 January 2015 (Note: Brought forward a day due to FA Cup coverage.)	Alexander Armstrong; Henry Blofeld; Dame Kelly Holmes	Answer machine messages • People who want to talk at breakfast • Snoring in public • The days between Christmas and New Year • Stickers on kitchenware • Unnecessary cocktail ingredients	M25 motorway • People who say "Have A Nice Day" • Portable toilets • Restaurants that don't serve English mustard
15x05 (117)	30 January 2015	Sara Pascoe; Jonathan Ross; Michael Vaughan	Luis Suárez • The Grim Reaper • Pick and Mix • Snails • Time • Adverts featuring dead celebrities	People who misuse the word "Literally" • Stupid things said to vegetarians • Miming
15x06 (118)	13 February 2015 (Note: Moved back a week due to FA Cup coverage.)	Victoria Coren Mitchell; Warwick Davis; Dr. Christian Jessen	James Bond • Doctors • People who put empty containers back in the fridge • Petrol station shops that close at night • Special Offers	People who send email • Fiddly bracelets • German pop music (Note: In the normal version of the show, Jessen was asked to pick a bonus item and he chose this. In the Extra Storage version, this was included in the wild-card round and was rejected.) • Pampering
15x07 (119)	18 February 2015 (Note: Moved forward two days due to an EastEnders live broadcast.)	Bob Mortimer; Brendan O'Carroll; Rachel Riley	Shop assistants who put the change on top of the receipt • People who think they are important because they wear a uniform • Wrapping food in bacon • Pedal bins in hotel rooms • Unripe fruit in supermarkets • The "Essex girl" stereotype	People who can't use a mobile phone • People who tell you not to eat things that are bad for you • Elvis Impersonators • Bad public toilet etiquette
15x08 (120)	27 February 2015	Adrian Chiles; Jameela Jamil; Des O'Connor	Horoscopes • Bad breakup etiquette • Pantomimes • Toes protruding from women's shoes	People who recline seats on aeroplanes • Loud eaters
15x09 (121)	6 March 2015	Compilation Show	Compilation of clips from Series 15 that included two previously unseen items: News reporters who stand in the rain • People who don't eat what you have cooked It was not shown if these were rejected or banished.	

=== Series 16 ===
Episode	First broadcast	Guests	Rejected items	Banished items
16x01 (122)	14 January 2016	Aisling Bea; Sir Trevor McDonald; David Tennant	Sushi • Pigeons • Lateness • Scooters	Queueing • David Tennant's South African accent • Flossing (Note: Bonus item chosen by David Tennant.)
16x02 (123)	21 January 2016	Noel Fielding; Joanna Scanlan; Ian Wright	Grease • Bad toast etiquette • Stinky cheese • Hangovers	Spiders • Numbers • Pockets on kids' clothes (Note: Bonus item chosen by Ian Wright.)
16x03 (124)	4 February 2016	Greg Davies; Katie Price; Adil Ray	People who give their dogs specific instructions • Beards • People with no talent on talent shows • Ketchup	Parking • Hotel check-in and check-out
16x04 (125)	11 February 2016	James Acaster; Heston Blumenthal; Kirsty Wark	Geese • People who put milk in tea first • Plastic flowers • The shot put	Men who wear too much aftershave • Food that doesn't taste as good as you remember
16x05 (126)	18 February 2016	Shaun Ryder; Sam Simmons; Meera Syal	Meeting new people • Holding hands • Severe makeover shows • Boisterous whistling	Overuse of the word 'Like' • Football talk
16x06 (127)	25 February 2016	John Humphrys; Russell Kane; Claudia Winkleman	Men who get grumpier with age • Summer • Fussy eaters • Professional sport	Whooping in audiences • Skiing • Foreheads
16x07 (128)	3 March 2016	Bridget Christie; Greg James; Robert Peston	The Kardashians • Babies • Management speak • Politicians pretending to be normal	Lycra • People's sense of entitlement • Spectators at Wimbledon (Note: Bonus item chosen by Greg James.)
16x08 (129)	10 March 2016	Russell Howard; Katherine Parkinson; John Torode	Dreams • DJs that join in at the end of a song • Women who cross their legs when having their photo taken • Grumpy kids	Massive pepper grinders • Predictive text • When your tummy rumbles (Note: Bonus item chosen by Russell Howard.)
16x09 (130)	17 March 2016	Compilation Show	Compilation of clips from Series 16 that included three previously unseen items: Twins • People who are too much into Batman • Cling film It was not shown if these were rejected or banished.	

=== Series 17 ===
Episode	Broadcast date	Guests	Rejected items	Banished items
17x01 (131)	13 January 2017	Rylan Clark-Neal; Nigel Havers; Catherine Tate	Jeremy Corbyn • Low ceilings • Shops in airports • Hipster restaurants	Minimiser bras • Setup paparazzi photo shoots • People who don't say "thank you" on a zebra crossing
17x02 (132)	20 January 2017	David Mitchell; Judy Murray; Anita Rani	People who get annoyed when you don't remember them • Walking and eating • Inane motorway signs • Sugar lumps	Sniffing • Clutter • Cajun food
17x03 (133)	3 February 2017	Rob Beckett; Sophie Ellis-Bextor; Ross Kemp	Teeth • Misplaced clapping • Enforced seating plans • Insurance	Snobby shop assistants • Expensive water in hotel rooms
17x04 (134)	10 February 2017	Joe Lycett; Zoe Lyons; Ricky Wilson	People that show you YouTube videos • Escalators • Bin day • The bartender at Joe Lycett's local pub	New towels • Running out of loo roll • Mating Foxes
17x05 (135)	17 February 2017	Lucy Porter; Romesh Ranganathan; Judge Rinder	Lavish proposals • Couples who communicate on social media • Child actors • School Reunions	New Year's Eve • will.i.am
17x06 (136)	24 February 2017	Richard Ayoade; Alun Cochrane; Gabby Logan	Audiences cheering at the mention of the town they reside in • Advice • People who are afraid of flying • People who laugh out loud when reading a book	Half and half football scarves • Fun
17x07 (137)	3 March 2017	Rob Delaney; Laurence Fox; Davina McCall	Women who tell other women about terrible births • Hand sanitiser • People who order starters • 12 string guitars	Cats • Cyclists in lycra • Ribbon loops on dresses
17x08 (138)	17 March 2017	Nicola Adams; Frankie Boyle; Diane Morgan	Magicians • Losing your keys • Microwaves • Winter clothes	Richard Branson • Celebrity atheists • Being woken up • Life itself
17x09 (139)	8 May 2017	Compilation Show	Compilation of clips from Series 17 that included four previously unseen items: Guilty pleasures • Decaf coffee in hotel rooms • School cake sales • Halloween; It was not shown if these were rejected or banished.	

=== Series 18 ===
Episode	Broadcast date	Guests	Rejected items	Banished items
18x01 (140)	12 January 2018	Charlie Brooker; Pearl Mackie; Scarlett Moffatt	Anything Charlie doesn't want to do • Crocs • Having your hair cut • Swimming goggles	Mosquitoes • Little cartons of UHT milk • Dance party endings on kids' films (Note: Bonus item chosen by Charlie Brooker.)
18x02 (141)	19 January 2018	Alex Brooker; Jeremy Paxman; Sally Phillips	Positive thinking • Tourist attractions • Fitbits • Dog jackets	David Cameron • Homemade football signs • Karl Marx (Note: Bonus item chosen by Jeremy Paxman.)
18x03 (142)	2 February 2018 (Note: Episode 3 of Series 18 was moved back a week because no episode was aired on 26 January 2018 because of the football as BBC One showed live coverage of the FA Cup fourth-round game between Yeovil Town and Manchester United from 7.30 pm (7.55 pm Kickoff).)	Jimmy Carr; Rochelle Humes; Steven Moffat	Being Scottish • HD TV • Ordinary people's opinions • Sandy beaches	Tax loopholes • People who don't bring a bag on a night out • Pseudoscience (Note: Bonus item chosen by Jimmy Carr.)
18x04 (143)	9 February 2018	Vicky McClure; Sandi Toksvig; Josh Widdicombe	Pointless things you learn at school • Leaflets in hotel rooms • Real ale • Bar stools	People being rude about Paul McCartney • Coat hangers • Radio phone-ins (Note: Bonus item chosen by Josh Widdicombe.)
18x05 (144)	16 February 2018	Roisin Conaty; Chris Kamara; Nish Kumar	Men who don't give up their seats to women on trains • Ex-partners • Oscar bait • Downloading music	People who are really into cars • Bread in restaurants • Football players who fake injury (Note: Bonus item chosen by Chris Kamara.)
18x06 (145)	9 March 2018 (Note: Episode 6 of Series 18 wasn't aired on 2 March 2018 because of The One Show, which was extended to an hour because it became a snow special, thus Room 101 was postponed for that week. It was cancelled the previous week Friday 23 February 2018 because of live coverage of the Six Nations Championship game between France and Italy from 7.30 P.M. (8.00 P.M. kickoff))	Adam Buxton; Geri Horner; Katherine Ryan	Pens that don't work • People in shops commenting on Adam's purchases • Wackaging • Marathons	Phone calls • Guilt • Friends by association (Note: Bonus item chosen by Katherine Ryan.)
18x07 (146)	16 March 2018	Bill Bailey; Alice Levine; Una Stubbs	Taramasalata • People who talk too loudly • Moths • Drama clichés	Passive-aggressive politeness • Trying on clothes • Nodding acquaintances (Note: Bonus item chosen by Bill Bailey.)
18x08 (147)	30 March 2018 (Note: Episode 8 of Series 18 was moved back a week because there was no episode on 23 March 2018 due to BBC One's coverage of Sport Relief.)	Stephen Mangan; Holly Walsh; Phil Wang	Tom Hiddleston • The Archers • Changing your surname after getting married • Having a bath	Making friends with your aerobics instructor • People who don't pick up their dog's poo
18x09 (148)	6 April 2018	Compilation show	Compilation of clips from Series 18 that included previously unseen items: Whinging Brexit leave voters • Dabbing • People who love the outdoors It was not shown if these were rejected or banished.	
