= List of They Think It's All Over episodes =

This is a list of episodes from the satirical sport-based panel game They Think It's All Over.

From series 1 until series 5 the show was chaired by Nick Hancock, with team captains David Gower (and regular panellist Lee Hurst) and Gary Lineker (and regular panellist Rory McGrath) and a guest on each team. For series 6 and 7, Lee Hurst's position was switched with various celebrity guests such as Phill Jupitus and Alan Davies. From series 8 onwards Jonathan Ross replaced Lee Hurst permanently. From series 16 onwards David Gower and Gary Lineker were replaced as team captains by Phil Tufnell and David Seaman. From series 18, Ian Wright replaced David Seaman as captain. From series 19, Lee Mack became the new host and Boris Becker replaced Phil Tufnell as team captain, while Jonathan Ross was replaced by Sean Lock as the regular panellist on Boris' team for the 2006 specials.

The show was cancelled following series 19, although there were two specials in the summer of 2006 and a special episode aired live as part of 24 Hour Panel People in 2011, for which Hancock, Tufnell and Hurst returned (in spite of the fact that Tufnell and Hurst had been regulars at different points in the show).

== Episode list ==
Over the 19 series, 154 episodes were broadcast. There have also been two exclusive-to-video editions and a live webcast version for Comic Relief.

The coloured backgrounds denote the result of each of the shows:

– indicates David (Gower)'s/Phil's/Boris' team won
– indicates Gary's/David (Seaman)'s/Ian's team won
– indicates the game ended in a draw

=== Series 1 ===
Index	Air date	David & Lee's guest	Gary & Rory's guest	Score
01x01	14 September 1995	Rory Bremner	Roger Black	17–23
01x02	21 September 1995	Clive Anderson	Tessa Sanderson	21–18
01x03	28 September 1995	John Barnes	Jo Brand	25–17
01x04	5 October 1995	Fred MacAulay	Barry McGuigan	TBC
01x05	12 October 1995	John Motson (Note: Was also in the Feel The Sportsman round)	Alistair McGowan	25–26
01x06	19 October 1995	Ally McCoist	Hugh Dennis	18–18 (Note: In the Christmas special, the series was retroactively awarded to David's team after it was revealed that Gary and Rory had cheated in this episode's Feel The Sportsman round by poking holes in their blindfolds with needles.)
01x07	28 December 1995 (Note: Christmas Special)	Mel Smith	Allan Lamb	15–16

=== Series 2 ===
Index	Air date	David & Lee's guest	Gary & Rory's guest	Score
02x01	12 March 1996	Neil Morrissey	Ian Wright	15–16 (Note: The final score was 15–15, so Nick Hancock played an excerpt from an interview with Arsenal's Ray Parlour before the 1993 FA Cup Final, and the teams had to guess how many times he said the word "obviously". Gary's team guessed 6, while David's team guessed 5; the correct answer was 7, making Gary's team the winners.)
02x02	19 March 1996	Bob Mills	Sharron Davies	17–15
02x03	26 March 1996	Steve Cram	Craig Charles	18–17 (Note: The final score was 17–17, so Nick Hancock asked Gary a question from Gary Lineker's Soccer Quiz Book, which Gary was unable to answer, making David's team the winners.)
02x04	2 April 1996	John Gordon Sinclair	Kriss Akabusi	12–19
02x05	9 April 1996	Steve Davis	Gaby Roslin	19–18
02x06	16 April 1996	Teddy Sheringham	Frank Skinner	20–21 (Note: The final score was 20–20, so Nick Hancock asked David for the name of the author of David Gower's Cricket Quiz Book. David failed to give the correct answer of Patrick Allen, so Gary's team were declared the winners.)
02x07	23 April 1996	Tony Hawks	Rob Wainwright (Note: Replaced Will Carling, who "...had decided to pull out at the last minute.")	20–19 (Note: The final score was 19–19, and as both teams had won three of the previous six episodes, a tiebreaker of Rock-paper-scissors was played, with David's scissors beating Gary's paper.)

=== Series 3 ===
Index	Air date	David & Lee's guest	Gary & Rory's guest	Score
03x01	12 September 1996	Ian Walker	Gordon Kennedy	17–22
03x02	19 September 1996	Alistair McGowan	Jimmy 'Five Bellies' Gardner	21–23
03x03	26 September 1996	Kelly Holmes	Curtis Walker	17–18
03x04	3 October 1996	Mark Little	Brian Moore	23–20
03x05	10 October 1996	Chris Waddle	Jo Brand	19–15
03x06	17 October 1996	Dermot Reeve	Mark Hurst	15–17
03x07	24 October 1996	Nick Owen	Phill Jupitus	18–20
03x08	23 December 1996	Steve Backley	David Baddiel	20–25

==== No Holds Barred ====
Index	Air date	David & Lee's guest	Gary & Rory's guest	Score
Video	4 November 1996	Roger Black	Neil Morrissey	21–20

=== Series 4 ===
Index	Air date	David & Lee's guest	Gary & Rory's guest	Score
04x01	9 April 1997	Phil Tufnell	Alan Davies	24–20
04x02	16 April 1997	Steve Collins	Tony Hawks	11–18
04x03	23 April 1997	Dave Bassett	Mark Little	15–17
04x04	30 April 1997	Brough Scott	Stephen Fry	18–19
04x05	7 May 1997	Denise Lewis	Jeff Green	14–20
04x06	14 May 1997	Matthew Pinsent	Julian Clary	19–16
04x07	21 May 1997	Ron Atkinson	Zoe Ball	20–17

==== Full Throttle ====
Index	Air date	David & Lee's guest	Gary & Rory's guest	Score
Video	3 November 1997	John Motson	Fred MacAulay	29–30

=== Series 5 ===
Index	Air date	David & Lee's guest	Gary & Rory's guest	Score
05x01	6 November 1997	Ainsley Harriott	Steve Davis	17–16
05x02	13 November 1997	Tony Banks MP	John Moloney	21–20
05x03	20 November 1997	Frankie Dettori	Alistair McGowan	15–16
05x04	27 November 1997	Suzanne Dando	Stuart Hall	18–17 (Note: The episode finished 17–17. Lee suggested that if Suzanne could do the splits, their team should be declared the winners; Nick instead suggested that Lee and Rory should attempt the splits. Lee went first, but Rory forfeited his turn, making David's team the winners.)
05x05	4 December 1997	Sharron Davies	Phill Jupitus	19–16
05x06	11 December 1997	Chris Eubank	Arthur Smith	15–20
05x07	18 December 1997	Phill Jupitus, (Note: Jupitus stood in for Hurst.) Iwan Thomas	Jeff Green	11–17
05x08	25 December 1997	Matthew Corbett with Sooty	Graeme Le Saux	18–17 (Note: Gary's team had actually won 22–17, but while everyone else in the studio wore their chosen Christmas outfits, Gary refused to wear his Little Bo Peep costume, so Nick penalised him 5 points, unless he wore it, which he declined, so as a tie-breaker, the teams were shown some footage of hamster drag racing, and had to guess which of the blue and red racer won. David's team correctly chose the red racer, giving them the win, despite Gary then desperately trying to put on the Little Bo Peep costume after the clip)

=== Series 6 ===
Index	Air date	David's guests	Gary & Rory's guest	Score	Viewing figures
06x01	12 November 1998	Alan Davies, Frank Leboeuf	Arthur Smith	22–21	9.65m
06x02	19 November 1998	Phill Jupitus, Roger Black	Annabel Croft	18–17	12.02m
06x03	26 November 1998	Jonathan Ross, Jeffrey Archer	Vic Henley	14–17	8.34m
06x04	3 December 1998	Jo Brand, Gabby Yorath	Pauline McLynn	18–17 (Note: The game originally finished 18–17 to Gary's team, but Nick Hancock announced that Gary had sweet talked the answer to a question from two weeks earlier from the autocue girl and docked them a point. They lost in a "What happened next?" tiebreaker.)	8.39m
06x05	10 December 1998	Jo Brand, Greg Rusedski	Fred MacAulay	20–17	8.26m
06x06	17 December 1998	Julian Clary, Jeff Green	Jonathan Pearce	18–20 (Note: The Christmas and New Year's specials were not considered part of Series 6, so David's team were declared the series winners by four games to two.)	8.17m
06x07	25 December 1998	Jonathan Ross, Phil Cornwell	Colin Montgomerie	10–17	12.31m
06x08	31 December 1998	Phill Jupitus, Vinnie Jones	Iain Lee	12–20	n/a

=== Series 7 ===
Index	Air date	David's guests	Gary & Rory's guest	Score
07x01	15 April 1999	Jo Brand, Steve Davis	Clive Anderson	18–20
07x02	22 April 1999	Jonathan Ross, Eddie Irvine	Bradley Walsh	18–17
07x03	29 April 1999	Jonathan Ross, Lee Mack	Clare Balding	15–18
07x04	6 May 1999	Jo Brand, Sanjeev Bhaskar	Phil Tufnell	17–19
07x05	13 May 1999	Jonathan Ross, Curtis Walker	Steve Cram	19–18 (Note: The episode finished 18–18, so David and Gary arm-wrestled each other as a tiebreaker, with David winning.)
07x06	20 May 1999	Jo Brand, Fred MacAulay	David Coulthard	16–13
07x07	27 May 1999	Jonathan Ross, Jeff Green	Gary McAllister	17–20

=== Series 8 ===
Index	Air date	David & Jonathan's guest	Gary & Rory's guest	Score
08x01	11 November 1999	David Campese	Junior Simpson	1–15
08x02	18 November 1999	Vic Henley	Geoffrey Boycott	22–15
08x03	25 November 1999	Frankie Dettori	Sean Meo	20–18
08x04	2 December 1999	Steve Davis, (Note: Guest captain in this episode) Arthur Smith	Paula Radcliffe	10–17
08x05	9 December 1999	Sam Torrance	Sean Lock	19–18
08x06	16 December 1999	Steve Davis, Ron Atkinson	Jo Brand	14–18
08x07	23 December 1999	Helen Chamberlain	Keith Allen	20–19
08x08	25 December 1999	David Baddiel	Clare Balding	15–22 (Note: Gary's team won a tiebreaker for the series by guessing closer to the price of a VHS copy of Rory McGrath's Commercial Breakdown than David's team.)

=== Series 9 ===
Index	Air date	David & Jonathan's guest	Gary & Rory's guest	Score
09x01	20 April 2000	James Hewitt	Nasser Hussain	16–17
09x02	27 April 2000	Shane Howarth	Rich Hall	12–14 (Note: Gary's team had won the episode, but during the show, guest Rich Hall looked at one of the answer cards during The Name Game round, which originally saw Gary's team docked 3 points, but at the start of the following show, it was revealed that following more complaints, Gary's team were disqualified and the win was given to David's team.)
09x03	4 May 2000	Gabby Yorath	Jo Brand	14–12
09x04 (Note: Following the "debacle" involving the incident 2 shows previously, Gary was dropped as team captain for this episode for "bringing the show into disrepute".)	11 May 2000	John Toshack	Mark Lawrenson, Neil Morrissey	17–16 (Note: The episode finished 16–16, so the team captains were asked to guess what percentage of refereeing decisions, according to a five-year study of refereeing decisions in over 40,000 football matches by sociology teacher Alan Briscoe, favoured Manchester United. Mark guessed 55%, while David guessed 56%; the correct answer was 87%, making David's team the winners.)
09x05	18 May 2000	Clive Lloyd	Rory Bremner	14–18
09x06	25 May 2000	Shane Warne	Iain Lee	11–17
09x07	1 June 2000	Paul Kaye	Mark Richardson	14–17
09x08	8 June 2000	Linford Christie	Mark Little	16–14 (Note: For a series tiebreaker, Nick Hancock asked Gary to name the title of any story in Gary Lineker's Favourite Football Stories. As he was unable to do so, the series was awarded to David's team.)

=== Series 10 ===
Index	Air date	David & Jonathan's guest	Gary & Rory's guest	Score
10x01	24 November 2000	Steve Davis, Matthew Pinsent	Arthur Smith	14–19
10x02	1 December 2000	Patrick Kielty	Frankie Dettori	17–13
10x03	8 December 2000	Junior Simpson	Kirsty Gallacher	18–19
10x04	15 December 2000	Ian Wright, Gordon Ramsay	Dave Gorman	16–17 (Note: The game originally ended 16–16, so for a tiebreaker Jonathan and Rory took turns on a mechanical bull. Rory lasted longer with 20 seconds to Jonathan's 15 so Gary's team were declared the winners.)
10x05	22 December 2000	Jason Queally	Johnny Vegas	12–18 (Note: After it was revealed that Rory had bribed the autocue writer with champagne for the answers to several previous questions, Nick disqualified Gary's team and awarded the episode to David's team.)
10x06	24 December 2000 (Note: All the panellists are dressed as pantomime characters. Gail Porter also appears as a Christmas fairy in-between rounds.)	Frank Bruno	Omid Djalili	16–17 (Note: The episode finished 16–16, so David and Gary engaged in a bout of mashed potato wrestling as a tiebreaker, with the audience declaring Gary the winner.)
10x07	5 January 2001	Ashley Giles	Audley Harrison	12–17 (Note: Gary and Rory's team were disqualified as it was revealed that before Christmas Rory had tried to bribe the show's new guest booker.)
10x08	12 January 2001	Steve Davis, Clare Balding	Steve Backley, Andy Parsons	18–13
10x09	19 January 2001	Linda Smith	Darren Campbell	16–17
10x10	30 March 2001	Compilation episode – Top 30 Moments from Series 1–10		

=== Series 11 ===
Index	Air date	David & Jonathan's guest	Gary & Rory's guest	Score
11x01	4 May 2001	Stan Collymore	Mark James	17–16
11x02	11 May 2001	Tanni Grey-Thompson	Chris Eubank	17–16
11x03	18 May 2001	Ralf Little	Dion Dublin	18–19
11x04	25 May 2001	Pat Cash	Mick Miller	17–16 (Note: The episode finished 16–16, so the teams were tasked with determining how long Greg Rusedski's serve would take to reach the Moon. Jonathan's guess of a day and a half was closer to the correct answer of 72 days than Rory's guess of 765 days.)
11x05	1 June 2001	Rich Hall	Jonah Lomu	18–19
11x06	8 June 2001	Steve Davis, Dean Macey	Jon Culshaw	12–13 (Note: The episode finished 12–12, so Jonathan and Rory played a tiebreaker in which they competed to see who could remain face down in a bowl of water while holding their breath for the longest, with Rory winning.)
11x07	15 June 2001	Jayne Torvill	Richie Benaud	14–11
11x08	21 June 2001	Allan Border	Sean Hughes	10–26 (Note: Because David and Gary had won four games each, they played a sumo bout in inflatable costumes for a tiebreaker, with Gary winning.)

=== Series 12 ===
Index	Air date	David & Jonathan's guest	Gary & Rory's guest	Score
12x01	7 September 2001	Ed Byrne	Shane Warne	18–17
12x02	14 September 2001	Nasser Hussain	Hazel Irvine	15–16 (Note: The episode finished 15–15, so Nasser Hussain was asked to decide the game by calling a coin toss; he guessed heads, while the coin landed tails up, making Gary's team the winners.)
12x03	21 September 2001	Ricky Tomlinson	David Elleray	12–17 (Note: Despite originally winning these episodes, Gary and Rory's team were retrospectively deducted three points in the fifth episode of series 12 after it was discovered Rory had been cheating by looking at answers before the show's recording, David and Jonathan's team were therefore declared the winners for both shows.)
12x04	28 September 2001	Audley Harrison	Fiona Allen	16–17
12x05	5 October 2001	Alec Stewart	Clive Anderson	17–14
12x06	12 October 2001 (Note: The 100th episode. David Gower and Gary Lineker switched places for this episode as Gary Lineker and Rory McGrath were caught cheating the week before.)	Lawrence Dallaglio, Rory McGrath	Paul Merson, Jonathan Ross	17–18 (Note: The episode finished 17–17, so David, Rory, Gary, and Jonathan played a tiebreaker game of musical chairs, with Jonathan winning the game for Gary's team.)
12x07	19 October 2001	Paula Radcliffe	Ben Norris	19–21
12x08	26 October 2001	Austin Healey	Paul Ross	14–20 (Note: As both teams had won four episodes in the series, a tiebreaker was played in which brothers Jonathan and Paul Ross competed to see who could stay on a surfing practice machine for longest; Paul won by staying on for 13 seconds to Jonathan's 9 seconds, handing victory for the series to Gary's team.)
12x09	23 December 2001	Steve Davis	Mark Lawrenson	16–17

=== Series 13 ===
Index	Air date	David & Jonathan's guest	Gary & Rory's guest	Score
13x01	18 January 2002	Ronnie O'Sullivan	Steve Davis, (Note: Paul Merson was to guest captain, but had to pull out as his partner had just given birth.) Mike Gatting	15–13
13x02	25 January 2002	Matthew Pinsent, Damon Hill	Steve Davis, Beverley Turner	13–17
13x03	1 February 2002	Matthew Pinsent, John Francome	Steve Davis, Jo Brand	15–16 (Note: David's team were declared the winners in the following episode after Rory was accused of cheating during this episode.)
13x04	8 February 2002	Ulrika Jonsson	Linford Christie, (Note: Again, Paul Merson was to guest-captain, but pulled out after being taken ill.) Phil Tufnell	14–15
13x05	15 February 2002	Kevin Flynn (Note: A former American soccer player turned comedian and broadcaster.)	James Cracknell	14–18
13x06	22 February 2002	Mick McCarthy	Suggs	14–18
13x07	1 March 2002	Frank Maloney	Dominic Holland	15–11
13x08 (Note: As David and Gary had won four games each, they competed in a tiebreaker race for the series on practice skeleton bobsleds, with Gary winning.)	8 March 2002	Barry Davies	Junior Simpson	33–7 1/2 (Note: Gary's team were docked 3 points for cheating during "What's Going On?", while 20 points were awarded to David's team. Gary's team managed to get half a point back for answering David's "Celebrations" question.)

=== Series 14 ===
Index	Air date	David & Jonathan's guest	Gary & Rory's guest	Score
14x01	6 September 2002	Brad Friedel	Jon Culshaw	16–12
14x02	13 September 2002	Arthur Smith	Tony McCoy	13–17
14x03	20 September 2002	Sharron Davies	Mark Waugh	18–19
14x04	27 September 2002	Tony Gubba	Tracy Edwards	22–16
14x05	4 October 2002	Kirsty Gallacher	Mick McCarthy, John Parrott	16–15
14x06	11 October 2002	Ashia Hansen	Suzi Perry	14–19 (Note: As David and Gary had won three games each, all six panellists participated in a round the table game of table tennis to decide the series. David was the last man standing, handing his team the series win.)
14x07	12 December 2002	2002 Highlights (Part 1)		
14x08	19 December 2002	2002 Highlights (Part 2)		
14x09	22 December 2002 (Note: A variety of party games were played throughout the episode, including "Pin the Tail on the David Seaman", Hide-and-seek (in the studio audience) and Test Your Strength.)	Steve Davis, Phil Tufnell	Steve Cram	14–13 (Note: Gary's team were docked 10 points when Gary peeked at his team's answers for "The Name Game", and when he read off the answers he had copied down, the adjudicators blew the whistle for full time after only 50 of the usual 90 seconds.)

=== Series 15 ===
Index	Air date	David & Jonathan's guest	Gary & Rory's guest	Score
15x01	3 January 2003 (Note: 70s Special. Everyone was dressed in 1970s clothes. Jonathan Ross dressed as Aladdin Sane.)	Ilie Năstase	Francis Lee	15–20
15x02	10 January 2003 (Note: 80s Special. Everyone was dressed in 1980s clothes. Nick Hancock wore a mullet wig, Jonathan Ross dressed as Adam Ant and Rory McGrath as Boy George.)	Stephen Hendry	Kriss Akabusi	19–14
15x03	17 January 2003	Sharron Davies, Richard Burns	Ricky Hatton	17–18
15x04	24 January 2003	Tanya Streeter	Dominic Cork	14–19
15x05	5 February 2003	Barry Fry	Phill Jupitus	16–15
15x06	12 February 2003	Joe Calzaghe	Fred MacAulay	20–16
15x07	19 February 2003	Steve Davis, Steve Rider	Ronnie O'Sullivan	17–18 (Note: The episode finished 17–17, so Steve Davis and Ronnie O'Sullivan played a tiebreaking game of snooker on a toy table on which only the black ball remained to be potted, with Ronnie winning. However, the following week, Gary's team were caught having looked at the answers to their "Excuses" question in advance, and Nick Hancock announced that he was docking them two victories. But as they were announced to be trailing by just one game at the beginning of the series finale, the penalty was apparently reduced to one victory.)
15x08	26 February 2003	Sharron Davies, Graeme Le Saux	Dave Fulton	13–12 (Note: The episode originally finished 17–12, but Sharron's team were docked 5 points for cheating during "The Name Game". The episode's tiebreaker involved launching football boots at cutouts of David Beckham's head, with Graeme Le Saux the only panellist to do so successfully, winning the episode for Sharron's team.)
15x09	4 March 2003	Steve Davis, Rich Hall	Sam Torrance, Gary Speed	9–18
15x10	11 March 2003	Sharron Davies, Roger Black	Graham Poll	8–17 (Note: As Gary and his opposing captains had won five games each, for a series tiebreaker, the teams had to guess how many sexually deviant acts Rory had been implied to have committed in the first fifteen series. Jonathan's guess of "the high 50s" was closer than Gary's guess of 427 to the actual answer of 74, handing David's team the series win.)

=== Series 16 ===
Index	Air date	Phil & Jonathan's guest	David & Rory's guest	Score
16x01	16 September 2003	Graeme Le Saux	Ed Smith	21–16
16x02	23 September 2003	Katharine Merry	Neil Ruddock	17–16
16x03	30 September 2003	Jonathan Davies	Shane Warne	16–18
16x04	7 October 2003	Kirsty Gallacher	Jodie Kidd	16–19
16x05	14 October 2003	Iwan Thomas	Jimmy Greaves	13–14
16x06	21 October 2003	James Gibson	Antony Worrall Thompson	19–14
16x07	28 October 2003	Vernon Kay	Phil Greening	19–18
16x08	4 November 2003	Jenson Button	Phill Jupitus	12–17 (Note: Having won four games each, Phil Tufnell and David Seaman played a tiebreaker for the series by seeing which of them could fish the most plastic fish out of a paddling pool in one minute; Phil was the winner with five fish to David's two.)

=== Series 17 ===
Index	Air date	Phil & Jonathan's guest	David & Rory's guest	Score
17x01	9 January 2004	Barry McGuigan	Thomas Castaignède	18–17
17x02	16 January 2004	Katy Sexton	Chris Tarrant	13–19
17x03	23 January 2004	Matthew Pinsent	Mark Butcher	12–13
17x04	30 January 2004	John Virgo	Richard Hammond	17–16
17x05	6 February 2004	Chris Rawlinson	John Inverdale	17–16
17x06	14 February 2004	Matt Le Tissier	Phil Taylor	16–13
17x07	21 February 2004	Lee Dixon	Lee Hurst	11–13
17x08	28 February 2004	Scott Gibbs	Jamie Baulch	15–21 (Note: Although Phil's team had won four of the first seven games, it was David's team who were announced to be leading by four games to three at the beginning of the series finale, and their win in this episode handed them a win for the series.)

=== Series 18 ===
Index	Air date	Phil & Jonathan's guest	Ian & Rory's guest	Score
18x01	2 September 2004	Tommy Docherty	Adam Woodyatt	22–19
18x02	9 September 2004	Alastair Campbell	Will Carling	20–23
18x03	16 September 2004	Sharron Davies	Paul Robinson	19–20
18x04	23 September 2004	Sean Lock	Ainsley Harriott	17–18
18x05	30 September 2004	Michael Johnson	Dickie Davies	23–24
18x06	18 October 2004	Jodie Kidd	Suzi Perry	18–17
18x07	25 October 2004	Andrew Castle	Phill Jupitus	19–22
18x08	1 November 2004	Beverley Turner	Ronnie O'Sullivan	25–24

=== Series 19 ===
Index	Air date	Boris & Jonathan's guest	Ian & Rory's guest	Score
19x01	24 October 2005	Nasser Hussain	Jermain Defoe	11–17
19x02	31 October 2005	Helen Chamberlain	Frankie Boyle	20–16
19x03	7 November 2005	Nigel Benn	Sharron Davies	13–15
19x04	14 November 2005	Frankie Dettori	Beverley Turner	11–15
19x05	21 November 2005	Ronnie O'Sullivan	Phil Daniels	17–16
19x06	28 November 2005	Michael Johnson, Jodie Kidd	Les Ferdinand	11–17
19x07	5 December 2005	Martin Offiah	Darren Gough	16–15
19x08	12 December 2005	Matthew Hoggard	Suzi Perry	14–15

=== 2006 specials ===
Index	Air date	Boris & Sean's guest	Ian & Rory's guest	Score
Sp. 01	2 June 2006 (Note: World Cup Special)	Steffen Freund	Glenn Hoddle	16–17 (Note: The episode finished 16–16, so Boris and Ian played a game of blow football against each other, with Ian winning by scoring a goal first.)
Sp. 02	9 June 2006 (Note: Summer Special)	Tony Woodcock	James Alexandrou	20–19

=== Comic Relief Special ===
Index	Air date	Dave Berry's guests	Richard Bacon's guests	Score
Sp.	6 March 2011 (Note: Comic Relief Special episode webcast live as part of 24 Hour Panel People. Nick Hancock reprised his role as host for this episode only.)	David Walliams, Lee Hurst	Gabby Logan, Phil Tufnell	13–15

== Scores ==
David Gower	Phil	Boris	Gary	David Seaman	Ian
Series wins ( drawn)
8			11		
7	1	0	8	1	2
Episode wins (1 drawn)
71			81		
56	11	4	62	8	11
