= TV Heaven, Telly Hell =

- Genre: Comedy
- Presented by: Sean Lock
- Country of origin: United Kingdom
- Original language: English
- No. of series: 2
- No. of episodes: 12

Production
- Running time: 24 Minutes
- Production company: Objective Productions

Original release
- Network: Channel 4
- Release: 26 March 2006 – 27 August 2007

Related
- Room 101; Comic's Choice

TV Heaven, Telly Hell is a comedy television show on Channel 4, presented and produced by Sean Lock. The format is similar to Room 101, with guests discussing their likes and dislikes of items on television.

The show also allows the guest to reconstruct any moment in television history in the way they wanted it to happen, in a short sketch shown at the end of the show usually parodying a clip discussed earlier.

== Guests ==
=== Series 1 ===
Guest	Air Date	TV Heaven	Telly Hell	Reconstructed Moment
Alan Davies	26 March 2006	The Littlest Groom; Aerobics Oz Style	Vet shows, particularly Animal Hospital; British Comedy Awards	Winning something at the British Comedy Awards
Johnny Vegas	2 April 2006	The F***ing Fulfords; QVC; Keith Floyd	Celebrity Poker Club; Sex and the City	Reacting really angrily at losing Celebrity Poker Club
Johnny Vaughan	9 April 2006	The Outcasts (a documentary on a British biker gang); Jeff Stelling from Soccer Saturday	Reverend Peter Owen-Jones from The Battle for Britain's Soul; Makeover shows such as Ricki Lake; The evictions on Big Brother	Being trapped inside a cardboard box, as on Big Brother 6
Bill Bailey	16 April 2006	Cane Toads: An Unnatural History	Alistair McGowan goes Wild with Rhinos; Last Night of the Proms; Brian May at Party at the Palace	Bailey as Brian May and Lock as the Queen at Party at the Palace
Nick Hancock	23 April 2006	Neighbours; Fishing programmes, particularly The Fishing Party	Trinny and Susannah	Taking part in a slightly pornographic fishing programme
David Mitchell	30 April 2006	Adam Hart-Davis; Terry and June	The Heaven and Earth Show; Judge John Deed	The opening titles of Terry and June, with Mitchell as Terry and Lock as June

=== Series 2 ===
Guest	Air Date	TV Heaven	Telly Hell	Reconstructed Moment
Jack Dee	23 July 2007	Tinker Tailor Soldier Spy	City Hospital It's a Knockout; A Question of Sport	A scene from Tinker Tailor Soldier Spy with Dee as George Smiley
Alan Carr	30 July 2007	Ramsay's Kitchen Nightmares; Dead Body Squad	The Mint; 10 Years Younger	A makeover in the style of Ten Years Younger with Carr as a Boy Scout
Lee Mack	6 August 2007	Stars in Their Eyes; Rod Hull and Emu; The Indoor League	Arkin Salih from Are We Being Served?	A Stars in their Eyes sketch with Mack as Limahl and a guest appearance from the actual Limahl
Jimmy Carr	13 August 2007	Jeremy Clarkson; Flavor of Love	Derek Acorah; Babestation	A woman's Babestation, called Manstation
Omid Djalili	20 August 2007	The Tomorrow People; Brideshead Revisited	Jeremy; Inside the Actors Studio	A re-enactment of the Inside the Actors Studio episode with Djalili as Tom Cruise
Ronni Ancona	27 August 2007	Friends; Lamb Chop	Ladette to Lady; Casualty	A spoof of Casualty with Ancona and Lock as an accident prone couple
