= They Think It's All Over (TV series) =

British television comedy panel game (1995–2006)

- Genre: Comedy panel game
- Created by: Bill Matthews; Simon Bullivant
- Presented by: Des Lynam (1992–1994)(Radio); Nick Hancock (1995–2004)(TV); Lee Mack (2005–2006) (TV)
- Starring: Team Captains; David Gower (1995–2003); Gary Lineker (1995–2003); Phil Tufnell (2003–2004); David Seaman (2003–2004); Ian Wright (2004–06); Boris Becker (2005–06); Regular Panellists; Rory McGrath (1995–2006); Lee Hurst (1995–97); Jonathan Ross (1999–2005); Sean Lock (2006)
- Country of origin: United Kingdom
- Original language: English
- No. of series: 19
- No. of episodes: 154 (list of episodes)

Production
- Running time: 30 minutes
- Production company: Talkback

Original release
- Network: BBC Radio 5 (1992–94); BBC One (1995–2006)
- Release: 14 September 1995 – 9 June 2006

They Think It's All Over is a British comedy panel game with a sporting theme produced by Talkback and shown on BBC1. The show's name was taken from Kenneth Wolstenholme's 1966 World Cup commentary line, "they think it's all over...it is now!" and the show used the phrase to sign off each episode. The show was originally broadcast from 1995 to 2006.

== Overview ==
The show was originally presented by comedian Nick Hancock. Retired England football team captain Gary Lineker and former England cricket team captain David Gower were team captains from 1995 until they announced their retirement from the show in 2003. They were replaced as team captains by former England football goalkeeper David Seaman and former England cricketer Phil Tufnell. Former footballer Ian Wright took over from David Seaman in autumn 2004. From October 2005, Boris Becker replaced Tufnell and Lee Mack took over from Hancock as host.

Occasionally, a team captain was unable to appear on the show due to other commitments so guest captains were drafted in. Six times World Snooker Champion Steve Davis was a regular choice as guest captain, while Matthew Pinsent, Mark Lawrenson, Mick McCarthy, Sam Torrance, Steve Backley, Sharron Davies, Linford Christie and Michael Johnson also appeared in this role. Additionally, Ian Wright was a guest captain before becoming a permanent team captain.

Each team also had a regular panellist. For the team which was originally captained by Gary Lineker this was Rory McGrath for the show's entire run. David Gower was originally teamed up with Lee Hurst. Hurst left the show in 1997 (although he made a reappearance in 2004 on David Seaman's team) and was replaced for the next two series by Jonathan Ross, Jo Brand, Alan Davies, Julian Clary and Phill Jupitus. Despite regularly admitting to having limited sporting knowledge, Ross became the permanent panellist until leaving the show in 2006, and was replaced by Sean Lock for the World Cup and summer sports special editions. The third member of each team varied from week to week, and would typically be a notable sportsperson, broadcaster or comedian.

The show was originally produced for BBC Radio 5, where it was hosted by Des Lynam. The devisers, Simon Bullivant and Bill Matthews, started work on a TV version in 1993 but it was two years before it made it to air. Lynam did record a pilot in early 1994 but decided not to do the already commissioned series, which was then put on hold.

In 1999 and 2001, as part of the BBC's Comic Relief broadcasts, one-off special programmes were made called Have I Got Buzzcocks All Over. They combined elements of the show with Have I Got News for You and Never Mind the Buzzcocks, with Angus Deayton as host. In 2002 and 2004, as part of the BBC's Sport Relief broadcasts, one-off special programmes were made called They Think It's All A Question of Sport. They combined elements of the show with A Question of Sport, with Stephen Fry as host.

Kenneth Wolstenholme was unhappy with the use of the phrase for the title of the show. He wrote in his autobiography that he had contacted the BBC to find out what relevance the show had to his line. However, when the show was first commissioned, he did accept a fee to re-record his commentary for the opening titles, as the original was unusable.

== Controversies ==
=== Fatima Whitbread ===
During an episode aired on 13 May 1999, two panellists on the show suggested that javelin thrower Fatima Whitbread had "unnaturally high levels of testosterone in her blood". Whitbread sued for libel and in November 1999, she accepted a public apology along with an undisclosed libel damages payment.

=== Luke Chadwick ===
In May 2020, Luke Chadwick spoke to the media on how being mocked for his looks on the show repeatedly had affected his mental health. He said how the show commented on "spots on my face, teeth sticking out, that sort of thing" and how the repetition of the comments "wore him down" and made him anxious. Nick Hancock was interviewed by BBC Breakfast and apologised saying: "I'm appalled for him and at myself. When I hear him speaking, I'm full of admiration for the present Luke Chadwick and full of sympathy for the young Luke Chadwick, and personally I just feel a great deal of responsibility and shame, which I do accept and have to hold my hands up to." Upon the story breaking, Gary Lineker apologised to Chadwick on Twitter. Chadwick accepted both of their apologies.

== Home media ==
=== VHS ===
Release name	Release date	References
No Holds Barred	4 November 1996	
Full Throttle (aka Grand Prixxx)	3 November 1997	
Below the Belt (aka Off The Bone)	2 November 1998	
Ungentlemanly Conduct (aka New Balls)	13 November 2000	

=== DVDs ===
Release name	Release date	References
The Very Best of They Think It's All Over - A Game of Three Halves	28 November 2005	
Interactive Game	12 November 2007	
