= Jeff Green (comedian) =

English stand-up comedian and writer

- Born: 23 February 1964 (age 62); Chester, England

Comedy career
- Medium: Television, radio and stand-up.
- Website: Official website

Jeff Green (born 23 February 1964 in Chester) is an English stand-up comedian and writer. He lives in Melbourne with his wife and two children.

== Stand-up ==
Green appears in stand-up festivals. His first solo tour in the United Kingdom sold out, and was broadcast on the ITV network.

== Television and radio ==
His first TV stand-up show Jeff Green Live, recorded at Her Majesty's Theatre, was shown on the ITV network on 29 December 1996. His second ITV show Jeff Green Up West recorded at Gielgud Theatre was shown in May 1997. Both shows were watched by over 3 million viewers. Back From The Bewilderness his third stand-up show recorded in 2003 at Gielgud Theatre has been shown several times on The Paramount Comedy Channel.

He has appeared in several BBC television panel games and shows, such as Jo Brand's Hot Potatoes, Never Mind the Buzzcocks, They Think It's All Over, and Have I Got News for You. He has also made appearances on ITV's daytime show This Morning, on Australian TV in Spicks and Specks and on New Zealand TV in 7 days. In 2002 he provided the voice-over for The Football Years on Sky One. In August 2007 his six-part series The Green Guide to Life was broadcast on BBC Radio 2.

Green appeared in series three of the BBC Radio 4 stand up show 4 Stands Up in April 2009.

Green featured in a series of GCSE English Literature Podcasts for BBC Bitesize, and featured on Michael McIntyre's Comedy Roadshow on 4 July 2009.

In 2010 he was a team captain on Bill Bailey's Birdwatching Bonanza.

In 2018, he appeared on Royal Caribbean's Radiance of the Seas sailing the South Pacific islands as the major headliner in the main theater.

== Writer ==
His first book, The A-Z of Living Together was a commercial and critical success, reaching the fifth spot of the Sunday Times Bestsellers List and remaining in the top ten for five weeks. His follow-up books were titled: The A-Z of Being Single and The A-Z of Having a Baby. All three books have been translated into several languages including Polish, Portuguese, Finnish, Serbian, and Spanish. He has also written stand-up material for Jo Brand, Jack Dee, Steve Coogan and Lee Evans.
