= Bill Bailey =

British musician and comedian (born 1965)

Bill Bailey MBE
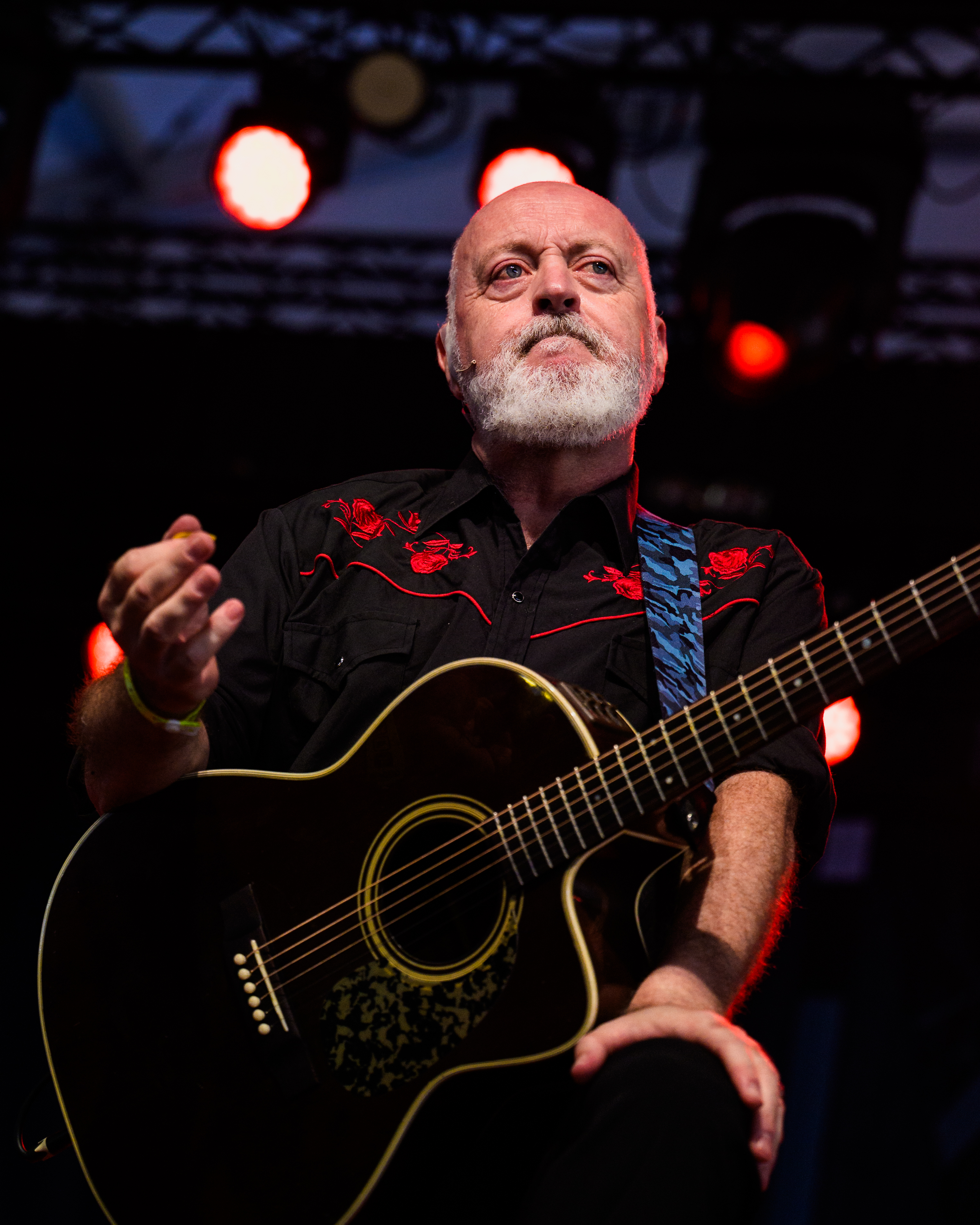
- Bailey at Tons of Rock in 2026
- Born: Mark Robert Bailey; 13 January 1965 (age 61); Keynsham, Somerset, England
- Education: Westfield College; London College of Music
- Spouse: Kristin Brunt (m. 1998)
- Children: 1

Comedy career
- Years active: 1989–present
- Genres: Musical comedy, political satire, surreal humour
- Bill Bailey's voice Bailey speaking on Front Row in November 2010
- Website: billbailey.co.uk

Mark Robert "Bill" Bailey (born 13 January 1965) is an English musician, comedian, actor and television presenter. He is known for his role as Manny in the sitcom Black Books (2000–2004), and for his regular appearances on the panel shows Never Mind the Buzzcocks, Have I Got News for You, and QI, as well as for his stand-up comedy work. He plays a variety of musical instruments and incorporates music into his performances.

Bailey was listed by The Observer as one of the 50 funniest acts in British comedy in 2003. In 2007, and again in 2010, he was voted the seventh greatest stand-up comic on Channel 4's 100 Greatest Stand-Ups. He made an appearance in the film Hot Fuzz. In 2020, he won the eighteenth series of the televised BBC dancing competition Strictly Come Dancing with his professional partner Oti Mabuse. Then aged 55, he became the oldest winner in the show's history. He is a cancer fundraiser and has walked 100 miles for cancer fundraising in honour of his mother, who died in 2005, as well as raising awareness for prostate cancer through television, print, and digital ads. Bailey was awarded an honorary doctorate by the University of Bath on 11 July 2018. In 2024, he became a patron of the Musical Comedy Awards. He has written works including Bill Bailey's Remarkable Guide to British Birds, Bill Bailey's Remarkable Guide to Happiness, and My Animals, and Other Animals, a memoir of sorts.

== Early life ==
Mark Robert Bailey was born on 13 January 1965 in Keynsham, Somerset, son of Christopher and Madryn Bailey. His father was an NHS general practitioner "who ran a little surgery in the front of the house", and his mother a hospital ward nurse. Until 2018, when he revealed the correct date, his birthday was wrongly recorded by the media as 24 February. He spent most of his childhood in Keynsham, a town between Bath and Bristol. His maternal grandparents lived in an annexe built on the side of the house by his maternal grandfather, who was a stonemason and builder. Two rooms at the front of the family house were for his father's surgery.

Bailey was educated at King Edward's School, an independent school in Bath, where he was a highly intelligent, academic pupil. At about the age of 15, he joined the school band called Behind Closed Doors, which played mostly original work. He is a classically trained musician, and was the only pupil at his school to study A-level music, which he passed with an A grade. He also states he was good at sport and was the captain of the KES 2nd XI cricket team in 1982, and would often combine music and sport by leading the singing on the long coach trip back from away rugby fixtures. It was here that he was given the nickname Bill by his music teacher for being able to play the song "Won't You Come Home Bill Bailey" so well on the guitar.

Bailey started studies for an English degree at Westfield College of the University of London, but left after a year. He received an Associate Diploma from the London College of Music. He was also made an honorary member of the Society of Crematorium Organists. He performed with a boy band called The Famous Five. Acting roles included a part in a Workers' Revolutionary Party stage production called The Printers with Vanessa Redgrave and Frances de la Tour.

== Career ==
=== Early stand-up ===
Bailey began touring the country with comedians such as Mark Lamarr. In 1984, he formed a double act, the Rubber Bishops, with Toby Longworth. It was there that Bailey began developing his own style, mixing in musical parodies with deconstructions of or variations on traditional jokes. Longworth moved on in 1989, joining the Royal Shakespeare Company (RSC), and was replaced by Martin Stubbs.

Stubbs later quit, and in 1994 Bailey performed Rock at the Edinburgh Festival Fringe with Sean Lock, a show about an ageing rockstar and his roadie, script-edited by comedy writer Jim Miller. It was later serialised for the Mark Radcliffe show on BBC Radio 1. The show's attendances were not impressive and on one occasion the only person in the audience was comedian Dominic Holland. Bailey almost gave up comedy to take up a telesales job.

He went solo the next year with the one-man show Bill Bailey's Cosmic Jam. Bailey combined his post-modern jokes with music in his whimsical rambling style at the Bloomsbury Theatre in London, which was broadcast in 1997 on Channel 4 as a one-hour special called Bill Bailey Live.

After supporting Donna McPhail in 1995 and winning a Time Out award, he returned to Edinburgh in 1996 with a show that was nominated for the Perrier Comedy Award.

Bailey won Best Live Stand-Up award at the British Comedy Awards in 1999.

=== Television ===
In 1998, he wrote and presented the BBC television show, Is It Bill Bailey? Bailey's television debut had been on the children's show Motormouth in the late 1980s, playing piano for a mind-reading dog. Bailey reminisced about the experience on the BBC show Room 101 with Paul Merton in 2000. In 1991, he was appearing in stand-up shows such as The Happening, Packing Them In, The Stand Up Show and The Comedy Store. He also appeared as captain on two panel games, an ITV music quiz pilot called Pop Dogs, and the Channel 4 science fiction quiz show Space Cadets.

Over the next few years, Bailey made guest appearances on shows such as Have I Got News for You, World Cup Comedy, Room 101, Des O'Connor Tonight, Coast to Coast and three episodes of off-beat Channel 4 sitcom Spaced, in which he played comic-shop manager Bilbo Bagshot. In 1998, Dylan Moran approached him with the pilot script for Black Books, a Channel 4 sitcom about a cold-hearted bookshop owner, his nice-guy assistant, and their socially awkward female friend. It was commissioned in 2000, and Bailey took the part of the assistant Manny Bianco, with Moran playing the owner Bernard and Tamsin Greig the friend, Fran. Three series of six episodes each were made.

When Sean Hughes left his long-term role as a team captain on Never Mind the Buzzcocks in 2002, Bailey became his successor. Host Mark Lamarr continually teased him about his looks and his pre-occupation with woodland animals. On 18 September 2008, it was announced that Bailey would leave the series and be replaced by a series of guest captains including Jack Dee and Dermot O'Leary. While touring in 2009, Bailey joked that the main reason for leaving the show was a lack of desire to continue humming Britney Spears' Toxic to little known figures in the indie music scene. During this time he also left his position as "curator" of the Museum of Curiosity, and declared his intention to "retire" from panel games, although he has since appeared on QI many more times and hosted Have I Got News For You.

Bailey has appeared frequently on the intellectual panel game QI since it began in 2003, alongside host Stephen Fry and regular panellist Alan Davies. He was the winner of the show's unaired pilot episode. Other television appearances include a cameo role in Alan Davies's drama series Jonathan Creek as failing street magician Kenny Starkiss, and obsessed guitar teacher in the "Holiday" episode of Sean Lock's Fifteen Storeys High. He later appeared with Lock again as a guest on his show TV Heaven, Telly Hell. He appeared twice on Friday Night with Jonathan Ross. Bailey also hosted his own show Comic's Choice, which aired in 2011.

Bailey presented Wild Thing I Love You, which began on Channel 4 on 15 October 2006. The series concentrates on the protection of Britain's wild animals, and has included rehoming badgers, owls and water voles.

In 2008, he played Maxxie's dad Walter Oliver in episode one of the second series of the E4 teenage "dramedy" Skins. Bailey helped Kevin McCloud build an eco-friendly home in the first episode of Grand Designs Live on 4 May 2008.

In 2009, Bailey appeared as Cyclops in the BBC show Hustle. In autumn 2009, Bailey presented Bill Bailey's Birdwatching Bonanza.

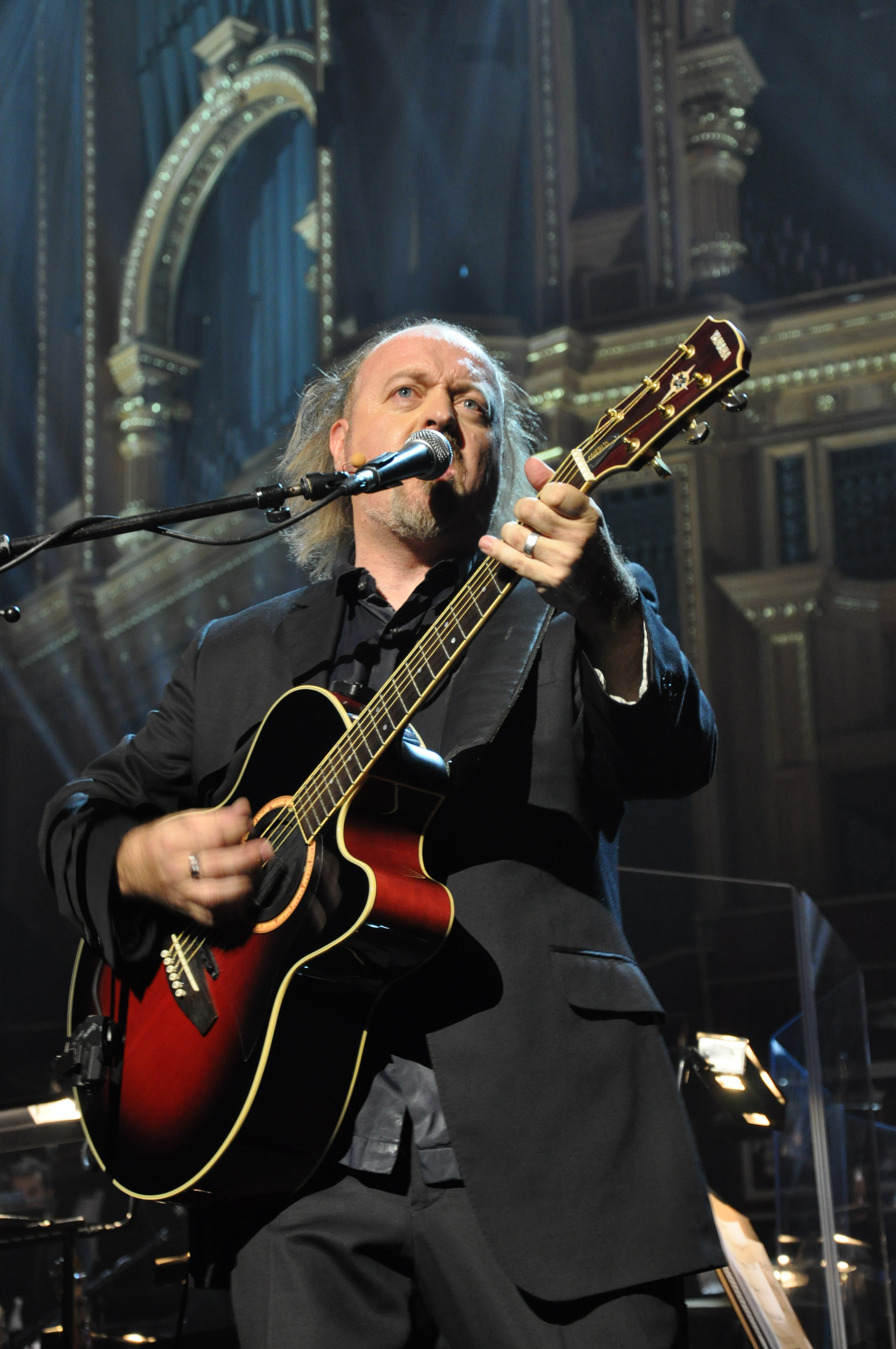
Bailey performing at the Royal Albert Hall in 2008

Continuing his foray into natural history, Bailey presented ITV1's half-hour wildlife mini-series Baboons With Bill Bailey. The series was filmed in Cape Town and spanned eight episodes, with exclusive content available on itvWILD.

Bill Bailey played Droxil, a Harvest Ranger from the Planet Androzani Major, in the 2011 Christmas Special of Doctor Who, titled The Doctor, the Widow and the Wardrobe.

In 2009, Bailey presented a project about the explorer and naturalist Alfred Russel Wallace, in the form of an Indonesian travelogue. Bailey said in an interview that Wallace had been "airbrushed out of history", and that he felt a "real affinity" with him. In 2013, to coincide with the centenary of Wallace's death, Bailey presented a two-part documentary, Bill Bailey's Jungle Hero, first broadcast on BBC Two on 21 and then on 28 April 2013. He travelled around producing and filming the series in Indonesia and Borneo.

Bailey took part in the eighteenth series of the televised dancing competition Strictly Come Dancing, broadcast in late 2020. He won the competition with his partner, Oti Mabuse, becoming the show's oldest winner at 55, displacing the previous oldest winner Joe McFadden. Their win made Mabuse the first dancer to receive the title two years in a row.

Bailey voiced Grandfather Smed in the 2022 short film The Smeds and the Smoos.

=== International tours ===
In 2001, Bailey began touring the globe with Bewilderness. A recording of a performance in Swansea was released on DVD the same year, and the show was broadcast on Channel 4 that Christmas. A modified version of it also proved successful in America, and in 2002 Bailey released a CD of a recording at the WestBeth Theatre in New York City. The show contained his popular music parodies (such as Unisex Chip Shop, a Billy Bragg tribute, which he also performed with Bragg himself at the 2005 Glastonbury Festival), "three men in a pub" jokes (including one in the style of Geoffrey Chaucer) and deconstructions of television themes such as Countdown and The Magic Roundabout. A Bewilderness CD was sold outside gigs, a mixture of studio recordings of songs and monologues Bailey had performed in the past. It was later released in shops as Bill Bailey: The Ultimate Collection... Ever! That same year he also presented a Channel 4 countdown, Top Ten Prog Rock.

Bailey premiered his show Part Troll at the 2003 Edinburgh Festival Fringe. A critical and commercial success, he then transferred it to the West End, where tickets sold out in under 24 hours, and new dates had to be added. He continued to take it on tour all over the UK as well as in Australia, New Zealand, and the US. Bailey expanded on subjects such as the war on Iraq. He also talks extensively about drugs, at one point asking the audience to name different ways of baking cannabis. A DVD was released in 2004.

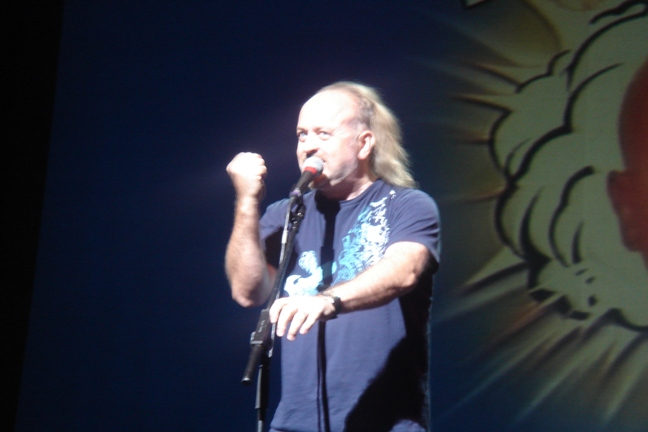
Bill Bailey hosting So You Think You're Funny

His 1995 show Bill Bailey's Cosmic Jam was released in 2005. The two-disc set also contained a director's cut of Bewilderness, which featured a routine on Stephen Hawking's A Brief History of Time not seen in the original version.

Bailey performed a show at the 2006 Edinburgh Festival Fringe entitled Steampunk.

Bailey appeared at the Beautiful Days festival in August 2007. The UK leg of the Tinselworm tour enjoyed three sell-out nights at the MEN Arena in Manchester, Europe's largest indoor arena, and culminated with a sell-out performance at Wembley Arena.

Early in 2007, a petition was started to express fans' wishes to see him cast as a dwarf in The Hobbit films, after his stand-up routine mentioned auditioning for Gimli in The Lord of the Rings. The petition reached its goal in the early days of January, and was sent to the producers. It was hoped that as the Tinselworm tour took him to Wellington where the film was in pre-production, he would be able to audition. Dandelion Mind was released on DVD on 22 November 2010.

In 2012, his world tour entitled Qualmpeddler toured the UK as well as returning to Australia and New Zealand in August and September 2012. In September and October 2018, Bailey took his show, The Earl of Whimsy, to seven venues within New Zealand. In 2021, Bailey took his new show, En Route To Normal, to venues in the United Kingdom and Ireland. In 2022 Bailey took the tour to Europe, and in October to Australia.

=== Music ===
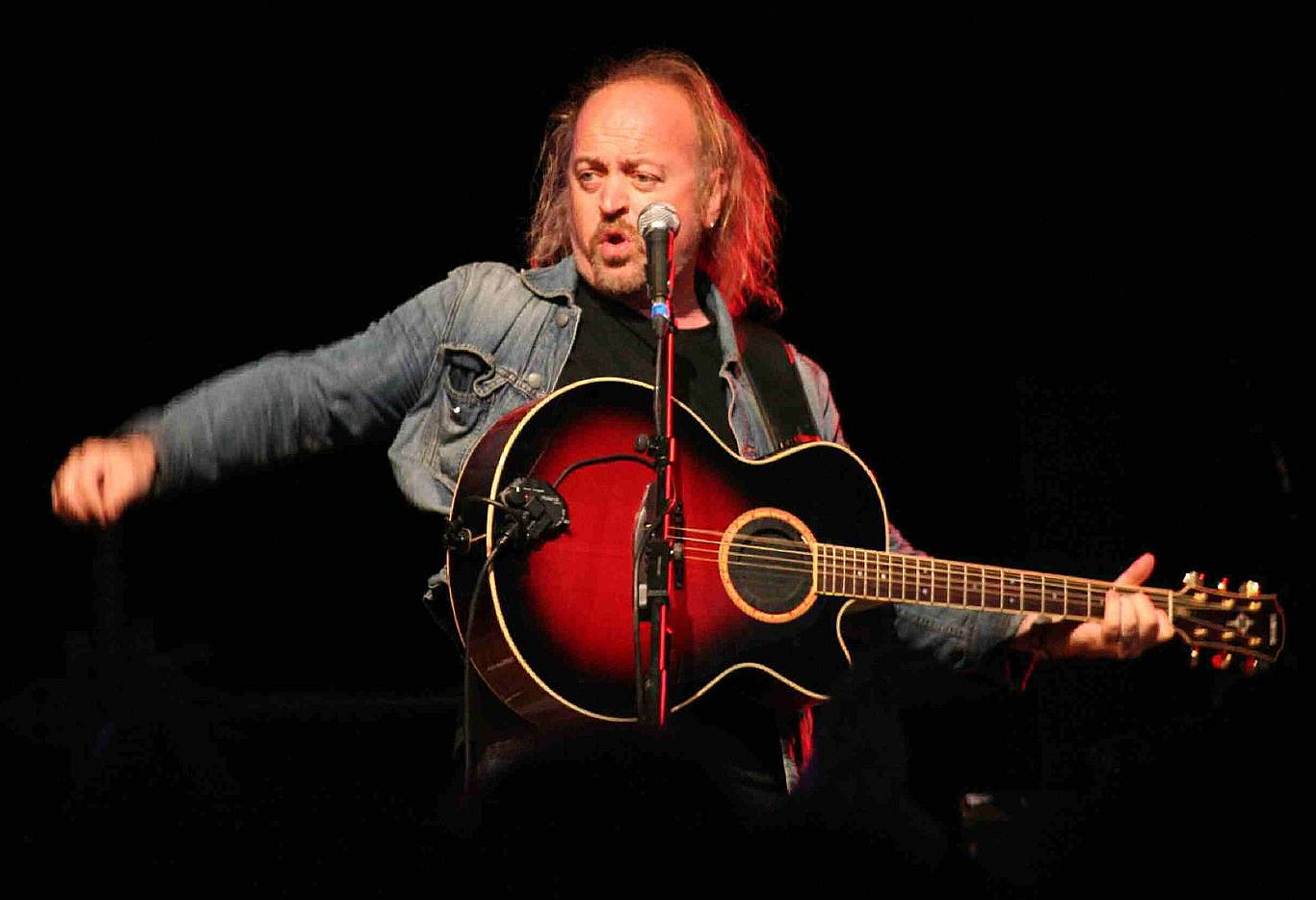
Bailey in concert, 2007

Bailey plays numerous musical instruments, and incorporates music into his comedy. He has perfect pitch. His stand-up routines often feature music from genres such as jazz, rock (most notably prog rock from the early 1970s), drum'n'bass, classical, and even theme songs, usually for comic value. His favourite instruments include the keyboard, guitar, theremin, kazoo and bongos. He also mentioned in an interview that he has achieved Grade 6 Clarinet. He was part of punk band Beergut 100, which he founded in 1995 with comedy writer Jim Miller and which also featured Martin Trenaman and Phil Whelans, with Kevin Eldon as lead singer. The band performed at the 2006 Edinburgh Festival Fringe. His musical routines included performing "The Star-Spangled Banner" in a minor key and the Hokey Cokey in the style of the electronic band Kraftwerk.

In February 2007, Bailey appeared twice with the BBC Concert Orchestra and Anne Dudley in a show entitled Cosmic Shindig. Performed in the Colosseum in Watford on 24 February and in the Queen Elizabeth Hall on 26 February, the show contained orchestrally accompanied versions of many of Bailey's previously performed songs, an exploration of the instruments of the orchestra, and a number of new pieces of music. The Queen Elizabeth Hall performance was broadcast on BBC Radio 3 on 16 March 2007 as a part of Comic Relief 2007.

Bailey had planned to put himself forward as Britain's Eurovision entry in 2008, as a result of several fan petitions encouraging him to do so.

In October 2008, he performed Bill Bailey's Remarkable Guide to the Orchestra at the Royal Albert Hall with the BBC Concert Orchestra, conducted by Anne Dudley.

In November 2009, he was a guest on Private Passions, the biographical music discussion programme on BBC Radio 3.

In July 2011, Bailey performed at the Sonisphere Festival in Knebworth, headlining on the Saturn Stage. He released an album, In Metal, using songs played at Sonisphere, later that year.

In June 2014, The Music House for Children announced Bailey would become their patron alongside Sophie Ellis-Bextor in celebration of their 20th anniversary.

On 13 September 2025 Bailey made his debut at the BBC Proms, with a performance of "The Typewriter" by Leroy Anderson. He later introduced the traditional rendition of "Auld Lang Syne", from the Royal Albert Hall Organ, with phrases from Bach's "Toccata and Fugue" and "The Final Countdown" by Europe. In the same month he presented a series of the BBC podcast Eras about the band Queen.

== Personal life ==
Bailey lives in the Hammersmith area of London with his wife Kristin, whom he married in 1998, on a whim, in Indonesia. In 2009, he said: "We were travelling around Asia and sailed into a place called Banda, with a beautiful lagoon, and a smoking volcano on one side and a Dutch colonial fort, an old church and remains of a little town on the other. We decided to get married there and then." Their son Dax was born in 2003.

For over thirty years (from the early 1990s until 2024), Bailey's trademark look incorporated an armpit-length "skullet" hairstyle. His self-described skullet was a distinctive part of his public persona; extending to his comedic, musical, and acting pursuits. The mystical or shamanic, as well as punk, connotations of Bailey's iconic former look – complementing his often frenetic performing style – generated such commentary as that "his scraggly hair and goatee combination is equal parts Yes roadie and Dark Ages woodcutter". Bailey shaved his hair in June 2024, following a camping incident in which his hair had caught fire.

Bailey supports Queens Park Rangers and describes himself as an avid fan of Star Trek.

He has a carnivorous pitcher plant named after him, Nepenthes x Bill Bailey, created by Borneo Exotics in Sri Lanka. His sporting interests include standup paddleboarding (SUP). He is an active supporter of British Canoeing.

In 2021, Bailey's former collaborator and close personal friend, Sean Lock, died from cancer. In 2023, Bailey worked closely with Channel 4 to create the Sean Lock Comedy Award to honour the memory of Lock.

Bailey has discussed his self-identity and experiences of existential isolation, noting in 2010: "That is how I've seen myself over the years, trying to blend into normal society, but always feeling slightly at odds."

== Political views and activism ==
Bailey is a lifelong supporter of the Labour Party and appeared in its fifth party election broadcast of the 2010 general election campaign. In 2015, he endorsed Jeremy Corbyn's campaign in the Labour Party leadership election, saying, "Corbyn's nomination showed there is a kind of craving for a bit of honest speaking, a bit of principled plain speaking. But I think he is in a bit of a bind. Nuanced debate doesn't cut it in the toxic, political atmosphere. He's having a fast-forward of his own political evolution, having to become 'a politician' – the thing he never was."

Bailey is a feminist and a supporter of the Fawcett Society. He is also a prominent advocate of men's issues, most notably raising awareness of prostate cancer and the Men United campaign. He is a patron of International Animal Rescue and has been instrumental in the organisation's campaign to rescue dancing bears. He has also campaigned for the Sumatran Orangutan Society. For his work in environmental conservation, he received an honorary doctorate in conservation and sustainability from the Australian University of the Sunshine Coast in October 2014.

== Tours ==
Year	Title	Notes
1995	Cosmic Jam	
2001	Bewilderness	
2004	Part Troll	
2006	Steampunk	Edinburgh Festival
2008	Tinselworm	
2008–2009	Bill Bailey Live	Theatre tour with some material from Tinselworm, but mostly new material
2009	Remarkable Guide to the Orchestra	
2010	Dandelion Mind	
2011	Dandelion Mind – Gently Modified	
2012–2013	Qualmpeddler	
2015–2016	Limboland	
2016	Larks in Transit	Australia and New Zealand
2018	Larks in Transit	UK
2018	The Earl of Whimsy	Australia and New Zealand
2021–2022	En Route to Normal	UK, Ireland, Australia, and New Zealand
2023–2025	Thoughtifier	Europe, Australia, New Zealand, UK, and Ireland
2025–2027	Vaudevillean	New Zealand, Australia, UK and Ireland, and Europe

=== DVD releases ===
Title	Released	Notes
Bewilderness	12 November 2001	Live at the Grand Theatre in Swansea
Part Troll	22 November 2004	Live at the Hammersmith Apollo in London
Cosmic Jam	7 November 2005	Live at the Bloomsbury Theatre in London
Tinselworm	10 November 2008	Live at Wembley Arena in London
Remarkable Guide to the Orchestra	23 November 2009	Live at the Royal Albert Hall in London
Dandelion Mind	22 November 2010	Live at the O2 in Dublin
Qualmpeddler	18 November 2013	Live at the Hammersmith Apollo in London
Limboland	26 November 2018	Live at the Hammersmith Apollo in London

=== CD releases ===
Title	Released	Notes
Bewilderness	2000	
The Ultimate Collection... Ever!	2005	Re-release of Bewilderness with an extra track
"Das Hokey Kokey"	2006	CD single
In Metal	2011	Metal style re-recordings of Bill Bailey songs
Billy and the Minpins	2017	Roald Dahl audiobook with "The Magic Finger" read by Kate Winslet

== Filmography ==
- The James Whale Radio Show (TV series) (circa 1990) (Guest)
- Maid Marian and her Merry Men (1992) (Cameo court jester to King John)
- Blue Heaven (1994)
- Asylum (1996)
- Space Cadets (1997) (Regular team captain)
- Is It Bill Bailey? (1998)
- Spaced (1999–2001)
- Have I Got News for You (guest 1999, 2001, 2005; guest presenter 2007, 2008, 2009, 2011)
- Saving Grace (2000)
- Black Books (2000–2004)
- Jonathan Creek
  - "Satan's Chimney" (2001)
  - "The Tailor's Dummy" (2003)
- Wild West (2002–2004)
- Never Mind the Buzzcocks (guest 1999; Regular team captain 2002–2008)
- QI (2003–present) (Frequent guest)
- 15 Storeys High – "The Holiday" (2004)
- The Hitchhiker's Guide to the Galaxy (film) (2005) (Voice of the Sperm Whale)
- The Libertine (Cameo as advisor to Charles II of England)
- Wild Thing I Love You (2006) (Presenter)
- Top Gear (A Star in a Reasonably Priced Car / Fake Angelina Jolie)
- Hot Fuzz (2007)
- Run Fatboy Run (2007) (Cameo)
- Skins (2008) (Cameo as Maxxie Oliver's father)
- Love Soup (2008)
- We Are Most Amused (2008) (One-off special)
- Hustle (as 'Cyclops')
  - "Return of the Prodigal" (2009)
  - "Diamond Seeker" (2009)
  - "Picasso Finger Painting" (2012)
- Steve's World (2009)
- Burke and Hare (2010)
- Bill Bailey's Birdwatching Bonanza (2010)
- Nanny McPhee and the Big Bang (2010)
- Talkin' 'bout Your Generation (2010); one episode
- Jo Brand's Big Splash (2011); one episode
- Chalet Girl (2011)
- Doctor Who – The Doctor, the Widow and the Wardrobe (2011)
- Baboons with Bill Bailey (2011)
- It's Kevin (2013)
- The Secret Life of Evolution (2013)
- The Grand Tour (2018); Celebrity Face Off, Series 2 Episode 5
- The Big Bad Fox and Other Tales... (2018)
- In the Long Run (2018)
- Midsomer Murders (2019); Drawing Dead, Series 20 Episode 3
- Strictly Come Dancing (2020)
- Roald & Beatrix: The Tail of the Curious Mouse (2020)
- My Life Is Murder (2021); Hidden Gems, Season 2 Episode 8
- Patriot Brains (2021); Host & Question Master
- This Is My House (2021)
- Worzel Gummidge (2021); Mr Peregrine, Series 2 Episode 3
- Travel Man: 96 Hours in Iceland (2021)
- The Smeds and the Smoos (2022); Grandfather Smed (Voice role)
- Best and Bester (2022–2023); Grumpy Pants (Voice role)
- Bill Bailey's Master Crafters: The Next Generation (2023), (Presenter)
- Extraordinary Portraits (2023–present), (Presenter)
- Bill Bailey's Australian Adventure (a.k.a. Bill Bailey's Wild Western Australia) (2023), (Presenter)
- Perfect Pub Walks (2024), (Presenter)
- Bring The Drama (2024), (Host)
- Man and Witch: The Dance of a Thousand Steps (2024); Donkey
- Bill Bailey's Vietnam (2026) (Presenter)
- The Reluctant Vampire (2026) as Guy the Gargoyle
- Bill Bailey’s Korea (2026) (Presenter)
- Have You Been Paying Attention? (2026) Guest panelist
- Ingenious (TBA) Host

== Awards and nominations ==
Award	Date	Category	Work	Result	Ref.
1995	Time Out Comedy Awards	Time Out Comedy Award (shared with Sean Lock)		Won	
1996	Edinburgh Festival Fringe	Perrier award		Nominated	
1999	British Comedy Awards	Best Live Stand-Up award		Won	

He was appointed Member of the Order of the British Empire (MBE) in the 2026 New Year Honours for services to entertainment.

== Bibliography ==
- Bill Bailey's Remarkable Guide to British Birds (Quercus, 2018) ISBN 978-1786487131
- Bill Bailey's Remarkable Guide to Happiness (Quercus, 2020) ISBN 978-1529412451
- My Animals, and Other Animals (Quercus, 2024) ISBN 978-1529436143
