= Bill Bailey's Birdwatching Bonanza =

2010 British game show

- Genre: Game show
- Presented by: Bill Bailey
- Starring: Team Captains: Alex Zane; Jeff Green
- Country of origin: United Kingdom
- Original language: English
- No. of series: 1
- No. of episodes: 6 (list of episodes)

Production
- Running time: 60 minutes (inc. adverts)
- Production companies: Fever Media; Glass Box

Original release
- Network: Sky1
- Release: 8 January – 12 February 2010

Bill Bailey's Birdwatching Bonanza is a British game show that is produced by Fever Media and Glass Box that was broadcast on Sky1 between 8 January and 12 February 2010. The show is presented by Bill Bailey who sets two teams birdwatching challenges over a three-day period. The teams are led by Alex Zane and Jeff Green.

== Episode list ==
The coloured backgrounds denote the result of each of the shows:

– indicates Alex's team won
– indicates Jeff's team won
– indicates the game ended in a draw

No.	Alex's guest	Score	Jeff's Guest	Original release date
1	Kara Tointon	3–4	Joe Swash	8 January 2010
2	Sherrie Hewson	3–3	Joe Pasquale	15 January 2010
3	Stephen K. Amos	(Note: The scores were not stated at the end of this episode.)	Camilla Dallerup	22 January 2010
4	Donal MacIntyre		Jayne Middlemiss	29 January 2010
5	Kim Woodburn		Kelvin MacKenzie	5 February 2010
6	Trudie Goodwin	2–3	Josie d'Arby	12 February 2010
