= Room 101 (radio series) =

British radio comedy series

- Logo for the 2023 revival
- Genre: Comedy
- Running time: 30 mins
- Country of origin: United Kingdom
- Language: English
- Home station: BBC Radio 5 (1992–94); BBC Radio 4 (2023–)
- Syndicates: BBC Radio 1; BBC Radio 4 Extra
- TV adaptations: Room 101
- Hosted by: Nick Hancock (1992–94); Paul Merton (2023–)
- Original release: 9 January 1992 – present
- No. of series: 7
- No. of episodes: 51

Room 101 is a radio comedy series on BBC Radio 4 hosted by Paul Merton. Celebrities are invited to discuss their "least favourite people, places and pop songs" in order to have them consigned to Room 101.

== History ==
It originally ran from 1992 to 1994, hosted by Nick Hancock, on BBC Radio 5, before transferring to BBC television in 1994 after Radio 5 was discontinued and replaced by its current format, BBC Radio 5 Live. Hancock was also the first presenter when the series transferred to television.

In January 2023, it was announced that the series would return to radio, this time on BBC Radio 4 and hosted by Paul Merton, who was the first guest on the original radio version and hosted the TV version of the series from 1999 to 2007.

== Episode guide ==
=== Room 101 ===
==== Series One (1992) ====
- Paul Merton (9 January)
- Jenny Eclair (16 January)
- Danny Baker (23 January)
- Arthur Smith (30 January)
- Steve Punt (6 February)
- Annie Nightingale (13 February)

==== Series Two (1992) ====
- Ian Hislop (14 August)
- Jo Brand (21 August)
- Tony Slattery (28 August)
- John Walters (4 September)
- Helen Lederer (11 September)
- David Baddiel (18 September)
- Stephen Frost (25 September)
- Donna McPhail (2 October)

==== Christmas Special (1992) ====
- Nick Hancock (22 December) – Guest host for this episode was Danny Baker

==== Series Three (1993) ====
- Frank Skinner (27 August)
- Trevor and Simon (3 September)
- Caroline Quentin (10 September)
- Tony Hawks (17 September)
- Rory McGrath (8 October)
- Kevin Day (15 October)
- Maria McErlane (22 October)
- Mark Lamarr (29 October)

==== Series Four (1994) ====
- Nick Revell (4 March 1994)
- Simon Delaney (11 March 1994)
- Chris England (18 March 1994)
- Andy Hamilton (25 March 1994)

=== Room 101 with Paul Merton ===
==== Series One (2023) ====
- Claudia Winkleman (24 May 2023)
- Desiree Burch (31 May 2023)
- Steph McGovern (7 June 2023)
- Mark Steel (14 June 2023)
- Phil Wang (21 June 2023)
- Julian Clary (28 June 2023)

==== Series Two (2024) ====
- Chris McCausland (3 April 2024)
- Hannah Fry (10 April 2024)
- Daliso Chaponda (17 April 2024)
- Naga Munchetty (24 April 2024)
- Victoria Coren Mitchell (1 May 2024)
- Gyles Brandreth (8 May 2024)

==== Series Three (2025) ====
- Maisie Adam (5 August 2025)
- Stephen Mangan (12 August 2025)
- Janet Street Porter (19 August 2025)
- Richard Ayoade (26 August 2025)
- Rachel Parris (2 September 2025)
- Jack Dee (9 September 2025)

==== Series Four (2026) ====
- Miles Jupp (12 October 2026)

== Title ==
The title refers to the room in George Orwell's 1949 novel Nineteen Eighty-Four which, for each person, represents the worst fear they can imagine. Appropriately, this is supposedly named after a conference room at BBC Broadcasting House where Orwell used to sit through tedious meetings.

== See also ==
- Room 101 (British TV series)
