= Room 101 (Australian TV series) =

- Genre: Comedy
- Presented by: Paul McDermott
- Country of origin: Australia
- Original language: English
- No. of series: 1
- No. of episodes: 10

Production
- Production company: Matchbox Pictures

Original release
- Network: SBS
- Release: February 23, 2015 – 29 August 2015

Related
- Room 101 (British series)

Room 101 is an SBS One comedy television series hosted by Paul McDermott, based on the British series of the same name, in which celebrities are invited to discuss their dislikes and pet hates. The series was scheduled to premiere on February 23, 2015 but the network decided to delay the launch until July 11, 2015.

The series name is inspired by Room 101, the torture room in George Orwell's 1949 novel Nineteen Eighty-Four which reputedly contained "the worst thing in the world". The series was filmed at the Special Broadcasting Service in the Sydney suburb of Artarmon.

== Episodes ==
No.	Guest	Original release date	Viewers
1	Julia Zemiro	11 July 2015	206,000
2	HG Nelson	11 July 2015	206,000
3	Julia Morris	18 July 2015	184,000
4	Dave Hughes	18 July 2015	184,000
5	Ray Martin	25 July 2015	142,000
6	Poh Ling Yeow	1 August 2015	N/A
7	Matt Preston	8 August 2015	N/A
8	Noni Hazlehurst	15 August 2015	N/A
9	Vince Colosimo	22 August 2015	N/A
10	Nazeem Hussain	29 August 2015	N/A
