= Eras (radio series) =

Eras is a BBC Radio podcast series exploring the careers of notable musicians, first broadcast in 2023 and mostly presented by Radio 2 DJs.

There have been six series with the following subjects:

- Kylie Minogue by Scott Mills
- The Beatles by Martin Freeman
- ABBA by Sara Cox
- Sting (musician) by Vernon Kay
- Bob Marley by Trevor Nelson
- Queen (band) by Bill Bailey
