= Is It Bill Bailey? =

- Title screen
- Created by: Bill Bailey
- Starring: Bill Bailey; Simon Pegg
- No. of series: 1
- No. of episodes: 6

Production
- Producer: BBC Scotland
- Running time: 30 mins

Original release
- Network: BBC Two
- Release: 20 February – 27 March 1998

Is It Bill Bailey? was a stand up/sketch comedy series written by and starring British actor and comedian Bill Bailey, along with Simon Pegg. One series of six episodes was produced and aired on BBC Two in 1998. It was filmed in Glasgow.

It has never been recommissioned or released on DVD. It was to be repeated for the first time since original transmission on Dave from 23 September 2008, but was dropped from the schedules a few days before broadcast.

Each episode featured Bailey performing stand-up comedy on stage, interspersed with sketches starring himself and other actors. As well as performing parodies of pop songs or performers, Bailey would deconstruct music from television shows such as Doctor Who or Starsky and Hutch.

The programme was produced by BBC Scotland and many of the sketches featured Scottish actors such as Forbes Masson and Ford Kiernan. Geraldine McNulty, Norman Lovett and Simon Pegg also featured. Additional material was contributed by frequent collaborators Sean Lock and Martin Trenaman. The shows were directed by Edgar Wright, who went on to direct the sitcom Spaced and the films Shaun of the Dead and Hot Fuzz, all of which starred Simon Pegg. Bailey had a cameo in Hot Fuzz, as well as a small role in Spaced. He was also approached to appear in Shaun of the Dead as a zombie, but was busy with other engagements at the time. Many songs and routines featured in the show were first performed in his Cosmic Jam tour and TV show Asylum, and several were later used during his Bewilderness tour.

The title is derived from the game "Rizla" (also known as "Who Am I?"), in which players are assigned the name of a celebrity or animal and must ask other players yes–no questions to determine who they are. The opening credits of the show depict Bailey with a Rizla on his forehead, bearing his own name.
