= Comic's Choice =

British comedy chat show

- Genre: Chat show Clip show
- Written by: Bill Bailey; Lee Stuart Evans
- Directed by: Peter Orton
- Presented by: Bill Bailey
- Theme music composer: Bill Bailey
- Country of origin: United Kingdom
- Original language: English
- No. of series: 1
- No. of episodes: 5

Production
- Executive producers: Amanda Kean; Mark Brosnan
- Editor: Gavin Ames
- Camera setup: Multi-camera
- Running time: 45 minutes per episode
- Production company: Unique Television

Original release
- Network: Channel 4
- Release: 16 January – 20 January 2011

Comic's Choice is a British comedy chat show hosted by the comedian Bill Bailey, and broadcast on Channel 4. The programme ran for a single series of five episodes, and was shown during January 2011. Each episode, Bailey would interview another British comedian, and invite them to discuss some of their favourite comedians or comedy television programmes. The series was produced by Unique Television Production.

== History ==
Comic's Choice was broadcast in anticipation of the British Comedy Awards, which were being shown on Channel 4 for the first time on 22 January 2011, having been broadcast on ITV for 20 years – Comic's Choice was broadcast in the week leading up the event. The five guests on the show were Alan Davies, Lee Mack, Jo Brand, Jessica Hynes and Sean Lock. Each guest picked three nominations for various British Comedy Award categories (such as Best Sitcom and Best Male Comic), and would then discuss them and select their winner during the episode. Discussing the show, its producers stated: "With other smaller, alternative categories and audience interaction thrown in, the show will be not just informative and entertaining – but fun, funny and memorable."

Reviews of Comic's Choice were generally positive, with Steven Cookson of Suite 101 describing it as "a great deal of fun". Bailey's hosting was praised, with Tom Sutcliffe of The Independent calling him the programme's "saving grace", and stating: "[He's] got a manner that somehow makes the format work." A review of a more critical nature came from Henry Venning of The Stage, who described the show's format as "flimsy" and "confusing".

== Episodes ==
Winners are given in bold. The Guilty Pleasure category had only one nominee.

No.	Title	Directed by	Written by	Original release date
1	"Alan Davies"	Peter Orton	Bill Bailey; Lee Stuart Evans	16 January 2011
Best Male Comic: **Dave Allen**; Noel Fielding; Tony Hancock; Best Comedy Breakthrough Artist: Sacha Baron Cohen; **Chris Morris**; Isy Suttie; Best Comedy Actor: Rik Mayall; Richard Ayoade; **Paul Eddington**; Guilty Pleasure: **It Ain't Half Hot Mum**; Best Comedy Entertainment Programme: **The Morecambe & Wise Show**; Tiswas; The Graham Norton Show
2	"Lee Mack"	Peter Orton	Bill Bailey; Lee Stuart Evans	17 January 2011
Best Male Comic: **Tommy Cooper**; Frank Skinner; Ben Elton; Outstanding Contribution to Comedy: The Comic Strip Presents...; **Peter Cook**; Galton and Simpson; Guilty Pleasure: **Freddie Starr**; Best Comedy Actor: **Steve Coogan**; Leonard Rossiter; Sid James; Best Comedy Entertainment Programme: Shooting Stars; **Friday Night Live**; An Audience with Kenneth Williams
3	"Jo Brand"	Peter Orton	Bill Bailey; Lee Stuart Evans	18 January 2011
Best Female Comic: Beryl Reid; **Victoria Wood**; Morwenna Banks; Best Sitcom: Only Fools and Horses; The Worst Week of My Life; **Pulling**; Best Children's Comedy: Horrible Histories; **Sorry, I've Got No Head**; The Basil Brush Show; Best Comedy Panel Show: **Have I Got News for You**; Would I Lie to You?; QI; Outstanding Contribution to Comedy: **Jerry Sadowitz**; Malcolm Hardee; Hattie Hayridge
4	"Jessica Hynes"	Peter Orton	Bill Bailey; Lee Stuart Evans	19 January 2011
Best Comedy Actress: Celia Imrie; **Julia Davis**; Miranda Richardson; Best Sketch Show: The Fast Show; **French & Saunders**; Big Train; Best British Comedy Performance in Film: Margaret Rutherford in Blithe Spirit; Christopher Guest in This Is Spinal Tap; **Norman Wisdom** in **The Early Bird**; Best Black Comedy: Steptoe and Son; Human Remains; Derek and Clive; The Writers' Guild of Great Britain Award: Craig Cash & Caroline Aherne, The Royle Family; **Noel Fielding** & **Julian Barratt**, **The Mighty Boosh**; Connie Booth & John Cleese, Fawlty Towers
5	"Sean Lock"	Peter Orton	Bill Bailey; Lee Stuart Evans	20 January 2011
Best Sitcom: Porridge; I'm Alan Partridge; **Father Ted**; Best Stand-up: **Sam Kinison**; Lenny Bruce; Johnny Vegas; Best Comedy Actress: Penelope Keith; **Kathy Burke**; Catherine Tate; Best Comedy Entertainment Personality: Mark Lamarr; Les Dawson; **Barry Humphries**
