= Room 101 (British TV series) =

BBC TV comedy talk show

- Also known as: Room 101 – Extra Storage (extended repeats)
- Genre: Comedy panel game
- Directed by: John F. D. Northover (1994–97); Phil Chilvers (1999); Geraldine Dowd (2000–07); Paul Wheeler (2012); Ian Lorimer (2012–18)
- Presented by: Nick Hancock (1994–97); Paul Merton (1999–2007); Frank Skinner (2012–18)
- Country of origin: United Kingdom
- Original language: English
- No. of series: 18
- No. of episodes: 148 (list of episodes)

Production
- Executive producers: Jimmy Mulville (series 12–18); Richard Wilson (series 12–18); Mirella Breda (series 12–18)
- Producers: Lissa Evans (series 1–3); Toby Stevens (series 4–5); Victoria Payne (series 6–10); Paul McGettigan (series 11); Adam Copeland (series 12–18)
- Production locations: The London Studios (series 1–11); BBC Television Centre (series 12–13); Elstree Studios (series 14–16, 18); BBC Elstree Centre (series 17)
- Editors: Steve Dix (series 12); Tim Ellison (series 12–18); Dan Evans (series 13–18)
- Running time: 30 minutes
- Production company: Hat Trick Productions

Original release
- Network: BBC Two
- Release: 4 July 1994 – 9 February 2007
- Network: BBC One
- Release: 20 January 2012 – 6 April 2018

Related
- Room 101 (radio series); TV Heaven, Telly Hell; Room 101 (Australian TV series)

Room 101 is a BBC comedy television series based on the radio series of the same name, in which celebrities are invited to discuss their pet hates and persuade the host to consign those hates to oblivion in Room 101, a location whose name was inspired by the torture room in George Orwell's 1949 novel Nineteen Eighty-Four which reputedly contained "the worst thing in the world". Orwell himself named it after a meeting room in Broadcasting House where he would sit through tedious meetings. It was produced independently for the BBC by Hat Trick Productions.

Nick Hancock hosted the first three series of the show from 1994 until 1997. He was succeeded by Paul Merton, who hosted the show from 1999 till the show's original run came to an end in 2007. Frank Skinner hosted the revamped incarnation that started in 2012.

The 1994–2007 incarnation of the show was that of a one-on-one interview between the host and guest. Consignment of the nominated items, persons or concepts to Room 101 (theoretically banishing them from the world forever) was the decision of the host, sometimes after soliciting the opinion of the studio audience. The 2012 revamp introduced a panel format with three guests competing to have their pet hates consigned to Room 101, a decision made by the host. Guests included Ricky Gervais, Spike Milligan, Stephen Fry, Boris Johnson, Ben Miller and Ian Hislop (the only person to appear twice on the show in its original format). Fry went as far as to put Room 101 itself into Room 101.

A Dutch version of Room 101 started on 24 February 2008, but was short-lived. An Israeli version of the show was broadcast between 2010 and 2013. An Australian version of the show hosted by Paul McDermott began in 2015.

== History ==
The radio series was originally broadcast on BBC Radio 5 in 1992, where it was hosted by Nick Hancock. Hancock was also the first presenter when the series transferred to television two years later. The first ever guest on the TV version was comedian Bob Monkhouse who cast the French into Room 101.

In 1999, Hancock was replaced as host by Paul Merton (who was also the first ever guest on the original radio version). Merton's first guest was Nick Hancock and his last was his fellow regular team captain on Have I Got News for You, Ian Hislop. Usually, there were five nominations discussed in each show – represented by several surreal props. The last item usually goes in, sometimes for a forfeit.

Following Merton's departure in 2007, it was announced that a replacement would be sought; however, it was not until 2012 that a twelfth series, now fronted by Frank Skinner, was aired.

In July 2018, Skinner announced that, after 24 years, the show had been cancelled by the BBC.

The show returned as a radio series on BBC Radio 4 in summer 2023, in the original single-guest format and with Paul Merton returning as host.

== Transmissions ==
Series	Start date	End date	Episodes
1	4 July 1994	22 August 1994	8
2	1 September 1995	20 October 1995	8
3	1 August 1997	26 September 1997	8
4	22 July 1999	10 September 1999	8
5	4 August 2000	29 September 2000	8
6	8 January 2001	12 March 2001	10
7	25 February 2002	22 April 2002	8
8	3 November 2003	22 December 2003	8
9	13 September 2004	1 November 2004	8
10	14 September 2005	2 November 2005	8
11	5 January 2007	9 February 2007	6
12	20 January 2012	9 March 2012	8
13	4 January 2013	22 February 2013	8
14	24 January 2014	14 March 2014	8
15	2 January 2015	6 March 2015	9
16	14 January 2016	17 March 2016	9
17	13 January 2017	8 May 2017	9
18	12 January 2018	6 April 2018	9

== See also ==
- Room 101 (radio series)
