= Sean Lock =

English comedian and actor (1963–2021)

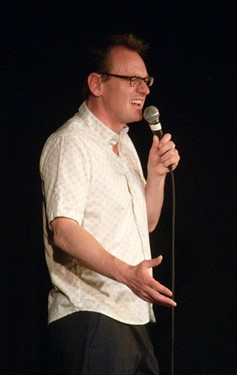
- Lock in 2008
- Born: 22 April 1963; Chertsey, Surrey, England
- Died: 16 August 2021 (aged 58) (Note: The Guardian and The Independent reported that Lock died on 16 August. Other journalistic sources reported that he died on 18 August, the day his death was announced.); London, England
- Education: Drama Centre London
- Spouse: Anoushka Nara Giltsoff
- Children: 3

Comedy career
- Years active: 1993–2021
- Medium: Television; stand-up; radio
- Genres: Dry humour; Deadpan; Surreal

Sean Lock (22 April 1963 – 16 August 2021) was an English comedian and actor. He began his comedy career as a stand-up comedian. In 2000, Lock won the British Comedy Award, in the category of Best Live Comic, and was nominated for the Perrier Comedy Award. He was a team captain on the Channel 4 comedy panel show 8 Out of 10 Cats from 2005 to 2015, and on 8 Out of 10 Cats Does Countdown from 2012 until his death in 2021.

Lock frequently appeared on stage, television and radio. His routines were often surreal and delivered in a deadpan style. He also wrote material for Bill Bailey, Lee Evans and Mark Lamarr. Lock was voted the 55th-greatest stand-up comic on Channel 4's 100 Greatest Stand-Ups in 2007, and he was upgraded to 19th in the updated 2010 list. He was a frequent guest on other panel shows, including BBC's Have I Got News for You, QI and They Think It's All Over.

== Early life ==
Lock was born in Chertsey, Surrey, on 22 April 1963, the youngest of four children. His father, Sidney, worked in the building industry; his mother, Mary (née McCreesh), was from Cullaville, County Armagh. Lock was raised in Woking, Surrey, where he attended St John the Baptist School.

During Lock's teenage years, he watched art-house films on BBC Two, and named Andrei Tarkovsky's 1979 science-fiction film Stalker as one that affected him greatly. In 1981, he left education with a grade E in A-level English. Afterwards, his father got him a job stripping concrete panels from buildings. After spending seven years as a labourer, he travelled, taking on different jobs. For six weeks, he worked on a French farm as a goat herder and worked on a kibbutz in Israel. During this period, he also worked as a toilet cleaner and a Department of Health and Social Security office worker. During his work as a labourer, he developed skin cancer.

He then decided to pursue acting and enrolled at the Drama Centre London, though he soon realised he had made an error. He quit and returned to being a labourer. After Lock saw comedians like Alexei Sayle and Paul Merton performing in comedy clubs, he decided to pursue comedy. Throughout this time, he visited comedy shows in London pubs and started doing open-mic spots as a hobby. In 1988, Lock had his first official gig at a pub in Stoke Newington, London. After being paid £15 for his 20 minutes, he realised he could pursue being a comedian as a career.

== Career ==
Lock's early television work included a supporting role alongside Rob Newman and David Baddiel in the 1993 series Newman and Baddiel in Pieces including touring with them as their support act. Frank Skinner and Eddie Izzard are credited as major influences on his comedy. A popular belief is that Lock was the first stand-up comedian to perform at Wembley Arena, as he was the support act for Newman and Baddiel. But, while Lock was the support act, he only featured in skits in the middle of the show.

=== 15 Minutes of Misery and 15 Storeys High ===
Lock made regular appearances on various radio panel shows and script-edited for Bill Bailey's 1998 BBC2 series, Is It Bill Bailey?. In December 1998, he launched his own show on BBC Radio 4, 15 Minutes of Misery, originally as a five-episode pilot. These shows also featured actors Kevin Eldon and Hattie Hayridge. The premise involved Lock eavesdropping on his neighbours in his south London tower block (all played by Lock, Eldon and Hayridge) using a bugging device fitted by his plumber, "Hot Bob" (Eldon), which was known as "The Bugger King" (and had "nothing to do with meat or sex"). 15 Minutes of Misery lasted for one series of six programmes in late 1998 and early 1999.

In 1999, 15 Minutes of Misery was expanded into the half-hour series 15 Storeys High, co-written by Lock and Martin Trenaman. From ostensibly the same tower block, Lock's character was now given a flatmate (the hapless Errol) and a job at the local swimming baths, as well as a somewhat dour and intolerant demeanour. The bugging device was no longer used, but the antics of Lock's neighbours still featured heavily in the show. The plots for this series were more linear in a "traditional" sitcom style, although they still showed Lock's brand of dark, surreal humour. 15 Storeys High transferred to television after two radio series, with Lock's character renamed 'Vince', for a further two series in 2002 and 2004. Initially aired on BBC Choice, it follows a cynical Vince and his naive flatmate Errol (Benedict Wong). It attracted a cult following after its release as a VHS box set and on DVD.

=== Other work ===
In 1995, Lock played an escaped murderer in an episode of The World of Lee Evans, alongside Lee Evans and Phil Daniels. Lock wrote the screenplay for Andrew Kötting's 2001 feature film This Filthy Earth, based on the novel La Terre by Émile Zola. In 2004, Lock had a guest appearance on television's first-ever "dope opera", Top Buzzer, written by Johnny Vaughan.

In 2005, he became a regular team captain on the Channel 4 panel game 8 Out of 10 Cats. In an article at the time of his death, The Guardian said Lock "will be best remembered as a team captain for the first 18 series of... 8 Out of 10 Cats... and he quickly emerged as its biggest star". He was a team captain on 8 Out of 10 Cats between 2005 and 2015, and on its spin-off 8 Out of 10 Cats Does Countdown between 2012 and 2021.

In spring 2006, he hosted his own entertainment show on Channel 4 called TV Heaven, Telly Hell. Lock narrated the BBC production World Cup Goals Galore in 2006. In 2008, he appeared on The Big Fat Quiz of the Year, on a team with James Corden. Lock also appeared on many popular British TV panel shows, including Have I Got News for You, QI and They Think It's All Over. He was also a celebrity guest in The Last Leg. Lock became "The Curator" for the second radio series of The Museum of Curiosity, in 2009, taking over from Bill Bailey.

In 2010, Lock took part in Channel 4's Comedy Gala, a benefit show held in aid of Great Ormond Street Children's Hospital, filmed live at The O2 Arena. He also appeared in a spoof video produced by Shelter, the housing charity, to highlight the problem of rogue landlords. In 2011, he took over from John Sergeant as the host of the Dave comedy panel show Argumental. In 2019, Lock featured in episode 4 of the BBC comedy series Mandy.

== Comedic style ==
Lock was known for his surreal style, deadpan delivery and dry humour. The Guardian stated that he was "celebrated for his carefully crafted surreal content and imaginative observational wit". Lock stated that comedy is not always easy, saying: "The real secret [...] is every day spending tedious hours straining over a blank sheet of paper trying to think of something funny. Some days I'd rather try and lay an egg".

Ed Power of The Daily Telegraph described his persona as "studiedly obtuse". He said Lock's topics included political correctness, "existential woe", and the difficulties of being a football supporter which gave him "irresistible everyman quality". Power described him as "a Samuel Beckett trapped inside a Tommy Cooper punchline". Power also suggested that his persona was so convincing because it matched his off-stage persona. Fellow comedian Harry Hill said, "People are tempted to pigeonhole him as dark or surreal but he was more than that. He had a playful side; a wide-eyed wonder at the world".

During an interview with Bill Bailey on the Channel 4 show Comic's Choice, Lock listed Sam Kinison and Lenny Bruce as his main comedy influences. On the BBC Radio 2 show Talking Comedy, he listed Paul Merton, Steven Wright, Jasper Carrott, Les Dawson, Jerry Sadowitz, Kenneth Williams and Hylda Baker as his favourite comedians.

== Personal life ==
Lock and his wife, Anoushka Nara Giltsoff, had two daughters, born in 2004 and 2006, and a son born in 2009. The family lived in the Muswell Hill area of London.

Lock was diagnosed with melanoma in 1990, attributing the condition to overexposure to the sun while working as a builder in the early 1980s. The lesion on his back was discovered by a one-night stand. After seeing his doctor, he was referred to a dermatologist at Guy's Hospital, London, and made a full recovery. In May 2012, he gave his support to a Sun Awareness event at the hospital.

Lock was a supporter of Chelsea and was an active supporter of the Muswell Hill soup kitchen. In December 2020, Lock made a video to help raise funds for Edible London, a charity that aimed to provide ingredients for a million meals to help those struggling in lockdown. In the clip, he quipped, "I'm Sean Lock. You may know me as that bloke off the telly whose name you can't remember."

== Death and tributes ==
Lock died of cancer at his home, on 16 August 2021, aged 58. According to Bill Bailey, a close friend of Lock, he had been diagnosed with advanced lung cancer a few years earlier. Those who paid tribute included fellow 8 Out of 10 Cats performers Jimmy Carr and Jon Richardson; Countdown's Rachel Riley and Susie Dent; many comedians; Chelsea F.C.; QI; and Channel 4. Harry Hill wrote a piece in The Guardian, describing him as "the comedian's comedian".

On 19 August 2021, Channel 4 aired a tribute to Lock, showing his stand-up show Keep It Light along with an episode of 8 Out of 10 Cats Does Countdown. Chelsea Football Club paid tribute to Lock on 11 September during their fixture against Aston Villa with a one-minute applause during the 58th (the age at which he died) minute of the match. In addition, the tribute night of programming prompted fans and friends, including Kathy Burke, to call for the BBC to add 15 Storeys High to its online service. Following this, the BBC released both series of the show onto its iPlayer service on 27 August 2021.

Fans of Lock called for his book The Tiger Who Came for a Pint to be published, with some fans suggesting the proceeds should go to cancer research in his honour. The book is a parody on the children's book The Tiger Who Came to Tea, and was read on 8 Out of 10 Cats Does Countdown. In August 2022, Bill Bailey, joined by family and friends of Lock, completed a 100-mile (160-kilometre) charity walk in memory of Lock, raising more than £110,000 for Macmillan Cancer Support. In 2023, Channel 4 announced the creation of the Sean Lock Comedy Award, an award intended to showcase "talented new writers and performers who embody the alternative comedic spirit of Sean and Channel 4."

== Stand-up shows ==
Year	Title	Notes
2010	Lockipedia	
2013	Purple Van Man	
2016–18	Keep It Light	

=== DVD releases ===
Title	Released	Notes	Ref.
Live	17 November 2008	Live at London's HMV Hammersmith Apollo	
Lockipedia Live	22 November 2010	Live at London's HMV Hammersmith Apollo	
Purple Van Man (Live 2013)	18 November 2013	Live at London's HMV Hammersmith Apollo	
Keep It Light – Live	20 November 2017	Live at Margate's Theatre Royal	

== Filmography ==
=== Television ===
Year	Title	Role	Notes	Ref.
1991	Acumen	—N/a	Artist	
1993	Smart Alek	Smart Alek	Writer, television short	
1993	Newman and Baddiel in Pieces	Shenley Grange		
1995	The World of Lee Evans	Mitchell		
1995	Anton & Minty	Visitor	Also writer, television short	
1996	The Chef and the Dancer	Guest appearance		
1997	The Jack Docherty Show	Guest appearance		
1998	Not The Jack Docherty Show	Guest appearance		
1999	Is It Bill Bailey?	—N/a	Script editor	
2000	TV to Go	Guest appearance		
2000	Stand up Perrier	Guest appearance		
2001	We Know Where You Live	Guest appearance		
2001	This Filthy Earth	—N/a	Writer	
2002	Jesus Christ Airlines	Guest appearance		
2002	Is This It?	Guest appearance		
2002–2004	15 Storeys High	Vince Clark	Also writer and associate producer	
2003–2011	QI	Guest panellist	32 episodes	
2004	Today with Des and Mel	Guest appearance		
2004	The Terry and Gaby Show	Guest appearance		
2004	The Wright Stuff	Guest panellist		
2005–2015	8 Out of 10 Cats	Himself, team captain		
2006–2007	TV Heaven, Telly Hell	Himself, presenter		
2010	Ideal	Natalie/Nathaniel		
2012	The Real Man's Road Trip: Sean & Jon Go West	Himself		
2012–2013	The Channel 4 Mash Up	Himself		
2012–2022	8 Out of 10 Cats Does Countdown	Himself, team captain	Posthumous appearance in series 22 finale	
2014	Sean Lock: Purple Van Man	Himself		
2017	Dying Laughing	Himself, interviewee		
2020	Mandy	Geoff	Episode: "Fish" (Series 1 Episode 4)	

=== Radio ===
Year	Title	Role	Notes	Ref.
1998–1999	15 Minutes of Misery	Sean	Also writer	
1999–2000	15 Storeys High	Sean	Also writer. Two series. Transferred to BBC television.	
2004–2020	The Unbelievable Truth	Panel member	Four occasions: 2008, 2009, and twice in 2020.	

== Awards and nominations ==
Lock was voted the 55th-greatest stand-up comic on Channel 4's 100 Greatest Stand-Ups in 2007 and as the 19th-greatest stand-up comic in the updated 2010 list.

Year	Award	Category	Result	Ref.
2000	British Comedy Awards	Best Live Comic	Won	
2000	Perrier Comedy Award	—N/a	Nominated	
