= Phil Tufnell =

English cricketer (born 1966)

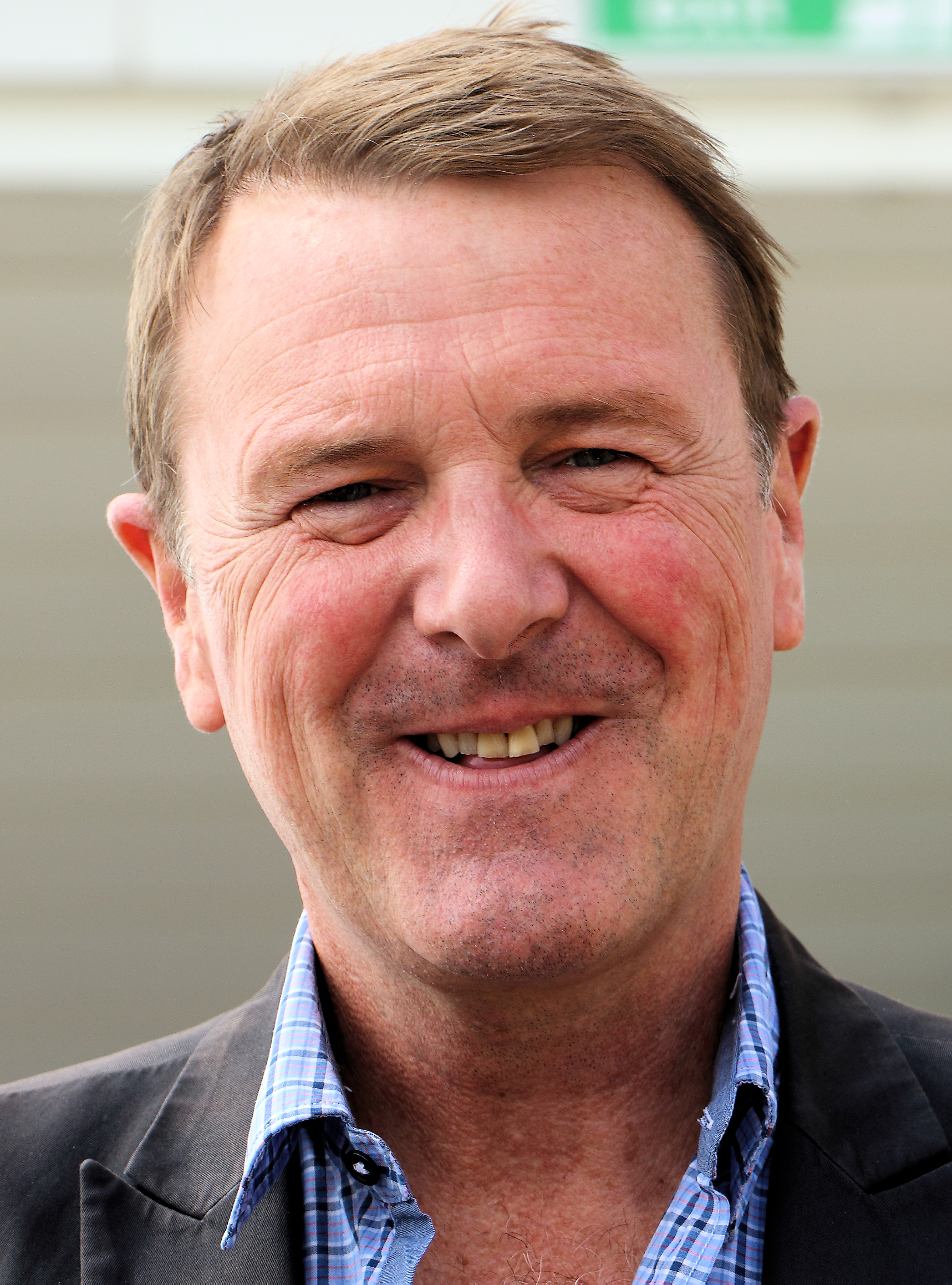
- Tufnell in 2015

Personal information
- Full name: Philip Clive Roderick Tufnell
- Born: 29 April 1966 (age 60); Barnet, London, England
- Nickname: Tuffers, the Cat, Two Sugars
- Batting: Right-handed
- Bowling: Slow left-arm orthodox
- Role: Bowler

International information
- National side: England (1990—2001)
- Test debut (cap 547): 26 December 1990 v Australia
- Last Test: 23 August 2001 v Australia
- ODI debut (cap 111): 7 December 1990 v New Zealand
- Last ODI: 20 February 1997 v New Zealand

Domestic team information
- Years: Team
- 1986–2002: Middlesex

Career statistics
Competition	Test	ODI	FC	LA
Matches	42	20	316	93
Runs scored	153	15	2,066	125
Batting average	5.10	15.00	9.69	8.92
100s/50s	0/0	0/0	0/1	0/0
Top score	22*	5*	67*	18
Balls bowled	11,288	1,020	76,934	4,663
Wickets	121	19	1,057	103
Bowling average	37.68	36.78	29.35	32.30
5 wickets in innings	5	0	53	1
10 wickets in match	2	0	6	0
Best bowling	7/47	4/22	8/29	5/28
Catches/stumpings	12/–	4/–	106/–	17/–
Medal record
Men's Cricket
Representing England
ICC Cricket World Cup
Runner-up	1992 Australia and New Zealand
- Source: CricInfo, 3 January 2008

Philip Clive Roderick Tufnell (born 29 April 1966) is an English former international cricketer and current television and radio personality.

A slow left-arm orthodox spin bowler, he played in 42 Test matches and 20 One Day Internationals for the England cricket team, as well as playing for Middlesex County Cricket Club from 1986 to 2002. Tufnell took 121 Test match wickets at an average of 37.68. Across all first-class cricket he took over 1,000 wickets at an average of 29.35. Tufnell's cheerful personality has made him a sports personality. He was a part of the English squad which finished as runners-up at the 1992 Cricket World Cup.

Following his retirement from playing cricket in 2002, Tufnell has built on his popularity with several television appearances, including They Think It's All Over, A Question of Sport, Strictly Come Dancing and winning I'm a Celebrity...Get Me Out of Here! in 2003.

== Early life ==
Tufnell was educated at Highgate School, where his cricketing prowess was recognised and he was appointed captain of the junior school's first XI before reaching the top year. On leaving Highgate, he attended and played cricket for Southgate School.

== Cricket career ==
A graph showing Tufnell's Test career bowling statistics and how they varied over time

As a slow left-arm orthodox spin bowler, Tufnell played 42 Test matches and 20 One Day Internationals for England between 1990 and 2001, as well as 316 first-class matches, mainly for Middlesex. Tufnell occasionally produced excellent performances, for example taking 11–93 against Australia at the Oval in 1997 (for which he won the Man of the Match award after England won by 19 runs) and seven wickets in the match (6–25 in the first innings) against the West Indies at the Oval in 1991. He took his 121 Test wickets with a bowling average of 37.68 across his whole Test career. Mark Waugh theorised that "if you attack him, he can go on the defensive, and it puts him off his game", although Waugh was Tufnell's most frequent Test victim, being dismissed a total of seven times by him, three of them bowled.

During his career spanning 16 years with Middlesex, Tufnell took 1,057 first-class wickets at an average of 29.35.

According to Michael Parkinson, a chat show host and cricketer, "at the age of nine he was opening the bowling and the batting for his club's junior team". Parkinson also believes that his "ordinary fielding made him a luxury in the view of the ... [English cricket] management [circa August 1996]". He was not at all an accomplished or confident batsman, often appearing particularly nervous and awkward at Test level, where he became regarded as the ultimate 'rabbit' number 11. Tufnell's fielding improved during his career. He was nicknamed "The Cat" due to his propensity to be found sleeping in the corner of the dressing room. He also acquired the nickname "Two Sugars" due to his well-known love of tea. According to England teammate Mike Atherton, Tufnell smoked quite heavily.

Tufnell received an honorary doctorate from Middlesex University on 20 July 2011 in recognition of his achievements in sport and the media.

== Broadcasting career ==
=== Radio ===
Since 2003, Tufnell has appeared as a summariser on BBC Radio's Test Match Special. He has also hosted The Phil Tufnell Cricket Show and Tuffers and Vaughan Cricket Show on BBC Radio 5.

=== Television ===
Tufnell retired from professional cricket before the 2003 season in order to participate in the second series of the reality television show I'm a Celebrity... Get Me Out of Here! which he won. Prior to this, he had appeared on Lily Savage's Blankety Blank. He was a team captain on sports quiz show They Think It's All Over until 2005. In 2004, he made two guest appearances on British soap opera Family Affairs and co-presented the ITV game show Simply the Best with Kirsty Gallacher.

Tufnell was a team captain on the BBC One panel show A Question of Sport. He also made regular appearances as a reporter on the BBC One magazine show The One Show.

On 12 April 2008, Tufnell and his wife Dawn appeared on the ITV game show All Star Mr & Mrs. On 4 October and 1 November 2008, Tufnell appeared on the game show Hole in the Wall. In 2009, he competed in the seventh series of the BBC's Strictly Come Dancing, partnering professional dancer Katya Virshilas. The couple were eliminated in the ninth week. On 7 October 2011, he appeared on the BBC One panel show Would I Lie To You?. On 19 November 2011, he appeared on a celebrity edition of ITV quiz show The Chase.

In 2012, he co-presented The Flowerpot Gang with Anneka Rice and Joe Swift. During the week of 12 to 16 May 2014, Tufnell appeared on the daytime Channel 4 game show Draw It!

On 1 February 2015, he competed in Get Your Act Together on ITV and The Jump on Channel 4. In December 2018, he joined Australia's Seven Network as a guest commentator for their coverage of the BBL and Sri Lankan Test matches.

In 2023, Tufnell appeared in the all star series I'm a Celebrity... South Africa.

== Personal life ==
Tufnell has been married to his third wife Dawn Brown since 2005. He has two daughters, one with former girlfriend Jane McElvoy and one with his second wife Lisa Bar. In 1994 he was fined £800 after admitting assaulting McElvoy, after she ended their relationship.

In 1997, while on a tour of New Zealand, allegations were made that he left a toilet cubicle of a restaurant trailing the scent of cannabis but he was exonerated after it emerged the incident was a publicity stunt.

Tufnell was the president of a cricket charity – The Change Foundation (formerly Cricket for Change) up to 2022. He is an ambassador of UK children's charity The Children's Trust for children with brain injury and neurodisability.

Tufnell is a fan of Arsenal Football Club.

== Bibliography ==
His autobiography What Now? ISBN 0-00-218816-3 was published in 1999. Tufnell also co-authored a humorous book, Phil Tufnell's A to Z of Cricket with cricket journalist Adam Hathaway.

Preceded by Tony Blackburn	I'm A Celebrity, Get Me Out of Here! Winner & King of The Jungle; 2003	Succeeded by Kerry Katona
