= List of Have I Got News for You episodes =

Episodes of news-based TV satirical panel show

Have I Got News for You (HIGNFY) is a British television panel show produced by Hat Trick Productions for the BBC. Episodes were originally aired on BBC Two between 28 September 1990 and 2 June 2000, before being aired on BBC One since 20 October 2000. As of 20 November 2026, 668 episodes of Have I Got News for You have aired, currently in its seventy-second series. Two exclusive-to-video editions, three Comic Relief crossovers with fellow BBC panel shows and a 60-minute live webcast version, also for Comic Relief, have aired. The list also includes the compilation episodes produced for the programme – those made between 1995 and 2001, and from 2010 onwards.

All episodes include details on the guest panellists who featured on each team – captained by Ian Hislop and Paul Merton (unless otherwise noted) – the scores achieved, and, since the third episode of Series 24 after the dismissal of its former host Angus Deayton, the guest host that presented the programme.

== Episode list ==
The following lists the episodes of HIGNFY per series, including guest panellists for each team, scores, and, since the third episode of the 24th series, the host for that corresponding episode. The coloured backgrounds denote the result of each of the shows:

– indicates Ian's team won
– indicates Paul's team won
– indicates the game ended in a draw

=== Series 1 (1990) ===
Episode	Air date	Ian's team	Paul's team	Scores
01x01	28 September 1990	Sandi Toksvig	Kate Saunders	25–21
01x02	5 October 1990	Jan Ravens	Martin Young	23–25
01x03	12 October 1990	Tony Slattery	Robert Harris	23–25
01x04	19 October 1990	Arthur Smith	Gill Pyrah	24–26
01x05	26 October 1990	Dillie Keane	Simon Hoggart	22–20
01x06	2 November 1990	Rory McGrath	Ken Livingstone MP	22–24
01x07	9 November 1990	Clive Anderson	Russell Davies	19–21
01x08	16 November 1990	Germaine Greer	Tony Banks MP	18–21

=== Series 2 (1991) ===
Episode	Air date	Ian's team	Paul's team	Scores
02x01	4 October 1991	Sandi Toksvig	David Thomas	(Note: The scores were not stated at the end of this episode)
02x02	11 October 1991	Tony Slattery	Alan Coren	21–25
02x03	18 October 1991	Rory McGrath	Tony Banks MP	25–18
02x04	25 October 1991	John Wells	Robert Harris	16–18
02x05	1 November 1991	Nick Hancock	Clare Short MP	20–18
02x06	8 November 1991	Stephen Frost	Michael White	12–22
02x07	15 November 1991	Craig Ferguson	Trevor McDonald	11–14
02x08	22 November 1991	Richard Ingrams	Richard Littlejohn	13–19
02x09	29 November 1991	Jan Ravens	Martin Young	14–15
02x10	6 December 1991	Kevin Day	Edwina Currie MP	23–17
02x11	24 December 1991 (Note: Christmas special)	Harry Enfield	Clive Anderson	26–31

=== 1992 General Election Special (1992) ===
Episode	Air date	Ian's team	Paul's team	Scores
Sp.	9 April 1992 (Note: Election special)	Rory Bremner	Alan Coren	20–22

=== Series 3 (1992) ===
Episode	Air date	Ian's team	Paul's team	Scores
03x01	24 April 1992	John Wells	Tony Slattery	15–23
03x02	1 May 1992	Donna McPhail	Joan Bakewell	20–18
03x03	8 May 1992	Jan Ravens	Charles Kennedy MP	21–19
03x04	15 May 1992	Harry Enfield	John Diamond	16–23
03x05	22 May 1992	Rory McGrath	Ken Livingstone MP	11–17
03x06	29 May 1992	Danny Baker	Steve Steen	16–21
03x07	5 June 1992	Anne Robinson	Griff Rhys Jones	17–19
03x08	12 June 1992	Stephen Frost	Stephanie Calman	14–18
03x09	19 June 1992	John Sessions	Trevor McDonald	18–23
03x10	26 June 1992	Norman Willis	Cecil Parkinson	12–17

=== Series 4 (1992) ===
Episode	Air date	Ian's team	Paul's team	Scores
04x01	16 October 1992	John Sessions	Griff Rhys Jones	17–16
04x02	23 October 1992 (Note: The game finished as a tie at 16–16, so the caption competition was used as a tie-breaker, where Paul earned the biggest laugh. This is the only time points have ever been awarded for this section.)	David Baddiel	Charles Kennedy MP	16–17
04x03	30 October 1992	Danny Baker	Annabel Giles	13–11
04x04	6 November 1992	Frank Skinner	Jerry Hayes MP	13–18
04x05	13 November 1992	Rory Bremner	Ken Livingstone MP	17–13
04x06	20 November 1992	Sandi Toksvig	Nick Hancock	18–16
04x07	27 November 1992	Chris Tarrant	Meera Syal	16–18
04x08	4 December 1992	Jo Brand	Neil Kinnock MP	18–15
04x09	11 December 1992	Peter Cook	Douglas Adams	11–17
04x10	18 December 1992	Stephen Fry	Frank Skinner	12–18

==== Have I Got A Question of Sport for You (1993) ====
Episode	Air date	Ian's team	Paul's team	Scores
Sp.	12 March 1993 (Note: Special programme for Comic Relief, combining elements of Have I Got News for You with another popular panel show, A Question of Sport.)	Frank Bruno	Bill Beaumont	9–11

=== Series 5 (1993) ===
Episode	Air date	Ian's team	Paul's team	Scores
05x01	16 April 1993	Jonathan Ross	Peter Cook	11–13
05x02	23 April 1993	Chris Evans	Fiona Armstrong	15–17
05x03	30 April 1993	Frank Skinner	Richard Littlejohn	17–15
05x04	7 May 1993	Caroline Quentin	Baz Bamigboye	16–17
05x05	14 May 1993	Meera Syal	Amanda Platell	17–21
05x06	21 May 1993	Mark Thomas	David Steel MP	18–20
05x07	28 May 1993	Alan Coren	John Simpson	18–11
05x08	4 June 1993	Tony Slattery	"The Rt. Hon. Tub of Lard MP" (Note: The tub of lard was a stand-in for Roy Hattersley, who had pulled out of a recording at the last minute for the third time. Angus explained that Hattersley and the lard were "imbued with many of the same qualities". This marks the first occasion that the panel consisted of fewer than five people.)	16–20

=== Series 6 (1993) ===
Episode	Air date	Ian's team	Paul's team	Scores
06x01	29 October 1993 (Note: "Margaret Thatcher special", focusing on her period as Prime Minister and broadcast as part of a night of programming themed around her. Agreed by both Ian and Paul to be the show's 'worst' episode, due to the two guests doing nothing but "spit poison at each other".)	Derek Hatton	Edwina Currie MP	18–12
06x02	5 November 1993	Tony Hawks	Roy Hattersley MP	13–21
06x03	12 November 1993	Alexei Sayle	Gerald Kaufman MP	13–17
06x04	19 November 1993	Jo Brand	Frank Bough	16–20
06x05	26 November 1993	Jimmy Tarbuck	Vitali Vitaliev	20–14
06x06	3 December 1993	Kathy Burke	Martin Young	17–19
06x07	10 December 1993	Maria McErlane	Jon Snow	13–21
06x08	17 December 1993	Maureen Lipman	Lesley Abdela	17–19
06x09	24 December 1993 (Note: In a typical example of the occasional 'end of season japes', Ian and Paul swapped seats – and dress senses – for this episode.)	Griff Rhys Jones	Bob Geldof	10–23

=== Series 7 (1994) ===
Episode	Air date	Ian's team	Paul's team	Scores
07x01	22 April 1994	Jonathan Ross	Eddie Izzard	15–21
07x02	29 April 1994	Kathy Lette	Caroline Quentin	21–14
07x03	6 May 1994	Bob Monkhouse	Francis Wheen	13–24
07x04	13 May 1994	Jack Dee	Tony Hawks	17–16
07x05	20 May 1994	Hugh Dennis	John Stalker	19–17
07x06	27 May 1994	Maureen Lipman	Sir Rhodes Boyson MP	15–16
07x07	3 June 1994 (Note: It was during this episode that Ian was suffering from appendicitis.)	Mariella Frostrup	Neil Kinnock MP	16–18
07x08	10 June 1994	Donna McPhail	Salman Rushdie	9–14

=== Series 8 (1994) ===
Episode	Air date	Ian's team	Paul's team	Scores
08x01	28 October 1994	Martin Clunes	James Pickles	14–15
08x02	4 November 1994	Arthur Smith	Richard Coles	13–14
08x03	11 November 1994	Lee Hurst	Andrew Morton	12–11
08x04	18 November 1994	Nick Hancock	David Icke	19–12
08x05	25 November 1994	Helen Atkinson-Wood	Sir Teddy Taylor MP	17–25
08x06	2 December 1994	Hattie Hayridge	Glenda Jackson MP	13–14
08x07	9 December 1994	Jack Docherty	Moray Hunter	13–15
08x08	16 December 1994	Hugh Dennis	Michael Buerk	12–13
08x09	23 December 1994	Alexei Sayle	Kelvin MacKenzie	13–11

=== Series 9 (1995) ===
Episode	Air date	Ian's team	Paul's team	Scores
09x01	21 April 1995	Diane Abbott MP	Julian Clary	14–17
09x02	28 April 1995	Eddie Izzard	Michael Winner	10–14
09x03	5 May 1995	John Fortune	John Bird	15–16
09x04	12 May 1995	Steve Wright	Alan Cumming	8–18
09x05	19 May 1995	Fred MacAulay	Germaine Greer	14–12
09x06	26 May 1995	Frank Skinner	Raoul Heertje	17–10
09x07	2 June 1995	Tim Rice	Terry Major-Ball	13–14
09x08	9 June 1995	Spike Milligan	Andrew Neil	11–13

==== Have I Got Unbroadcastable News for You (1995) ====
Episode	Release date	Ian's team	Paul's team	Scores
Video	30 October 1995 (Note: Included a special guest appearance by Germaine Greer in the Odd One Out round, and extra features including a video diary from The Rt. Hon. Tub of Lard MP.)	Richard Wilson	Eddie Izzard	29–26

=== Series 10 (1995) ===
Episode	Air date	Ian's team	Paul's team	Scores
10x01	27 October 1995	Gordon Kennedy	Paula Yates	12–13
10x02	3 November 1995	Bob Mills	Alex Salmond MP	12–11
10x03	10 November 1995	Melvyn Bragg	Mike Yarwood	13–8
10x04	17 November 1995	Alan Coren	Terry Christian	11–7
10x05	24 November 1995	Neil Morrissey	Teresa Gorman MP	8–13
10x06	1 December 1995	Alan Davies	Ken Livingstone MP	11–14
10x07	8 December 1995	Craig Charles	P. J. O'Rourke	13–5
10x08	15 December 1995	Lee Hurst	Mark Little (and Colin the Parrot (Note: Colin was a sulphur-crested cockatoo that had supposedly been trained to squawk out various heckles at Angus, but his only contribution was a brief "Hello" towards the end. Paul Merton later said that gimmicks like this contributed to his decision to take the following series off.))	10–11
10x09	23 December 1995	1995 highlights		

=== Series 11 (1996) ===
Episode	Air date	Ian's team	Guest team	Scores
11x01	19 April 1996	Paul Merton	Eddie Izzard and Charles Kennedy MP	13–7
11x02	26 April 1996	Dermot Morgan	Eddie Izzard and Janet Street-Porter	8–10
11x03	3 May 1996	Alan Davies	Clive Anderson and Mohammad al-Massari	13–15
11x04	10 May 1996	Claire Rayner	Martin Clunes and Neil Morrissey	8–7
11x05	17 May 1996	Fred MacAulay	Eddie Izzard and Max Clifford	15–11
11x06	24 May 1996	Felix Dexter	Clive Anderson and Piers Morgan	11–10
11x07	31 May 1996	Rich Hall	Alan Davies and Rupert Allason MP	5–13
11x08	7 June 1996	Richard Wilson	John Bird and John Fortune	17–10

=== Series 12 (1996) ===
Episode	Air date	Ian's team	Paul's team	Scores
12x01	4 October 1996	Greg Proops	Ken Livingstone MP	13–18
12x02	11 October 1996	Rhona Cameron	Peter Stringfellow	8–11
12x03	18 October 1996	Mark Little	Nigel Lawson	9–10
12x04	25 October 1996	Maureen Lipman	Tony Parsons	9–11
12x05	1 November 1996	Gordon Kennedy	Elvis Costello	14–17
12x06	8 November 1996	Tony Hawks	Vincent Hanna	15–13
12x07	15 November 1996	Mark Hurst	Francis Wheen	6–19
12x08	22 November 1996	Jack Docherty	Austin Mitchell MP	15–8
12x09	29 November 1996	Alan Davies	Jennifer Paterson	15–10
12x10	20 December 1996	1996 highlights		

=== Series 13 (1997) ===
Episode	Air date	Ian's team	Paul's team	Scores
13x01	18 April 1997	Fred MacAulay	Swampy	16–11
13x02	25 April 1997	Hugh Dennis	Will Self	12–11
13x03	1 May 1997	Richard Wilson	Nick Ross	13–12
13x04	9 May 1997	Maureen Lipman	Neil and Christine Hamilton (Note: Originally, only Christine had been due to appear, but she requested an extra seat be reserved for husband Neil (only a week after Martin Bell had famously ousted him from Parliament in that year's general election). This marked the first occasion where the panel has consisted of more than five people.)	14–13
13x05	16 May 1997	Jack Docherty	Greg Dyke	12–10
13x06	23 May 1997	Sue Perkins	Eve Pollard	9–15
13x07	30 May 1997	Martin Clunes	Michael Parkinson	10–11
13x08	6 June 1997	Dominic Holland	Germaine Greer	8–13

=== Series 14 (1997) ===
Episode	Air date	Ian's team	Paul's team	Scores
14x01	24 October 1997	Bob Monkhouse	Ken Livingstone MP	9–13
14x02	31 October 1997	Max Boyce	Alex Salmond MP	15–16
14x03	7 November 1997	Dermot Morgan	Francis Wheen	7–12
14x04	14 November 1997	Graeme Garden	Kirsty Young	12–11
14x05	21 November 1997	Arabella Weir	Tony Livesey	6–13
14x06	28 November 1997	Hattie Hayridge	Warren Mitchell	11–13
14x07	5 December 1997	Jeff Green	Brian Sewell	16–9
14x08	12 December 1997	Alan Davies	Matthew Parris	20–21
14x09	19 December 1997	1997 highlights		

==== The Official Pirate Video (1997) ====
Episode	Release date	Ian's team	Paul's team	Scores
Video	3 November 1997 (Note: The end of this episode featured a walk-on guest appearance by Mr. Bramley, where he was "awarded" to the losers.)	Martin Clunes	Neil Morrissey	12–21

=== Series 15 (1998) ===
Episode	Air date	Ian's team	Paul's team	Scores
15x01	17 April 1998	Patrick Kielty	Stephen Bayley	6–12
15x02	24 April 1998	Janet Street-Porter	Boris Johnson	13–12
15x03	1 May 1998	Will Self	John Humphrys	10–17
15x04	8 May 1998	Phil Hammond	Patrick Moore	8–13
15x05	15 May 1998	Jonathan King	John Sergeant	11–10
15x06	22 May 1998	Germaine Greer	Chris Donald	11–15
15x07	29 May 1998	Antony Worrall Thompson	Oona King MP	10–16
15x08	5 June 1998	Danny Baker	Richard Wilson	10–14

=== Series 16 (1998) ===
Episode	Air date	Ian's team	Paul's team	Scores	Viewing figures
16x01	23 October 1998	John Simpson	Magnus Magnusson	8–13	6.54m
16x02	30 October 1998	Ian McCaskill	Michael Mansfield	7–13	5.97m
16x03	6 November 1998	Jackie Mason	Michael Crick	13–10	6.9m
16x04	13 November 1998	Alan Titchmarsh	Stephen Bayley	10–14	6.73m
16x05	20 November 1998	Loyd Grossman	Bob Marshall-Andrews MP	8–9	6.57m
16x06	27 November 1998	Linda Smith	Gavin Esler	12–15	6.49m
16x07	4 December 1998	Charles Kennedy MP	George Melly	10–11	6.46m
16x08	11 December 1998	Tom Baker	Muriel Gray	10–6	6.24m
16x09	18 December 1998	1998 highlights			5.27m

==== Have I Got Buzzcocks All Over (1999) ====
Episode	Air date	Phill Jupitus' team	Nick Hancock's team	Scores
Sp.	12 March 1999 (Note: Special programme for Comic Relief, combining elements of Have I Got News for You with the other then-leading comedy panel shows on the BBC; Never Mind the Buzzcocks, and They Think It's All Over. Although the latter two were made by a different production company to HIGNFY, there was one crucial link between all three besides basic format; producer Harry Thompson.)	Meat Loaf and Jo Brand	Carol Barnes and Phil Tufnell	4–5

=== Series 17 (1999) ===
Episode	Air date	Ian's team	Paul's team	Scores	Viewing figures
17x01	16 April 1999	Richard Whiteley	David Aaronovitch	17–8	8.52m
17x02	23 April 1999	Paul Daniels	Charlie Whelan	12–14	8.35m
17x03	30 April 1999	Trevor Phillips	Bill Bailey	16–11	6.87m
17x04	7 May 1999	Peter Hitchens	Clarissa Dickson Wright	14–16	6.74m
17x05	14 May 1999	Stephen Fry	Richard Littlejohn	13–12	7.3m
17x06	21 May 1999	Meera Syal	Brian Sewell	11–13	7.41m
17x07	28 May 1999	Jimmy Savile	Diane Abbott MP	10–14	6.28m
17x08	4 June 1999	Pauline McLynn	Edward Stourton	13–12	7.85m

=== Series 18 (1999) ===
Episode	Air date	Ian's team	Paul's team	Scores	Viewing figures
18x01	22 October 1999	Martin Clunes	Lembit Öpik MP	11–14	6.17m
18x02	29 October 1999	Gordon Ramsay	Francis Wheen	7–13	7.02m
18x03	5 November 1999	Glenda Jackson MP	The Earl of Onslow	12–15	6.43m
18x04	12 November 1999	John Sergeant	Mark Seddon	9–15	5.89m
18x05	19 November 1999	Gyles Brandreth	Michael Cole	13–9	7.56m
18x06	26 November 1999	Anna Ford	Alex Salmond MP	17–10	6.16m
18x07	3 December 1999	Boris Johnson	Janet Street-Porter	9–14	7.11m
18x08	10 December 1999	Bill Deedes	Will Self	13–14	6.44m
18x09	17 December 1999	1999 highlights			6.49m

=== Series 19 (2000) ===
Episode	Air date	Ian's team	Paul's team	Scores	Viewing figures
19x01	14 April 2000	Stephen Fry	David Shayler (Note: Due to the legal circumstances surrounding him at the time, Shayler's contribution was recorded via satellite linkup from a studio in Paris, which was fed into a monitor on set. Merton was visibly unimpressed with the arrangement, as it left his guest two seconds behind everyone else, affecting the timing of the comedy.)	14–9	7.5m
19x02	21 April 2000	Dominic Holland	David Steel	14–10	6.95m
19x03	28 April 2000	Michael Brown	Max Clifford	11–9	7.09m
19x04	5 May 2000	Angela Rippon	Peter Kilfoyle MP	12–13	7.52m
19x05	12 May 2000	Sheila Hancock	Robert Reed (Note: Robert Reed was a member of Conservative Future who, in the footsteps of William Hague (by this point the party's leader), had made a speech at the previous year's Conservative Party Conference at the age of 16. Conservative Conference – Bad day, good day guardian.co.uk, 6 October 1999)	12–14	7.02m
19x06	19 May 2000	Clive Anderson	Liza Tarbuck	11–12	8.34m
19x07	26 May 2000	Jon Snow	Dr. Phil Hammond	11–16	7.28m
19x08	2 June 2000 (Note: Last episode to air on BBC Two (except for two episodes in 2017 and 2026).)	Richard Wilson	Michael Brunson	16–10	8.07m

=== Series 20 (2000) ===
Episode	Air date	Ian's team	Paul's team	Scores	Viewing figures
20x01	20 October 2000 (Note: First episode to air on BBC One.)	Richard Blackwood	John Simpson	10–13	7.15m
20x02	27 October 2000	Lauren Booth	Andrew Rawnsley	11–13	6.55m
20x03	3 November 2000 (Note: The game finished as a draw at 10–10. Ian and Paul were made to play Stone, Paper, Scissors to find a winner. Ian chose Paper and Paul chose Scissors, thus making Paul's team the winners.)	Germaine Greer	Charles Kennedy MP	10–10	7.03m
20x04	10 November 2000 (Note: Ian's team had won the show 13–12, but as a 'tribute' to American guest Rich Hall, Paul's team were made the winners. This was a reference to the-then ongoing American election controversy, where George W. Bush was going to win the election even though Al Gore had seemingly received more votes than him.)	Rich Hall	Siôn Simon	13–12	n/a
20x05	18 November 2000 (Note: Moved back a day because of BBC One's coverage of Children in Need. All autumn series following this would skip Children in Need week altogether (apart from 2010, when the show had moved to Thursdays, and 2022, when the series began several weeks earlier than usual because of the 2022 FIFA World Cup).)	Linda Smith	Jeremy Bowen	17–15	6.81m
20x06	24 November 2000	Lembit Öpik MP	Lorraine Kelly	12–10	n/a
20x07	1 December 2000 (Note: The game finished as a draw at 10–10, so Angus asked a tie-break question, which was "What is the capital of Albania?", which Sanjeev correctly answered as Tirana, thus making Ian's team the winners, with the bonus point visibly shown on screen after the correct answer was given.)	Sanjeev Bhaskar	Matthew Collings	11–10	5.96m
20x08	8 December 2000	Peter Stringfellow	Nigella Lawson	11–10	6m
20x09	15 December 2000	2000 highlights			n/a

==== Have I Got Buzzcocks All Over (2001) ====
Episode	Air date	Sean Hughes' team	Nick Hancock's team	Scores
Sp.	16 March 2001	Phill Jupitus and Róisín Murphy	Stephen Fry and David Gower	9–13

=== Series 21 (2001) ===
Episode	Air date	Ian's team	Paul's team	Scores	Viewing figures
21x01	20 April 2001	John Humphrys	Tracey Emin	11–12	7.07m
21x02	27 April 2001	Bill Bailey	Dermot Murnaghan	8–14	6.47m
21x03	4 May 2001	Sean Lock	Jane Moore	13–12	6.14m
21x04	11 May 2001	Dom Joly	David Aaronovitch	13–15	5.88m
21x05	18 May 2001	Keith Chegwin	Michael Grade	7–9	5.9m
21x06	25 May 2001	Janet Street-Porter	"Sir Elton John" (Note: The real Elton John was due to appear, (Elton has News for You BBC News, 22 May 2001) but pulled out at the last minute. He was replaced by taxi driver Ray Johnson (credited as 'Ray Elton John Son'), who at the time had a side earning as the musician's lookalike. However, Johnson was introduced to the audience as if he genuinely was "Sir Elton John" and kept silent for the whole recording. On-screen captions between rounds were the only part of the show that openly admitted the deception, where the real Elton John was frequently referred to as a "bastard".)	9–7	5.89m
21x07	1 June 2001	Will Self	Derek Draper	10–9	6.63m
21x08	8 June 2001	Clive Anderson	Gyles Brandreth	5–3	6.6m

=== Series 22 (2001) ===
Episode	Air date	Ian's team	Paul's team	Scores	Viewing figures
22x01	19 October 2001	Rich Hall	Michael Crick	7–8	6.63m
22x02	26 October 2001	Andrew MacKinlay MP	Jennie Bond	8–5	6.65m
22x03	2 November 2001	Shazia Mirza	Boris Johnson MP	4–8	7.15m
22x04	9 November 2001	Rosie Boycott	Richard Bacon	7–9	6.72m
22x05	23 November 2001	Adam Boulton	Carol Thatcher	13–5	6.72m
22x06	30 November 2001	Omid Djalili	Sir Clement Freud	8–9	6.83m
22x07	7 December 2001	Sara Cox	Andrew Marr	8–10	6.25m
22x08	14 December 2001	Francis Wheen	James Naughtie	9–7	7.05m
22x09	21 December 2001	Charles Kennedy MP	John Sergeant	10–12	6.5m
22x10	31 December 2001	2001 highlights			n/a

=== Series 23 (2002) ===
Episode	Air date	Ian's team	Paul's team	Scores	Viewing figures
23x01	19 April 2002	Phill Jupitus	Evan Davis	7–6	5.69m
23x02	26 April 2002	Ben Miller	Charlotte Church (Note: Making her first appearance at the age of 16, Charlotte Church holds the record for the show's youngest ever guest.)	5–15	6.62m
23x03	3 May 2002	Penny Smith	Graeme Garden	4–14	6.07m
23x04	10 May 2002	Matthew Wright	Mark Steel	8–10	6.11m
23x05	17 May 2002	Bill Deedes	Neil Fox	8–10	6m
23x06	24 May 2002	Dave Gorman	Ken Livingstone	7–7	8.12m
23x07	31 May 2002	Linda Smith	David Dickinson	11–9	6.26m
23x08	7 June 2002	Ross Noble	Katie Derham	6–13	6.65m

=== Series 24 (2002) ===
Episode	Air date	Host	Ian's team	Paul's team	Scores	Viewing figures
24x01	18 October 2002	Angus Deayton	Christine Hamilton	Rod Liddle	12–11	6.02m
24x02	25 October 2002	Angus Deayton	Ross Noble	Gerald Kaufman MP	7–12	6.22m
24x03	1 November 2002	Paul Merton	Rich Hall	Ross Noble and Andrew Neil	21–19	6.85m
24x04	8 November 2002	Anne Robinson	John O'Farrell	John Simpson	17–20	7.62m
24x05	22 November 2002	John Sergeant	Germaine Greer	Lorraine Kelly	14–18	6.17m
24x06	29 November 2002	Boris Johnson MP	Stephen K. Amos	Clive Anderson	13–16	5.76m
24x07	6 December 2002	Liza Tarbuck	Fred MacAulay	Janet Street-Porter	15–20	6.27m
24x08	13 December 2002	Charles Kennedy MP	Robert Winston	Will Self	10–11	6.89m
24x09	20 December 2002	Jeremy Clarkson	Michael Grade	Mo Mowlam	11–16	7.02m

=== Series 25 (2003) ===
Episode	Air date	Host	Ian's team	Paul's team	Scores	Viewing figures
25x01	25 April 2003	Martin Clunes	Ruby Wax	Glenda Jackson MP	9–7	6.26m
25x02	2 May 2003	William Hague MP	Linda Smith	Jeremy Clarkson	9–14	6.84m
25x03	9 May 2003	Charlotte Church	Jimmy Carr	Jennie Bond	18–9	5.35m
25x04	16 May 2003	Alexander Armstrong	Mark Steel	Dr. Phil Hammond	11–7	7.26m
25x05	23 May 2003	John Sergeant	Dara Ó Briain	Lembit Öpik MP	9–7	5.63m
25x06	30 May 2003	Hugh Dennis	Gyles Brandreth	Martin Freeman	10–9	5.73m
25x07	6 June 2003	Sanjeev Bhaskar	Rebecca Front	Nick Robinson	13–10	6.03m
25x08	13 June 2003	Bruce Forsyth	Marcus Brigstocke	Natasha Kaplinsky	16–21	6.25m

=== Series 26 (2003) ===
Episode	Air date	Host	Ian's team	Paul's team	Scores	Viewing figures
26x01	17 October 2003	Jack Dee	Sir Clement Freud	Clare Balding	7–10	5.96m
26x02	24 October 2003	Martin Clunes	The Earl of Onslow	Linda Smith	7–12	6.15m
26x03	31 October 2003	John Humphrys	Sean Lock	Kirstie Allsopp	9–7	5.72m
26x04	7 November 2003	Jimmy Carr	Ross Noble	Sir Ian McKellen	12–14	6.39m
26x05	14 November 2003 (Note: First episode to be repeated as an extended 40-minute version)	Alexander Armstrong	Phill Jupitus	Julia Hartley-Brewer	13–9	6.61m
26x06	28 November 2003	Kirsty Young	Will Self	Jonathan Aitken	8–17	5.29m
26x07	5 December 2003	Dara Ó Briain	John O'Farrell	George Galloway MP	12–13	5.65m
26x08	12 December 2003	Boris Johnson MP	Rick Wakeman	Kate Garraway	8–10	6.09m
26x09	19 December 2003	Gyles Brandreth	Chris Addison	Carol Smillie	11–15	6.04m

=== Series 27 (2004) ===
Episode	Air date	Host	Ian's team	Paul's team	Scores	Viewing figures
27x01	16 April 2004	Alexander Armstrong	Les Dennis	Germaine Greer	10–9	5.83m
27x02	23 April 2004	Greg Dyke	Armando Iannucci	Danny Baker	6–8	6.03m
27x03	30 April 2004	Des Lynam	Marcus Brigstocke	Robert Kilroy-Silk	7–13	5.91m
27x04	7 May 2004	William Hague MP	Claudia Winkleman	Stanley Johnson	7–8	5.83m
27x05	14 May 2004	Dara Ó Briain	Carol Vorderman	Sir Michael Gambon	12–7	5.17m
27x06	21 May 2004	Alexander Armstrong	Griff Rhys Jones	Hugh Fearnley-Whittingstall	9–12	5.24m
27x07	28 May 2004	Dara Ó Briain	Julia Hartley-Brewer	Clive James	7–13	n/a
27x08	4 June 2004	Kirsty Young	Dave Gorman	John Bird	10–4	4.63m

=== Series 28 (2004) ===
Episode	Air date	Host	Ian's team	Paul's team	Scores	Viewing figures
28x01	15 October 2004 (Note: The game actually finished as a tie at 13–13, however Ian complained about leaving the score as a tie and Jack Dee duly awarded an extra point to Paul's team, thus making them the winners.)	Jack Dee	Trisha Goddard	Adam Hart-Davis	13–14	6.32m
28x02	22 October 2004	Andrew Marr	Shobna Gulati	Ross Noble	10–11	6.49m
28x03	29 October 2004	Robin Cook MP	P. J. O'Rourke	Dr. Phil Hammond	8–11	4.72m
28x04	5 November 2004	Jane Leeves	Daisy Sampson	Mark Steel	9–8	5m
28x05	12 November 2004	Des Lynam	Kaye Adams	Sean Lock	8–6	n/a
28x06	26 November 2004	Marcus Brigstocke	Michael Buerk	Tony Livesey	10–9	4.54m
28x07	3 December 2004	Neil Kinnock	Will Self	Linda Smith	6–8	4.29m
28x08	10 December 2004	Kirsty Young	Julian Fellowes	Ian McMillan	10–12	5.59m
28x09	17 December 2004	Ronnie Corbett	Amanda Donohoe	Tracey Emin	9–12	5.59m

=== Series 29 (2005) ===
Episode	Air date	Host	Ian's team	Paul's team	Scores	Viewing figures
29x01	15 April 2005	Jeremy Clarkson	Germaine Greer	Danny Baker	10–12	6.02m
29x02	22 April 2005	Alexander Armstrong	Michael Winner	Jo Caulfield	10–9	5.93m
29x03	29 April 2005	Nicholas Parsons	Julia Hartley-Brewer	Chris Langham	6–8	5.55m
29x04	6 May 2005	Kirsty Young	Andy Hamilton	Peter Oborne	5–6	5.74m
29x05	13 May 2005	Dara Ó Briain	Stephen Frost	Stephen Pound MP	3–12	5.55m
29x06	20 May 2005	Marcus Brigstocke	Robert Llewellyn	Daisy Sampson	9–12	5.48m
29x07	27 May 2005	William Hague MP	Mark Mardell	Peter Serafinowicz	11–7	4.78m
29x08	3 June 2005	Des Lynam	David Mitchell	Evan Davis	8–8	5.68m

=== Series 30 (2005) ===
Episode	Air date	Host	Ian's team	Paul's team	Scores	Viewing figures
30x01	14 October 2005	Jack Dee	Tony Livesey	Claudia Winkleman	7–10	4.48m
30x02	21 October 2005	Michael Aspel	Will Self	Bill Bailey	10–10	n/a
30x03	28 October 2005	Chris Langham	Ross Noble	Alan Duncan MP	8–9	n/a
30x04	4 November 2005	Jeremy Clarkson	Andy Hamilton	Mark Steel	9–10	4.32m
30x05	11 November 2005 (Note: Dedicated to creator and original producer Harry Thompson, who died before broadcast.)	Alexander Armstrong	Ian McMillan	Fi Glover	7–12	4.58m
30x06	25 November 2005	Boris Johnson MP	Dr. Phil Hammond	Sara Cox	7–9	5.35m
30x07	2 December 2005	Anna Ford	David Mitchell	Bob Marshall-Andrews MP	7–7	5.18m
30x08	9 December 2005	Lorraine Kelly	Robert Webb	Nick Robinson	8–9	4.75m
30x09	16 December 2005	Joan Collins	Michael Winner	Peter Serafinowicz	7–8	5.06m

=== Series 31 (2006) ===
Episode	Air date	Host	Ian's team	Paul's team	Scores	Viewing figures
31x01	21 April 2006	Sir Trevor McDonald	Lembit Öpik MP	Marcus Brigstocke	8–9	5.52m
31x02	28 April 2006	Sean Lock	Shami Chakrabarti	Peter Capaldi	9–11	5.01m
31x03	5 May 2006	Julian Clary	Quentin Letts	Alun Cochrane	9–11	4.65m
31x04	12 May 2006	Michael Buerk	David Mitchell	Diane Abbott MP	7–6	4.35m
31x05	19 May 2006	Alexander Armstrong	Fern Britton	Andy Hamilton	14–11	4.68m
31x06	26 May 2006	Carol Vorderman	Richard E. Grant	Dr. Phil Hammond	6–9	4.95m
31x07	2 June 2006	Jeremy Clarkson	Julia Hartley-Brewer	Mark Steel	7–10	4.12m
31x08	9 June 2006	Jack Dee	John O'Farrell	Liza Tarbuck	8–12	3.75m

=== Series 32 (2006) ===
Episode	Air date	Host	Ian's team	Paul's team	Scores	Viewing figures
32x01	13 October 2006	Gordon Ramsay	Peter Serafinowicz	Andrew Neil	4–7	6.48m
32x02	20 October 2006	Alistair McGowan	Alan Duncan MP	Fern Britton	8–10	4.97m
32x03	27 October 2006	Jeremy Bowen	June Sarpong	Fred MacAulay	7–11	5.18m
32x04	3 November 2006	Alexander Armstrong	Charlie Brooker	Ross Noble	13–0	5.51m
32x05	10 November 2006	Damian Lewis	Dom Joly	Neil Mullarkey	4–9	6.16m
32x06	24 November 2006	Ronni Ancona	Stewart Lee	Andy Hamilton	7–7	6.47m
32x07	1 December 2006	Ann Widdecombe MP	Lucy Porter	Danny Baker	7–4	5.27m
32x08	8 December 2006	Rob Brydon	Claudia Winkleman	Frankie Boyle	13–7	6.81m
32x09	15 December 2006	Boris Johnson MP	Emily Maitlis	Sue Perkins	10–7	5.57m

=== Series 33 (2007) ===
Episode	Air date	Host	Ian's team	Paul's team	Scores	Viewing figures
33x01	13 April 2007	Jeremy Clarkson	Michael McIntyre	Krishnan Guru-Murthy	8–6	5.79m
33x02	20 April 2007	Adrian Chiles	Daisy McAndrew	Mark Steel	7–10	5.25m
33x03	27 April 2007	Fern Britton	Reginald D. Hunter	Adam Boulton	6–10	5.54m
33x04	4 May 2007	Bill Bailey	Adam Buxton	Armando Iannucci	4–10	5.04m
33x05	11 May 2007 (Note: Ian's team were winning for the majority of the show (and actually won outright), but at the end the scores were fixed to say 45–1 to Paul's team, on account of Dr Phil Hammond's remarks that he was told he could host the show if his team won.)	Kirsty Young	Dr. Phil Hammond	Bob Marshall-Andrews MP	1–45	5.74m
33x06	18 May 2007	Chris Tarrant	Lembit Öpik MP	Andy Hamilton	5–9	5.34m
33x07	25 May 2007	Alexander Armstrong	James May	Nick Robinson	6–6	5.43m
33x08	2 June 2007 (Note: Moved back a day because of BBC One's coverage of England's first match at the rebuilt Wembley Stadium, against Brazil.)	Moira Stuart	Marcus Brigstocke	Jim Jefferies	9–7	5.04m

=== Series 34 (2007) ===
Episode	Air date	Host	Ian's team	Paul's team	Scores	Viewing figures
34x01	12 October 2007	Kirsty Young	Robert Harris	Ross Noble	6–7	5.38m
34x02	19 October 2007	Alexander Armstrong	Ed Byrne	Bob Marshall-Andrews MP	6–10	5.34m
34x03	26 October 2007	Omid Djalili	Julian Fellowes	Danny Baker	7–4	5.4m
34x04	2 November 2007	Jo Brand	Julia Hartley-Brewer	Andy Hamilton	7–9	6.18m
34x05	9 November 2007	Michael Aspel	Reginald D. Hunter	Sara Cox	7–10	5.74m
34x06	23 November 2007	Ann Widdecombe MP	Jimmy Carr	Alex James	5–8	5.57m
34x07	30 November 2007	Clive Anderson	Will Self	Chris Addison	7–9	5.29m
34x08	7 December 2007	Jack Dee	Russell Brand	Charlie Brooker	4–10	5.76m
34x09	14 December 2007	Richard Madeley	Stephen K. Amos	Lauren Laverne	9–10	6.2m

=== Series 35 (2008) ===
Episode	Air date	Host	Ian's team	Paul's team	Scores	Viewing figures
35x01	18 April 2008	Jack Dee	Bob Marshall-Andrews MP	Peter Serafinowicz	8–6	5.64m
35x02	25 April 2008	Julian Clary	Ed Byrne	Andrew Neil	7–8	4.97m
35x03	2 May 2008	Brian Blessed	Alan Duncan MP	Marcus Brigstocke	7–11	5.08m
35x04	9 May 2008	Bill Bailey	Nick Robinson	Reginald D. Hunter	11–5	5.07m
35x05	16 May 2008	Kirsty Young	Charlie Higson	Frankie Boyle	7–10	5.32m
35x06	23 May 2008	Lee Mack	Shami Chakrabarti	John O'Farrell	5–9	5.53m
35x07	30 May 2008	Alexander Armstrong	Clare Balding	Michael McIntyre	8–5	4.07m
35x08	6 June 2008	Jeremy Clarkson	Kate Silverton	Ian McMillan	5–5	4.31m

=== Series 36 (2008) ===
Episode	Air date	Host	Ian's team	Paul's team	Scores	Viewing figures
36x01	17 October 2008	Fern Britton	Tom Bradby	Mark Steel	9–7	6.16m
36x02	24 October 2008	Alexander Armstrong	Frank Skinner	Kevin Maguire	7–8	5.23m
36x03	31 October 2008	Tom Baker	Vince Cable MP	Chris Addison	4–5	4.88m
36x04	7 November 2008 (Note: US Election special)	Jo Brand	Toby Young	Reginald D. Hunter	5–7	5.96m
36x05	21 November 2008	Jack Dee	Miranda Hart	Frank Skinner (Note: Paul Merton was unable to attend the recording of this episode, so Skinner took his place as team captain) and Quentin Letts	9–6	5.4m
36x06	28 November 2008	Al Murray	Mark Watson	Germaine Greer	4–9	n/a
36x07	5 December 2008	David Mitchell	Sarah Millican	Andy Hamilton	10–7	n/a
36x08	12 December 2008	Jerry Springer	Ken Livingstone	Katy Brand	7–6	4.42m
36x09	19 December 2008	Jeremy Clarkson	Ed Byrne	Charles Kennedy MP	4–5	5.22m
36x10	24 December 2008 (Note: This episode also included a guest appearance by Brian Blessed, dressed as Father Christmas.)	Alexander Armstrong	Frank Skinner	Noddy Holder	6–8	7.65m

=== Series 37 (2009) ===
Episode	Air date	Host	Ian's team	Paul's team	Scores	Viewing figures
37x01	24 April 2009	Frank Skinner	Katy Brand	Alan Duncan MP	7–5	6.02m
37x02	1 May 2009	Damian Lewis	Chris Addison	Janet Street-Porter	5–6	5.39m
37x03	8 May 2009	Jack Dee	Fred MacAulay	Clare Balding	2–9	5.49m
37x04	15 May 2009	Rolf Harris	Andy Hamilton	Julia Hartley-Brewer	3–4	5.82m
37x05	22 May 2009	Alexander Armstrong	Stuart Maconie	Reginald D. Hunter	5–3	6.25m
37x06	29 May 2009	David Mitchell	The Rev. Richard Coles	Andrew Maxwell	5–9	3.97m
37x07	5 June 2009	Ruth Jones	Clive Anderson	Jo Caulfield	6–7	5.4m
37x08	12 June 2009	Lee Mack	Shappi Khorsandi	Hugh Fearnley-Whittingstall	5–7	5.83m

=== Series 38 (2009) ===
Episode	Air date	Host	Ian's team	Paul's team	Scores	Viewing figures
38x01	16 October 2009	Martin Clunes	Charlie Brooker	Arlene Phillips	5–9	5.73m
38x02	23 October 2009	David Mitchell	Ed Byrne	Grayson Perry	6–7	5.43m
38x03	30 October 2009	Miranda Hart	Andrew Neil	Mark Steel	9–8	5m
38x04	6 November 2009	Kirsty Young	Kevin Maguire	Ross Noble	7–6	5.02m
38x05	13 November 2009	Jack Dee	Rebecca Front	Marcus Brigstocke	4–6	4.85m
38x06	27 November 2009	Alexander Armstrong	Jimmy Carr	Bob Crow	7–4	5.08m
38x07	4 December 2009	Jo Brand	Jon Richardson	Quentin Letts	4–6	4.72m
38x08	11 December 2009	Dominic West	Reginald D. Hunter	James May	3–4	5.1m
38x09	18 December 2009	Bill Bailey	Mark Watson	Charles Kennedy MP	5–6	5.69m

=== Series 39 (2010) ===
Episode	Air date	Host	Ian's team	Paul's team	Scores	Viewing figures
39x01	1 April 2010	Lee Mack	Kevin Bridges	Nigel Farage MEP	5–7	5.51m
39x02	8 April 2010	Alexander Armstrong	Victoria Coren	Richard Herring	5–9	6m
39x03	15 April 2010	Robert Webb	David Threlfall	Marcus Brigstocke	5–9	4.97m
39x04	22 April 2010	Jeremy Clarkson	Clare Balding	Andy Hamilton	8–7	4.81m
39x05	7 May 2010 (Note: Moved back a day to the Friday slot that was regular before this series. If left, as originally scheduled, on voting day itself – before the polls closed – then the programme would have been duty bound by broadcasting impartiality rules to not show any opinionated comment on the key issues of the election.)	Jo Brand	Jon Richardson (Note: Temporarily swapped places with Paul Merton, as the two captains accepted the offer of a coalition (in a reference to the election's result of a hung parliament), which lasted for one round.)	Lembit Öpik	2–7	5.28m
39x06	13 May 2010	Martin Clunes	Julia Hartley-Brewer	Chris Addison	7–8	6.22m
39x07	20 May 2010	Eamonn Holmes	Armando Iannucci	Robert Peston	5–8	5.92m
39x08	27 May 2010	Bruce Forsyth	Laura Solon	Ross Noble	3–6	5.66m
39x09	3 June 2010	John Prescott	John Bishop	Penny Smith	2–6	5.17m

=== Series 40 (2010) ===
Episode	Air date	Host	Ian's team	Paul's team	Scores	Viewing figures
40x01	14 October 2010	Benedict Cumberbatch	Victoria Coren	Jon Richardson	5–6	5.7m
40x02	21 October 2010	Frank Skinner	Janet Street-Porter	Reginald D. Hunter	7–2	5.16m
40x03	28 October 2010	John Bishop	Miles Jupp	Andy Hamilton	6–5	5.37m
40x04	4 November 2010	Chris Addison	James Blunt	Nick Robinson	5–5	5.44m
40x05	11 November 2010	Jo Brand	Sally Bercow	Charlie Higson	4–5	5.86m
40x06	18 November 2010	Damian Lewis	Clive Anderson	Kevin Bridges	7–7	4.63m
40x07	25 November 2010	Martin Clunes	Jimmy Carr	Grayson Perry	7–5	4.92m
40x08	2 December 2010	Lee Mack	Sarah Millican	Ken Livingstone	6–7	4.95m
40x09	9 December 2010	Miranda Hart	Greg Davies	Marcus Brigstocke	3–7	5.73m
40x10	17 December 2010 (Note: Moved back a day due to the Royal Variety Performance.)	Alexander Armstrong	Ross Noble	Micky Flanagan	8–6	6.19m
40x11	24 December 2010	2010 highlights				6.66m

==== Comic Relief live special (2011) ====
Episode	Air date	Host	David Walliams' team	Clive Anderson's team	Scores
Sp.	6 March 2011 (Note: Broadcast live on the BBC website as part of 24 Hour Panel People, a fund-raising day-long marathon of panel shows, all featuring David Walliams, who took the role of captain for HIGNFY. Neither of the regular captains were present, though Paul Merton was originally scheduled to appear, before pulling out because of illness. Clive Anderson took his place in the second captain's seat.)	Patrick Kielty	Holly Walsh	Lembit Öpik	1–4

=== Series 41 (2011) ===
Episode	Air date	Host	Ian's team	Paul's team	Scores	Viewing figures
41x01	8 April 2011	Jack Dee	Caroline Wyatt	Jon Richardson	8–9	5.15m
41x02	15 April 2011	Stephen Mangan	Kevin Bridges	Bob Ainsworth MP	6–7	5.43m
41x03	22 April 2011	Rhod Gilbert	Louise Bagshawe MP	Marcus Brigstocke	5–7	5.21m
41x04	6 May 2011	Alexander Armstrong	Victoria Coren	Ross Noble	5–8	4.69m
41x05	13 May 2011 (Note: Dedicated to theme composer Big George, who died before broadcast.)	John Torode and Gregg Wallace	Samira Ahmed	Richard Herring	6–5	5.35m
41x06	20 May 2011	Alan Johnson MP	Miles Jupp	Graham Linehan	5–7	4.67m
41x07	27 May 2011	Bill Bailey	Jack Whitehall	Armando Iannucci	3–9	4.69m
41x08	3 June 2011	Sharon Horgan	Joe Wilkinson	Richard Madeley	6–9	3.84m
41x09	10 June 2011	Jo Brand	Joanna Scanlan	Reginald D. Hunter	4–7	4.57m

=== Series 42 (2011) ===
Episode	Air date	Host	Ian's team	Paul's team	Scores	Viewing figures
42x01	14 October 2011	Jo Brand	Victoria Coren	Graham Linehan	6–7	4.47m
42x02	21 October 2011	Alexander Armstrong	Louise Mensch MP	Danny Baker	6–7	4.63m
42x03	28 October 2011	Lee Mack	Victoria Derbyshire	Ross Noble	9–7	4.55m
42x04	4 November 2011	Stephen Mangan	Greg Davies	Grace Dent	8–10	5.15m
42x05	11 November 2011	David Mitchell	Roisin Conaty	Andy Hamilton	4–9	5.33m
42x06	25 November 2011	Dan Stevens	Miles Jupp	Susan Calman	2–5	4.8m
42x07	2 December 2011	Kirsty Young	Gyles Brandreth	Marcus Brigstocke	6–10	5.33m
42x08	9 December 2011	Miranda Hart	Tom Watson MP	Reginald D. Hunter	5–4	5.85m
42x09	16 December 2011	Sue Perkins	Jack Whitehall	Nick Hewer	5–4	5.7m
42x10	23 December 2011	Martin Clunes	Rebecca Front	David O'Doherty	8–4	6.11m
42x11	30 December 2011	2011 highlights				n/a

=== Series 43 (2012) ===
Episode	Air date	Host	Ian's team	Paul's team	Scores	Viewing figures
43x01	13 April 2012	Stephen Mangan	Grace Dent	Miles Jupp	8–7	6.17m
43x02	20 April 2012	Jo Brand	Humphrey Ker	Graham Linehan	7–5	5.87m
43x03	27 April 2012	Damian Lewis	Chris Packham	Susan Calman	7–8	5.37m
43x04	4 May 2012	Jeremy Clarkson	Nancy Dell'Olio	Kevin Bridges	7–9	5.63m
43x05	11 May 2012	Alexander Armstrong	Nadine Dorries MP	Reginald D. Hunter	9–5	5.72m
43x06	18 May 2012	Kathy Burke	Ken Livingstone	Joe Wilkinson	4–7	5.91m
43x07	25 May 2012	William Shatner	Charlie Brooker	Andy Hamilton	6–4	4.92m
43x08	1 June 2012	Alastair Campbell	Ross Noble	Nick Hewer	2–55	4.81m
43x09	8 June 2012	Kirsty Young	Greg Davies	Victoria Coren	5–8	5.38m

=== Series 44 (2012) ===
Episode	Air date	Host	Ian's team	Paul's team	Scores	Viewing figures
44x01	12 October 2012	Clare Balding	Graham Linehan	Ken Livingstone	6–10	5.73m
44x02	19 October 2012	Jo Brand	Will Smith	Richard Bacon	6–10	5.64m
44x03	26 October 2012	Alexander Armstrong	Victoria Coren	Conrad Black	5–10	5.73m
44x04	2 November 2012 (Note: The show ended in a 6–6 draw, so a quickfire tiebreak round was played where the panel had to identify the waxworks of the Louis Tussaud museum in Great Yarmouth, which had featured as a news item earlier in the show as it was facing closure. The attraction is infamous for the poor quality of its waxworks and the fact that most of the figures are not contemporary.)	Jeremy Clarkson	Will Gompertz	Tony Law	9–14	5.68m
44x05	9 November 2012	Damian Lewis	Nigel Farage MEP	Harry Shearer	5–7	5.47m
44x06	23 November 2012	Sir Roger Moore	Rachel Johnson	Marcus Brigstocke	8–7	4.83m
44x07	30 November 2012	Jack Whitehall	Baroness Trumpington	Nick Hewer	6–8	4.76m
44x08	7 December 2012	David Mitchell	Susan Calman	Janet Street-Porter	5–6	5.1m
44x09	14 December 2012	Charlotte Church	Richard Osman	Miles Jupp	9–5	4.86m
44x10	21 December 2012	Daniel Radcliffe	Andy Hamilton	Sara Cox	9–7	5.59m
44x11	27 December 2012	2012 highlights				n/a

=== Series 45 (2013) ===
Episode	Air date	Host	Ian's team	Paul's team	Scores	Viewing figures
45x01	5 April 2013	Stephen Mangan	Joan Bakewell	Richard Osman	11–7	6.07m
45x02	12 April 2013	Brian Blessed	Ken Livingstone	Bridget Christie	6–6	5.14m
45x03	19 April 2013	Warwick Davis	Joe Wilkinson	Gyles Brandreth	6–7	5.53m
45x04	26 April 2013	Ray Winstone	Camilla Long	Reginald D. Hunter	8–6	5.37m
45x05	3 May 2013	Mel Giedroyc	The Rev. Richard Coles	Ross Noble	5–9	5.04m
45x06	10 May 2013	Jo Brand	Michael Fabricant MP	John Cooper Clarke	3–5	5.2m
45x07	17 May 2013	Robert Lindsay	Deborah Meaden	Johnny Vegas	7–4	5.42m
45x08	24 May 2013	Alexander Armstrong	Josie Long	Jacob Rees-Mogg MP	4–6	5.18m
45x09	31 May 2013	Frank Skinner	Matt Forde	Miles Jupp	5–7	4.38m

=== Series 46 (2013) ===
Episode	Air date	Host	Ian's team	Paul's team	Scores	Viewing figures
46x01	4 October 2013	David Mitchell	Cathy Newman	Danny Baker	7–6	5.53m
46x02	11 October 2013	Richard Osman	Dan Snow	Mark Steel	7–11	4.52m
46x03	18 October 2013	Stephen Merchant	Gabby Logan	Hal Cruttenden	11–5	5.27m
46x04	25 October 2013	Jo Brand	Gyles Brandreth	John Prescott	7–9	5.26m
46x05	1 November 2013	Kirsty Young	Max Keiser	Tony Law	7–8	5.15m
46x06	8 November 2013	Alexander Armstrong	Victoria Coren Mitchell	Godfrey Bloom MEP	12–8	5.27m
46x07	22 November 2013	Jack Whitehall	Janet Street-Porter	Richard Bacon	5–10	4.8m
46x08	29 November 2013	Robert Lindsay	Katherine Ryan	Alan Johnson MP	7–8	4.57m
46x09	6 December 2013	Kathy Burke	Tim Loughton MP	Miles Jupp	6–8	n/a
46x10	13 December 2013	Martin Clunes	Jennifer Saunders	Bernard Cribbins	9–5	5.44m
46x11	20 December 2013	2013 highlights				n/a

=== Series 47 (2014) ===
Episode	Air date	Host	Ian's team	Paul's team	Scores	Viewing figures
47x01	4 April 2014	Jennifer Saunders	Sadiq Khan MP	Richard Osman	10–6	5.5m
47x02	11 April 2014	Stephen Mangan	Roisin Conaty	Nigel Farage MEP	7–6	5.41m
47x03	18 April 2014	Jeremy Clarkson	Henning Wehn	Camilla Long	8–10	5.13m
47x04	25 April 2014	Martin Clunes	Johnny Vegas	Jo Coburn	9–6	5.2m
47x05	2 May 2014	Jack Dee	Bridget Christie	Charlie Brooker	4–6	5.1m
47x06	9 May 2014	David Mitchell	Andy Hamilton	Susan Calman	10–9	5.1m
47x07	16 May 2014	Jo Brand	Jacob Rees-Mogg MP	Kevin Bridges	7–6	5.1m
47x08	23 May 2014	Kirsty Young	Ross Noble	John Cooper Clarke	9–4	4.65m
47x09	30 May 2014	Alexander Armstrong	Joe Wilkinson	Victoria Coren Mitchell	2–7	4.58m

=== Series 48 (2014) ===
Episode	Air date	Host	Ian's team	Paul's team	Scores	Viewing figures
48x01	3 October 2014	Jennifer Saunders	Peter Bone MP	Armando Iannucci	8–9	5.1m
48x02	10 October 2014	Sue Perkins	Nick Hewer	Tony Law	5–12	4.87m
48x03	17 October 2014	Frank Skinner	Nick Robinson	Sara Pascoe	9–10	4.79m
48x04	24 October 2014	Victoria Coren Mitchell	Katherine Ryan	Janet Street-Porter	7–10	5.2m
48x05	31 October 2014	Damian Lewis	Roisin Conaty	Andy Hamilton	8–3	4.84m
48x06	7 November 2014	Jo Brand	Caroline Lucas MP	Richard Osman	7–9	3.91m
48x07	21 November 2014	David Mitchell	Sara Cox	Alan Johnson MP	5–10	n/a
48x08	28 November 2014	Alexander Armstrong	Josh Widdicombe	Germaine Greer	7–6	4.71m
48x09	5 December 2014	Jack Dee	Mark Watson	Joan Bakewell	6–9	4.85m
48x10	12 December 2014	Martin Clunes	Kirsty Wark	Reginald D. Hunter	8–5	5.1m
48x11	19 December 2014	2014 highlights				4.4m

=== Series 49 (2015) ===
Episode	Air date	Host	Ian's team	Paul's team	Scores	Viewing figures
49x01	10 April 2015	Daniel Radcliffe	Diane Morgan	Armando Iannucci	8–7	5.29m
49x02	17 April 2015	Victoria Coren Mitchell	Alun Cochrane	John Prescott	5–8	5.18m
49x03	24 April 2015	Stephen Mangan	Camilla Long	Miles Jupp	6–5	5.42m
49x04	1 May 2015	Alexander Armstrong	Katherine Ryan	Michael Grade	7–5	4.5m
49x05	8 May 2015	Jo Brand	Romesh Ranganathan	Jon Snow	4–2	5.39m
49x06	15 May 2015	Robert Peston	Rob Delaney	Roisin Conaty	3–7	5.13m
49x07	22 May 2015	Frank Skinner	Cariad Lloyd	Jon Ronson	9–7	4.86m
49x08	29 May 2015	Gary Lineker	Sara Pascoe	Andy Hamilton	6–10	4.32m
49x09	5 June 2015 (Note: This episode ended with a tribute to former leader of the Liberal Democrats and nine-time HIGNFY guest Charles Kennedy, who had died earlier in the week.)	Jack Dee	James Acaster	Janet Street-Porter	5–10	5.14m

=== Series 50 (2015) ===
Episode	Air date	Host	Ian's team	Paul's team	Scores	Viewing figures
50x01	2 October 2015	Jeremy Clarkson	Camilla Long	Richard Osman	5–6	5.43m
50x02	9 October 2015	Charlie Brooker	Nish Kumar	Diane Abbott MP	4–5	4.26m
50x03	16 October 2015	Sue Perkins	Roisin Conaty	Sadiq Khan MP	8–7	4.49m
50x04	23 October 2015	Michael Sheen	Jon Richardson	Ruth Davidson MSP	7–5	4.63m
50x05	30 October 2015	David Tennant	Grayson Perry	Katherine Ryan	6–5	4.6m
50x06	6 November 2015	Kathy Burke	Cathy Newman	Ross Noble	7–8	4.55m
50x07	20 November 2015	Victoria Coren Mitchell	Hal Cruttenden	Jacob Rees-Mogg MP	4–7	5.29m
50x08	27 November 2015	Jo Brand	Josh Widdicombe	Tim Farron MP	6–4	4.5m
50x09	4 December 2015	Alexander Armstrong	Sara Pascoe	Alex Salmond MSP MP	6–10	4.36m
50x10	11 December 2015	David Mitchell	Kirsty Wark	Andy Hamilton	6–5	4.94m
50x11	18 December 2015	2015 highlights				3.96m

=== Series 51 (2016) ===
Episode	Air date	Host	Ian's team	Paul's team	Scores	Viewing figures
51x01	8 April 2016	Stephen Mangan	Henning Wehn	Suzanne Evans	4–6	5.18m
51x02	15 April 2016	Tracey Ullman	Clive Myrie	The Rev. Richard Coles	3–5	4.9m
51x03	22 April 2016	Victoria Coren Mitchell	Romesh Ranganathan	Eddie Izzard	4–6	5.24m
51x04	29 April 2016	Jo Brand	Diane Morgan	Nick Hewer	7–5	4.96m
51x05	6 May 2016	David Tennant	Phil Wang	Janet Street-Porter	6–6	5.08m
51x06	13 May 2016	Frankie Boyle	Julia Hartley-Brewer	Adil Ray	6–8	4.63m
51x07	20 May 2016	Gary Lineker	Ross Noble	Samira Ahmed	9–3	4.83m
51x08	27 May 2016	Katherine Ryan	Joe Wilkinson	Gyles Brandreth	7–4	4.43m
51x09	3 June 2016	Martin Clunes	Jason Manford	Jess Phillips MP	7–4	5.06m

=== Series 52 (2016) ===
Episode	Air date	Host	Ian's team	Paul's team	Scores	Viewing figures
52x01	7 October 2016	Nick Clegg MP	Kevin Bridges	Roisin Conaty	5–4	5.41m
52x02	14 October 2016	Stephen Mangan	Henning Wehn	Ruth Davidson MSP	5–9	5.54m
52x03	21 October 2016	Jo Brand	Tim Farron MP	Chris Kamara	2–8	5.01m
52x04	28 October 2016	David Mitchell	Rose Matafeo	Chris Bryant MP	4–9	4.96m
52x05	4 November 2016	Victoria Coren Mitchell	Tim Loughton MP	Andy Hamilton	6–7	5.14m
52x06	11 November 2016	Charlie Brooker	Maureen Lipman	Rich Hall	3–5	4.85m
52x07	25 November 2016	Alexander Armstrong	Nish Kumar	Jess Phillips MP	4–8	4.79m
52x08	2 December 2016	Tom Hollander	Hal Cruttenden	Suzanne Evans	6–8	4.46m
52x09	9 December 2016	Mel Giedroyc	Jacob Rees-Mogg MP	Adil Ray	10–7	4.87m
52x10	16 December 2016	Gary Lineker	Jon Richardson	"Handbag" (Note: The handbag was a stand-in for former Secretary of State for Education Nicky Morgan, who pulled out following controversy caused by her criticism of Prime Minister Theresa May being photographed in a £995 pair of leather trousers for The Sunday Times. The handbag was in reference to a revelation that Morgan herself owned a £950 leather handbag (of the same make used on the show).)	5–5	5.13m
52x11	23 December 2016	2016 highlights				n/a

=== Series 53 (2017) ===
Episode	Air date	Host	Ian's team	Paul's team	Scores	Viewing figures
53x01	21 April 2017	Sir Patrick Stewart	Camilla Long	Richard Osman	3–4	5.33m
53x02	28 April 2017	Kirsty Young	Jon Richardson	Robert Peston	7–9	5.22m
53x03	5 May 2017	Alexander Armstrong	Sara Pascoe	Andy Hamilton	5–7	4.97m
53x04	12 May 2017	David Harewood	Josh Widdicombe	Kirsty Wark	5–9	5.37m
53x05	19 May 2017	Frankie Boyle	Cariad Lloyd	Gyles Brandreth	6–8	4.63m
53x06	26 May 2017	Ed Balls	Henning Wehn	Janet Street-Porter	4–4	4.5m
53x07	2 June 2017 (Note: This episode was moved to BBC Two due to a Question Time special.)	Victoria Coren Mitchell	Adam Boulton	The Rev. Richard Coles	6–7	2.58m
53x08	9 June 2017	Jo Brand	Ross Noble	Alan Johnson	8–9	5.31m
53x09	16 June 2017	Adil Ray	Phil Wang	Angela Eagle MP	4–5	4.49m

=== Series 54 (2017) ===
Episode	Air date	Host	Ian's team	Paul's team	Scores	Viewing figures
54x01	6 October 2017	Alexander Armstrong	Roisin Conaty	James O'Brien	4–5	5.18m
54x02	13 October 2017	Richard Ayoade	Isabel Hardman	Andy Hamilton	4–5	4.91m
54x03	20 October 2017	Martin Clunes	Jon Richardson	Kirsty Wark	6–6	4.88m
54x04	27 October 2017	Rhod Gilbert	Lucy Prebble	Armando Iannucci	5–5	4.65m
54x05	3 November 2017	Jo Brand	Quentin Letts	Miles Jupp	5–6	4.99m
54x06	10 November 2017	Victoria Coren Mitchell	Sara Pascoe	Henry Blofeld	5–6	4.56m
54x07	24 November 2017	Stephen Mangan	Steph McGovern	Jo Caulfield	8–6	4.61m
54x08	1 December 2017	Katherine Ryan	Richard Osman	Desiree Burch	5–7	4.52m
54x09	8 December 2017	Mel Giedroyc	Hal Cruttenden	Sathnam Sanghera	3–9	4.8m
54x10	15 December 2017	David Tennant	Joe Wilkinson	Angela Rayner MP	5–4	4.79m
54x11	22 December 2017	2017 highlights				4.26m

=== Series 55 (2018) ===
Episode	Air date	Host	Ian's team	Paul's team	Scores	Viewing figures
55x01	6 April 2018	Jeremy Paxman	Steph McGovern	Josh Widdicombe	8–6	5.21m
55x02	13 April 2018	Victoria Coren Mitchell	Val McDermid	Richard Osman	7–9	5.51m
55x03	20 April 2018	Lee Mack	Janet Street-Porter	Sara Pascoe	8–8	4.67m
55x04	27 April 2018	Tracey Ullman	James Acaster	Beth Rigby	5–7	4.84m
55x05	4 May 2018	Rhod Gilbert	Baroness Warsi	Andy Hamilton	9–12	4.72m
55x06	11 May 2018	Alexander Armstrong	Sindhu Vee	Jess Phillips MP	9–11	4.04m
55x07	18 May 2018	Richard Ayoade	Robert Peston	Roisin Conaty	4–8	4.36m
55x08	25 May 2018	Jo Brand	Ross Noble	Mona Chalabi	8–14	4.52m
55x09	1 June 2018	Frank Skinner	Lucy Prebble	Henning Wehn	4–6	3.92m

=== Series 56 (2018) ===
Episode	Air date	Host	Ian's team	Paul's team	Scores	Viewing figures
56x01	5 October 2018	Alexander Armstrong	Naga Munchetty	Josh Widdicombe	7–7	4.86m
56x02	12 October 2018	Richard Ayoade	Jon Richardson	Nicky Morgan MP	2–10	4.92m
56x03	19 October 2018	Jo Brand	Grace Dent	Kiri Pritchard-McLean	6–7	4.45m
56x04	26 October 2018	Steph McGovern	Joan Bakewell	Richard Osman	6–7	4.89m
56x05	2 November 2018	Victoria Coren Mitchell	Janey Godley	Robert Rinder	3–7	4.99m
56x06	9 November 2018	David Tennant	Lucy Prebble	Reginald D. Hunter	4–6	4.85m
56x07	23 November 2018	David Mitchell	Andy Hamilton	Deborah Frances-White	5–7	n/a
56x08	30 November 2018	Jennifer Saunders	Grayson Perry	Matt Forde	6–7	n/a
56x09	7 December 2018	Danny Dyer	Judy Murray	Sara Pascoe	9–7	n/a
56x10	14 December 2018	Gary Lineker	Ayesha Hazarika	Tom Allen	4–8	4.81m
56x11	23 December 2018	2018 highlights				n/a

=== Series 57 (2019) ===
Episode	Air date	Host	Ian's team	Paul's team	Scores	Viewing figures
57x01	5 April 2019 (Note: This episode also featured a guest appearance from Peter Snow during the second round.)	David Dimbleby	Stacey Dooley	Henning Wehn	6–8	4.42m
57x02	12 April 2019	Alan Johnson	Tim Shipman	Janey Godley	6–6	4.32m
57x03	19 April 2019	Steph McGovern	Ash Sarkar	Josh Widdicombe	7–3	4.46m
57x04	26 April 2019 (Note: 500th episode)	David Tennant	Zoe Lyons	Johnny Mercer MP	5–5	4.46m
57x05	3 May 2019	Katherine Ryan	Cariad Lloyd	Andy Hamilton	4–4	4.37m
57x06	9 June 2019 (Note: Pulled from its originally scheduled 10 May 2019 airdate due to the confirmation that the 2019 European Parliament election would go ahead, which conflicted with the booking of Heidi Allen.)	Jo Brand	Heidi Allen MP	Phil Wang	6–7	n/a
57x07	17 May 2019	Rhod Gilbert	Emma Barnett	Tom Allen	6–6	4.26m
57x08	24 May 2019	Victoria Coren Mitchell	Ahir Shah	Jess Phillips MP	5–7	4.08m
57x09	31 May 2019	Richard Ayoade	Kiri Pritchard-McLean	Richard Osman	5–8	4.16m

=== Series 58 (2019) ===
Episode	Air date	Host	Ian's team	Paul's team	Scores	Viewing figures
58x01	11 October 2019	Martin Clunes	Layla Moran MP	Sara Pascoe	4–6	n/a
58x02	18 October 2019	Victoria Coren Mitchell	Ross Noble	Rachel Johnson	10–5	4.93m
58x03	25 October 2019	Steph McGovern	Camilla Long	Miles Jupp	4–5	4.87m
58x04	1 November 2019	Jo Brand	Fintan O'Toole	Zoe Lyons	6–9	4.89m
58x05	8 November 2019	Adil Ray	Helen Lewis	Ivo Graham	5–7	4.69m
58x06	22 November 2019	David Mitchell	Maisie Adam	Rory Stewart	6–2	n/a
58x07	29 November 2019	Helen McCrory	Andy Hamilton	Chris McCausland	7–7	n/a
58x08	6 December 2019	Stephen Mangan	Brian Cox	Roisin Conaty	5–10	4.77m
58x09	13 December 2019	Alexander Armstrong	Jon Richardson	Nicky Morgan	6–6	4.81m
58x10	20 December 2019	Charlie Brooker	Emma Barnett	Phil Wang	7–7	n/a
58x11	27 December 2019	2019 highlights				n/a

=== Series 59 (2020) ===
Episode	Air date	Host	Ian's team	Paul's team	Scores	Viewing figures
59x01	3 April 2020	Steph McGovern	Miles Jupp	Helen Lewis	4–7	5.65m
59x02	10 April 2020	Stephen Mangan	Zoe Lyons	The Rev. Richard Coles	6–4	4.38m
59x03	17 April 2020	Victoria Coren Mitchell	Deborah Meaden	Phil Wang	3–7	5.25m
59x04	24 April 2020	Alexander Armstrong	Henning Wehn	Emma Barnett	6–7	4.21m
59x05	1 May 2020	Romesh Ranganathan	Maisie Adam	James O'Brien	5–8	4.37m
59x06	7 May 2020 (Note: Brought forward a day due to coverage of the 75th anniversary of VE Day.)	David Tennant	Ayesha Hazarika	Chris McCausland	5–6	4.17m
59x07	15 May 2020	Jo Brand	Katy Balls	Ivo Graham	5–5	3.87m
59x08	22 May 2020	Charlie Brooker	Dr. Hannah Fry	Mark Steel	6–5	3.86m
59x09	29 May 2020	Martin Clunes	Janet Street-Porter	Fin Taylor	5–6	4.53m

=== Series 60 (2020) ===
Episode	Air date	Host	Ian's team	Paul's team	Scores	Viewing figures
60x01	2 October 2020	Damian Lewis	Katy Balls	Chris McCausland	7–8	4.23m
60x02	9 October 2020	Adil Ray	Kiri Pritchard-McLean	Nicky Morgan	4–4	3.88m
60x03	16 October 2020	Stephen Mangan	Helen Lewis	Janey Godley	5–9	4.10m
60x04	23 October 2020	Jennifer Saunders	Ayesha Hazarika	Matt Forde	5–5	4.38m
60x05	30 October 2020	Steph McGovern	Baroness Warsi	Miles Jupp	7–2	4.24m
60x06	6 November 2020	Richard Ayoade	Armando Iannucci	Roisin Conaty	3–2	4.62m
60x07	20 November 2020	Victoria Coren Mitchell	Fin Taylor	Joan Bakewell	6–7	4.48m
60x08	27 November 2020	Jo Brand	Charlene White	Reginald D. Hunter	8–6	n/a
60x09	4 December 2020	Alexander Armstrong	Phil Wang	Dr. Hannah Fry	4–6	4.24m
60x10	11 December 2020	Romesh Ranganathan	Grayson Perry	Alice Levine	5–7	3.92m
60x11	18 December 2020	2020 highlights				n/a
60x12	24 December 2020 (Note: 60-minute documentary celebrating the show's 30th anniversary.)	Have I Got 30 Years for You				n/a

=== Series 61 (2021) ===
Episode	Air date	Host	Ian's team	Paul's team	Scores	Viewing figures
61x01	12 April 2021 (Note: Pulled from its originally scheduled 9 April 2021 airdate due to the death of Prince Philip, Duke of Edinburgh. This date refers to the original airdate of the extended edition, which was broadcast as usual on BBC Two, having moved there at the start of the year.)	David Tennant	Jack Dee	Helen Lewis	6–5	4.07m
61x02	16 April 2021	Adrian Dunbar	Katherine Ryan	Tim Shipman	6–6	3.92m
61x03	23 April 2021	Victoria Coren Mitchell	Josh Widdicombe	Emma Dabiri	4–5	4.22m
61x04	30 April 2021	Alexander Armstrong	Joe Lycett	Kirsty Wark	5–7	3.63m
61x05	7 May 2021	Steph McGovern	Zoe Lyons	John Pienaar	5–7	4.47m
61x06	14 May 2021	Romesh Ranganathan	Lemn Sissay	Jo Brand	5–7	3.80m
61x07	21 May 2021	Richard Ayoade	Baroness Warsi	Richard Osman	7–6	4.30m
61x08	28 May 2021	David Mitchell	The Rev. Richard Coles	Janey Godley	5–6	4.22m
61x09	4 June 2021	Aisling Bea	Clive Myrie	Roisin Conaty	4–5	3.98m

=== Series 62 (2021) ===
Episode	Air date	Host	Ian's team	Paul's team	Scores	Viewing figures
62x01	8 October 2021	Stephen Mangan	Ria Lina	Ross Noble	4–6	3.48m
62x02	18 October 2021 (Note: Pulled from its originally scheduled 15 October 2021 airdate due to the murder of David Amess MP.)	Alexander Armstrong	Geoff Norcott	Mishal Husain	4–10	n/a
62x03	22 October 2021	Jo Brand	Rylan	Robert Peston	4–4	3.62m
62x04	29 October 2021 (Note: This episode also featured a guest appearance from Jackie Weaver during the Odd One Out round.)	Bill Bailey	Fin Taylor	Dawn Butler MP	3–4	4.41m
62x05	5 November 2021	Richard Ayoade	Roisin Conaty	Andy Hamilton	4–6	4.25m
62x06	12 November 2021	Victoria Coren Mitchell	Helen Lewis	Maisie Adam	3–6	4.13m
62x07	26 November 2021	Jack Dee	Baroness Warsi	Phil Wang	7–8	4.45m
62x08	3 December 2021	Clive Myrie	Camilla Long	Miles Jupp	3–5	4.09m
62x09	10 December 2021	Jess Phillips MP	Jon Richardson	Dr. Hannah Fry	4–7	4.37m
62x10	17 December 2021	Martin Clunes	Armando Iannucci	Steph McGovern	7–7	4.35m
62x11	31 December 2021	2021 highlights				3.32m

=== Series 63 (2022) ===
Episode	Air date	Host	Ian's team	Paul's team	Scores	Viewing figures
63x01	1 April 2022	Clive Myrie	Helen Lewis	Andy Hamilton	7–6	3.95m
63x02	8 April 2022	Victoria Coren Mitchell	Ria Lina	Tim Shipman	6–8	3.92m
63x03	15 April 2022	Jack Dee	Nabil Abdulrashid	Prof. Hannah Fry	3–8	4.20m
63x04	22 April 2022	Mel Giedroyc	Sonia Sodha	Richard Osman	7–5	4.12m
63x05	29 April 2022	Jo Brand	Camilla Long	Susie McCabe	3–7	4.02m
63x06	6 May 2022	Richard Ayoade	Justin Webb	Maisie Adam	5–8	3.99m
63x07	13 May 2022	Anna Maxwell Martin	Chris McCausland	Steph McGovern	3–6	4.12m
63x08	20 May 2022	Miles Jupp	James May	Jess Phillips MP	4–9	3.99m
63x09	27 May 2022	Jon Richardson	Phil Wang	Joan Bakewell	5–5	4.14m

=== Series 64 (2022) ===
Episode	Air date	Host	Ian's team	Paul's team	Scores	Viewing figures
64xSP	2 September 2022 (Note: "Boris Johnson special", marking his career and resignation.)	Jack Dee	Phil Wang	Janet Street-Porter	6–9	4.42m
64x01	23 September 2022 (Note: The two episodes scheduled for 9 and 16 September 2022 were cancelled following the death of Queen Elizabeth II. The episode of 9 September 2022 would have been hosted by Charlie Brooker with panellists Helen Lewis and Ivo Graham, while the one scheduled for 16 September 2022 would have been hosted by Jess Phillips MP with panellists Henning Wehn and Ruth Davidson.)	Richard Ayoade	Roisin Conaty	Mick Lynch	4–4	3.82m
64x02	30 September 2022	Alexander Armstrong	Ria Lina	Matt Chorley	3–9	4.15m
64x03	7 October 2022	Victoria Coren Mitchell	Isabel Hardman	Ivo Graham	5–9	4.20m
64x04	14 October 2022	Adil Ray	Richard Osman	Jess Phillips MP	5–6	4.39m
64x05	21 October 2022	Clive Myrie	Katy Balls	Jo Brand	5–8	5.09m
64x06	28 October 2022	Steph McGovern	Prof. Hannah Fry	Jamie MacDonald	5–7	4.74m
64x07	4 November 2022	Gary Neville	Maisie Adam	Richard Madeley	12–13	5.26m
64x08	11 November 2022	2022 highlights				

=== Series 65 (2023) ===
Episode	Air date	Host	Ian's team	Paul's team	Scores	Viewing figures
65x01	14 April 2023	Charlie Brooker	Charlotte Ivers	Miles Jupp	2–8	3.65m
65x02	21 April 2023 (Note: This episode also featured a guest appearance from Michael Sheen during the Odd One Out round.)	David Tennant	Lucy Beaumont	Richard Osman	4–14	3.75m
65x03	28 April 2023	Richard Ayoade	Marina Purkiss	Phil Wang	4–4	3.60m
65x04	5 May 2023	Alexander Armstrong	Camilla Long	Maisie Adam	7–6	3.86m
65x05	12 May 2023	Diane Morgan	Matt Chorley	Desiree Burch	3–6	4.01m
65x06	19 May 2023	Mel Giedroyc	Kirsty Wark	Chris McCausland	5–5	3.95m
65x07	26 May 2023	Steph McGovern	Carol Vorderman	Nabil Abdulrashid	7–7	3.99m
65x08	2 June 2023	Naga Munchetty	Hugh Dennis	Ruth Davidson	5–9	3.93m
65x09	9 June 2023	Harry Hill	Zing Tsjeng	Jack Dee	6–7	3.98m
65x10	16 June 2023	Clive Myrie	Munya Chawawa	Helen Lewis	4–6	4.05m

=== Series 66 (2023) ===
Episode	Air date	Host	Ian's team	Paul's team	Scores	Viewing figures
66x01	6 October 2023 (Note: In reference to a mistake by VAR Darren England from the 30 September 2023 Spurs – Liverpool game, the scores were wrongly read out as 4–6 (with the correct scores still appearing onscreen). As the credits rolled, a voiceover of a mock-VAR team approved the decision, only to "realise their own mistake" as the credits ended.)	Victoria Coren Mitchell	Ignacio Lopez	Carol Vorderman	6–4	3.58m
66x02	13 October 2023	Alexander Armstrong	Olivia Utley	Miles Jupp	6–7	3.57m
66x03	20 October 2023	Bill Bailey	Helen Lewis	Daliso Chaponda	5–9	3.95m
66x04	27 October 2023	Jack Dee	Emmanuel Sonubi	Dehenna Davison MP	4–5	3.79m
66x05	3 November 2023	Jo Brand	Zoe Lyons	Feargal Sharkey	4–6	4.23m
66x06	10 November 2023	Richard Ayoade	Jamie MacDonald	Steph McGovern	6–5	4.35m
66x07	24 November 2023	Prof. Hannah Fry	Zing Tsjeng	Stephen Mangan	4–7	4.19m
66x08	1 December 2023	Guz Khan	Janet Street-Porter	Ross Noble	6–8	3.81m
66x09	8 December 2023	Naga Munchetty	Maisie Adam	Richard Osman	2–6	4.35m
66x10	15 December 2023	Kirsty Young	Phil Wang	Armando Iannucci	2–10	4.20m
66x11	22 December 2023	2023 highlights				3.11m

=== Series 67 (2024) ===
Episode	Air date	Host	Ian's team	Paul's team	Scores	Viewing figures
67x01	5 April 2024	Clive Myrie	Marianna Spring	Jon Richardson	7–6	3.73m
67x02	12 April 2024	Prof. Hannah Fry	Ed Patrick	Zoe Lyons	5–9	3.69m
67x03	19 April 2024	Alexander Armstrong	Munya Chawawa	Jo Brand	9–8	3.97m
67x04	26 April 2024	Martin Lewis	Ignacio Lopez	Steph McGovern	3–7	4.14m
67x05	3 May 2024	Martin Clunes	Lyse Doucet	Chloe Petts	4–6	3.51m
67x06	10 May 2024	Bill Bailey	Helen Lewis	Daliso Chaponda	7–6	3.59m
67x07	17 May 2024	Jason Manford	Glenn Moore	Jess Phillips MP	3–8	3.48m
67x08	24 May 2024 (Note: Amol Rajan was scheduled to host, (Amol Rajan to host Have I Got News for You Chortle, 8 May 2024) but pulled out when the 2024 general election was called the day before the recording due to impartiality rules concerning BBC presenters.)	Phil Wang	Ruth Davidson	Richard Osman	6–7	4.13m
67x09	31 May 2024	Victoria Coren Mitchell	Sophy Ridge	Chris McCausland	9–11	3.72m
67x10	7 June 2024 (Note: Episode also featured a guest appearance from Mark Brown of The Horne Section during the second round.)	Alex Horne	Carol Vorderman	Jack Dee	3–6	4.52m

=== Series 68 (2024) ===
Episode	Air date	Host	Ian's team	Paul's team	Scores	Viewing figures
68x01	4 October 2024 (Note: Dedicated to the memory of former BBC lawyer Roger Law, who had died between series)	Kevin Bridges	Helen Lewis	Chloe Petts	3–7	3.85m
68x02	11 October 2024	Amol Rajan	Andrea Jenkyns	Miles Jupp	3–5	3.92m
68x03	18 October 2024	Prof. Hannah Fry	Phil Wang	Carol Vorderman	5–5	3.84m
68x04	25 October 2024	Charlie Brooker	Grayson Perry	Angela Barnes	5–7	3.84m
68x05	1 November 2024	Jo Brand	Nabil Abdulrashid	Tom Peck	3–8	4.30m
68x06	8 November 2024	Roy Wood Jr. (Note: Wood is the host of the American edition of the program which first aired on CNN on September 14, 2024.)	Roisin Conaty	Richard Osman	4–7	4.43m
68x07	22 November 2024	Lorraine Kelly	Matt Chorley	Maisie Adam	5–5	4.20m
68x08	29 November 2024	Victoria Coren Mitchell	Stacey Dooley	Andy Hamilton	4–9	3.85m
68x09	6 December 2024 (Note: Dedicated to the memory of founder of PR firm KPPR (which is working with HIGNFY) Katie Phillips, who had died on 28 November)	Mel Giedroyc	Anushka Asthana	Jamie MacDonald	4–5	3.87m
68x10	13 December 2024	Stephen Mangan	Rachel Parris (Note: Chris McCausland stated in a Virgin Radio UK interview that he was booked to appear in this episode as he did not anticipate making it to the final as a contestant on Strictly Come Dancing series 22. However, McCausland was unable to attend the HIGNFY recording because he was rehearsing for the Strictly final, which he went on to win.)	Ed Davey MP	4–7	4.14m
68x11	27 December 2024	Have I Got 2024 for You				3.39m

==== Have I Got Sport for You (2025) ====
Episode	Air date	Host	Maisie Adam's team	Jon Richardson's team	Scores
Sp.	3 January 2025 (Note: Special programme of Have I Got News for You with the news from 2024 revolving around sports.)	Jason Manford	Eddie Hearn and Katarina Johnson-Thompson	Kadeena Cox and Stuart Broad	8–9

=== Series 69 (2025) ===
Episode	Air date	Host	Ian's team	Paul's team	Scores	Viewing figures
69x01	4 April 2025	Alexander Armstrong	Phil Wang	Steph McGovern	5–7	3.74m
69x02	11 April 2025	Martin Clunes	Ian Smith	Helen Lewis	4–5	3.98m
69x03	18 April 2025	Katherine Parkinson	Jemima Kelly	Julian Clary	4–6	4.36m
69x04	25 April 2025	Angela Rippon	Jo Brand	Richard Osman	3–4	4.48m
69x05	2 May 2025	Sue Perkins	Michelle Wolf	Tom Peck	5–5	4m
69x06	9 May 2025	David Tennant	Cathy Newman	Miles Jupp	6–4	3.95m
69x07	16 May 2025	Stephen Mangan	Chloe Petts	Andy Hamilton	3–9	3.65m
69x08	23 May 2025	Victoria Coren Mitchell	Chris McCausland	Janet Street-Porter	5–6	4.13m
69x09	30 May 2025 (Note: Dedicated to the memory of Alan Yentob, who died on 24 May 2025.)	Roy Wood Jr.	Guz Khan	Kirsty Wark	2–4	3.96m
69x10	6 June 2025	Richard Ayoade	Kelly Cates	Jack Dee	7–8	3.79m

=== Series 70 (2025) ===
Episode	Air date	Host	Ian's team	Paul's team	Scores	Viewing figures (Note: 7-day consolidated; includes viewership recorded for the Monday 10:40pm repeat, which - as of series 70 - is now the standard 30-minute version as opposed to an extended 45-minute iteration.)
70x01	3 October 2025	Victoria Coren Mitchell	Sheila Hancock	Miles Jupp	4–6	4.59m
70x02	10 October 2025	Steph McGovern	Salma Shah	Stephen Mangan	4–5	5.02m
70x03	17 October 2025	Alexander Armstrong	Ross Noble	Helen Lewis	4–8	5.30m
70x04	24 October 2025	Adil Ray	Sophy Ridge	Julian Clary	6–6	5.17m
70x05	31 October 2025	Jason Manford	Laura Smyth	Louise Haigh MP	3–7	5.58m
70x06	7 November 2025	Katherine Ryan	Lewis Goodall	Maisie Adam	5–3	5.22m
70x07	21 November 2025	Gabby Logan	Cathy Newman	Nish Kumar	3–6	5.34m
70x08	28 November 2025	Richard Ayoade	Bella Hull	Richard Osman	4–4	5.36m
70x09	5 December 2025	Prof. Hannah Fry	Finlay Christie	The Rev. Richard Coles (Note: Rev. Coles was a late replacement for Green Party leader Zack Polanski, who appeared on Question Time - recorded on the same evening - instead.)	3–6	5.62m
70x10	12 December 2025	Martin Clunes	Phil Wang	Janet Street-Porter	5–6	5.37m
70x11	19 December 2025	Have I Got 2025 for You				4.13m

=== Series 71 (2026) ===
Episode	Air date	Host	Ian's team	Paul's team	Scores	Viewing figures
71x01	3 April 2026	Roy Wood Jr.	Anushka Asthana	Armando Iannucci	5–6	5.27m
71x02	10 April 2026	Monty Don	Helen Lewis	Chris McCausland	5–6	4.98m
71x03	17 April 2026	Gabby Logan	Michelle Wolf	Miles Jupp	4–5	5.12m
71x04	24 April 2026	Sue Perkins	Finlay Christie	Camilla Long	3–8	5.32m
71x05	1 May 2026	Richard Ayoade	Ava Santina Evans	Stephen Mangan	4–7	5.34m
71x06	8 May 2026 (Note: This episode was shown on BBC Two, due to BBC One broadcasting an event commemorating David Attenborough's 100th birthday during its scheduled timeslot.)	Steph McGovern	Dame Sheila Hancock (Note: Making her third appearance at the age of 93, Dame Sheila holds the record for the show's oldest ever guest (when ranking by age at time of appearance).)	Jon Richardson	3–6	4.30m
71x07	15 May 2026	Victoria Coren Mitchell	Bella Hull (Note: Replacing Roisin Conaty, who was originally booked.)	Karl Turner MP	4–7	5.22m
71x08	22 May 2026	Alexander Armstrong	Phil Wang	Judi Love	7–4	5.52m
71x09	29 May 2026	Katherine Ryan	John Tothill	Jo Coburn	6–4	5.38m
71x10	5 June 2026	David Tennant	Chloe Petts	Michael Gove	3–5	5.47m

=== Series 72 (2026) ===
Episode	Air date	Host	Ian's team	Paul's team	Scores	Viewing figures
72x01	2 October 2026	Richard Ayoade	Charlotte Church	Gyles Brandreth	3–6	
72x02	9 October 2026	Alex Jones	Tom Peck	Chloe Petts	3–5	
72x03	16 October 2026	Jason Manford	Janet Street-Porter	Zoe Lyons	8–4	
72x04	23 October 2026	Amol Rajan	Salma Shah	Phil Wang	8–6	
72x05	30 October 2026 (Note: This episode was shown at the earlier time of 7:30pm, to accommodate the feature-length finale of The Celebrity Traitors and its companion show, Uncloaked.)	Victoria Coren Mitchell	Ava Santina Evans	Julian Clary	4–6	
72x06	6 November 2026	Steph McGovern	John Tothill	Helen Lewis	4–8	
72x07	20 November 2026	Kelly Cates	Krishnan Guru-Murthy	Maisie Adam	4–7	
72x08	27 November 2026	Alexander Armstrong	Chris McCausland	Cindy Yu		
72x09	4 December 2026	Katherine Ryan	Cathy Newman	Richard Osman		
72x10	11 December 2026		Lucy Prebble	Ross Noble		

== Scores ==
Ian	Paul
Series wins (10 / 14.1% drawn)
5 (7%)	56 (78.9%)
Episode wins (40 / 6.3% drawn)
184 (28.8%)	415 (64.9%)
