= Cules =

Cules may refer to:

- Cambridge University Light Entertainment Society (CULES)
- Supporters of FC Barcelona, culés, Spanish variant of Catalan culers
