= John Tothill =

English stand-up comedian

- Education: Clare College, Cambridge (BA)
- Occupations: Comedian and actor

John Tothill is an English stand-up comedian and actor. He was nominated for Best Show at the Edinburgh Comedy Awards in 2025.

== Career ==
Tothill was formerly a primary school teacher in Southend-on-Sea and was a member of the Cambridge Footlights during his time studying music at Clare College, Cambridge.

Tothill began stand-up comedy in November 2022 and made his Edinburgh Fringe Festival debut performing his one man stand-up comedy show The Last Living Libertine in August 2023 at the Pleasance Courtyard. In order to fund the show Tothill took part in a drugs trial for an anti-malaria drug but having been injected with a strain of the disease, felt symptoms of the disease beyond the doctors' expectations.

He returned to Edinburgh the following year with the show Thank God This Lasts Forever, however his run of performances was impeded by a burst appendix. Waiting until his rest day to consult medical advice, his body went into intra-abdominal sepsis and had to ultimately cancel nine shows, but Tothill quipped "They cut through my stomach muscles so I couldn’t sit up. I couldn’t eat. But obviously it was less painful than what I’d been going through previously…Writing a standup show".

His 2025 one-man show This Must Be Heaven was nominated for the Edinburgh Comedy Award. In 2025, he joined the cast of Channel 4 comedy series It Gets Worse, created by Leo Reich and produced by A24.

Tothill appeared on Ian Hislop's team on Have I Got News for You for the ninth episode of series 71, broadcast on BBC One on 29 May 2026.

== Personal Life ==
Tothill is a former schoolteacher.
