= Blind Ambition =

Blind Ambition may refer to:

- Blind Ambition, a book attributed to John Dean which was ghostwritten by Taylor Branch
- Blind Ambition (miniseries), a 1979 TV miniseries based on the book about John Dean
- "Blind Ambition" (Brandy & Mr. Whiskers episode)
- "Blind Ambition" (Family Guy)", a television episode of Family Guy
- "Blind Ambitions", a television episode of The Golden Girls
- Blind Ambition (TV programme), a 2021 BBC2 television documentary featuring Jamie MacDonald
- Blind Ambition (2022 film), based on four Zimbabwean refugee wine-tasters
