= Andy Hamilton =

British comedian and writer

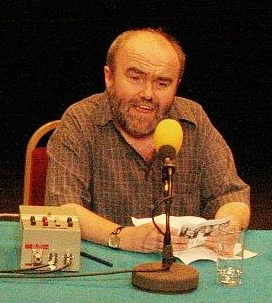
- Hamilton in 2007
- Born: Andrew Neil Hamilton; Fulham, London, England
- Education: Downing College, Cambridge (BA)
- Notable work: Old Harry's Game; Outnumbered
- Spouse: Libby Asher
- Children: 3

Comedy career
- Years active: 1972–present
- Medium: Radio, television
- Genre: Political satire
- Subject: Politics

Andrew Neil Hamilton is a British comedian, film and television director, comedy screenwriter, radio dramatist and novelist.

== Early life and education ==
Hamilton was born in Fulham, West London. He was educated at Westminster City School which was then a voluntary aided grammar school and later read English at Downing College, Cambridge, where he was a member of the Cambridge University Light Entertainment Society (CULES).

== Career ==
Hamilton first came to notice while performing at the Edinburgh Festival Fringe in the 1970s. In the mid-1970s he sustained himself by taking jobs at Harrods and the Post Office before joining the BBC in 1976.

His early radio work, mostly on BBC Radio 4, included Week Ending, The News Huddlines and The Million Pound Radio Show (with Nick Revell). He has since appeared regularly in Chelmsford 123, Have I Got News for You, The News Quiz, QI, and If I Ruled the World.

On television, he has been a regular contributor to a range of comedy programmes, and co-created The Kit Curran Radio Show, Drop the Dead Donkey, and Outnumbered with Guy Jenkin.

He is the voice of Dr Elephant, the dentist in the animation series Peppa Pig. He was also the original voice of Bob Fish, who is also a dentist, in the cartoon Bob and Margaret. Hamilton is also the voice of Captain Squid, the pirate in the children's show Ben & Holly's Little Kingdom.

On 16 March 2007, he co-presented BBC Radio 4's Woman's Hour programme alongside usual presenter Martha Kearney as part of that day's Comic Relief fundraising activities, after defeating Richard Hammond and Kelvin MacKenzie in a poll.

Since 1995, Hamilton has written and played the lead role of Satan in the Radio 4 sitcom Old Harry's Game. He toured with his UK stand-up show Hat of Doom in 2008.

In 2009, Hamilton presented the BBC Four series It's Only a Theory with Reginald D. Hunter.

BBC Radio 4 broadcast two four-part series of Andy Hamilton Sort of Remembers, in 2017 and 2018. Series 1 comprised the topics of childhood, politics, the human body, and animals, based on his own personal experiences of them.

== Personal life ==
He has no thumb on his right hand. He joked that it was amputated when he was five "by a surgeon who felt that symmetry was over-rated" to the audience of Andy Hamilton Sort of Remembers on Radio 4 in October 2017.

Hamilton is married to Libby Asher, a native of Nairn, Scotland. They have three children.

== Writing ==
Hamilton has written for:

=== Television ===
- The Two Ronnies (1971–1987)
- Not the Nine O'Clock News (1979)
- The Dawson Watch (1979–1980)
- Shelley (1979)
- Scotch and Wry (1980)
- Who Dares Wins (1983)
- Alas Smith & Jones (1984)
- The Kit Curran Radio Show (1984)
- Kit Curran (1986, with Guy Jenkin)
- Scotch & Wry (1986)
- Drop the Dead Donkey (1990, co-creator with Guy Jenkin)
- Eleven Men Against Eleven (1995)
- Never Mind the Horrocks (1996)
- Underworld (1997)
- Bob and Margaret (1998–2000)
- Bedtime (2001–2003)
- The Exam (2002, for the National Theatre Connections Anthology)
- Trevor's World of Sport (2003)
- The Armstrong and Miller Show (2007)
- Outnumbered (2007–2014, co-written with Guy Jenkin)
- It's Only a Theory (2009)
- Just Around The Corner (2012, Pilot only, co-written with Guy Jenkin)
- Ballot Monkeys (2015)
- Power Monkeys (2016)
- Kate & Koji (2020–2022, co-written with Guy Jenkin)

=== Radio ===
- The Million Pound Radio Show (with Nick Revell)
- The News Huddlines
- Old Harry's Game (creator, in which he also stars as Satan)
- Trevor's World of Sport (radio version broadcast years: 2004, 2005 and 2007)
- Revolting People (co-creator with Jay Tarses, in which he also stars as Sergeant McGurk)
- Week Ending
- Andy Hamilton Sort of Remembers

=== Film ===
- What We Did on Our Holiday (2014, with Guy Jenkin)

=== Books ===
- The Thatcher Papers (New English Library, 1980) (with Alistair Beaton)
- Andy Hamilton (1994), Drop the Dead Donkey 2000, London: Little, Brown, ISBN 0316912360, OL 22627103M, 0316912360
- "The Star Witness" (Unbound Publishers, ISBN 1783522984, 2016), "Like its author, this book is funny, poignant and too short" - Jack Dee
- "Longhand" - Unbound Publishers, ISBN 9781783529414, 2020
