= The Sunday Show =

- Genre: Entertainment
- Country of origin: United Kingdom
- Original language: English
- No. of series: 4
- No. of episodes: 38 (inc. 2 specials)

Production
- Production location: New Broadcasting House
- Running time: 45 minutes
- Production company: BBC North

Original release
- Network: BBC Two
- Release: 5 March 1995 – 28 December 1997

The Sunday Show was a British entertainment show that was broadcast on BBC Two from 5 March 1995 to 28 December 1997. Donna McPhail and Katie Puckrik hosted the first two series, Puckrik was replaced by Paul Tonkinson for the third series. For the fourth, Tonkinson hosted with Jenny Ross, previously the show's Pop Desk presenter.

The show is best remembered for giving breaks to two young comedians who went on to greater success: Paul Kaye, who appeared each week in his Dennis Pennis character, attending premieres and other events, and throwing absurd questions at the gathered celebrities; and Peter Kay, who presented a regular "World of Entertainment" slot ostensibly reviewing TV and film but, in practice, this was simply a vehicle for his stand-up comedy act.

Other regular contributors included Kevin Eldon in different guises, including 'Guy Boudelaire' and 'Dr Brebner', and Happy Mondays' dancer/mascot/percussionist Bez in a weekly "Science With Bez" slot.

== Transmissions ==
=== Series ===
Series	Start date	End date	Episodes
1	5 March 1995	9 April 1995	6
2	15 October 1995	17 December 1995	10
3	13 October 1996	22 December 1996	11
4	12 October 1997	21 December 1997	11

=== Specials ===
Date	Entitle
25 December 1996	1996 Highlights
28 December 1997	1997 Highlights
