= It Gets Worse (TV series) =

British-Canadian television sitcom

- Genre: Sitcom
- Created by: Leo Reich
- Written by: Leo Reich
- Directed by: Mounia Akl
- Starring: Leo Reich; Emily Fairn; Olive Gray
- Narrated by: Zadie Smith
- Composer: Taylor Syke
- Countries of origin: United Kingdom; Canada
- Original language: English
- No. of series: 1
- No. of episodes: 6

Production
- Executive producers: Rose Garnett; Piers Wenger; Harpa Manku; Leo Reich
- Producer: Sam Pinnell
- Cinematography: Matthew Lewis
- Editors: Christopher Watson; Josh Mallalieu
- Running time: 23–24 minutes
- Production company: A24

Original release
- Network: Channel 4 (United Kingdom); Crave (Canada)
- Release: 22 October 2026 – present

It Gets Worse is a television sitcom written, created by and starring Leo Reich and produced by A24 for Channel 4 and Crave, which both released on 22 October 2026.

== Premise ==
Three best friends from university living in London in their mid-twenties face eviction from their landlord.

== Cast ==
=== Main ===
- Leo Reich as Ethan
- Emily Fairn as Abi
- Olive Gray as Sam

=== Recurring and guest ===
- Gary Beadle as Sandy
- Simon Haines as Lucas
- Lena Dunham as Greta, the CEO of Abi's company
- Andrew Scott as Brian, a therapist who Ethan hooks up with
- Sean Delaney as Tom, Abi's boyfriend
- Dane Williams as Aaron
- India Mullen as Zara
- Safia Oakley-Green as Tess
- John Tothill as Leon
- Arian Nik as Jesse
- Amelia Dimoldenberg as Emily
- Blake Harrison as Roger
- Nicole Sadie Sawyerr as Jessica
- Phil Zimmerman as Street Preacher
- Billy Rilot as Jake
- Kirsty Bloom as Millie
- Clayton Pettet as Freddy
- Luca Kamleh-Chapman as Ashraf
- Vicki Pepperdine as Sarah
- Daniel Monks as Celebrant
- Emmeline Downie as Louise
- Oliver Wickham as Avalon Cafe Performer
- Shef Phoenix as Online Chef

Zadie Smith serves as the show's narrator

== Episodes ==
No.	Title	Directed by	Written by	Original release date
1	"Ethan"	Mounia Akl	Leo Reich	October 22, 2026
2	"Abi"	Mounia Akl	Leo Reich	October 22, 2026
3	"Sam"	Mounia Akl	Leo Reich	October 22, 2026
4	"Everyone Else Is Taken"	Mounia Akl	Leo Reich	October 22, 2026
5	"Stop All The Cocks"	Mounia Akl	Leo Reich	October 22, 2026
6	"People Team"	Mounia Akl	Leo Reich	October 22, 2026

== Production ==
In February 2025, Channel 4 announced the commission of the comedy series It Gets Worse, written, created and starring Leo Reich. The series is produced by A24 and co-produced by Canadian company Crave. The series is narrated by Zadie Smith.

Filming began in 2025 with Mounia Akl as director and Sam Pinnell as series producer. First look images from filming were released in October.

Joining Leo Reich in the cast were Emily Fairn, Olive Gray, Sean Delaney, Dane Williams, India Mullen and John Tothill as well as Safia Oakley-Green, Lena Dunham, Andrew Scott, Arian Nik, Blake Harrison and Amelia Dimoldenberg.

== Release ==
In the United Kingdom, the series began airing on Channel 4 on 22 October 2026. It premiered at the 70th BFI London Film Festival on the same date.

In Canada, the series was released exclusively on Crave as a Crave Original on 22 October 2026.

In the United States, the series was released with all six episodes on 6 November 2026 on Paramount+ as a Showtime original. The streamer have also acquired the series for the release in Latin America, Brazil and Italy.

== Critical reception ==
On the review aggregator website Rotten Tomatoes, 94% of 18 critics' reviews are positive, with an average rating of 6.90/10. Metacritic, which uses a weighted average, assigned the series a score of 78 out of 100, based on 13 critics, indicating "generally favorable" reviews.

In a 4/5 star review for The Guardian, Hannah J Davies described the series as being "truly funny", noting that Reich's "zinger filled" scripts were "often profound". Adam White in a more critical review for The Independent found the series "over-written and over-familiar, paling in comparison to the shows that inspired it".
