= Marianna Spring =

British journalist (born 1996)

- Born: 21 February 1996 (age 30)
- Education: Pembroke College, Oxford
- Occupation: Journalist

Marianna Spring (born 21 February 1996) is a British broadcast journalist. She is the BBC's first disinformation specialist and social media correspondent.

== Early life ==
Spring was born on 21 February 1996. Her father is a doctor and her mother is a family therapist and former nurse. She grew up in Sutton, South London, and has a younger sister. Spring said she developed an interest in journalism at the age of eight, and would watch BBC World News while on holiday.

Spring attended Sutton High School, London, and became involved in a programme run by Newsquest for young journalists, winning an award for best news article of 2011 by a Year Eleven student. Spring was also a ball girl at Wimbledon while at school. She studied French and Russian at Pembroke College, Oxford (matriculating in 2014) and wrote for and edited the student newspaper Cherwell. While there, Spring won the Ronnie Payne Prize for Outstanding Foreign Reporting in 2017, and later spent her year abroad in Yaroslavl (Russia), and Paris, contributing news articles to The Moscow Times, The Local, and Le Tarn Libre. Spring undertook work experience at The Guardian and Private Eye.

== Career ==
After graduation, Spring applied for various journalism programmes including at the BBC but was not successful. Senior news reporter for The Guardian Alexandra Topping suggested that she contact various BBC journalists that she admired. Emily Maitlis replied to Spring and gave her an opportunity to work on Newsnight. She co-produced a segment for the programme, about protesters from across the French political spectrum joining the gilets jaunes, in December 2018.

"The focus of my job is to humanise disinformation and explain its impact to viewers, listeners and readers."

— Spring describing her role in March 2021

In March 2020, she was appointed the BBC's first specialist disinformation and social media reporter, which followed the establishment of similar roles at American news organisations such as CNN and NBC. In 2021, Spring began working as a reporter for the investigative current affairs programme Panorama, and was selected by Forbes magazine as one of their "30 Under 30" in the Media and Marketing category.

She was promoted to correspondent in August 2022. Spring was nominated as Young Talent of the Year at the Royal Television Society's Journalism Awards in 2023. In March 2023, she wrote an article for the BBC News on an increase in trolling and online abuse on Twitter under Elon Musk. Musk responded by mockingly tweeting a screenshot of the article. This led to an increase in abuse towards Spring, who told The Sunday Times in August 2023 that according to an internal BBC monitoring system she had received more than 80% of all online abuse directed at BBC journalists in the first six months of the year.

In September 2023, The New European alleged that Spring had previously lied on a CV when applying for a job in 2018 in Moscow for U.S.-based news website Coda Story. She had claimed that in 2018 she worked alongside BBC Eastern Europe correspondent Sarah Rainsford. Following Rainsford's statement that she had only met Spring in social situations, Spring apologised for the "awful misjudgement", and further added, "I've only bumped into Sarah whilst she's working and chatted to her at various points, but nothing more. Everything else on my CV is entirely true".

Since 2022, Spring has been a regular contributor to the BBC podcast and Radio 4 programme Americast, for which using data supplied by the Pew Research Center, she created social media accounts for five "undercover voters" from across the political spectrum in order to report on the content they were receiving. Her debut book, Among the Trolls: Notes from the Disinformation Wars, was published by Atlantic Books in March 2024.

In April 2024, she was a guest on the first episode of the sixty-seventh series of BBC One satirical panel show Have I Got News for You.

== Television ==
Year(s)	Title	Role	Notes	Ref(s)
2021–2024	Panorama	Reporter	Episode: "Vaccines: The Disinformation War"; Episode: "Online Abuse: Why Do You Hate Me?"; Episode: "A Social Media Murder: Olly's Story"; Episode: "Disaster Deniers: Hunting the Trolls"; Episode: "Elon Musk's Twitter Storm"; Episode: "Trump: The Sequel?"	
2023	The TikTok Effect	Presenter	Television film	
2026	Inside the Rage Machine	Presenter	Television Special	

== Radio ==
Year(s)	Title	Role	Notes	Ref(s)
2016	BBC Trending	Reporter	Podcast	
2020	How to Cure Viral Misinformation	Presenter	Podcast	
2020–present	Americast	Co-host	Podcast	
2021	The Anti-Vax Files	Presenter	Podcast	
2021	The Denial Files	Presenter	Podcast	
2022	Death by Conspiracy?	Presenter	Podcast	
2022	War on Truth	Presenter	Podcast	
2022	Disaster Trolls	Presenter	Podcast	
2023–2025	Marianna in Conspiracyland	Presenter	Podcast	
2024	Why Do You Hate Me?	Presenter	Podcast	
2026	Top Comment	Co-host	Podcast	
