= It's Only a Theory =

- Created by: Andy Hamilton
- Directed by: Paul Wheeler; Ian Lorimer
- Starring: Andy Hamilton; Reginald D. Hunter
- Country of origin: United Kingdom
- Original language: Language
- No. of series: 1
- No. of episodes: 8

Production
- Producer: Adam King
- Running time: 30 minutes
- Production company: Hat Trick Productions

Original release
- Network: BBC Four
- Release: 6 October – 24 November 2009

It's Only a Theory is a British television panel game show, first aired on BBC Four in 2009. It was conceived by and starred Andy Hamilton and featured Reginald D. Hunter as a regular panelist. Announced by the BBC in April 2009, the eight-episode series was produced by Hat Trick Productions.

The panelists discuss theories "about life, the universe and everything" submitted by professionals and experts. The panel debates each theory and decides whether it is worth keeping.

== Guests ==
The two regular panelists were joined by one guest in each of the episodes.

No.	Guest	Original release date
1	Clare Balding	6 October 2009
2	Martha Kearney	13 October 2009
3	Kirsty Wark	20 October 2009
4	Clare Balding	27 October 2009
5	Martha Kearney	3 November 2009
6	Vince Cable	10 November 2009
7	Dermot Murnaghan	17 November 2009
8	Clare Balding	24 November 2009

== Reception ==
The first episode in the series received a number of reviews from critics. Writing for The Times, Andrew Billen gave the programme 3 out of 5, saying it "must be the most intelligent parlour game since QI". Describing the idea for the programme "strange", Sam Wollaston for The Guardian said: "I'm not sure it totally works. But it doesn't really matter, because you get to see cool people like Aubrey de Grey [who submitted a theory], who clearly should get his own show." However, The Independent's Tom Sutcliffe found it "very difficult to work out what it's for or how it's meant to work", going on the say: "It isn't that the machinery doesn't work, it's that they completely forgot to put the machinery in."
