= Donna McPhail =

British comedian

- Born: 1 September 1962 (age 63); London
- Occupation: Comedian

Donna McPhail is a former British stand-up comedian who has also worked as a television presenter and journalist.

McPhail is from London and was noted for her stand-up comedy in the 1990s, most prominently in her nomination for the Perrier Comedy Award in 1993.

McPhail hosted BBC Two's The Sunday Show (1995–1996), a studio-based comedy programme which also starred Katie Puckrik, Paul Kaye (in his Dennis Pennis persona) and Paul Tonkinson.

McPhail has also written for a monthly column for Diva, the UK's bestselling magazine for lesbians.

== Television appearances ==
- StandUp (Granada Television)
- The Comedy Club (London Weekend Television)
- Have I Got News for You (BBC)
- Without Walls (Channel 4)
- Edinburgh Nights (BBC)
- Reportage (BBC)
- Just For Laughs (Channel 4 & CBC)
- The Stand-Up Show (BBC)
- Never Mind The Buzzcocks (BBC)
- The Staying In Show (Channel 4, pilot only)

== Radio credits ==
- Loose Ends (BBC Radio 4)
- Loose Talk (BBC Radio 1)
- Room 101 (BBC Radio 5)
- The Mark Radcliffe Show (BBC Radio 1)
- Woman's Hour (BBC Radio 4)
- Missed Demeanours (BBC Radio 4)
- Currently presents her own show on GLR.
- Co-wrote and presented two series of Windbags with Jo Brand for BBC Radio 1.
- The Mary Whitehouse Experience (BBC Radio 1)

== Stand-up comedy ==
- Melbourne Comedy Festival.
- Montreal Just For Laughs Festival
- Edinburgh Fringe Festival.
- A nationwide tour in spring 1996, that culminated in two sell-out performances at the Duke of York Theatre in London.
