= Cambridge University Light Entertainment Society =

Student drama society

The Cambridge University Light Entertainment Society (CULES) is a student drama society at the University of Cambridge. Notable alumni include Douglas Adams, John Cleese, Prince Edward, Tim Brooke-Taylor, Andy Hamilton and Graeme Garden.

CULES is a non-profit society, and emphasises 'non-serious' theatre, comic pun-filled scripts, and including those who do not wish to become 'serious' actors.

== History ==
=== Early years ===
CULES was founded in 1958. Performing revues and comic sketches, it could boast such future celebrities as John Cleese and Graeme Garden amongst its members (with Flanders and Swann as honorary presidents of the society).

In the 1970s, the focus shifted to more music-hall shows, often performed in homes for the elderly. During this period, the likes of Andy Hamilton and Douglas Adams were members (the latter, having found Footlights "aloof and rather pleased with themselves", joined CULES instead). These were complemented by musicals and revues in the 1980s, with members such as Sandi Toksvig and Prince Edward.

=== Recent history ===
The society returned to comedy and pantomime in the 1990s and 2000s, interpreting stories such as Dick Whittington, The Wind in the Willows and Snow White. After a brief lull in the early 2000s, when membership was down to just a handful of students, CULES was revived in 2002 after a successful pantomime of Little Red Riding Hood. Since then, there have been two parallel productions for each term. 2003 saw the introduction of an Easter term production of four short plays around a common theme (for example, in 2003, Shakespeare was parodied in CULES productions of Othello, Romeo and Juliet, The Tempest and Macbeth).

The society has adapted Cinderella and The Lion, the Witch and the Wardrobe for pantomime, performed plays such as A Charming Little Murder Mystery and Diary of a Nobody. It has even created entirely new pantomime scripts (for example Once Upon a Time).

=== Links with Oxford and other Light Entertainment Societies ===
As the society grew, it reestablished links with its sister society at the University of Oxford, the Oxford University Light Entertainment Society (OULES), which had been re-founded by a former CULES member several years previously. Every summer, the two societies had organised a joint production in the form of VOLES (the Various Other Light Entertainment Societies), which mostly performed for homes for the elderly in rural Britain. In addition to VOLES, the two societies organised an annual Varsity match (in the tradition of rivalry between the two universities). The two societies would perform a play jointly, with one performing the first act, the other the second, and the third being performed by a mixed cast, the winner being declared by a panel of judges, who would award points not only for acting, but also for improvisation, phony accents, and use of spurious words, amongst others. The first Varsity match, in 2003, was a tie (won by Oxford after a tiebreaking game of rock, paper, scissors), and the tradition has continued since.

The University of Sheffield Light Entertainment Society was set up by OULES members.

== Activities ==
Each term, the society performs one or more pieces of (usually comic) theatre, with emphasis on low budget and high creativity. Staples include pantomime, comic plays, revues, and skits, but in the past the society has also shot a short film and put on a music talent competition, amongst others. All are invariably realised on a minimal budget to maximise the donations to charity. CULES performances can be demanding, with difficult audiences (for instance, disabled children, or hospital patients...) and highly improvised facilities (such as a school gymnasium).

The pantomimes performed are almost always written by members of the society, and include many parodies of popular songs (such songs by ABBA or Queen) with accompanying dance moves, while the comic plays may be original works or adaptations (such as the Jeeves and Wooster plays by P. G. Wodehouse, or a play by Oscar Wilde), see below), through making full use of the members' (sometimes unusual) possessions and creative talents. Elaborate costumes and props are often created at great effort, with little more than cloth, cardboard and string – often adding to the humour in a production.

In Michaelmas and Lent terms, the productions are taken to special needs schools, homes for the elderly, homeless shelters, and hospital wards, for whose occupants these performances often represent a welcome departure from an otherwise monotonous daily routine. A final performance is organised for the students of the university. This final performance often entails script changes, usually through adding lewd or suggestive dialogue which would not have been appropriate for other audiences.

In Easter term, the schedule is compressed into the final week, before May Week. The productions during Easter term tend to have much smaller casts and shorter running time to allow them to be rehearsed and performed in a week. In recent years a series of productions have been run in parallel, with a consistent theme (such as Greek myths or plays by Shakespeare). As usual, these plays are almost always written by members of the society, and often heavily lampoon their subject matter. The plays are dedicated to Emma Clements, a CULES member that was lost to cancer in 1996, and performed for a student audience in one of the college gardens of Cambridge.

== Membership ==
All members of CULES are students or former students at the University of Cambridge, or Anglia Ruskin University. It is unique amongst Cambridge drama societies in that it seeks to include students who have an interest in drama (particularly non-serious drama) but may lack the necessary ability or free time to join one of the other drama societies (such as Footlights or the Cambridge University Amateur Dramatic Club). This is done by giving a role to all who audition. It also aims to give students experience with roles such as a writer, director, producer, technician, choreographer or musical director to complement the acting.

Several well-known former members of CULES (see above) went on to successful careers in the entertainment business.

== Edinburgh Fringe ==
In 2003, CULES and OULES created the Two Shades of Blue theatre group to perform at the Edinburgh Fringe festival with their own version of The Three Musketeers. With performances to over three hundred audience members, the show was a success.

A year later, Two Shades of Blue returned to the Fringe with their take on the Dracula story. Performing at the Bedlam Theatre, they improved on their success from the previous year, attaining audience figures well above average for both the venue and the festival as a whole.

In 2005, Two Shades of Blue brought, for the first time, two shows to the Fringe, The Wind in the Willows and The Dalmatian of Faust. Both played to positive reviews. The group returned to the Edinburgh Fringe in 2006 with a Science Fiction spoof, Paradox- Set Phasers to Pun! which smashed previous audience records. 2007 saw sell-out performances of "The Matrix: The Pantomime", and "Comedy and Cake: A teatime revue" at the Edinburgh Fringe.

2008 saw the group return with Back to the Future: The Pantomime and "Comedy and Cake". They also staged Back to the Future: The Pantomime in 2012.

== Charitable aims ==
CULES contributes almost all the revenue from its student productions to charity. In recent years, it has succeeded in raising several hundred pounds a term to support such causes as The Samaritans, cancer support and children's hospices.
