= Fin Taylor =

British stand-up comedian

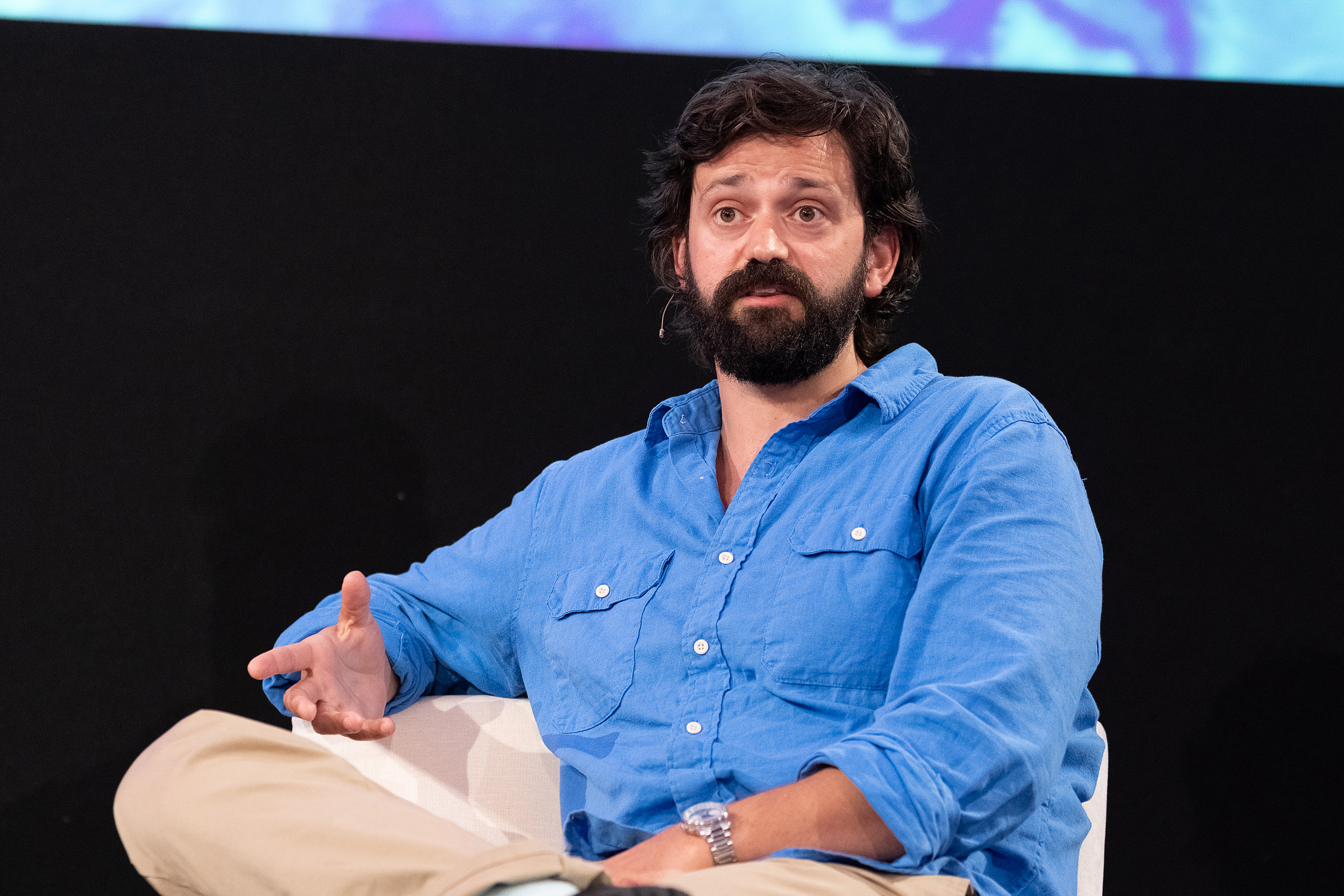
- Fin Taylor at SXSW London 2026
- Born: St Albans, Hertfordshire, England
- Education: Abingdon School; University of Bristol
- Occupation: Comedian
- Years active: 2008–present
- Notable work: Fin vs the Internet; Fin vs History
- Website: fintaylor.com

Fin Taylor is a British stand-up comedian and podcaster.

== Early life ==
Taylor was born in St Albans. His father, Jeremy Taylor, is a filmmaker and former teacher at Abingdon School as well as a member of the jazz vocal harmony group Harvey and the Wallbangers.

Taylor's mother is Scottish, and he lived in Glasgow until the age of seven. Between the ages of eight and 13, Taylor's mother ran a boarding house at a girl's public school in Oxford, where the family lived.

Taylor later attended Abingdon School, an independent boarding school in Oxfordshire, himself, where he first developed an interest in performance and comedy. Following his secondary education, he went on to study at the University of Bristol. While there, he became increasingly involved in the university’s comedy and performing arts scenes.

== Career ==
Taylor began gigging in 2008. In 2010, he was a semi-finalist for the Chortle Student Award. He first took a solo show to the Edinburgh Fringe in 2014. His three shows in successive years, Whitey McWhiteface, Lefty Tighty Righty Loosey, and When Harassy Met Sally, led The Scotsman to call him "one of the most discussed, and critically lauded comedian of recent Edinburgh Fringes". His comedic style is often described as "provocative" and antagonistic, though he has earned praise for his ability to "be both edgy and woke within the same joke."

Taylor had a bit part in the 2018 Tomb Raider reboot, but his scene was cut from the final film.

He has made several appearances on BBC panel show Have I Got News for You, where his provocative comedic style caused controversy following jokes about Jeremy Corbyn and bombing the Glastonbury Festival. In September 2022, he appeared on the American NFL show Good Morning Football. Previously, Taylor was a warm-up act for Never Mind the Buzzcocks, and a opening act for comedian Glenn Wool.

Taylor collaborates with Comedy Crackers each year, producing sell-out Christmas Crackers designed to 'spice up' the Christmas dinner table.

Starting in 2022, Taylor has hosted Fin vs the Internet, a video series written and produced alongside fellow comedians, Horatio Gould and Vittorio Angelone, in which his character tries to understand the Internet by interviewing a different notable online figure in each episode.

=== Fin vs History ===
Since 2025, Taylor and Gould have co-hosted the podcast Fin vs History, which describes itself as "the show for people who like history but don't care what actually happened". In 2026, they won the Chortle Award for Best Podcast. That same year, production company Fumblerooski Productions resigned with distributor Podmasters. As of September 2026, the podcast has surpassed 66 million downloads and is ranked 12th in Spotify’s UK Top Podcasts chart and in the Top 20 on Apple Podcasts.

In 2026, Taylor published The History of Mankind in Its Entirety (Abridged): An Unsupervised PhD.

== Personal life ==
Taylor is married. He and his wife have two children, a daughter and a son, respectively. Taylor has been known to reference his children in his stand-up.

== See also ==
- List of Old Abingdonians
