= Jamie MacDonald (Scottish comedian) =

Scottish stand-up comedian

Jamie MacDonald is a Scottish stand-up comedian from Glasgow. He has written and performed seven critically acclaimed shows at the Edinburgh Festival Fringe.

In 2022 he won the 'Best Presenter' Grierson Award for the BBC Two documentary Blind Ambition. MacDonald has appeared on Live at the Apollo, QI, Celebrity MasterChef and three times on Have I Got News for You. He has written and performed two series of his radio 4 show Life on the Blink.

MacDonald has the degenerative eye condition retinitis pigmentosa (RP), which was diagnosed when he was 16.
