= Blind Ambition (TV programme) =

British TV documentary

Blind Ambition is a 2021 BBC Two documentary about blind creative people, presented by Jamie MacDonald and Jamie O'Leary.

Jamie MacDonald is a blind standup comedian, and at the time of making this documentary Jamie O'Leary had deteriorating vision and the prospect of an operation which might result in him losing his sight. O'Leary has been a television producer for over 20 years, and produced I'm Spazticus for Channel 4 in the run-up to the 2012 Summer Paralympics, with a second series in 2013.

During the programme the two presenters meet a variety of blind creative people including a woodturner, a rapper, and a photographer.

The BBC described it as a "blind-leading-the-nearly-blind mission to uncover and collaborate with the best blind creative talent". The Guardian's reviewer described it as "part travelogue, part documentary, part art project ... a bit of a shambles, at times, but a charming one".

MacDonald and O'Leary were shortlisted for the Grierson Award for Best Documentary Presenters.
