= Paul Tonkinson =

English television and radio personality

- Born: Paul Tonkinson; 1 August 1969 (age 56); Scarborough, England
- Occupations: Stand-up comedian, radio DJ, presenter
- Years active: 1990s–present

Paul Tonkinson (born 1 August 1969) is a British comedian, radio presenter and television personality, best known for his presenting work on The Big Breakfast and The Sunday Show.

He was winner of the 1992 Time Out New Act of the Year Award and was Time Out Stand Up Comic of the Year in 1997.

== Early life ==
Tonkinsom is a former pupil of Scalby School and Northallerton School.

== Career ==
=== Comedy ===
Tonkinson has been a regular on the UK comedy circuit for over twenty years, playing both public gigs and corporate events, and regularly taking shows to the Edinburgh Festival. In 2003 he performed at Balham's Banana Cabaret, alongside Michael McIntyre and Geoff Norcott.

Tonkinson is also regularly booked by the UK Armed Forces, and was the first comic to perform in Iraq after the war officially ended. He has won two Time Out Comedy Awards.

Tonkinson went on tour with McIntyre in 2015, for his Happy & Glorious show, as well as his Jet-Lagged and Jolly tour in 2023.

=== Television ===
Tonkinson's BBC television credits include: Stand Up for the Homeless, The Stand Up Show, The Sunday Show, Comic Relief does Fame Academy, EastEnders Revealed, Liquid News, Good Evening Rockall and Michael McIntyre's Comedy Roadshow.

For Channel 4, Tonkinson has appeared in The Big Breakfast, Take the Mike, Pop Gun, Top Ten and Dicing With Debt. On ITV, Tonkinson's credits include Stand Up, Live at Jongleurs, Raw Soap and Raw Soap II.

On Sky1, Tonkinson has appeared in The Film Show, Lorraine, Spend It Like Beckham. Additional credits include Live from the Comedy Store (Channel 5), MTV Hot (MTV) and Hey DJ (UK Play).

=== Radio ===
Tonkinson's early radio career included The Paul Tonkinson Show on London Live, as well as contributions to various Radio 4 comedy programmes, including Loose Ends and Weekending. He was also featured on Radio 4's Live From the Comedy Store.

He became the inaugural Breakfast Show presenter on Xfm Manchester upon its launch on 15 March 2006, before moving to Xfm London in 2007. There, he initially presented a variety of daytime shows to become familiar to listeners, before taking over the Drivetime slot from Richard Bacon. Following the sudden departure of Lauren Laverne from the Breakfast Show in April 2007, producers called on his experience in Manchester and asked him to step in. This was only a stop-gap solution, however, as he decided to focus on returning to the London stand-up circuit.

Tonkinson has latterly presented the syndicated Saturday lunchtime show, a slot previously occupied by Lauren Laverne, Adam & Joe, and Ricky Gervais/Stephen Merchant, before leaving radio work completely to focus on stand-up comedy.

=== Podcasts ===
As a supporter of Manchester United, Tonkinson co-presented the podcast ManYoo Redcast with fellow fan Eddie Nestor. Tonkinson also participates in the Running Commentary running podcast, with Rob Deering.

=== Writing ===
In January 2020, Tonkinson's first book, 26.2 Miles to Happiness: A Comedian's Tale of Running, Red Wine and Redemption was published by Bloomsbury Sport.

== Awards ==
Awarding Body/Event	Awarded
Jongleurs	2002 Best Comedy Performer
Time Out	1997 Stand Up Comic of the Year; 1992 New Act of the Year Award

Media offices
Preceded by n/a	XFM Manchester Breakfast Presenter; Launch-2007	Succeeded by Jason Manford
Preceded by Richard Bacon	XFM London Drivetime Presenter; 2007	Succeeded by Ian Camfield
Preceded by Lauren Laverne	XFM London Breakfast Presenter; 2007	Succeeded by Alex Zane
Preceded by Lauren Laverne	XFM Saturday Lunchtime Presenter; 2007-2008	Succeeded by Danny Wallace
