= Leo Reich =

English comedian and actor (born 1998)

- Reich in 2026
- Born: Leo Emanuel Reich; 1 August 1998 (age 28); London, England
- Occupations: Comedian; actor; writer

Comedy career
- Years active: 2016–present
- Genres: Observational; black comedy; satire; deadpan; musical comedy
- Subjects: human interaction; sex; marriage; gender differences; self-deprecation; pop culture

Leo Emanuel Reich (born 1 August 1998) is an English comedian, actor and writer.

== Early life and education ==
Reich grew up in Islington, north London, and claims he had the "most liberal upbringing ever." His father is the film producer Allon Reich, (DNA Films) and his mother works in education. As a preteen, he experienced social anxiety, finding it more comfortable to interact with people who were older. Reich attended the private City of London School, where he found it challenging to be queer. He studied at Queens' College, Cambridge. During his time at Cambridge, he performed with the sketch comedy troupe Footlights in 2019. His dissertation was "on the use of recipes in modernist literature."

== Career ==
Reich started doing comedy not because others had always found him funny, "but because [he was] a massive comedy fan." Reich discovered stand-up comedy as a teenager through YouTube. Watching James Acaster perform live, Reich found it "exhilarating" to be the subject of one of the jokes, "to be embarrassed in this kind of public way." He was also inspired by Lena Dunham's show Girls, saying that it offered "a kind of dual, third-person perspective on your own life, whilst living it from a first-person perspective." Another influence was Simon Amstell, particularly for the "young, gay, cripplingly self-conscious Jewish" perspective. Reich also cites as influences Kate Berlant and John Early, as well as Bo Burnham and Jamie Demetriou. He also describes himself as "a big Lorde person."

While still studying at Cambridge, Reich partnered with Emmeline Downie on a two-person show titled Manhunt, which they brought to Edinburgh Fringe. The show is presented as a series of sketches, with Reich and Downie portraying different characters, and has a narrative arc focused on finding romance during a era of dating apps and social media. A review in the university publication Varsity described the show as, "an absolute triumph of character comedy and a true crowd-pleaser."

In 2020, at the start of the COVID-19 pandemic Reich wrote, acted in, and shot part of a series of comedic performances broadcast on Channel 4. He also spent part of the year uploading comedic videos to Twitter. The cancellation of events such as Edinburgh Fringe, and the necessity to perform on Zoom, gave Reich a pause that was useful to honing his performance style.

Reich's one-man show Leo Reich: Literally Who Cares?! debuted at the 2022 Edinburgh Fringe. He performed the show at venues in the United Kingdom as well as New York City. A performance at EartH in Hackney, East London was recorded for distribution on Max. It was picked up by the streaming service when Nina Rosenstein, who worked for HBO, saw the show at the Greenwich House Theatre in New York. The show is a mix of standup comedy and musical theatre, with the music composed by Toby Marlow, with whom Reich was a classmate at Cambridge. Reich described his stage costume as "influencer clown." Reich downplayed the importance of the show's satire, stating, "Not even a single fibre of my being thinks that what I'm doing is important on any level."

The New Yorker reviewed the show, saying it "manages to skewer both the panicked self-absorption of the young while also offering an unsparing survey of the social, political, cultural, technological, environmental, and epidemiological conditions in which they have had the misfortune to come of age." Samantha Allen, writing for them, said the show was, "an irony-laden routine that circuitously and cheekily explores the narcissism, nihilism, and greed of late-stage capitalism, especially as we experience it on social media." For the production, Reich was nominated for Best Newcomer at the 2022 Dave Comedy Awards and the Edinburgh Comedy Awards, as well as Most Outstanding Show at the 2023 Melbourne International Comedy Festival.

In 2023, Reich was named on The Times list of "best new British talent."

Reich played Boss Gibbons in the 2025 Netflix romantic comedy series Too Much.

Announced in February 2025, Channel 4 commissioned the comedy series It Gets Worse, created by and starring Reich.

== Personal life ==
Reich is queer. He came out to his parents while performing onstage at Edinburgh Fringe. He cited watching Alfonso Cuarón's film Y tu mamá también as a "clarifying moment" in identifying his sexuality.

== Television appearances ==
- Friday Night Live (Channel 4)
- Late Night Mash (Dave)
- Comedy Central Live
- Jonathan Ross Comedy Club (ITV)
- Late Night with Seth Meyers (NBC)
- Richard Osman's House of Games (BBC)
- Too Much (Netflix)
- It Gets Worse (Channel 4)

== Stand-up specials ==
Title	Released	Notes
Leo Reich: Literally Who Cares?!	16 December 2023	Recorded at Earth Hackney in East London
