= Reginald D. Hunter =

UK-based American comedian and actor

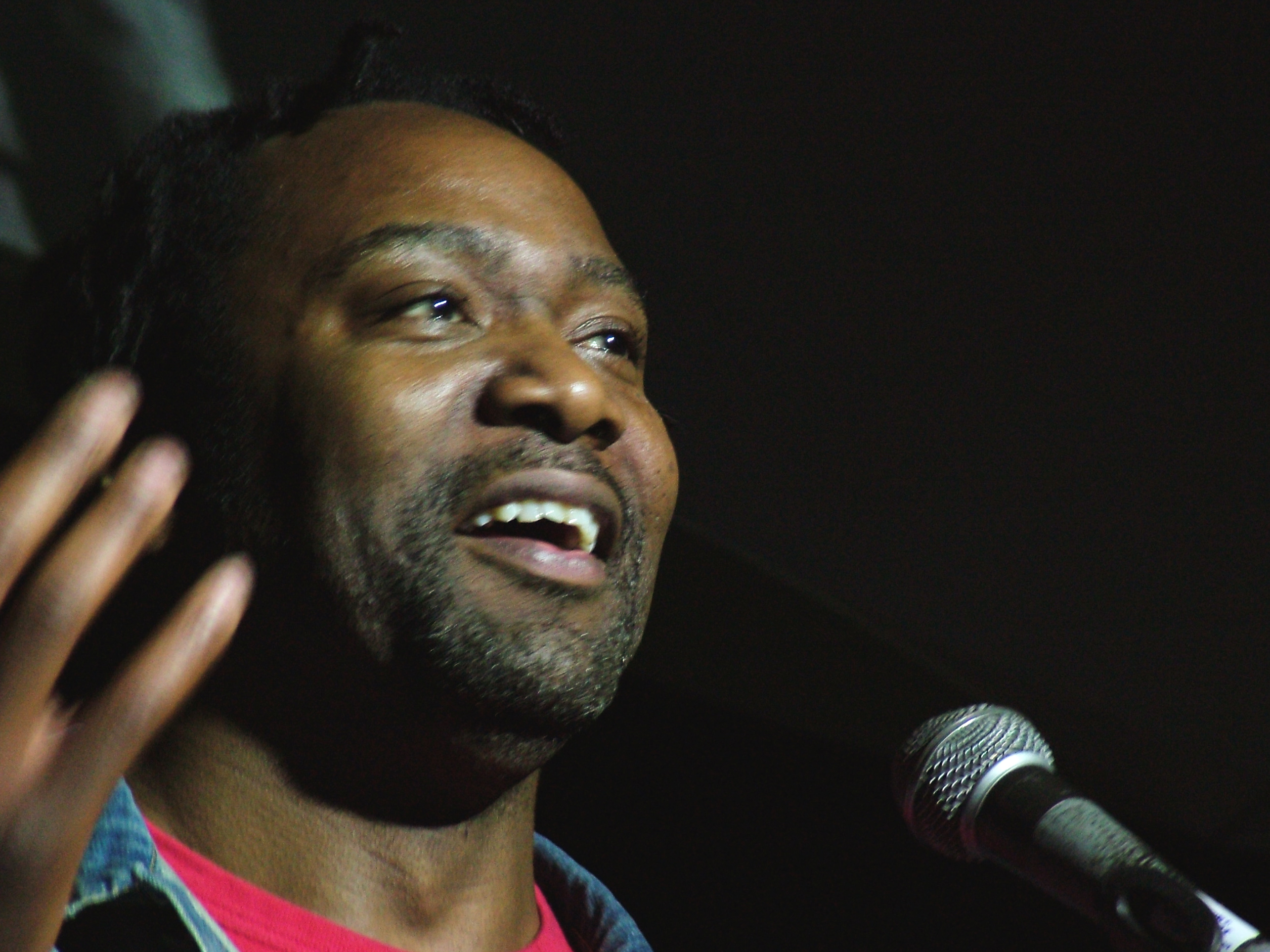
- Hunter in 2006
- Born: Reginald Darnell Hunter; March 26, 1969 (age 57); Albany, Georgia, U.S.

Comedy career
- Years active: 1992–present
- Medium: Stand-up; television
- Genres: Social satire; observational comedy
- Subjects: Society; culture; human interaction; racism
- Website: reginalddhunter.co.uk

Reginald Darnell Hunter (born March 26, 1969) is an American stand-up comedian based in the United Kingdom.

== Early life ==
Reginald Darnell Hunter was born on March 26, 1969, in Albany, Georgia, the youngest of nine.

He undertook an acting internship in Jackson, Mississippi, at age 20.

== Career ==
=== Stand-up ===
Having initially travelled to the UK at the age of 27 as a summer student at the Royal Academy of Dramatic Art, Hunter became a comedian after performing his first comedy set as a dare, for which he received £100. Realising that he enjoyed performing comedy, and that it might be profitable, he turned his attention from acting to stand-up.

In 2006 and 2008, Hunter participated in Project X Presents events. In 2013 he toured Ireland with his show In the Midst of Crackers.

Hunter often uses variations of the term "nigga" in the titles of his shows. In 2006, Reginald D Hunter: Pride & Prejudice... & Niggas attracted some controversy, and the poster was banned from the London Underground. His tour with Steve Hughes, called Trophy Nigga, played 55 venues around the UK, but not all the venues used the tour title. Hunter joked that this was because promoters didn't like the word "trophy".

In April 2013, Hunter performed at an engagement for the Professional Footballers' Association. Following the event, PFA chairman Clarke Carlisle accused Hunter of racism, as he had used the word "nigger" during his set. Carlisle also said that some of those present had found Hunter's material "highly offensive". In response, Hunter posted to his Facebook page many photos of himself taken after his set with people attending the event, with most smiling.

Reviewing Hunter's 2024 stand-up tour in The Standard, Bruce Dessau wrote that Hunter "moves elegantly from big topic to big topic, concisely skewering each subject", describing him as "a truly talented comedian". Writing in the Edinburgh Evening News, Kevin Quinn described Hunter in his most recent performances as "still not for the faint-hearted and easily offended," commenting that "he does seem a lot more reflective in middle-age".

==== Edinburgh Fringe 2024 incident ====
In August 2024, during the Gaza war, Hunter made a joke referencing a Channel 5 documentary about domestic abuse, telling the audience: "When I saw that, I thought, my God, it’s like being married to Israel." During the performance, a British-Israeli couple in the front row objected to the joke, telling Hunter it was "not funny", after which they were booed by fellow audience members, some of whom shouted, "You're not welcome". The couple then left.

After his performance, Hunter referenced a review of one of his shows in The Jewish Chronicle which was behind a paywall, saying, "Typical fucking Jews, they won’t tell you anything unless you subscribe. It's just a joke". Campaign Against Antisemitism (CAA) criticised the joke, and mentioned previous jokes that Hunter had made about the Holocaust. The East Renfrewshire Culture and Leisure organisation said it had cancelled a planned show at the Eastwood Theatre in Giffnock because of "a commitment to our community, and to our values of diversity and inclusion".

Police Scotland concluded that "no crime was established." Hunter commented after the event that he is "staunchly anti-war and anti-bully", saying that "as a comedian, I do push boundaries in creating humour". British comedy news website Chortle later named the couple as Mark Lewis, a lawyer who came to prominence representing the victims of newspaper phone hacking, and Mandy Blumenthal, the national director of Likud-Herut UK. Blumenthal was a founder of, and "leading figure" in the CAA, sitting on its committee, and Lewis is a longstanding patron.

==== Legal proceedings ====
The CAA brought a private prosecution against Hunter alleging three offences under section 127 of the Communications Act 2003, relating to posts he allegedly published on X in September 2024. Hunter failed to appear at the initial hearing at Westminster Magistrates Court on 30 May 2025, and a summons was issued by the court requiring him to attend at a future date.

On 23 December 2025, District Judge Michael Snow overturned the summons and dismissed the case against Hunter. Snow stated that the CAA had misled the court in their application, falsely leading him to believe Hunter's messages were anti-Semitic, and had failed to comply with disclosure obligations, describing the actions of the CAA as "abusive" and an attempt to have Hunter "cancelled". He further stated: "[...] my view of the conduct of the CAA is consistent with them as an organisation which is not “playing it straight” but is seeking to use the criminal justice system, in this case, for improper reasons."

=== Broadcast ===
==== Audio ====
Hunter was one of the hosts of the E4 Laughs at Edinburgh podcast, showcasing the best comedy talent from the 2008 Edinburgh Festival Fringe. He has had numerous appearances on the BBC Radio 4 comedy show The Unbelievable Truth. He also appeared on Midweek (BBC Radio 4) on November 15, 2011.

==== Television ====
Hunter made his TV debut on Channel 4's The 11 O'Clock Show in 1998. He has since appeared many times.

=== Awards ===
Hunter was nominated for the Perrier Award in the 2003 and 2004 Edinburgh Festivals.

He won the Writers' Guild Award for Comedy in 2006 for his show Pride & Prejudice... & Niggas.

== Personal life ==
His mother died in 2004. He has a daughter, born in 2002, of whom he was unaware until she was 15.

== Television credits ==
Hunter's credits include:

1998

- The 11 O'Clock Show (Channel 4)

2004

- Does Doug Know (Channel 4)
- Boozy Britain (Channel 4)
- Comedy Store Stand-up (Channel 5)
- 8 Out of 10 Cats (Channel 4)
- Never Mind the Buzzcocks (BBC Two)
- Have I Got News for You (BBC One)

2007

- News Knight (ITV1)
- 8 Out of 10 Cats (Channel 4)
- Have I Got News for You (BBC One)

2008

- Good News Week (TEN) AUS
- Have I Got News for You (BBC One)
- Spicks and Specks (ABC1) AUS
- Trexx and Flipside (BBC Three)
- Lawro and the Warlocks of Doom (6 Music)

2009

- QI (BBC Four / One / Two)
- Good News Week (TEN) AUS
- Argumental (Dave)
- Have I Got News for You (BBC One)
- 8 Out of 10 Cats (Channel 4)
- You Have Been Watching (Channel 4)
- Spicks and Specks (ABC1) AUS
- Would I Lie to You? (BBC One)
- It's Only a Theory (BBC Four)
- Live at the Apollo (BBC One)

2010

- The Bubble (BBC Two)
- Spicks and Specks (ABC1) AUS
- Friday Night with Jonathan Ross (BBC One)
- You Have Been Watching (Channel 4)
- Have I Got News for You (BBC One)
- The Green Room with Paul Provenza (Showtime)

2011

- Stand and Deliver (RTÉ 2) IRL
- Have I Got News for You (BBC One)
- This Week (BBC One - UK politics show)
- Something for the Weekend (BBC Two)
- The Hour (STV)
- Dave's One Night Stand (Dave)

2012

- The Graham Norton Show (BBC One)
- Have I Got News for You (BBC One)
- Channel 4's Comedy Gala (Channel 4)
- 8 Out of 10 Cats (Channel 4)
- QI (BBC One)

2013

- Have I Got News for You (BBC One)
- Was It Something I Said? (Channel 4)

2014

- Have I Got News for You (BBC One)
- QI (BBC Four / One / Two)

2015

- Reginald D Hunter's Songs of the South (BBC One)
- 8 Out of 10 Cats Does Countdown (Channel 4)

2016

- Acting role in Man Down - 1 episode

2018

- Reginald D Hunter's Songs of the Border (BBC Two)
- Have I Got News for You (BBC One)

2020

- Have I Got News for You (BBC One)

2021

- Richard Osman's House of Games (BBC One)
