= Helen Serafinowicz =

English producer and comedy writer (born 1974)

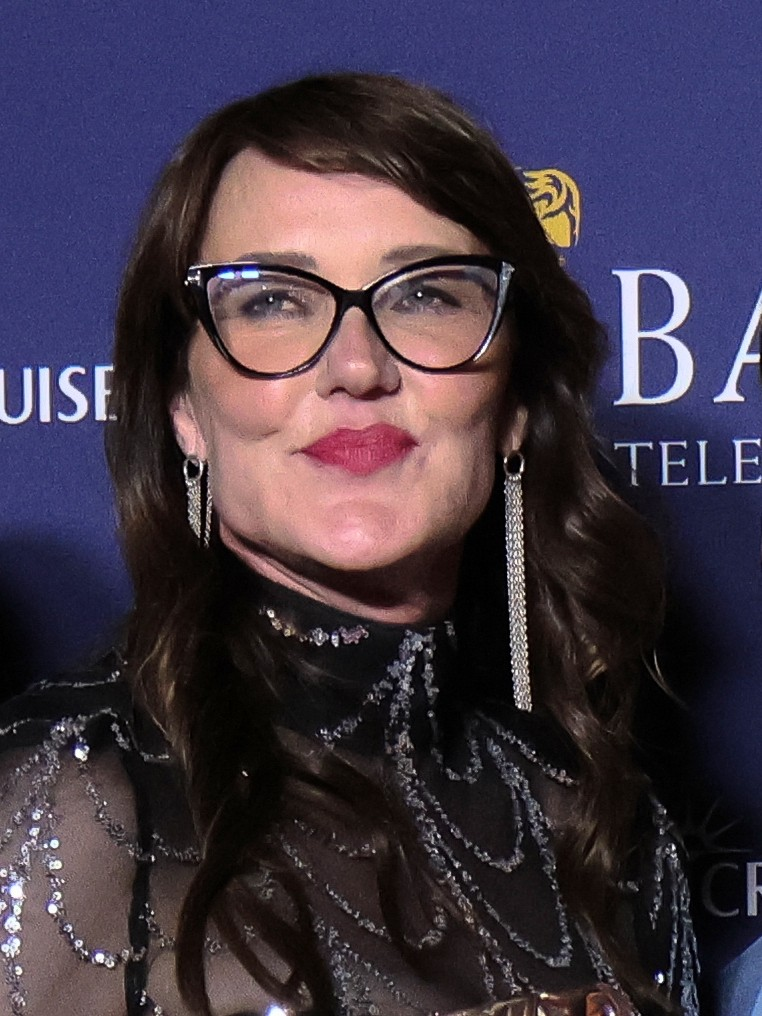
- Serafinowicz in 2026
- Born: Liverpool, England
- Known for: Nova Jones, Motherland, Amandaland
- Spouse: Graham Linehan (m. 2004; div. 2020)
- Children: 2
- Relatives: Peter Serafinowicz (brother)

Helen Serafinowicz is an English writer and television producer.

== Career ==
Serafinowicz started out as a producer on Cartoon Network.

Serafinowicz created and co-wrote the musical science-fiction television series Nova Jones, about an 18-year-old popstar on a concert tour throughout the galaxy. The show ran for three series and aired on CBBC.

From 2016 to 2022, Serafinowicz was part of the writing team of the BBC comedy series Motherland, with Graham Linehan, Sharon Horgan, Holly Walsh and Barunka O'Shaughnessy. In 2022, the team won a Bafta for Best Scripted Comedy for the third series of the show.

Serafinowicz previously ran an interior decor shop named Stubenhocker in Norwich. She closed the shop in 2020 to focus on her writing.

In 2024, the BBC commissioned Amandaland, a spin-off series from series Motherland. Co-created and co-written by Serafinowicz, Amandaland, the show follows character Amanda who moves to a new community following her divorce.

In 2025, Serafinowicz wrote The Legend of Rooney's Ring, a musical comedy about professional football player Wayne Rooney and his wife Coleen Rooney.

== Personal life ==
Serafinowicz was born in Liverpool, and is the sister of actor and comedian Peter Serafinowicz. She is the former wife of comedy writer and anti-transgender activist Graham Linehan. She has two children.
