= Alyssa McClelland =

Australian actress

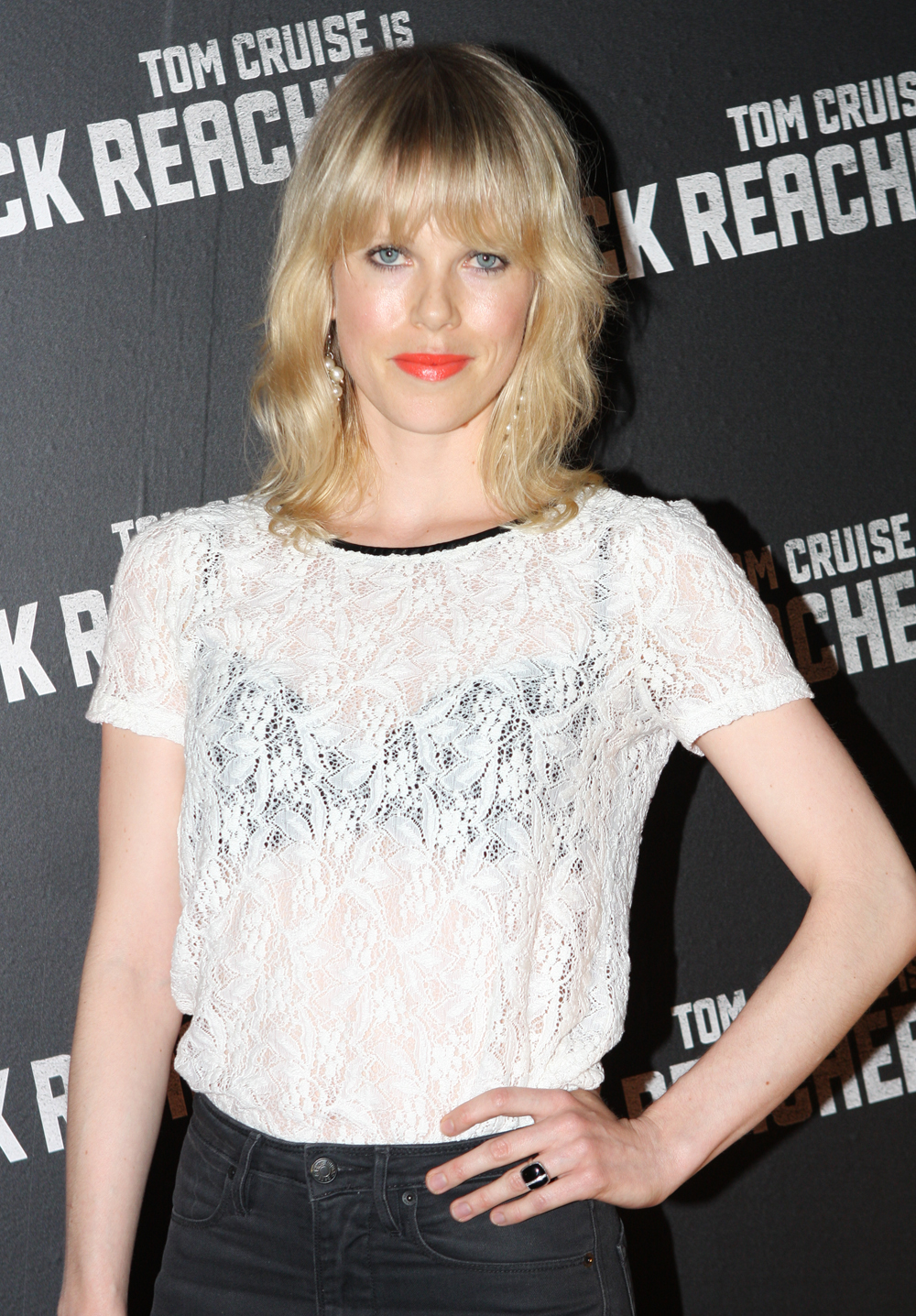
- McClelland in December 2012
- Born: 1981 (age 44–45); Sydney, Australia
- Education: Newtown High School of the Performing Arts; Australian Theatre for Young People; University of Technology Sydney; Atlantic Theater Company, New York
- Occupations: Director, writer, actress
- Years active: 2000–present
- Known for: Second Best (director), Amandaland (BBC), Sex Education (Netflix), Everything Now (Netflix)

Alyssa McClelland is a director, screenwriter, producer and former actress, known for directing the series Amandaland, the finale episodes of Sex Education and the award-winning short Second Best.

== Early life and education ==
McClelland is the daughter of an industrial chemist father and office manager mother. McClelland was educated at Newtown High School of the Performing Arts in Sydney and was Dux in her final year. She attended the University of Technology Sydney where she earned a Bachelor of Arts in Communication in Media Arts and Production, majoring in film.

From the age of fifteen, McClelland trained and performed in productions with the Australian Theatre for Young People in Sydney, until she received a scholarship that enabled her to study abroad with the Atlantic Theater Company in New York.

== Career ==
=== Director / producer / writer ===
After founding production company ‘Pickled Films’ in 2009, McClelland’s first short film, the romantic comedy Emilia Eckle, was shown at 10 film festivals worldwide, including opening night at the Palm Springs Film Festival. The following year, she directed, wrote and produced the short film Nic and Shauna, starring Ryan Johnson and Pia Miranda, which was selected to be a finalist at Tropfest. From 2011, McClelland directed the two seasons of Funny or Die's cult web series One Step Closer to Home, which she also wrote, produced and starred in together with Ryan Johnson.

In 2012, Alyssa was the recipient of the InStyle Magazine Woman of Style Scholarship for her work as a filmmaker. Around this time, she served on the jury for FlickerUp, the kids’ section of Flickerfest.

McClelland's 2018 short, Second Best won numerous awards, including the Dendy Live Action Short Award at the Sydney Film Festival, Best Short Film at the Milano Film Festival, Foreign Film at LakeShorts International Short Film Festival in Toronto, Best Direction at Flickerfest, Best Direction in a Short Film at the Australian Directors' Guild Awards and the Youth Award at 20MinMax Film Festival in Germany.

In 2021, McClelland directed several episodes of season 34 of long-running soap opera Home and Away, in which she had previously guested as an actor.

McClelland directed the finale episodes of Emmy Award-winning British Netflix teen sex comedy series Sex Education in 2022. That same year, she was the set-up director of British teen comedy-drama Everything Now (originally titled The Fuck It Bucket), also with Netflix, starring Stephen Fry and Sophie Wilde. In 2025, she directed the successful BBC comedy series Amandaland, a spin-off of the sitcom Motherland.

Together with Mia Wasikowska, McClelland directed the upcoming miniseries The Great White, starring Hugo Weaving. She was also set-up director and executive producer on the upcoming Netflix drama miniseries My Brilliant Career, an adaptation of Miles Franklin's 1901 classic Australian novel of the same name. The critically-acclaimed 1979 film adaptation of the novel launched the careers of Judy Davis and Sam Neill.

McClelland is also a respected international commercial director, having directed campaigns for Google Pixel, Apple, Air New Zealand, Samsung, Netflix and Vodafone, AEG, McDonald’s and Pot Noodle. Her advertising work has won awards such as the Black Pencil at the D&AD Awards and Best Direction at the London International Awards.

=== Actor ===
Prior to her career behind the camera, McClelland had roles in Australian film, television and theatre. She appeared in the feature films A Man's Gotta Do (2004), Deck Dogz (2005) and The Bet (2006) and even had a role in 2002 American horror film Queen of the Damned, opposite Aaliyah. She also featured in short films that screened at Tropfest. Her television credits include Rake, Dance Academy, Canal Road and four separate guest roles in Home and Away.

McClelland received an Australian Film Institute Award nomination for Best Guest or Supporting Actress in Television, for her 2005 role in the Network Ten telemovie Small Claims: White Wedding.

McClelland has performed leading roles in productions with the Sydney Theatre Company, Melbourne Theatre Company, and Belvoir St Theatre in Sydney.

McClelland was the face of Jan Logan Jewellery in 2005.

== Director / producer / writer credits ==
=== Film ===
Year	Title	Role	Type	Ref.
2009	Emilia Eckle	Director / writer	Short film	
2010	Nic and Shauna	Director / writer / producer	Short film	
2011	The Bride	Co-producer	Short film	
2011	Home	Producer	Short film	
2018	Second Best	Director / writer / producer	Short film	

=== Television ===
Year	Title	Role	Type	Ref.
2011–2015	One Step Closer to Home	Director / co-writer / co-producer	TV web series, seasons 1–2, 19 episodes	
2021	Home and Away	Director	5 episodes	
2022	Everything Now (aka The Fuck-It Bucket)	Director	2 episodes	
2022	Sex Education	Final block director	Season 4, 3 episodes	
2023	Class of '07	Splinter unit director	7 episodes	
2025	Amandaland	Lead director	Motherland spin-off, 6 episodes	
2026	My Brilliant Career	Set-up director / executive producer	Miniseries	
2027	The Great White	Co-director	Miniseries	

== Awards ==
Year	Nominated work	Award	Category	Result	Ref.
2005	Small Claims: White Wedding	Australian Film Institute Award	Best Guest or Supporting Actress in Television	Nominated	
2010	Emilia Eckle	Reel Shorts Film Festival, Canada	Best Short Film	Top 5	
2010	Nic and Shauna	Tropfest	Best Short Film	Finalist	
2012	One Step Closer to Home	LA WebFest	Best Actress	Won	
2012	Alyssa McClelland	InStyle Magazine	Woman of Style Scholarship	Won	
2014	The Duchenne Foundation – Awareness for Muscular Dystrophy TVC	D&AD Awards	Black Pencil Award	Won	
2014	AEG – Unexpected Power TVC	London International Awards	Best Direction	Won	
2018	Mainland – New Tricks TVC	Australian Directors' Guild Awards	Best Direction of Commercial Content	Nominated	
2018	Second Best	20MinMax Film Festival	Youth Jury Award	Won	
2018	Second Best	Flickerfest	Best Direction	Won	
2018	Second Best	Lakeshorts International Film Festival	Best Foreign Film	Won	
2018	Second Best	Maryland International Film Festival	Best Short Film	Nominated	
2018	Second Best	Milano Film Festival (MIFF Awards)	Best International Short Film (15–30 minutes)	Won	
2018	Second Best	Sydney Film Festival	Dendy Live Action Short	Won	
2019	Second Best	Australian Directors' Guild Awards	Best Direction in a Short Film	Won	
