= Cinderella (2000 film) =

2000 UK film

- Based on: various versions of Cinderella
- Written by: Nick Dear
- Directed by: Beeban Kidron
- Starring: Marcella Plunkett; Kathleen Turner; Gideon Turner; Jane Birkin; David Warner; Leslie Philips; Lucy Punch; Katrin Cartlidge; Sharon Maughan; Nickolas Grace; Jenny Tomasin
- Theme music composer: Youth; Jaz Coleman
- Country of origin: United Kingdom
- Original language: English

Production
- Producers: Trevor Eve; Simon Johnson
- Cinematography: Aleksei Rodionov
- Editor: Colin Monie
- Running time: 90 minutes
- Production company: Projector Pictures
- Budget: £2 million

Original release
- Network: Channel 4
- Release: 1 January 2000

Cinderella is a television film released on 1 January 2000, in the United Kingdom, directed by Beeban Kidron. The cast is led by Kathleen Turner, who plays the Wicked Stepmother Claudette. The film follows the original idea of the fairytale classic but is based in a modern world full of fashion and technology.

== Plot ==
In this version of Cinderella, the heroine is called Zezolla (Marcella Plunkett) and still grieves the loss of her mother; where as her father (David Warner) is more interested in pleasing his new harpy of a wife, Claudette (Kathleen Turner) and her shallow daughters, Gonril and Regan (Katrin Cartlidge and Lucy Punch). Zezolla is treated cruelly and made to work as a servant, while Claudette slowly poisons her father after she discovers that he isn't rich. Zezolla's only friends are the elderly butler Felim (Leslie Philips) and Mab (Jane Birkin) the mermaid like lady who lives behind a waterfall. Meanwhile, the Queen of the land is frustrated with her ‘lazy’ son, Prince Valiant who won't pick a wife, he's not interested in love, love isn't cool, he only likes cool things, until he sees Zezolla. Cinderella does go to the ball but her intent is to sabotage Claudette's plans to find a new husband. While dancing older men away from her evil stepmother, the Prince falls in love with her at first sight. The two would be lovers share a precious few moments together before she has to jump back into a pool she fell out of as the clock strikes midnight.

== Cast ==
- Marcella Plunkett as Cinderella (Zezolla)
- Kathleen Turner as Claudette
- Gideon Turner as Prince Valiant
- Katrin Cartlidge as Goneril
- David Warner as Martin
- Jane Birkin as Mab
- Lucy Punch as Regan
- Leslie Phillips as Felim
- Sharon Maughan as Queen Seraphina
- Grant Ibbs as Warner
- Hosh Kane as Marco (as Hosh Ibrahim)
- Nickolas Grace as First Minister
- Jenny Tomasin as Cook
- Tamara Wall as Dancer

== Reception ==
In 2000, Cinderella was one of Channel Four International's top selling programmes of the year. The film has received positive reviews. Television critic Kevin McDonough described the film as "a smashing new adaptation of Cinderella," in which he praised Kathleen Turner's performance as "wickedly good" and concluded, "Cinderella features stunning cinematography, fabulous costumes, and the best role for Ms. Turner in years." Julie Salamon of The New York Times described the film as an "amusing, overheated pop version of the fairy tale" that "combines the romantic overtones of gothic thrillers...with fanciful music-video imagery. The evil stepmother (Kathleen Turner) wears fabulous neon clothes with exaggerated shapes..." Salamon also said, "This film has many virtues." Authors Elizabeth Ford and Deborah Mitchell of The Makeover in Movies called the film "visually exciting" and that "natural images dominate the tale...The expressionistic use of fantastic color, light and plenty of watery distortion create a magical mood. Its setting suggests a cross between Finland and Disney-world". Mike Davies of Birmingham Post called the film "ambitious" and stated, "Best of all, though, was the re-emergence of Kathleen Turner, chewing the scenery as gold-digging Claudette..." USA Today described Cinderella as "a true pleasure that's filmed with visual style and verbal wit."

== Releases ==
Cinderella has been released on several formats. In 2000, Cinderella was released in the UK on videocassette by 4Learning. 4Learning's video comprised the film in three parts, followed by a documentary The Many Cinderellas, in a total of four 30 minute programmes. The film on videocassette was viewed in schools for educational purposes and activities. In 2002, Educational Media Australia also released the film on videocassette. In 2005, Cinderella was officially released in Taiwan on VCD and DVD by Gull Multimedia International. The DVD had audio in English with removable Chinese subtitles and was packaged with an accompanying booklet in Chinese. In 2006, the film was released in Japan on VHS and DVD as rental only and retail versions under the translated Japanese title シンデレラ by Transformer, and in Australia on DVD by educational resources distributor VEA Group (including Classroom Video). In 2018, the film was released in the United Kingdom on DVD by Simply Media as well as in the United States and U.S. territories as a streaming online video by Amazon Prime, Roku and Tubi, and later Plex in 2020 and VA Media's YouTube brand channel Movie Central in 2021.
