= The Life and Deaths of Christopher Lee =

2024 documentary film

- Film poster
- Directed by: Jon Spira
- Written by: Jon Spira
- Produced by: Adam F. Goldberg; Hank Starrs
- Narrated by: Peter Serafinowicz
- Cinematography: Simon Vickery
- Edited by: Alex Barrett
- Music by: Jamie Hyatt
- Release date: 25 August 2024 (FrightFest)
- Running time: 99 minutes
- Country: United Kingdom
- Language: English

The Life and Deaths of Christopher Lee is a 2024 British documentary film about the English actor and singer Sir Christopher Lee. It is written and directed by Jon Spira. Lee is portrayed by a string puppet who tells the viewer about his life. The puppet is voiced by Peter Serafinowicz. The film premiered at FrightFest in August 2024.

== Cast ==
- Christopher Lee (archive footage)
- Harriet Walter
- Juan Aneiros
- Jonathan Rigby
- John Landis
- Joe Dante
- Caroline Munro
- Paul Maslansky
- Peter Jackson
- Peter Serafinowicz

== Production ==
In 2024, a Kickstarter campaign was launched to help fund the film with a goal of £40,000. It was successful.

== Reception ==
Anton Bitel of SciFiNow gave the film four out of five stars and wrote, "While Spira deploys an abundance of archival footage – interviews with the actual Lee and clips from his many, varied films – he also fleshes out his otherworldly narrator with marionettes and beautifully abstract animated inserts." Joel Harley of GamesRadar+ also gave the film four out of five stars, writing that "Christopher Lee is lovingly profiled in this biographical doc." Spencer Perry of ComicBook.com wrote, "Even viewers that enter The Life and Deaths of Christopher Lee knowing him from only a handful of roles will come away from this with a complete picture of who Christopher Lee was and how he continues to define elements of entertainment after his death."
