= Ekow Quartey =

British actor (born 1990)

Ekow Quartey (born 12 July 1990) is a British actor best known for his role as Bem in the Harry Potter films

== Career ==
Quartey attended Dulwich College and has appeared in productions like Harry Potter, Amandaland and This Way Up. He more recently has starred at the National Theatre at Shakespeare’s Globe. In 2024 he played in Much Ado About Nothing.

== Acting credits ==
| Year | Title | Role | Notes |
|---|---|---|---|
| 2004 | Harry Potter and the Prisoner of Azkaban | Bem | |
| 2007 | Harry Potter and the Order of the Phoenix | Bem; Dumbledore's Army Member | |
| 2014 | 50 Kisses | Man | |
| 2016 | National Theatre Live: As You Like It | Forest Lord, William | |
| 2016 | The Complete Walk: Titus Andronicus | Lucius | Short film |
| 2016 | Survivors | Dylan (voice) | Podcast Series |
| 2017 | A Proposal | Victor | |
| 2017 | National Theatre Live: Peter Pan | Nana, Tootles | |
| 2017 | The Current War | Reporter | |
| 2017 | Porters | Billy Tarsal | |
| 2017 | Zapped | Julian | |
| 2018 | Wasteland | Young Doctor | |
| 2019 | Call the Midwife | Joel Aidoo | |
| 2019 | A Serial Killer's Guide to Life | Laughter Therapy Member | |
| 2020 | Shakespeare's Globe: Macbeth | Macbeth | |
| 2019–2021 | This Way Up | James | |
| 2021 | Nakato | Elijah | Short film |
| 2022 | Shakespeare & Hathaway: Private Investigators | 'Slim' Jim Sandford | |
| 2022 | The Marvellous Prospero | Prospero | Short film |
| 2022 | Becoming Elizabeth | Pedro | |
| 2022 | Trying | Steve | |
| 2023 | Breeders | Dr. James | |
| 2023 | Smothered | Mark | |
| 2024 | Blue | Sean | Short film |
| 2025 | Amandaland | JJ | |
| 2026 | Celebrity Mastermind | Himself | |
| TBA | Ibelin | TBA | Filming |
