= Frank of Ireland =

Irish comedy television series

- Genre: Comedy
- Created by: Brian Gleeson; Domhnall Gleeson; Michael Moloney
- Starring: Brian Gleeson; Domhnall Gleeson; Pom Boyd; Sarah Greene
- Country of origin: Ireland
- Original language: English
- No. of series: 1
- No. of episodes: 6

Production
- Executive producers: Sharon Horgan; Clelia Mountford
- Production locations: Belfast; Dublin
- Cinematography: James Mather
- Running time: 23–25 minutes
- Production companies: Merman; Amazon Studios

Original release
- Network: Channel 4 (UK); Amazon Prime Video (USA)
- Release: 16 April 2021

Frank of Ireland is an Irish comedy television series created by brothers Brian Gleeson and Domhnall Gleeson, and Michael Moloney. It premiered in the United Kingdom on Channel 4 on 15 April 2021 and Australia, Canada and the United States on Amazon Prime Video on 16 April 2021.

== Premise ==
Frank Marron is a thirty-something unemployed man-child living with his mother, Mary. Frank continues to keep his hopes alive for a singer/songwriter career, but he excels only at manipulatively ruining things for his improbably loyal best friend, Doofus, and dragging down his on-again-off-again girlfriend, Áine. The show is set in a suburb of Dublin, Ireland.

== Cast and characters ==
- Brian Gleeson as Frank
- Domhnall Gleeson as Doofus
- Pom Boyd as Mary
- Sarah Greene as Áine

== Episodes ==
No.	Title	Directed by	Written by	Original release date	U.K. viewers (millions)
1	"You Talkin' to Meath?"	MJ Delaney	Domhnall Gleeson, Brian Gleeson & Michael Moloney	15 April 2021	N/A
2	"We Need to Talk about Kevin Costner"	MJ Delaney	Domhnall Gleeson, Brian Gleeson & Michael Moloney	15 April 2021	N/A
3	"James Caan't"	MJ Delaney	Domhnall Gleeson, Brian Gleeson & Michael Moloney	15 April 2021	N/A
4	"A Good Few Angry Women"	MJ Delaney	Domhnall Gleeson, Brian Gleeson & Michael Moloney	15 April 2021	N/A
5	"Guitar Nero"	MJ Delaney	Domhnall Gleeson, Brian Gleeson & Michael Moloney	15 April 2021	N/A
6	"Memento Mary"	MJ Delaney	Domhnall Gleeson, Brian Gleeson & Michael Moloney	15 April 2021	N/A
