= Nova Jones =

2021 television series

- Genre: Drama; Science fiction; Musical
- Created by: Helen Serafinowicz
- Starring: Molly Rainford; Grace Barkley; David Byrne; John Lynn; Katie Davies; Faye Stedman Shannon
- Country of origin: United Kingdom
- Original language: English
- No. of series: 3
- No. of episodes: 30

Production
- Executive producers: John Rice; Helen Serafinowicz; Alan Shannon
- Producers: Caoimhe Cassidy; Shauna Cullen
- Running time: 25 minutes
- Production companies: JAM Media; BBC Children's Productions

Original release
- Network: CBBC
- Release: 22 September 2021 – present

Nova Jones is a British musical science-fiction television series which airs on CBBC, created by Helen Serafinowicz. It focuses on the adventures of the titular galactic pop singer in the year 9009, portrayed by Molly Rainford. It began broadcast on 22 September 2021. It has since been renewed for a second and third series.

== Cast ==
- Molly Rainford as Nova Jones
- Grace Barkley as McLaren Jones
- David Byrne as Sid
- John Lynn as Captain of the North
- Luke Coughlan as Johnarchy
- Katie Davies as Jefferson Ship (Voice)
- Faye Stedman Shannon as Chef Din Dins (Jingle Voice)

== Episodes ==
=== Series 1 ===
No. overall	Episode	Directed by	Written by	Original release date
1	"Friends of Nova"	Akaash Meeda	Andrew Ellard	22 September 2021
2	"Nova Gets the Feels"	Fergal Costello	Andrew Ellard & Helen Serafinowicz	29 September 2021
3	"Tantrum by Nova"	Akaash Meeda	Esther Bishop	6 October 2021
4	"Green-Eyed Nova"	Fergal Costello	Andrew Ellard & Helen Serafinowicz	13 October 2021
5	"Nova Has Talent"	Fergal Costello	Alex Collier	20 October 2021
6	"Nova vs. The Space Haters"	Fergal Costello	Julia Kent	27 October 2021
7	"Nova's Embarassinging"	Akaash Meeda	Alex Collier	3 November 2021
8	"Nova's Time Off"	Akaash Meeda	Andrew Ellard	10 October 2021
9	"Triple Threat Nova"	Fergal Costello	Andrew Ellard; Story by: Andrew Ellard & Helen Serafinowicz	17 November 2021
10	"Nova Remembers Everything"	Fergal Costello	Andrew Ellard	24 November 2021

=== Series 2 ===
No. overall	Episode	Directed by	Written by	Original release date
1	"Stop Listening to Nova"	Declan Recks	Julia Kent	28 October 2022
2	"Nova X Clothes Horse"	Declan Recks	Shane Langan & Amy Stephenson	TBA
3	"SuperNovaCon"	Declan Recks	Julia Kent	TBA
4	"Nova's Sistory Lesson"	Declan Recks	Andrew Ellard	TBA
5	"Nil Points Nova"	Declan Recks	Alex Collier	TBA
6	"Nova's Biggest Dance"	Fergal Costello	Andrew Ellard	TBA
7	"No Nova Club"	Fergal Costello	Jeffrey Aidoo	TBA
8	"Nova's Imploding Star"	Fergal Costello	Mariama Ives-Moiba	TBA
9	"Nova's Colouring Out"	Unknown	Andrew Ellard	3 March 2023
10	"Nova 2.0"	TBA	Andrew Ellard	TBA
