= Bad Sugar =

- Genre: Comedy-drama
- Created by: Olivia Colman; Julia Davis; Sharon Horgan
- Written by: Sam Bain; Jesse Armstrong; Olivia Colman; Julia Davis; Sharon Horgan
- Directed by: Ben Palmer
- Starring: Olivia Colman; Julia Davis; Sharon Horgan; Christian Massa; Peter Serafinowicz; Kayvan Novak; David Bradley; Reece Shearsmith
- Country of origin: United Kingdom
- Original language: English

Production
- Running time: 36 minutes
- Production company: Tiger Aspect Productions

Original release
- Network: Channel 4
- Release: 26 August 2012

Bad Sugar is a British comedy pilot, written by Sam Bain and Jesse Armstrong, based on an idea by the show's stars Olivia Colman, Julia Davis and Sharon Horgan.

The programme centres on a wealthy, dysfunctional British mining dynasty, and is a parody of telenovela-style melodramas and soap operas such as Dallas.

It was shown on Channel 4 on 26 August 2012. A full series was commissioned for broadcast in 2013 but cancelled before production with problems co-ordinating the main actors' schedules cited as the reason.

== Plot ==
The pilot episode centres on a dysfunctional, wealthy mining dynasty family – The Caudwells – headed by ailing patriarch, Ralphfred (David Bradley).

Gold-digger Lucy (Sharon Horgan) has just married Ralphfred's son Rolph (Peter Serafinowicz), expecting that his father was on his deathbed. Rolph is clearly more sexually interested in his valet, Lipton. Scheming eldest daughter Daphne (Julia Davis), with a history of mental illness, is married to embittered and wheelchair-bound (from a mining accident) husband, Greg (Reece Shearsmith). Youngest sister Joan (Olivia Colman) is childlike and simple, despite having been said to have killed her twin brother with some bad sugar aged seven.

In attempt to get more information about Ralphfred will, Daphne and Lucy seduce the priest, Rodrigo. They learn that Ralphfred has left everything to his nurse Maria. To get rid of Maria, Daphne seduces hunky but dim gardener Simon (Kayvan Novak) and bribe him to tell Ralphfred he has had sex with Maria and poison their relationship, getting himself and Maria sacked.

Meanwhile, Lucy tries to convince Joan to start playing the piano again, but Daphne is not happy about it. Daphne tricks her into catching a burning hot boule ball and blames Lucy.

In light of everything that happens, Ralphfred announces that he will leave everything to Imperial College London so he can be frozen, in the home of being reanimated. Lucy then reveals a portrait of Daphne from when she was in a mental hospital.

== Cast ==
- Olivia Colman as Joan Cauldwell
- Julia Davis as Daphne Cauldwell
- Sharon Horgan as Lucy Cauldwell
- Peter Serafinowicz as Rolph Cauldwell
- Reece Shearsmith as Greg
- David Bradley as Ralphfred Cauldwell
- Kayvan Novak as Simon
- Derek Riddell as Rodrigo
- Jonjo O'Neill as Lipton
- Trixiebelle Harrowell as Pilot
- Julia Deakin as Dilys (Lucy's mother)

== History ==
The pilot was announced in 2011. This was aired on Channel 4 on 26 August 2012, as part of the channel's 'Funny Fortnight' season. After the success of the pilot, a series was commissioned for Channel 4, to be aired in 2013. However, due to cast scheduling issues, the show was dropped.

In 2016, it was announced that the Bad Sugar series would be made by Fox. The contract includes a "significant penalty" clause, which meant that if they did not make the series, they would have to pay a large sum of money to the producers. Patty Been was signed by fox to create the new script and be the executive producer.

== Reception ==
Whilst the pilot received enough positive reception to be commissioned for a series, some commentators gave negative reviews. The Independent, criticising the format of the show, said that "without any decent material to play with, a blue chip cast...mugged away exhaustingly."
