= Philippa Dunne =

Irish actress

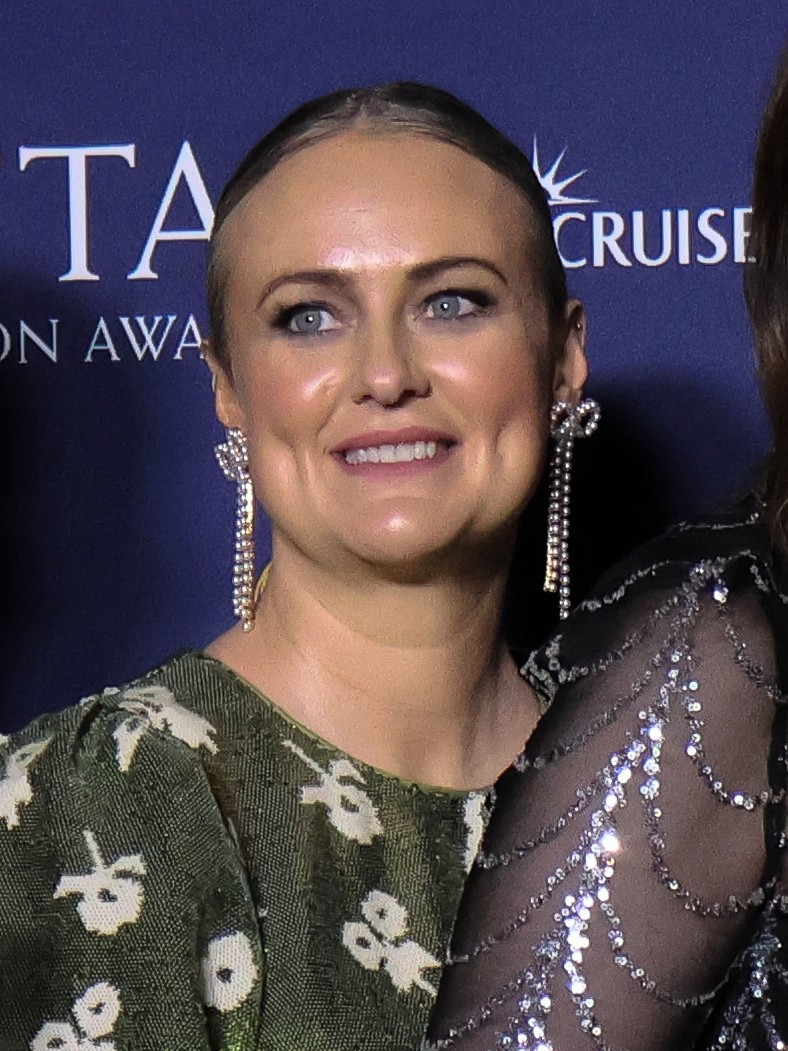
- Dunne in 2026
- Born: County Dublin, Ireland
- Occupations: Actress; writer
- Years active: 2009–present
- Television: The Walshes; Motherland; Derry Girls; This Is Going to Hurt; Amandaland

Philippa Dunne is an Irish actress and writer. She is known for co-writing and starring in the RTÉ comedy The Walshes, as well as her roles as Anne Flynn in Motherland and its spin-off Amandaland, Geraldine Devlin in Derry Girls and Ria in This Is Going to Hurt.

== Life and career ==
Dunne was born in County Dublin and raised in County Mayo, Ireland. She trained at the Gaiety School of Acting before beginning her professional career in 2009. She made her acting and writing debut in the television film Dublin Stories and appeared in two episodes of Rental Boys. In 2010, she co-wrote and appeared in The Taste of Home. In 2014, she wrote and starred in the RTÉ One comedy The Walshes as Carmel Walsh.

Since 2016, Dunne has portrayed Anne Flynn in the BBC Two comedy Motherland, appearing in all 19 episodes. In 2019, she began appearing in the Channel 4 sitcom Derry Girls as Geraldine Devlin, the mother of established character Clare Devlin. Dunne appeared in the series on a recurring basis until its end in May 2022. Dunne was then cast in the BBC One medical comedy-drama series This Is Going to Hurt as Ria, the receptionist. The series began airing on 8 February 2022. She also appeared as a contestant on Celebrity Mastermind, with her specialist subject being the 1980 Stanley Kubrick film The Shining.

For her performance in Amandaland, Dunne received a nomination for the British Academy Television Award for Best Female Comedy Performance in 2026. Her co-stars Lucy Punch and Jennifer Saunders also received nominations.

Dunne is married; she and her husband have one child, born in late 2020. Dunne's infant child appeared in the third series of Motherland as Niamh, the daughter of Dunne's character.

== Filmography ==
Year	Title	Role	Notes
2009	Dublin Stories	Orflaith	Television film; also writer
2009	Rental Boys	Kato/Princess Nagsrec	2 episodes
2010	The Taste of Home	Carmel	Also writer
2014	The Walshes	Carmel Walsh	Main role; also writer
2014	Glue	Nurse Petra	1 episode
2016	Sky Comedy Shorts: Quints	Lenore Kavanagh	Television film; also writer
2016–2022	Motherland	Anne Flynn	Main role
2017	The School	Eunice Lordan	3 episodes
2018	Sky Comedy Shorts	Susan	Episode: "Kris Marshall's Whodunnit"
2019–2022	Derry Girls	Geraldine Devlin	Recurring role; 7 episodes
2020	The Bright Side	A&E receptionist	Film
2021	The Nevers	Mrs. Haplisch	Episode: "Money"
2022	This Is Going to Hurt	Ria	Main role
2022	Celebrity Mastermind	Herself	Contestant
2022	Shelf Life	Dorothy	Short film
2023	The Woman in the Wall	Niamh	Recurring role
2023	Bodies	Lorna Dunnet	Recurring role
2024	Inside No. 9	Elena	Series 9 episode 1: "Boo to a Goose"
2024	The Completely Made-Up Adventures of Dick Turpin	Slake	Series 1 Episode 2: "The Unrobbable Coach"
2025	Amandaland	Anne Flynn	Main Role
2025	How Are You? It's Alan (Partridge)	Leona Maguire	Episode 2
2026	Believe Me	Harriet Wistrich	Two episodes
