= World of Pub =

BBC radio and TV sitcom (1998–2001)

- Genre: Comedy
- Running time: 15/30 minutes
- Country of origin: United Kingdom
- Language: English
- Starring: Phil Cornwell; John Thomson; Peter Serafinowicz; Alistair McGowan; Kevin Eldon
- Written by: Tony Roche
- Produced by: Jane Berthoud
- No. of series: 2 (radio); 1 (television)
- No. of episodes: 8 (radio); 6 (television)

World of Pub is a British BBC radio and television sitcom written by Tony Roche and starring Phil Cornwell, John Thomson, Peter Serafinowicz, Alistair McGowan and Kevin Eldon. It was directed by Michael Cumming and produced by Jane Berthoud. It is set in a pub in the East End of London.

The radio version was broadcast on BBC Radio 4, 4 March 1998 – 28 January 1999, comprising two series, each of four episodes of 15 minutes (series 1) and 30 minutes (series 2).

The TV version ran on BBC Two, 24 June – 29 July 2001, for one series of six 30-minute episodes.

== Plot ==
Each episode is set in an unsuccessful pub in London's East End. At the end of each episode, a disaster, visit from royalty, angry mob, etc. destroys the pub. The pub is run by brothers, the nervous Barry and the idiotic Garry. The only regulars of the pub are Bob and Dodgy Phil. Every episode revolves around one of Dodgy Phil's plans to improve the pub, a plan which Barry always has doubts about. One of the running jokes in the series is that, as the pub is next to a zoo, unusual animals are often found inside it.

The plot often follows the same formula: the pub is destroyed or needs rebuilding, and Dodgy Phil produces a scheme to re-launch the pub, which Barry disputes. Dodgy Phil telephones a friend, such as 'Mock Tudor Mick' or 'Logistical Nightmare Len', who arrives immediately to rebuild the pub, together with a set of characters represented by sound effects, and often Edith Piaf. The work is then finished in a short sound effect (often to the sound of the song "Je ne regrette rien"). The plan is flawed, and the pub is destroyed or closed down at the end of each episode.

== Main cast (radio) ==
- Phil Cornwell as Barry
- John Thomson as Dodgy Phil
- Peter Serafinowicz as Garry (first series)
- Alistair McGowan as Garry (second series)

== Main cast (television) ==
- Phil Cornwell as Barry
- Peter Serafinowicz as Garry
- Kevin Eldon as Dodgy Phil

== Guest appearances ==
The television series included some notable guest appearances:

- "Queen" – cockney singers Chas and Dave
- "Ladies" – Germaine Greer sings "Stand by Your Man"

== Episodes ==
=== Radio ===
Episode	Air Date	Title
Radio Series 1 – 1998
1. 1-1	1998-04-04	The Oldest Pub in the World
2. 1–2	1998-04-11	The Environmentally Friendly Pub
3. 1–3	1998-04-18	The Biggest Pub in the World
4. 1–4	1998-04-25	The 500th Anniversary of the East End
Radio Series 2 – 1999
5. 2-1	1999-01-07	The Millennium Pub Experience
6. 2-2	1999-01-14	The Miracle Pub
7. 2–3	1999-01-21	The First Ever Pub Olympics
8. 2–4	1999-01-28	The East End Gangster Awards

=== Television ===
Episode	Air Date	Title
TV series 1 – 2001
1. 1-1	2001-06-24	Queen
2. 1–2	2001-07-01	Drink
3. 1–3	2001-07-08	Bookshop
4. 1–4	2001-07-15	Sixties
5. 1–5	2001-07-22	Caine
6. 1–6	2001-07-29	Ladies

== Reception ==
Nancy Banks-Smith wrote in The Guardian: "World Of Pub (BBC2) was radio in its first incarnation and is still, perhaps, too talkative. Until the end when the Queen bursts into flames. There, I thought that would grab you. It is about an East End pub for East End people, and is not unlike The League Of Gentlemen though not in the same league. I'm not fussy. I liked it."

In the Radio Times Guide to TV Comedy, Mark Lewisohn wrote: "The three protagonists made the art of comedy seem effortless, especially Kevin Eldon whose idiosyncratic style was well suited to the bizarre Dodgy Phil. They were assisted by numerous comedy guests and by Tony Roche's imaginative scripts, a writer with seemingly endless ideas of spoofing yer cheery cockney."

== See also ==
- List of public house topics
