= Merman (company) =

British production company

- Type: Private
- Industry: Production company
- Founded: 2014; 12 years ago
- Founders: Sharon Horgan; Clelia Mountford
- Headquarters: London, United Kingdom
- Owner: Sharon Horgan
- Website: hellomerman.com

Merman is a British film and television production company founded in 2014 by Sharon Horgan and Clelia Mountford.

== History ==
Merman was co-founded in 2014 by Irish actress, writer, director, producer, and comedian Sharon Horgan and producer Clelia Mountford.

In January 2018, the company entered a first-look overall deal with Amazon Studios. Through this deal, the company partnered with Kapital Entertainment on all content from this deal.

In December 2019, the company entered a two-year first-look distribution deal with Sky Group's Sky Studios, with NBCUniversal's NBCUniversal Global Distribution also handling international sales for co-developed projects. Both NBCUniversal and Sky Group are subsidiaries of Comcast. Also in December 2019, the company entered a multi-year first-look deal with Apple Inc., which replaced Amazon Studios' first-look deal with the company.

In November 2024, the company's co-founder, Clelia Mountford, left Merman to launch her own production company, Sunburnt Penguin, with All3Media.

In February 2025, the company entered a two-year first-look television deal with HBO.

== Filmography ==
=== Television ===
| Year | Title | Network | Notes | Ref. |
|---|---|---|---|---|
| 2015–2019 | Catastrophe | Channel 4 | with Birdbath Productions and Avalon Television | |
| 2016 | The Increasingly Poor Decisions of Todd Margaret | IFC (USA); More4 (UK) | with IFC Original Productions; Season 3 only | |
| 2016 | The Circuit | Channel 4 | Television film | |
| 2016–2022 | Motherland | BBC Two; BBC iPlayer; BBC One (Note: 2022 Christmas special) | with Delightful Industries (series 1–2) and Twofour (series 3) | |
| 2016–2019 | Divorce | HBO | with Pretty Matches Productions, Kapital Entertainment, 343 Incorporated (season 1), Perkins Street Productions (season 2), Tuccillo (season 3), and HBO Entertainment | |
| 2018–2023 | There She Goes | BBC Four; BBC Two | | |
| 2018 | Women on the Verge | W | with Deadpan Pictures and House Productions | |
| 2018 | Bliss | Sky One | with Liberal Jew-Run Media Productions and Big Talk Productions | |
| 2019–2021 | This Way Up | Channel 4 | | |
| 2019–2022 | Frayed | Sky One (UK; season 1); Sky Max (UK; season 2); ABC (Australia) | with Guesswork Television | |
| 2021–2023 | HouseBroken | Fox | with AllenDen, Kapital Entertainment, and Bento Box Entertainment | |
| 2022–2023 | Shining Vale | Starz | with Other Shoe Productions, Kapital Entertainment, Lionsgate Television, and Warner Bros. Television | |
| 2022–2024 | Bad Sisters | Apple TV+ | with Caviar, ABC Signature (season 1), and 20th Television (season 2) | |
| 2021 | Frank of Ireland | Channel 4 (UK); Amazon Prime Video (USA) | with Amazon Studios | |
| 2023 | Dreamland | Sky Atlantic | | |
| 2025–present | Amandaland | BBC One | | |
| 2025 | Pushers | Channel 4 | with 2LE Media | |
| 2026 | Vladimir | Netflix | with Astral Projection, Small Dog Picture Company, and 20th Television | |
| 2026–present | Youth | HBO | | |

=== Film ===
| Year | Title | Director | Gross (worldwide) | Notes | Ref. |
|---|---|---|---|---|---|
| 2020 | Herself | Phyllida Lloyd | —N/a | with Cornerstone Films, Element Pictures, Fís Éirann / Screen Ireland, BBC Films, and BFI | |
| 2021 | Rebel Hearts | Pedro Kos | —N/a | with Anchor Entertainment, Level Forward, Artemis Rising Foundation, Whitewater Films, Quiet, XTR | |
