= Amandaland =

British comedy series

- Genre: Sitcom
- Created by: Holly Walsh; Helen Serafinowicz; Barunka O'Shaughnessy; Sharon Horgan
- Written by: Holly Walsh; Helen Serafinowicz; Barunka O'Shaughnessy; Laurence Rickard
- Directed by: Simon Bird; Alyssa McClelland; David Sant
- Starring: Lucy Punch; Joanna Lumley; Philippa Dunne
- Theme music composer: Oli Julian
- Country of origin: United Kingdom
- Original language: English
- No. of series: 2
- No. of episodes: 13

Production
- Executive producers: Sharon Horgan; Holly Walsh; Helen Serafinowicz; Barunka O'Shaughnessy; Clelia Mountford
- Producers: Tim Mannion; Caroline Norris; Arnold Widdowson
- Production company: Merman

Original release
- Network: BBC One
- Release: 5 February 2025 – present

Amandaland is a British sitcom television series which is a spin-off from Motherland (2016–2022) with Lucy Punch reprising the role of Amanda. The series also stars Joanna Lumley and Phillippa Dunne (also reprising their roles) as Felicity and Anne. The first series was broadcast on BBC One from 5 February 2025, followed by a Christmas special. A second series was released on 6 May 2026. A Christmas special is due to air in December 2026.

== Synopsis ==
Recently divorced Amanda must navigate parenting teenagers in new surroundings after moving from Queen's Park and downsizing to a property in the less affluent nearby South Harlesden area, in London.

== Cast and characters ==
- Lucy Punch as Amanda Hughes
- Joanna Lumley as Felicity Sanderson, Amanda's overbearing, sharp-tongued mother
- Philippa Dunne as Anne Flynn, Amanda's loyal friend and helper
- Samuel Anderson as Mal, Amanda's downstairs neighbour, a single father and potential romantic interest
- Siobhán McSweeney as Della Fry, one half of a local couple and part of the neighbourhood scene
- Rochenda Sandall as Fi, Della's wife
- Ekow Quartey as JJ, Mal's friend
- Peter Serafinowicz as Johannes Van der Velde (season 1)
- Miley Locke as Georgie, Amanda's daughter
- Anya McKenna-Bruce as Morten, Della and Fi's daughter
- Alexander Shaw as Manus, Amanda's son
- Jack Veal as Darius, Anne's son
- Archie Smith as Ned, Mal's son
- Cavan Clerkin as Daniel, Amanda's boss
- Jennifer Saunders as Aunt Joan, Felicity's sister (guest)
- Harriet Webb as Abs (season 2), Mal's former wife, now married to JJ

== Production ==
The spin-off series from comedy series Motherland was commissioned by the BBC in May 2024, with Lucy Punch, Joanna Lumley and Philippa Dunne reprising their roles. The six-part series is written by Holly Walsh, Helen Serafinowicz, Barunka O'Shaughnessy and Laurence Rickard, and produced by Sharon Horgan via her production company Merman. Clelia Mountford, Serafinowicz, O'Shaughnessy and Walsh are also executive producers. It is directed by Alyssa McClelland. Filming began in north London, particularly in Islington, Angel and Muswell Hill, in September 2024.

The cast includes Samuel Anderson, Siobhan McSweeney, Rochenda Sandall, Ekow Quartey and Peter Serafinowicz, as well as Miley Locke, Anya McKenna-Bruce, Jack Veal, Alexander Shaw and Archie Smith.

A second series was commissioned, and started on 6 May 2026. A third series was announced on 13 May 2026. A new Christmas special for 2026 was announced on 30 September 2026.

== Episodes ==
Series	Episodes	Originally released	
Series	Episodes	First released	Last released
1	6	5 February 2025	12 March 2025
2025 Special		25 December 2025	
2	6	6 May 2026	10 June 2026

=== Series 1 (2025) ===
No. overall	No. in series	Title	Directed by	Written by	Original release date	UK viewers (millions)
1	1	"House Party"	Simon Bird and Alyssa McClelland	Barunka O'Shaughnessy, Helen Serafinowicz and Holly Walsh	5 February 2025	6.47
Following the end of Motherland, Amanda is divorced and forced to downsize and move from Chiswick to So-Ha (South Harlesden), where she continues to raise her two children Georgie and Manus, now teenagers. She ends up being reunited with Anne as Amanda tries to climb the social ladder of the other mothers at the school which her children and Anne's son Darius both attend. Seeing a way in through the football club, she signs her children up despite her own lack of interest, while also dealing with her neighbour Mal, also a school parent. Upon realising Georgie has befriended Morten, the daughter of local celebrity chef Della, Amanda is given the opportunity to meet with her on the same night as Anne suggests going for drinks, causing chaos and trying to balance, with disastrous results.
2	2	"Car Boot"	Alyssa McClelland	Barunka O'Shaughnessy, Helen Serafinowicz and Holly Walsh	12 February 2025	5.16
Amanda is delighted when a local paper offers to document her new 'minimalist' home. She is then forced to sell some of her old items upon her mother Felicity's request, and after some persuasion from Anne decides to try and sell them as part of the annual football car boot sale in another attempt to climb the social ladder.
3	3	"New Job"	Alyssa McClelland	Barunka O'Shaughnessy, Helen Serafinowicz and Holly Walsh	19 February 2025	4.87
4	4	"Boyfriends"	Alyssa McClelland	Barunka O'Shaughnessy, Helen Serafinowicz and Holly Walsh	26 February 2025	4.76
5	5	"Camping"	Alyssa McClelland	Holly Walsh	5 March 2025	4.52
Anne organises a camping trip; although Amanda tries to get out of it, her boyfriend Johanne's interest in camping forces her go. Upon arriving at the campsite, Amanda is horrified to realise the campervan she hired doesn't have a toilet. She has two choices: use the communal drop loos, which she refuses to, do or cross her legs for the entire weekend. Amanda being Amanda attempts the latter but knows she can't hold it forever, leaving her in an increasingly awkward and desperate situation.
6	6	"The Heesas"	Alyssa McClelland	Holly Walsh and Laurence Rickard	12 March 2025	4.39

=== Christmas Special (2025) ===
No. overall	No. in series	Title	Directed by	Written by	Original release date	UK viewers (millions)
7	–	"Christmas Special"	David Sant	Laurence Rickard and Holly Walsh	25 December 2025	7.57
For Christmas, Amanda's family go to Aunt Joan's house, "11 acres and a ha-ha"

=== Series 2 (2026) ===
No. overall	No. in series	Title	Directed by	Written by	Original release date	UK viewers (millions)
8	1	"Careers Week"	David Sant	Laurence Rickard and Holly Walsh	6 May 2026	5.19
9	2	"Vantablack Coffee"	David Sant	Laurence Rickard and Holly Walsh	13 May 2026	4.82
10	3	"Soha Sofa"	David Sant	Laurence Rickard and Holly Walsh	20 May 2026	4.37
11	4	"Big House"	David Sant	Laurence Rickard and Holly Walsh	27 May 2026	4.17
12	5	"White Van"	David Sant	Laurence Rickard and Holly Walsh	3 June 2026	4.09
13	6	"Prom"	David Sant	Laurence Rickard and Holly Walsh	10 June 2026	4.12

== Broadcast ==
Series one started airing on BBC One and BBC iPlayer on 5 February 2025.

== Reception ==
=== Critical response ===
On the review aggregator Rotten Tomatoes, the first series holds an approval rating of 86% based on 14 reviews, with an average rating of 8.7/10. The second series holds an approval rating of 85% based on 13 reviews on Rotten Tomatoes, with an average rating of 8.0/10.

=== Accolades ===
In March 2026, Punch and Dunne were nominated for Comedy Performance – Female at the 2026 Royal Television Society Programme Awards.

At the 2026 British Academy Television Awards, Amandaland received four nominations: one for Best Scripted Comedy, which it went on to win, and three for Best Female Comedy Performance, with Punch, Dunne and Christmas special guest star Jennifer Saunders receiving nominations. The series was nominated in the Comedy category at the 31st National Television Awards.
