= Lucy Punch =

English actress (born 1977)

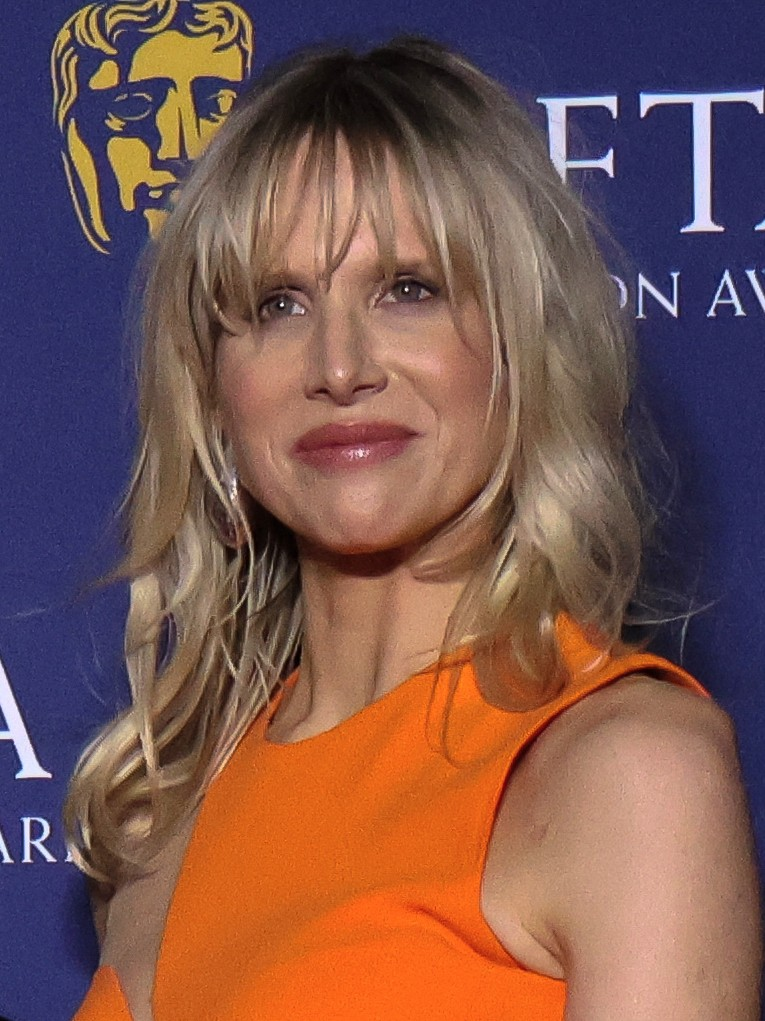
- Punch in 2026
- Born: 30 December 1977 (age 48); Hammersmith, London, England
- Occupation: Actress
- Years active: 1998–present
- Partner: Konstantinos "Dinos" Chapman (2014–present)
- Children: 2

Lucy Punch (born 30 December 1977) is an English actress. She played the role of Amanda Hughes in the BBC sitcom Motherland (2016–2022) and its spin-off Amandaland (2025–present) which earned her a nomination for a British Academy Television Award for Best Female Comedy Performance.

Her film credits include Ella Enchanted (2004), Hot Fuzz (2007), You Will Meet a Tall Dark Stranger, Dinner for Schmucks (both 2010), Bad Teacher (2011), and Into the Woods (2014). She has also appeared in the television series The Class (2006), A Series of Unfortunate Events (2018–2019) and Bloods (2021–2022).

== Early life and education ==
Lucy Punch was born in Hammersmith, West London, the daughter of Johanna (née Lowe) and Michael Punch, who ran a market research company.

She was educated privately at Godolphin and Latymer School in Hammersmith. She performed with the National Youth Theatre from 1993 to 1997, and began a course at University College London before dropping out to become an actress.

== Career ==
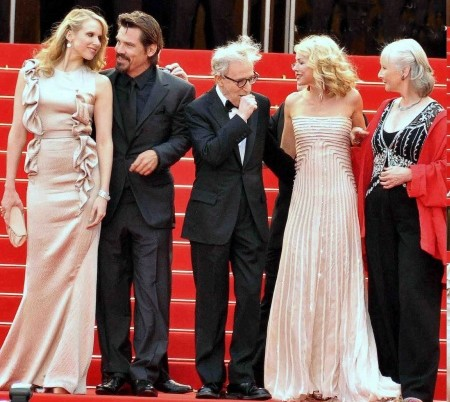
Punch (left) with the cast of You Will Meet a Tall Dark Stranger in 2010

Punch made her acting debut in a 1998 episode of The New Adventures of Robin Hood. Her other TV credits include the naive daughter of Alison Steadman's character in the short-lived series Let Them Eat Cake which starred French and Saunders. She starred as a football player in the children's TV show Renford Rejects and played the role of the victim Melissa Townsend in the 19th episode of Midsomer Murders.

In 2000, Punch appeared in the film Greenfingers. She made her stage debut as Elaine in Terry Johnson's West End adaptation of The Graduate (1967). She has worked at the Royal Court and Bush theatres, both in London.

In 2004, Punch played the receptionist Elaine Denham in Doc Martin. She left the television show The Class after appearing in 11 of the first 12 episodes.

In 2006, she won the Best Actress award at the Monaco International Film Festival for her performance in Are You Ready for Love? She played the murder victim and amateur actress Eve Draper in Edgar Wright's 2007 film Hot Fuzz.

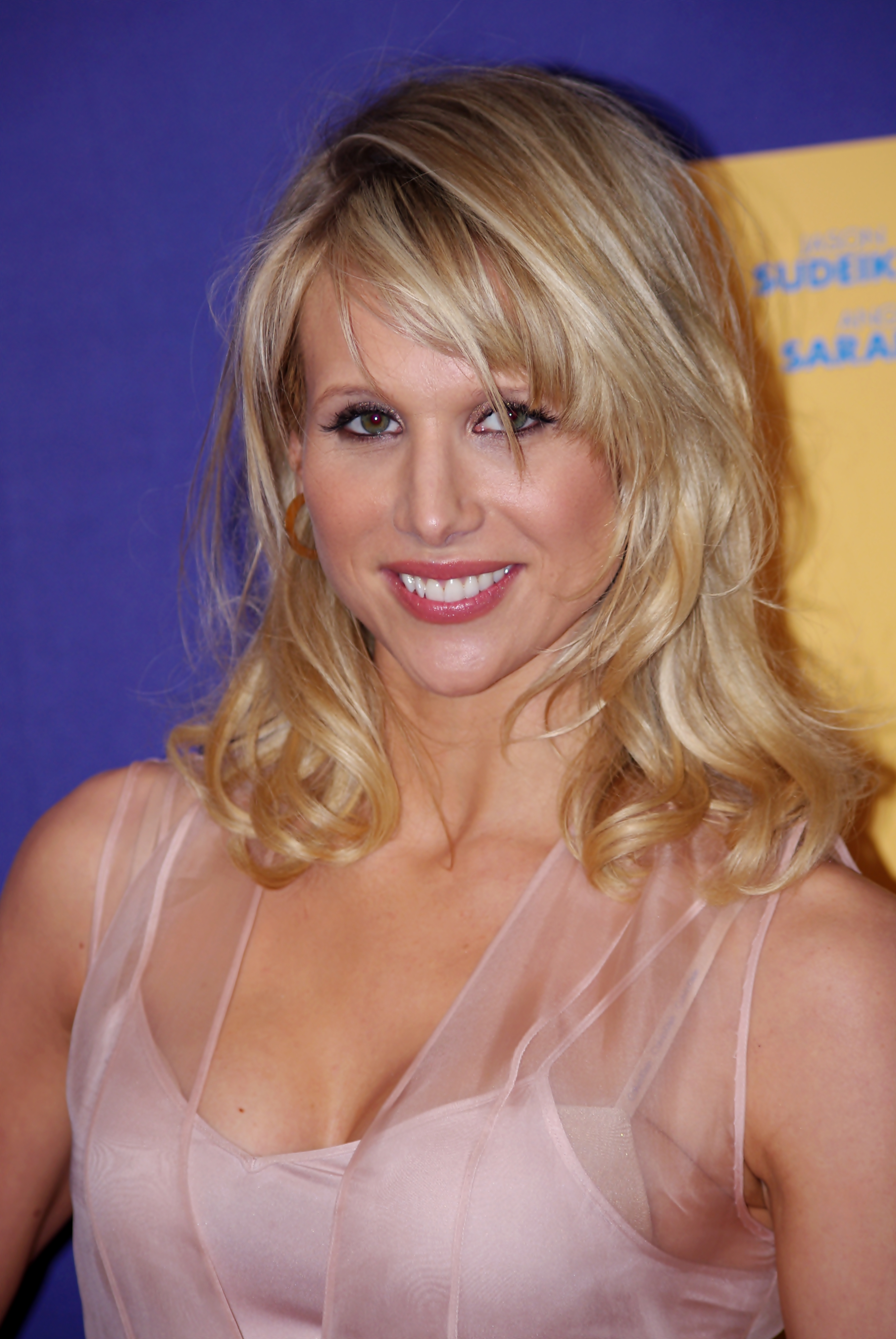
Punch in 2011

Punch starred in Woody Allen's film You Will Meet a Tall Dark Stranger (2010). In August 2010, she appeared in BBC Two's three-part police comedy-drama Vexed. In 2011, Punch appeared in Bad Teacher, portraying the sanctimonious schoolteacher, Amy Squirrel.

Punch was cast as Deena Pilgrim, the female lead in the TV pilot Powers, but the role was recast.

From 2016, Punch played Amanda, leader of the "Alpha mums", in the BBC comedy series Motherland. In May 2024, it was announced that Punch will reprise her role as Amanda in the spin-off Amandaland, with Philippa Dunne and Joanna Lumley reprising their roles of Anne and Amanda's mother Felicity respectively.

In 2017, Punch was cast in the role of Esmé Squalor in the second season of the Netflix comedy drama series A Series of Unfortunate Events, a role that continued through the show's third and final season.

In 2020, Punch starred in the short film Leap, which was part of the anthology film, With/In. Sanaa Lathan directed and co-starred in Leap, which was written by Margaret Nagle. It debuted at the Tribeca Film Festival in 2021 and was nominated for the Humanitas Prize as Best Short Film in 2022. It was the best reviewed film in the anthology, with Punch being singled out for her work.

In December 2022, Punch reprised her role of Amanda in the Motherland Christmas special.

Lucy Punch has played Cinderella's stepsister (or a version of the character) at least four times: "Regan" in Cinderella (2000), "Hattie" in Ella Enchanted (2004), "Fenola Gay" in Cinderella (2008) (part of the BBC series Fairy Tales), and "Lucinda" in Into the Woods (2014).

== Personal life ==
Between 2002 and 2005, Punch was in a relationship with James D’Arcy after they met during filming of the TV film Come Together. She began a relationship with artist Dinos Chapman in 2014. With Chapman she gave birth to her first child, a son. They had another son some years later. The family lives in the United States.

== Filmography ==
=== Film ===
Year	Title	Role	Notes
2000	Greenfingers	Holly	
2000	The Tenth Kingdom	Sally Peep	
2001	It's Not Me, It's You	Rose	
2004	Ella Enchanted	Hattie	
2004	The Life and Death of Peter Sellers	Lead stewardess	
2004	Being Julia	Avice Crichton	
2005	Festival	Nicky Romanowski	
2006	Are You Ready for Love?	Melanie	Monaco International Film Festival – Angel Award for Best Actress
2006	Stingray	Lucy	
2007	Hot Fuzz	Eve Draper	
2007	Grindhouse	Blonde in Don't trailer	Uncredited
2007	St Trinian's	Verity Thwaites	
2009	Big Breaks	Alexis	
2009	(Untitled)	The Clarinet	
2010	Elektra Luxx	Dolores	
2010	You Will Meet a Tall Dark Stranger	Charmaine	
2010	Dinner for Schmucks	Darla	
2011	A Little Bit of Heaven	Sarah Walker	
2011	Take Me Home Tonight	Shelly	
2011	Bad Teacher	Amy Squirrel	
2011	A Good Old Fashioned Orgy	Kate	
2012	The Giant Mechanical Man	Pauline	
2012	The Wedding Video	Saskia	
2012	Yellow	Amanda	
2012	Stars in Shorts	Julie	
2012	Stand Up Guys	Wendy	
2013	Cottage Country	Masha	
2014	Someone Marry Barry	Melanie Miller	
2014	Into the Woods	Lucinda	
2014	She's Funny That Way	Prostitute	
2014	Cake	Nurse Gayle	
2016	The Meddler	Emily	
2017	The Female Brain	Lexi	
2018	You, Me and Him	Olivia	
2019	How to Build a Girl	Sylvia Plath	
2021	With/In: Volume 1	Lucy	Segment: "Leap"
2021	Silent Night	Bella	
2022	Book of Love	Jen Spencer	
2022	Confess, Fletch	Tatiana Tasserly	
2024	How to Date Billy Walsh	Lilly Arnold	
2025	Jingle Bell Heist	Cynthia Sterling	

=== Television ===
Year	Title	Role	Notes
1998	The New Adventures of Robin Hood	Queen Stephanie	Episode: "Orphans"
1999	Renford Rejects	Sue White	Main role (series 2)
1999	Days Like These	Helen Foreman	3 episodes
1999	Let Them Eat Cake	Eveline	4 episodes
1999–2001	Big Bad World	Melissa	4 episodes
2000	Cinderella	Regan	Television film
2000	The 10th Kingdom	Sally Peep	3 episodes
2001	People Like Us	Kate	Episode: "The Actor"
2001	Midsomer Murders	Melissa Townsend	Episode: "Tainted Fruit"
2001	Goodbye, Mr Steadman	Linda Mortimer	Television film
2002	Come Together	Amy	Television film
2002	I Saw You	Esther	Episode: "Episode 1.1"
2003	Second Nature	Car Rental Girl	Television film
2003	Dinotopia	Shayna	Episode: "Night of the Wartosa"
2004	My Family	Sarah	Episode: "Luck Be a Lady Tonight"
2004	Doc Martin	Elaine Denham	Main role (series 1)
2005	Survivors	Juliet Savage	Episode: "In Deep Water"
2006	Agatha Christie's Poirot	Susannah Henderson	Episode: "After the Funeral"
2007	The Class	Holly Ellenbogen	Main role
2007	Comedy Showcase: Ladies and Gentlemen	Alice	Pilot
2007	The Sarah Silverman Program	Sally	Episode: "Ah, Men"
2007	The Omid Djalili Show	Miss Fanny Dashett	Episode 1.2
2007	Two Families	Irene	Television film
2008	Fairy Tales	Fenola Gay	Episode: "Cinderella"
2008	Wainy Days	Angel	Episode: "Angel"
2008	1%	Candace	Television film
2010	Vexed	DI Kate Bishop	3 episodes
2012–2013	Ben and Kate	Beatrice Joan "BJ" Harrison	Main role
2013	Hello Ladies	Mother	Episode: "The Wedding"
2014	Kroll Show	Violet	Episode: "Cake Train"
2014	Robot Chicken	Daenerys Targaryen/Arya Stark/Janice Rand (voice)	Episode: "Rebel Appliance"
2016	New Girl	Genevieve	2 episodes
2016–2022	Motherland	Amanda	Main role
2018–2019	A Series of Unfortunate Events	Esmé Squalor	Main role
2019	The Conners	Kyle's mom	Episode: "Preemies, Weed and Infidelity"
2020	What We Do in the Shadows	Lilith	Episode: "Witches"
2021	The Prince	Kate Middleton (voice)	Main role
2021	Gossip Girl	Saskia Bates	Episode: "Once Upon a Time in the Upper West"
2021–2022	Bloods	Jo	Main role
2022	Avenue 5	Dawn Djopi	2 Episodes
2024	No Good Deed	Trish	1 episode "Letters of Intent"
2025	Animal Control	Fiona Holcomb	4 Episodes
2025	Shark! Celebrity Infested Waters	Herself	5 episodes
2025–present	Amandaland	Amanda	13 episodes
2026	RuPaul's Drag Race: UK vs. the World	Guest judge	Series 3
2026	The Audacity	Lili Park-Hoffsteader	8 episodes

== Stage ==
Year	Title	Role	Notes
2000	The Graduate	Elaine	Gielgud Theatre
2001	Boy Gets Girl	Harriet	Royal Court Theatre
2002	A Carpet, A Pony and A Monkey	Kate	Bush Theatre
2014	Great Britain	Paige Britain	Theatre Royal Haymarket

== Awards ==
- 2006 Best Actress award - Angel Film Awards - Monaco International Film Festival - performance in Are You Ready for Love?
- 2026 British Academy Television Award for Best Female Comedy Performance nomination for Amandaland
