= Peter Serafinowicz =

British actor (born 1972)

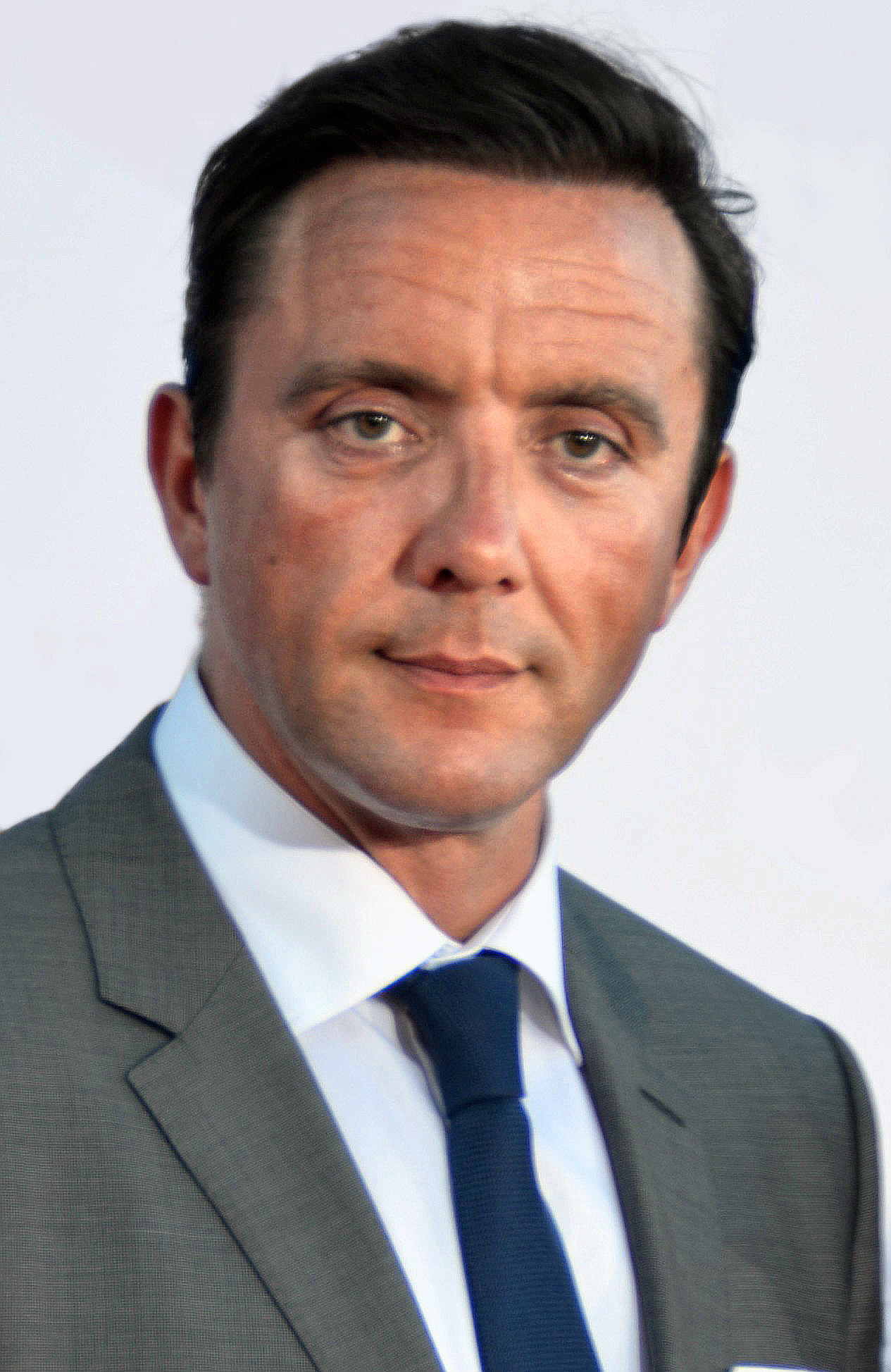
- Serafinowicz in 2014
- Born: Peter Szymon Serafinowicz; 10 July 1972 (age 54); Liverpool, England
- Occupations: Actor; comedian; writer
- Years active: 1993–present
- Spouse: Sarah Alexander
- Children: 2
- Relatives: Helen Serafinowicz (sister)

Peter Szymon Serafinowicz (/ˌsɛrəˈfɪnoʊwɪtʃ/ SERR-ə-FIN-oh-witch; Polish: [sɛrafʲiˈnɔvʲit͡ʂ]; born 10 July 1972) is an English actor, comedian, and writer. He is known for his roles as Pete in Shaun of the Dead (2004), Garthan Saal in Guardians of the Galaxy (2014), the voice of Big Daddy in Sing (2016) and Sing 2 (2021), The Tick in The Tick (2016), The Sommelier in John Wick: Chapter 2 (2017) and Spitelout in the live-action remake How to Train Your Dragon (2025).

On television, Serafinowicz created and starred in the comedy shows Look Around You (2002–2005) and The Peter Serafinowicz Show (2007–2008). He also voiced characters and worked as a creative consultant on South Park (2006–2015), portrayed Edgar Covington in Parks and Recreation (2013–2015), voiced the Fisher King in Doctor Who (2015), and starred as the title character in the live-action adaptation series The Tick (2016–2019). His other television work includes voicing characters in animated series such as Archer, Bob's Burgers, Rick and Morty, The Simpsons, American Dad!, and the second season of What If...?, reprising his live-action role as Garthan Saal.

Serafinowicz has voiced characters in video games such as Dark Souls II (2014), LittleBigPlanet 3 (2014), and Deus Ex: Mankind Divided (2016). He has also directed music videos for acts such as Hot Chip and went viral in 2016 for political satire videos in which he dubbed over videos of Donald Trump with a "sassy" voice, a Cockney accent, and a posh English accent.

== Early life ==
Serafinowicz was born into a Catholic family in the Gateacre suburb of Liverpool on 10 July 1972, the son of post office worker Catherine (née Geary) and scaffolder Szymon Serafinowicz Jr. His father was born and raised in Surrey to a Polish mother and a Polish–Belarusian father and later moved to Liverpool as an adult. Serafinowicz has a brother, James, a film producer, and a sister Helen, a writer who was married to Irish comedy writer Graham Linehan from 2004 to 2020.

At the age of three, Serafinowicz moved with his family to the Belle Vale district of Liverpool where he attended Our Lady of the Assumption Primary School. The family moved back to Gateacre when he was 14 and he attended St Francis Xavier's College in neighbouring Woolton. He later said: "I had a very happy childhood, but Belle Vale was very rough. I was only about three when we moved there, but I can still remember it looking very shiny, and it was all landscaped. But it was a very poor area, and it became scruffy quite quickly. [...] Gateacre is traditionally seen as one of the posh areas of Liverpool [but] it wasn't really that much posher!"

== Career ==
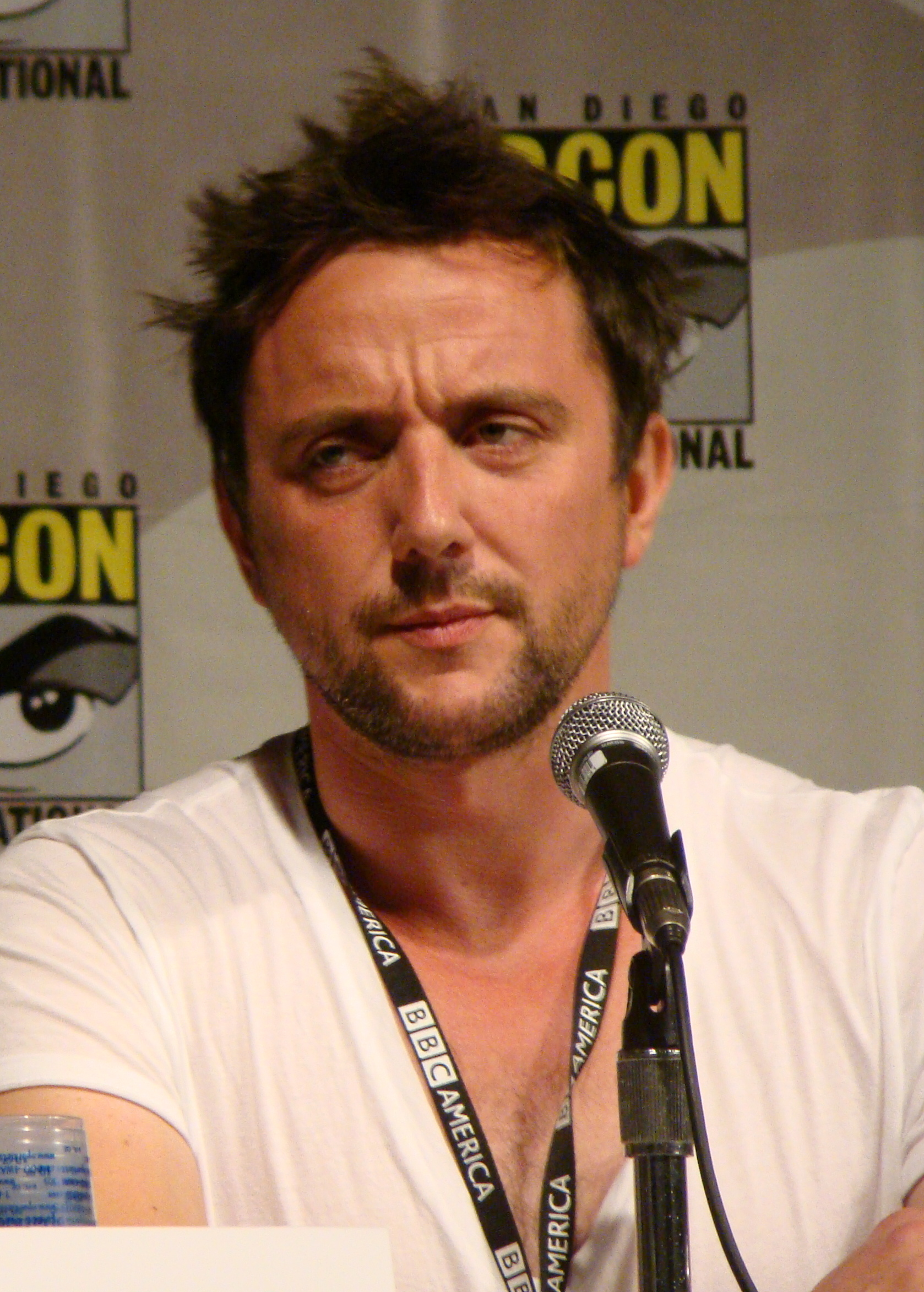
Serafinowicz at the 2010 San Diego Comic-Con

Serafinowicz made his broadcasting debut in 1993 on Radio 1 show The Knowledge, a spoof documentary about the music industry. From there he went on to perform in Radio 4 shows Week Ending, Harry Hill's Fruit Corner, Grievous Bodily Radio, The Two Dannys, and A Whole New Ball Game.

On 1 May 1997, he appeared in The Election Night Armistice as Moz Bingham, the fictional press secretary to the-then shadow Chancellor of the Exchequer Gordon Brown, who verbally abuses the BBC's Nick Robinson in a spoof phone call over the politician's news coverage. In 1998, he appeared on TV in Comedy Nation and You Are Here. He also had a role in the sitcom How Do You Want Me?, written by Simon Nye.

In 1999, he had several guest appearances in the Channel 4 sitcom Spaced, playing protagonist Tim Bisley's (Simon Pegg) nemesis, Duane Benzie. He made another cameo appearance in the series when it returned in 2001.

Serafinowicz voiced Darth Maul in Star Wars: Episode I – The Phantom Menace, but was critical of how low his pay was. He reprised his voice acting role for Darth Maul in Solo: A Star Wars Story, though his performance went unused.

In 2001, he took the lead in BBC Two sitcom World of Pub, playing the same character as he had in the show's run on Radio 4. He also appeared in The Junkies, an internet sitcom. In 2002, he played a scientist in the critically acclaimed Look Around You, a series of 10-minute spoofs of 1970s school science programmes such as ITV's series "Experiment". He co-wrote the show with Robert Popper, whom he met on the set of Spaced. The show returned in 2005 as a spoof of the BBC TV show Tomorrow's World, with Serafinowicz playing Peter Packard, one of the presenters.

In 2003, he appeared in another sitcom written by Nye, Hardware, in which he played the affable Kenny. He reprised this role in the second series in 2004. Also in 2004 he appeared in British romantic zombie comedy Shaun of the Dead, playing Pete, the uptight flatmate of principal characters Shaun and Ed. He appeared in boxing film The Calcium Kid.

In Sixty Six, the 2006 British film about a Jewish boy whose bar mitzvah is scheduled for the same day as the 1966 FIFA World Cup Final, Serafinowicz plays Uncle Jimmy. In the week before the 2006 Academy Awards a video circulated on the Internet of a fake news item (called "O! News", a parody of E! News) about a new Oscar statue, in which Serafinowicz imitated Alan Alda, Paul McCartney and Al Pacino.

A second "O! News" video later appeared, parodying the 2006 Apple Corps v Apple Computer lawsuit. This attracted the interest of the BBC, and a pilot was commissioned for The Peter Serafinowicz Show. A full series was broadcast on BBC Two in 2007 (with a Christmas special in 2008). For his performance, Serafinowicz was presented with the Best Entertainer prize at the 2008 Rose d'Or ceremony. The series was also nominated for Best Comedy Programme at the 2009 BAFTA Television Awards.

Serafinowicz made guest appearances on television, including the comedy shows Smack the Pony and Hippies (both 1999), Black Books (2000), I'm Alan Partridge (2002) and Little Britain (2003), comedy-drama Murder Most Horrid (1999), ITV drama series Agatha Christie's Marple (2006) and Parks and Recreation (2013).

His numerous guest appearances on panel shows for radio and television include regular appearances on The 99p Challenge, and on Have I Got News for You in 2005, 2006 and 2008; 8 Out of 10 Cats in 2005, and QI in 2003. He also appeared on Friday Night with Jonathan Ross on 19 October 2007; Would I Lie to You? on 8 August 2008 and 30 July 2010 and Never Mind the Buzzcocks on 15 October 2009.

In 2008, Serafinowicz was working with Robert Popper on a new television series and website, based on a spoof religion "Tarvuism" for US network Adult Swim. In 2009, he appeared in Universal Films' Couples Retreat as Sctanley, the manager of the Eden Resort, directed by Peter Billingsley.

In 2010, Serafinowicz directed the music video for Hot Chip's song "I Feel Better", their second single from the album One Life Stand. He followed this up in 2012 when he directed the music video for the band's song "Night & Day", the first single from their album In Our Heads.

On 28 July 2010, Popper and Serafinowicz added a new narration track to an episode of "Out Of Town" by Jack Hargreaves in order to create the spoof film "Markets of Britain, a short film by Lee Titt".

In 2010, he co-starred with Will Arnett in the FOX sitcom Running Wilde, devised by Arrested Development creator Mitchell Hurwitz. It premiered on Fox on 21 September 2010, but was cancelled by the network after 13 episodes.

In June 2013, Serafinowicz provided the English-language audiobook recording for the Roald Dahl novel Danny, the Champion of the World. In July 2013, he made his film directing debut with the dark comedy film I See What You Did There, which he wrote, along with Danny Wallace.

In 2014, it was announced that Serafinowicz would play the role of Crowley in the BBC Radio 4 adaptation of Terry Pratchett and Neil Gaiman's novel Good Omens.

That same year, he was featured in Guardians of the Galaxy playing Garthan Saal, a Denarian ranking pilot of the Nova Corps. He appeared in Series 9 of Doctor Who as the voice of The Fisher King.

During 2016, Serafinowicz created a series of YouTube videos entitled "Sassy Trump", in which he redubbed speeches given by Donald Trump with a camp voice. The videos were deleted from his YouTube channel in 2020, but have been re-uploaded by others. He has also created videos dubbing Trump with a Cockney accent and a posh English accent.

Due to Serafinowicz's impersonation of Paul McCartney, Matt Berry sang a duet with him on Berry's 2009 album Witchazel. The track in question was "Rain Came Down", where he was billed as Paul McCartney. He stars in the title role of Amazon's The Tick, the pilot for which premiered on 19 August 2016. In 2020 Serafinowicz guest starred in the second season of TBS' Miracle Workers.

In September and October 2023, Serafinowicz began touring the UK as his character Brian Butterfield from The Peter Serafinowicz Show in the (Placeholder Name) Tour. The show toured the UK again in May and June 2024 as Brian Butterfield's Call of Now. In March 2024, Serafinowicz played Tommy Dixon in the crime series The Gentlemen.

In February 2025, Serafinowicz played Johannes Van Der Velde in the BBC comedy drama series Amandaland. In March 2025 he hosted Netflix show Millon Dollar Secret. In May 2026, Serafinowicz appeared in a cameo role on Saturday Night Live UK, playing Reform UK leader Nigel Farage in the show's cold open. In April 2026 he returned as host for the second series of Million Dollar Secret.

He recorded the audiobook for Charlie Higson’s 2026 James Bond novel King Zero.

== Personal life ==
Serafinowicz met actress Sarah Alexander in 2002 when she was in a relationship with actor Gerald Harper, who was 40 years her senior. She left Harper for Serafinowicz and later married him. They lived in west London with their son and daughter. Serafinowicz and Alexander separated in 2025 after 23 years of marriage. Serafinowicz has attention deficit hyperactivity disorder (ADHD), which was diagnosed when he was 40.

== Filmography ==
=== Film ===
Year	Title	Role	Notes
1997	Doppelganger	(unknown)	Voice, short film
1999	Star Wars: Episode I – The Phantom Menace	Darth Maul, Battle Droid Commander, Gungan Scout	Voice
2001	The Junkies	Big Al, Narrator	Short film
2001	Calcium	Scientist	Short film; writer & producer
2003	Hello Friend	Email Voice-Over	Voice, short film
2004	Shaun of the Dead	Pete	
2004	The Calcium Kid	Dave King	
2005	Ripley Under Ground	Nigel	
2006	Sixty Six	Uncle Jimmy, Mr. Reubens Sr., Football Commentator	
2007	Grindhouse	Screaming Man	Fake trailer in segment: Don't, uncredited role
2007	Run Fatboy Run	TV Sports Commentator	
2008	Tales of the Riverbank	Various characters	Voice
2009	Couples Retreat	Sctanley	
2010	The Best and the Brightest	Clark	
2011	Killing Bono	Hammond	
2013	Anatole's Island	Narrator	Voice, short film
2013	The World's End	Knock-a-Door Run Home Owner	Uncredited role
2013	The Unbeatables	Loco	Voice; UK version. Original title: Metegol
2014	Muppets Most Wanted	Gulag Guard	Uncredited role
2014	SOS: Save Our Skins	Andrew	Voice
2014	Food Club	Narrator	Voice, short film
2014	Pudsey the Dog: The Movie	Edward the Horse	Voice
2014	Guardians of the Galaxy	Denarian Garthan Saal	
2015	Spy	Aldo	
2016	Sing	Big Daddy	Voice
2017	John Wick: Chapter 2	Sommelier	
2017	Going in Style	Murphy	
2017	An Ordinary Man	Miro	
2018	Double Vision	Virtual Assistant	Voice, short film
2019	Last Christmas	Theatre Producer	
2020	DC Showcase: The Phantom Stranger	The Phantom Stranger	Voice, short film
2021	Sing 2	Big Daddy	Voice
2022	The Bubble	Gavin	
2022	The School for Good and Evil	Yuba	
2022	Aqua Teen Forever: Plantasm	Neil, Big Neil	Voice, direct-to-video
2022	The Amazing Maurice	Death	Voice
2023	Sumotherhood	Krzysztof	
2023	Chicken Run: Dawn of the Nugget	Reginald Smith	Voice
2024	The Life and Deaths of Christopher Lee	Narrator (string puppet)	Documentary film
2025	How to Train Your Dragon	Spitelout	
2025	Jingle Bell Heist	Maxwell Sterling	
2028	Elden Ring	TBA	Post-production

=== Television ===
Year	Title	Role	Notes
1996	Spitting Image	Various characters	Voice, 6 episodes
1996	London Shouting	(unknown)	Television film
1997	Look and Read	(unknown)	Voice, 8 episodes
1998	Comedy Nation	Various characters	Unknown episodes
1998	Europigeon	Terry Wogan	Voice, television film
1998	Alexei Sayle's Merry-Go-Round	Voice-over	Voice, 6 episodes
1998	Jack and the Beanstalk	Second Henchman	Televised pantomime at The Old Vic theatre
1998	You Are Here	Dr. Phil Phillips	Television film
1998–1999	How Do You Want Me?	Dean Yardley	9 episodes
1999	Murder Most Horrid	Tony Frost	Episode: "Dinner at Tiffany's"
1999	Smack the Pony	(unknown)	2 episodes
1999	Sermon from St. Albion's	Alastair Campbell	1 episode
1999	The Magical Legend of the Leprechauns	George Fitzpatrck	2-part mini-series
1999	Hippies	Narrator, Robin	2 episodes: "Hairy Hippies" & "Hippy Dippy Hippies"
1999–2001	Spaced	Duane Benzie	3 episodes: "Beginnings", "Battles" & "Gone"
2000	Black Books	Howell Granger	Episode: "The Big Lock-Out"
2001	World of Pub	Garry, various characters	6 episodes
2002	The What a Cartoon! Show	Butch	Voice, episode: "Colin Versus the World in 'Mr. Lounge Lizard'"
2002	Ted and Alice	Mark	Mini-series; 3 episodes
2002	I'm Alan Partridge	Tex	Episode: "Never Say Alan Again"
2002	15 Storeys High	(unknown)	2 episodes: "Ice Queen" & "Pool Kids"
2002–2005	Look Around You	Scientist, Peter Packard	14 episodes; also creator, writer & producer
2003	Comic Relief 2003: The Big Hair Do	Terry Wogan	Television Special; segment: "Blankety Blank"
2003	Little Britain	Journalist at Prime Minister's Questions	Episode: "Biggest House of Cards". Uncredited role
2003–2004	Hardware	Kenny	12 episodes
2006	Agatha Christie's Marple	Walter Fane	Episode: "Sleeping Murder"
2006	The IT Crowd	Lift, Voice-over, Newsreader	Voice, 3 episodes: "Yesterday's Jam", "Calamity Jen" & "Aunt Irma Visits"
2006	Our Thirties	Austin	Television short film
2006	South Park	Darth Chef	Voice; episode: "The Return of Chef"
2007–2008	The Peter Serafinowicz Show	Various characters	7 episodes; also creator, writer & producer
2009	Stewart Lee's Comedy Vehicle	Voice-over	Voice, 6 episodes
2009	Snake 'n' Bacon	(unknown)	Voice, television short film
2010	Whitechapel	DCI Torbin Cazenove	3 episodes
2010	Driver Dan's Story Train	Driver Dan	Voice, 103 episodes
2010–2011	Running Wilde	Fa'ad Shaoulian	13 episodes
2011	Funny or Die Presents	Puppet	Voice, episode: "The Terrys"
2011	Shooting Stars	Brian Butterfield (alter ego)	1 episode
2011	This Is Jinsy	Eric Dunt	Episode: "Cupboards"
2011–2013	Archer	George Spelvin, Benoit, additional voices	Voice, 3 episodes: "Tragical History", "Jeu Monegasque" & "Once Bitten"
2011–2013	NTSF:SD:SUV::	S.A.M., Sagan	Voice, 21 episodes
2012	The Increasingly Poor Decisions of Todd Margaret	Tito the Cycling Lawyer	Episode: "Todd and His Valet Arrive in Leeds and What they Saw There"
2012	The Secret Policeman's Ball 2012	Paul McCartney	Television Special
2012	Watson & Oliver	Various characters	2 episodes
2012	Driver Dan's Story Train	Driver Dan	Voice; UK version, 2 episodes: "Whirly Wind" & "Picnic Puzzle"
2012	Comedy Feeds	(unknown)	Voice, episode: "Dawson Bros. Funtime"
2012	Childrens Hospital	Michael Caine	Voice, episode: "British Hospital"
2012	American Dad!	Goran the Mutilator	Voice, episode: "Killer Vacation"
2012	Bad Sugar	Rolph Cauldwell	Television film, pilot
2013	Fit	Brian Butterfield (alter ego)	2 episodes
2013	It's Kevin	Bill Grundy, Brad	2 episodes
2013	Playhouse Presents	Roger	Episode: "Hey Diddly Dee"
2013	Father Figure	Karl	Episode: "Chin Chin"
2013–2015	Parks and Recreation	Lord Edgar Covington	3 episodes
2013–2015	Axe Cop	Various characters	Voice, 8 episodes
2014	Adventure Time	Lumpy Space Prince	Voice, episode: "The Prince Who Wanted Everything"
2014	Mr. Sloane	Ross	6 episodes
2014	Gravity Falls	Blind Ivan	Voice, episode: "Society of the Blind Eye"
2014	South Park	Match Commentator	Voice; episode: "Cock Magic", also creative consultant
2014	The Britishes	Lord British	Mini-series; 4 episodes
2015	Moonbeam City	Nocturne von Groff	Voice, episode: "The Strike Visualizer Strikes Again"
2015	Doctor Who	Fisher King	Voice, episode: "Before the Flood"
2015	Hunt the Truth	Black Box	6 episodes
2015	Long Live the Royals	Frederick, Narrator, Demonic Hare	Voice, mini-series; 3 episodes: "Yule Scare", "Punk Show" & "Shore Much"
2015–2016	TripTank	Various characters	Voice, 5 episodes
2015–2016	The Adventures of OG Sherlock Kush	OG Sherlock Kush	Voice, 20 episodes
2016–2019	The Tick	The Tick	22 episodes, also producer
2017	At Home with Amy Sedaris	Turtleneck Man	Episode: "Making Love"
2017	Mickey and the Roadster Racers	Agent Chauncey Chips, Dr. Waddleton Crutchley	Voice, 2 episodes
2017	Neo Yokio	Various characters	Voice, mini-series; 6 episodes
2017	People of Earth	Eric the Cube	Voice, 9 episodes
2017	Rick and Morty	Agency Director Pavel Bartek	Voice, episode: "Pickle Rick"
2018	The Simpsons	Corporate CEO	Voice, episode: "Krusty the Clown"
2018	The Shivering Truth	Lyle Darpi	Voice, episode: "Tow and Shell"
2019	Bob's Burgers	Scottjohn Dansteve	Voice, episode: "Bed, Bob & Beyond"
2019	Cake	(unknown)	Episode: "Inside Out"
2019	His Dark Materials	Iofur Raknison	Voice, 2 episodes: "Armour" & "The Fight to the Death"
2020	Miracle Workers	King Cragnoor	7 episodes
2020	At Home with Amy Sedaris	Captain Benton Cize	Episode: "Travel"
2020	Wild Life	Octopus, Travis, Rodney, Guy LeFaux	Voice, 2 episodes: "Zook Club" & "Broadcast Zoos"
2023	White House Plumbers	William F. Buckley Jr.	Mini-series; episode: "True Believers"
2023	Dreaming Whilst Black	Howard	3 episodes: "The Reality", "The Friends" & "The Pitch"
2023	Midsomer Murders	Lucian Shirewell	Episode: "The Devil's Work"
2023	Rick and Morty	Oxygen-S, Eight, Infinity	Voice, episode "Rise of the Numbericons: The Movie"
2023	What If...?	Garthan Saal	Voice, episode "What If... Nebula Joined the Nova Corps?"
2024	Dead Hot	Danny	5 episodes
2024	The Gentlemen	Tommy Dixon	2 episodes: "Refined Aggression" & "Tackle Tommy Woo Woo"
2024	Royal Crackers	Sandy	Voice, episode: "Prison"
2024	Creature Commandos	Victor Frankenstein	Voice, episode: "The Tourmaline Necklace"
2025	Brian Butterfield's Call of Now	Brian Butterfield (alter ego)	Television Special, also writer
2025	Amandaland	Johannes Van Der Velde	3 episodes: "Boyfriends", "Camping" & "The Heesas"
2025	8 Out of 10 Cats Does Countdown	Brian Butterfield (alter ego)	Dictionary Corner guest, 1 episode
2025	Wolf King	Mack Ferran, Duke Manfred	Voice, 5 episodes
2025	Dexter Procter: The 10-Year-Old Doctor	Dr. Drake	2-part mini-series
2025-2026	Million Dollar Secret	Himself, host	2 seasons, 16 episodes
2026	Saturday Night Live UK	Nigel Farage	1 episode
2026	Hit Point	TBA	Upcoming series
2026	Harry Potter	Peeves	Upcoming series

=== Video games ===
Year	Title	Voice role
1996	Drowned God	Additional voices
2001	Z: Steel Soldiers	Lassar
2003	Warhammer 40,000: Fire Warrior	Space Marine Captain Ardius
2013	Lego City Undercover	Forrest Blackwell, Cornelius Burns, Jethro Hayes
2014	Dark Souls II	Mild-Mannered Pate
2014	LittleBigPlanet 3	Dr. Maxim, El Jeff, Papal Mâché
2016	Deus Ex: Mankind Divided	Duncan MacReady
2017	Lego Worlds	Narrator
2017	Lego Dimensions	Cornelius Burns, Forrest Blackwell, Jethro Hayes
2017	Lego Marvel Super Heroes 2	Kang the Conqueror
2027	Clutch †	George McBride

=== Audio ===
Year	Title	Role	Notes
2022–2023	Discworld	Death	Series released as audiobooks by Penguin
2024	The Seneschal: A Rebel Moon Story	Bartholomew	Main role
