= Motherland (British TV series) =

British TV sitcom

- Genre: Sitcom
- Created by: Sharon Horgan; Graham Linehan; Helen Serafinowicz; Holly Walsh
- Written by: Sharon Horgan; Graham Linehan; Helen Serafinowicz; Holly Walsh; Barunka O'Shaughnessy
- Directed by: Juliet May; Simon Hynd (pilot episode)
- Starring: Anna Maxwell Martin; Lucy Punch; Diane Morgan; Paul Ready; Philippa Dunne; Tanya Moodie
- Theme music composer: Oli Julian
- Country of origin: United Kingdom
- Original language: English
- No. of series: 3 + 1 pilot
- No. of episodes: 19 (+ 1 pilot)

Production
- Running time: 26–33 minutes
- Production companies: Merman; Delightful Industries (Series 1–2); Twofour (Series 3)

Original release
- Network: BBC Two; BBC iPlayer; BBC One (2022 Christmas special)
- Release: 6 September 2016 – 23 December 2022

Motherland is a British sitcom set in West London, which explores the trials of middle-class motherhood. A pilot episode, written by Sharon Horgan, Graham Linehan, Helen Serafinowicz and Holly Walsh, was first broadcast on BBC Two on 6 September 2016 as part of its "Sitcom Season". The BBC subsequently ordered a full series of six episodes, the first of which aired on 7 November 2017.

The second series was released on BBC iPlayer on 7 October 2019. The third series began transmission on BBC2 on 10 May 2021, with all five episodes being released on BBC iPlayer the same day. In the United States, the show is broadcast on Sundance TV. The series won a British Academy Television Award for Best Scripted Comedy in 2022. A second Christmas special aired on 23 December 2022 on BBC One.

A spin-off was announced in May 2024 titled Amandaland, centring around Amanda (Lucy Punch) with Philippa Dunne and Joanna Lumley reprising their roles of Anne and Amanda's mother Felicity respectively.

== Synopsis ==
When working mother Julia Johnstone's mother abruptly decides to stop taking care of her grandchildren, Julia is forced to take a much more active role in their lives and education. She becomes friends with working-class Liz and stay-at-home dad Kevin Brady, and finds herself interacting with the local mother group, including their shallow and acerbic leader, Amanda. Julia is constantly overwhelmed by aspects of parenthood, and receives no support from her perpetually absent husband Paul. Working at a PR firm at the start of the series, Julia eventually quits and starts her own PR business.

== Cast and characters ==
= Main cast
= Recurring cast
= Guest cast

Character	Portrayed by	Character Notes	Series		
Character	Portrayed by	Character Notes	1	2	3
Julia Johnstone	Anna Maxwell Martin	After losing her mother's help with childcare, Julia faces a far bigger role in her children's lives than before. She initially tries to become part of the Alpha Mums group, but realises she has more in common with parenting "misfits" Liz and Kevin. She has two children: Ivy and James, and is married to Paul.	Main	Main	Main
Liz	Diane Morgan	A sardonic and blunt-talking single mother who is unpopular with Amanda's clique. Liz forms a trio alongside Kevin and Julia. She has two sons, Charlie and Max, of whom she shares custody with her ex-husband, Lee.	Main	Main	Main
Kevin Brady	Paul Ready	A stay-at-home dad to Emily and Rosie, who unsuccessfully tries to ingratiate himself into Amanda's circle. His wife, Jill, an unseen character, treats him terribly and seems to resent both him and their daughters; they divorce in the third series.	Main	Main	Main
Amanda Hughes/Sanderson	Lucy Punch	The acerbic and self-centred leader of the "Alpha Mums", obsessed with compliments on her youthful appearance and energy. Extremely image-conscious, she pretends her marriage is perfect, but her husband Johnny treats her dismissively, and they divorce in the second series. She has two children, Manus and Georgie.	Main	Main	Main
Anne Flynn	Philippa Dunne	A timid Irish mum with several children who seems to be perpetually pregnant. She is one of Amanda's friends, although Amanda treats her poorly, leading her to grow closer to Julia, Liz, and Kevin as the series progresses. She is extremely over-protective of her children, Darius, Niamh and an unborn baby.	Main	Main	Main
Meg	Tanya Moodie	A busy working mum with a remarkable capacity for partying. Julia is initially jealous of Meg's ability to juggle, but Meg becomes good friends with the trio, especially Amanda who almost worshipped her from day one. She is diagnosed with breast cancer in the third series, but is later in remission.		Main	Main
Recurring
Paul Johnstone	Oliver Chris	Julia's uninvolved husband and the father of her two children. Paul only appears on the phone to Julia, making excuses for why he cannot help with the children, until the final episode of series three.	Recurring	Recurring	Recurring
Irene Lamb	Jackie Clune	The school receptionist, moody and terse towards many of the parents, but especially towards Julia.	Recurring	Recurring	Recurring
Marion Paterson	Ellie Haddington	Julia's mother, who is no longer prepared to provide a free child-minding service. After fainting in the series 2 finale, she is found to be unable to take care of herself, so moves in with Julia in series 3. She dies in the 2022 Christmas special.	Recurring	Recurring	Recurring
Ivy Johnstone	Connie Wilkins	Julia and Paul's 9-year-old daughter. She usually appears in a non-speaking role.	Recurring	Recurring	Recurring
Lee	Nick Nevern	Liz's ex and father of her children.	Recurring	Recurring	Recurring
Johnny	Terry Mynott	Amanda's husband, from whom she later separates. He is called Ian in the pilot.	Guest	Recurring	Recurring
Sam	Tom Meeten	Liz's farmer boyfriend whom she meets when camping with the group.		Guest	Recurring
Garry Yates	Robbie Gee	Julia's builder, on whom she develops a crush and flirts with awkwardly despite his indifference (and inflated invoicing).			Recurring
Guest
Andrew	Peter Singh	Julia's boss before she quits to run her own PR firm.	Guest	Guest	
Elizabeth Johnstone	Penny Ryder	Paul's mother, who takes more looking after than the children do. She appears in both Christmas specials.	Guest		Guest
Geoff Johnstone	David Calder	Paul's father. He appears in both Christmas specials.	Guest		Guest
Bill	Anthony Head	Meg's husband.		Guest	Guest
Felicity	Joanna Lumley	Amanda's mum, who has a similarly acerbic personality. Amanda cuts ties with her in the 2022 Christmas special, having realised their relationship is toxic.			Guest
Ms Vaughn	Natalie Cassidy	A teaching assistant who comes on a school trip to Fishbourne Roman Palace. She is dim-witted and constantly being sick.			Guest
Ashley	Martha Howe-Douglas	The mother of a boy in the same year group as the other parents'. She also comes on the school trip, but gets confrontational with Liz when Liz accuses her son for being racist towards Meg's daughter Jade.			Guest

== Production ==
=== Development ===
The show was originally a 2011 pilot on the American network ABC. Writer Sharon Horgan reworked the script when the pilot was not picked up for a full series and collaborated with Graham Linehan on turning it into a British sitcom instead. Following its pilot on BBC, it was picked up for a full series in October 2016.

=== Filming ===
The show is set in Queen's Park, but filmed primarily in Acton, Ealing, Bedford Park, Chiswick, West London and Muswell Hill, North London. Scenes outside the children's school are filmed at Southfield Primary School in Bedford Park. Other areas include Hammersmith, West Kilburn, Hanwell, Ladbroke Grove and Harlesden. Julia's house is 1 Avenue Gardens in South Acton and the University of West London on the Golden Mile (Brentford) doubled as Julia's work office.

In the Pool Party episode of series one, the lobby scenes were filmed at Mallinson Sports Centre at Highgate School.

The pilot was filmed in April 2016 and aired on 6 September 2016. The first series was filmed from late June to early August 2017 and aired from 7 November to 12 December 2017. Filming for the second series started in March 2019, and aired from 7 October to 11 November 2019.

The third series was in the midst of filming in October 2020 and all episodes aired in May 2021. The 2020 Christmas special was filmed in November 2020 and is the first episode of the third series but aired earlier on 23 December 2020. The latest Christmas special was filmed in November 2022 and released on 23 December 2022.

== Episodes ==
Series	Episodes	Originally released	
Series	Episodes	First released	Last released
Pilot		6 September 2016	
1	6	7 November 2017	12 December 2017
2	6	7 October 2019	11 November 2019
Christmas special		23 December 2020	
3	5	10 May 2021	
Christmas special		23 December 2022	

=== Pilot (2016) ===
No.	Title	Directed by	Written by	Original release date	UK viewers (millions)
0	"Pilot"	Graham Linehan	Graham Linehan, Sharon Horgan, Helen Serafinowicz and Holly Walsh	6 September 2016	1.74
Stressed mother Julia's day slowly descends into chaos when she struggles to find childcare arrangements and attempts to join the alpha mums for spag bol.

=== Series 1 (2017) ===
No.	Title	Directed by	Written by	Original release date	UK viewers (millions)
1	"The Birthday Party"	Juliet May	Graham Linehan, Sharon Horgan, Helen Serafinowicz and Holly Walsh	7 November 2017	3.2
Julia is an anxious middle-class mother who lives in a suburb of London. Despite being an events planner, she finds organising her personal life difficult. She raises her daughter and son with little help from her husband, and is thrown into disarray when her own mother informs her that she will no longer be supporting her with childcare. She is encouraged by her new friend, single mum Liz, to throw a party for her daughter Ivy's ninth birthday at home in order to gain reciprocal party invitations for her daughter, giving her free childcare in the future. Julia asks her husband to help, but he is attending a football match. Just before the party, Ivy starts vomiting and so is sequestered in her room, but it's too late to cancel the party. Julia assumes that the party will be a drop-off, so she is horrified when the mothers stay at her house for the party, making it crowded and meaning that there is insufficient food and drink for the large number of attendees. One of the children's mothers is Amanda, a narcissist who patronisingly insults Julia. Julia has hired the "Animal Man" as the entertainer: however, he arrives late, and the only animals he brings are cats – yet he expects a tip.
2	"Auction of Promises"	Juliet May	Graham Linehan, Sharon Horgan, Helen Serafinowicz and Holly Walsh	14 November 2017	2.3
Julia meets a former colleague, Caroline, outside the gates of her children's primary school. Caroline does not remember Julia. However, Julia is keen to impress her, so Julia becomes involved in a school fundraiser which Caroline is organising, despite Julia hating such things. Kevin becomes a "human cloakroom", wearing several coats simultaneously, causing him to become uncomfortably hot. Liz puts a great deal of alcohol in the punch. A "promise auction" leaves Amanda red-faced.
3	"The Pool Party"	Juliet May	Graham Linehan, Sharon Horgan, Helen Serafinowicz and Holly Walsh	22 November 2017	1.89
Julia plans to be at work for a war photographer's book launch, but turns up late with wet hair due to having attended a children's pool party. One of the (married) fathers at the party had once asked Amanda out and she rejected him. She tells the others that she thinks he still wants her and dresses to impress, but he has, in fact, forgotten about asking her out at all. A man to whom Liz is attracted accidentally leaves his wallet in a newsagents. She picks it up and arranges to meet him and return it to him, hoping he will want to turn it into a date. She is disappointed when he instead rides off on his motorcycle.
4	"The Cavalry"	Juliet May	Graham Linehan, Sharon Horgan, Helen Serafinowicz and Holly Walsh	28 November 2017	1.61
Paul is away on a stag do, so he sends his parents, Geoff and Elizabeth, to assist Julia. She does not want them to come, because their senility and deafness means that they are a burden rather than a help. Kevin tells Julia that he likes elderly people and will help her deal with them. Julia, her children, Geoff, Elizabeth and Kevin dine at a fish restaurant, where a misunderstanding leads Julia to pay for a large group's meals as well as their own. Elizabeth says that she and Geoff are moving back to London, which Julia is horrified by. Amanda is donating some of her clothes to a cancer charity; Liz buys one of her coats and suddenly becomes very popular with men.
5	"The After Party"	Juliet May	Graham Linehan, Sharon Horgan, Helen Serafinowicz and Holly Walsh	5 December 2017	N/A
Anne drives a people carrier which she is using for a carpool, which Julia unsuccessfully tries to join. Liz is angry with Lee, the father of her child, for cohabiting with a woman called Debbie-Louise, only 3 weeks after she believes he started his relationship with her. Amanda, who is having marriage problems, confides in Kevin that once a month she has sex with a soldier, Bobby, who is based at Aldershot Garrison, because her husband Johnny enjoys watching her have sex with another man. An argument at a party between Liz, Julia, Anne and Amanda is ended abruptly by Kevin telling them that Amanda is having threesomes with a soldier.
6	"The Caretaker"	Juliet May	Graham Linehan, Sharon Horgan, Helen Serafinowicz and Holly Walsh	12 December 2017	N/A
Julia hires Lyndsey (Sarah Kendall), a well-organised Australian nanny, apparently solving her child care problems. Unfortunately, Lyndsey has an abrasive and domineering personality, leading Julia to fire her, making the excuse that she was moving to the United States. Meanwhile, Amanda is keeping a low profile following Kevin's revelation.

=== Series 2 (2019) ===
No. overall	No. in series	Title	Directed by	Written by	Original release date	UK viewers (millions)
7	1	"No Mum Left Behind"	Juliet May	Sharon Horgan, Holly Walsh, Helen Serafinowicz and Barunka O'Shaughnessy	7 October 2019	2.00
Julia has a new neighbour and fellow school parent, Meg, a high-flying business woman. Amanda tries and fails to ingratiate herself with the newcomer despite sharing a mutual friend. When Meg takes Liz, Kevin and Julia on a night out they soon realise she is a completely different person once under the influence of alcohol. Despite some mentoring by Meg, Julia declines a promotion at work and quits her job.
8	2	"Soft Opening"	Juliet May	Sharon Horgan, Holly Walsh, Helen Serafinowicz and Barunka O'Shaughnessy	14 October 2019	1.48
Julia, now freelance, is getting to grips with working from home. At the launch of Amanda's new venture, a boutique called Hygge Tygge, she proposes to take on the public relations for the new store. After a successful campaign, Julia is aggrieved by Amanda's ungrateful attitude. After leaving some negative reviews online as revenge, the initial backlash against the store results in press coverage far more valuable than the detrimental effects of the review.
9	3	"Mother's Load"	Juliet May	Sharon Horgan, Holly Walsh, Helen Serafinowicz and Barunka O'Shaughnessy	21 October 2019	1.60
Unable to concentrate at home Julia decides to work from the coffee shop, where she meets a fellow PR professional called Nick. The relationship soon sours when Julia starts treating him like an unpaid PA. Liz, now with much more free time than she knows what to do with, comes to Kevin's rescue, who has volunteered to help with a fundraising effort. Amanda hires an assistant.
10	4	"The Purge"	Juliet May	Sharon Horgan, Holly Walsh, Helen Serafinowicz and Barunka O'Shaughnessy	28 October 2019	1.69
When rumours start to circulate of a male TV celebrity moving into the neighbourhood, Julia decides to go trick or treating with the children in order to engineer a meeting the aforementioned heart throb at what she suspects to be his house. Liz has an encounter with the star, but fails to recognise him and gives him the brush off when he tries to ask her out on a date. Guest Starring: Lee Mead
11	5	"Le Weekend"	Juliet May	Sharon Horgan, Holly Walsh, Helen Serafinowicz and Barunka O'Shaughnessy	4 November 2019	N/A
The parents decide to spend half term break in a rented country cottage. Poor planning on Kevin's part, coupled with the lack of alcohol, and a scarcity of food leads to frayed tempers. Anne is rushed to A&E with stomach pains only to discover she is five months pregnant. Liz makes a romantic connection with the local shepherd.
12	6	"Good Job"	Juliet May	Sharon Horgan, Holly Walsh, Helen Serafinowicz and Barunka O'Shaughnessy	11 November 2019	N/A
Kevin is guilt-ridden about not being able to attend school sports day as he has a presentation to deliver at work. Liz considers ending her relationship with Sam the shepherd. Julia is admonished for cheering on her daughter Ivy at the school's non-competitive sports day and Anne discovers Amanda's house is up for sale, which also comes as news to Amanda, along with the fact that her husband has filed for divorce.

=== Christmas special (2020) ===
No.	Title	Directed by	Written by	Original release date	UK viewers (millions)
13	"Christmas Special"	Simon Hynd	Sharon Horgan, Holly Walsh, Helen Serafinowicz and Barunka O'Shaughnessy	23 December 2020	3.01

=== Series 3 (2021) ===
No. overall	No. in series	Title	Directed by	Written by	Original release date	UK viewers (millions)
14	1	"Nit Blitz"	Simon Hynd	Holly Walsh, Helen Serafinowicz and Barunka O'Shaughnessy	10 May 2021	2.87
As a nit pandemic sweeps the school, Julia finds herself accused of triggering a second wave. Ostracised by the other mums, Julia needs to find a way back into their good books, so she throws a nit treatment party that brings everyone’s drama (and headlice) into her home. The party reveals that Anne has some big news, Meg is facing a crisis and Kevin has committed a terrible crime of passion. As Amanda super-spreads the gossip, Liz waits for news about a career move – will she beat that 17-year-old to a job in the local shoe shop?
15	2	"Catchment Area"	Simon Hynd	Holly Walsh, Helen Serafinowicz and Barunka O'Shaughnessy	10 May 2021	1.89
The mums (and dad) join the merry-go-round of secondary school open days as they face the choice of where to send their kids at 11. Julia panics about which catchment area she lives in and even considers a fake religious conversion to beat the system. As Kevin’s divorce progresses, Liz helps him navigate the shark pool of lawyers and makes a worrying discovery about her own situation along the way. Meanwhile, queen bee Amanda struggles with playing second fiddle to Meg’s illness.
16	3	"Mother's Day"	Simon Hynd	Holly Walsh, Helen Serafinowicz and Barunka O'Shaughnessy	10 May 2021	3.11
Mother’s Day leaves Julia feeling ignored while Meg gets spoilt rotten. Amanda endures a passive aggressive lunch with her appalling mother Felicity.
17	4	"School Trip"	Simon Hynd	Holly Walsh, Helen Serafinowicz and Barunka O'Shaughnessy	10 May 2021	2.95
It’s time for the Year 6 school trip, and Julia, Liz and Meg find themselves on the coach journey from hell with humourless school secretary Mrs Lamb and clueless teaching assistant Ms Vaughn. It all kicks off when a boy banned for bad behaviour is allowed on the coach along with his mother Ashley, and Liz decides to play the hero. Meanwhile, Kevin takes his driving test, and Amanda pivots her lifestyle brand Hygge Tygge online. She manages to persuade Kevin to help pack up the shop - with unimaginable consequences.
18	5	"Amanda’s FUNraiser"	Simon Hynd	Holly Walsh, Helen Serafinowicz and Barunka O'Shaughnessy	10 May 2021	3.44
Amanda’s PTA charity FUNraiser is doubling up as her birthday celebration, meaning everyone is dragged into a big event. Mixing sponsored cycling with Anne’s lethal cocktails results in a night of high drama and big revelations. Julia is ready to call time on her marriage to Paul and run off with builder Garry; Liz is thrown by the arrival of an unexpected visitor; and Meg rides high on her cancer all clear. Meanwhile, Kevin’s attempts to clear the air with Amanda just make everything worse, and a put-upon Anne finally loses her rag.

=== Christmas special (2022) ===
No.	Title	Directed by	Written by	Original release date	UK viewers (millions)
19	"Last Christmas"	Simon Hynd	Sharon Horgan, Holly Walsh, Helen Serafinowicz and Barunka O'Shaughnessy	23 December 2022	4.42

== Reception ==
On the review aggregator website Rotten Tomatoes, 83% of 23 critics' reviews are positive, with an average rating of 7.8/10. The website's critics consensus reads, "Motherland pulls no punches, creating an honest and hilarious portrayal of parenthood buoyed by brilliant performances from its seasoned cast - though for some viewers it may hit a little too close to home". The second series later received a score of 83% based on 12 reviews, with the Christmas special following on with a score of 100% based on 8 reviews. The third series later received five out of five stars by Radio Times and was released to positive reviews. The second Christmas Special, Last Christmas, which aired on 23 December 2022, garnered positive reviews.

== Adaptations and spin-off ==
In March 2023 an American remake under the working title Drop-Off was given a pilot order by ABC, being executive produced by and starring Ellie Kemper. In June 2023 its title was revealed to be Keeping it Together. ABC meanwhile passed on developing the show.

=== Spin-off ===
In May 2024, the BBC announced a spin-off of the series, titled Amandaland, to focus on Punch's character. Punch, Dunne and Lumley were confirmed to reprise their roles in the series.

The spin-off follows Amanda's life after divorce forces her to move from Queen's Park to the less prosperous nearby area of South Harlesden. Filming began in September 2024. All six episodes of the first series were released on 5 February 2025. A second series was confirmed in March 2026, and was released on 6 May 2026. A third series was confirmed to be in production on 13th May 2026.
