= Holly Walsh =

English comedian

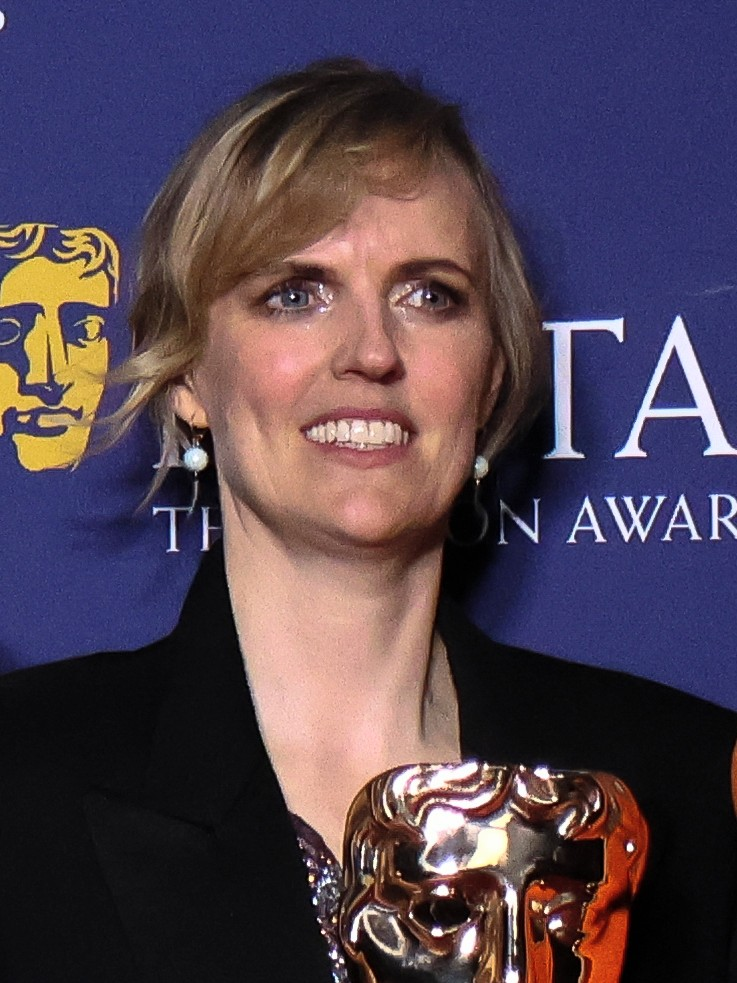
- Walsh in 2026
- Born: Holly Dione Walsh; 8 November 1980 (age 45); Guildford, England
- Education: Gonville and Caius College, Cambridge (BA)
- Notable work: Mock the Week, 8 Out of 10 Cats, Never Mind the Buzzcocks, Question Team
- Children: 2

Comedy career
- Years active: 2006–present
- Medium: Stand-up, television
- Genres: Alternative comedy, observational comedy
- Subjects: Politics, everyday life, British culture

Holly Dione Walsh (born 8 November 1980) is an English comedian and comedy writer.

== Early life ==
The daughter of an Anglican vicar, Walsh attended Christ's Hospital School, before going on to study History of Art at Gonville and Caius College, Cambridge, which she described as "the most boring three years of my life". After graduating she worked in various small art galleries in east London.

== Career ==
=== Comedy ===
While working in galleries, Walsh attended comedy writing evening classes including Stand up and Deliver and as a direct result wrote for Jo Caulfield on BBC Radio 4. In 2006, she switched to comedy full-time. In 2007, Walsh was approached by Frank Skinner to appear in a TV pilot for Avalon Entertainment, Frank Skinner's Skateboarding Dog.

Walsh was runner-up in Amused Moose Laugh Off 2006 on the Edinburgh Fringe, appeared at the Edinburgh Festival Fringe in 2007 and 2008, and appeared at Afterhours in between writing and filming, as well as co-hosting the AmusedMoose LaughOff 2009 with Jack Whitehall.

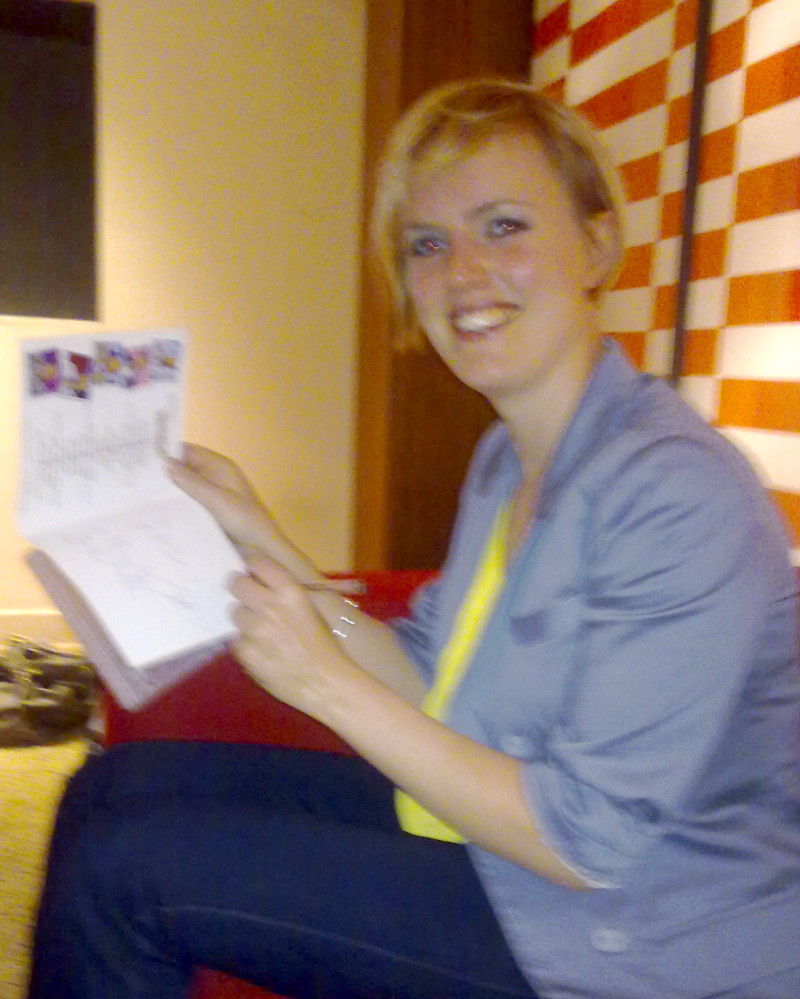
Walsh in 2009

In 2009, Walsh wrote for and appeared on The Now Show on BBC Radio 4, appeared on Winging It on BBC Switch, and made videos for Current TV. Walsh is also an occasional contributor to comedy podcast Answer Me This!. In January 2009, Walsh created a comedy film night called "Popcorn Comedy" with Jon Petrie, who later became her husband and BBC Director of Comedy; he is the brother of CBBC's Ed Petrie. In the summer of 2009, Walsh was a co-host and writer of Channel 4's TNT Show.

In August 2011, Walsh was nominated for an Edinburgh Comedy Award Best Newcomer, in recognition of her first full hour-long show. She received critical acclaim for the show, which drew on her life since breaking her arm in the Worthing Birdman Competition in August 2010. She has also appeared on So Wrong It's Right, a BBC Radio Four comedy presented by Charlie Brooker.

Walsh co-wrote Dead Boss with Sharon Horgan, a British sitcom set in Broadmarsh Prison, starring both Sharon Horgan and Jennifer Saunders. The show began airing on BBC Three in June 2012.

She has appeared on TV shows, such as Edinburgh & Beyond on the Paramount Comedy Channel, The Late Edition, The Matt Lucas Awards, Mock the Week, QI, and Would I Lie to You?. She has appeared on the radio comedy shows Out to Lunch on BBC Radio 2, Just a Minute, winning on her debut broadcast on 3 March 2014, The Unbelievable Truth and The News Quiz.

=== Other work ===
Walsh co-created the BBC television sitcom Motherland and its sequel Amandaland. For her work on the latter, she won the 2026 British Academy Television Award for Best Scripted Comedy.

Walsh devised, co-wrote (with Pippa Brown) and directs the BBC comedy The Other One. In 2008 Walsh was a stand-in continuity presenter for CBBC and for its show All Over the Place. On 12 June 2009, Walsh was a guest panellist on 8 Out of 10 Cats, on 18 August 2009 appeared on You Have Been Watching, Newswipe with Charlie Brooker, and on 3 September on Mock the Week.

On 15 October, she also appeared on the third episode of the new series of Never Mind the Buzzcocks, on Noel Fielding's team. On 13 September she appeared on Phill Jupitus's team along with JLS.

On 15 August 2010, Walsh sustained a suspected dislocated shoulder and fractured arm after leaping from the pier during the annual Worthing International Birdman festival. On 8 October 2010, she appeared on 8 Out of 10 Cats still with her arm in a sling, saying that she had 4 inches (100 mm) of metal in her arm.

Walsh appeared on Celebrity Mastermind on 30 December 2012, coming second to Ken Bruce. Her chosen subject was badgers.

In 2022, she was a guest on the BBC Radio 4 programme Great Lives, choosing to discuss the experimental novelist B. S. Johnson.

== Awards ==
- Best Newcomer, Chortle Awards, 2008
