= Sharon Horgan =

Irish actress (born 1970)

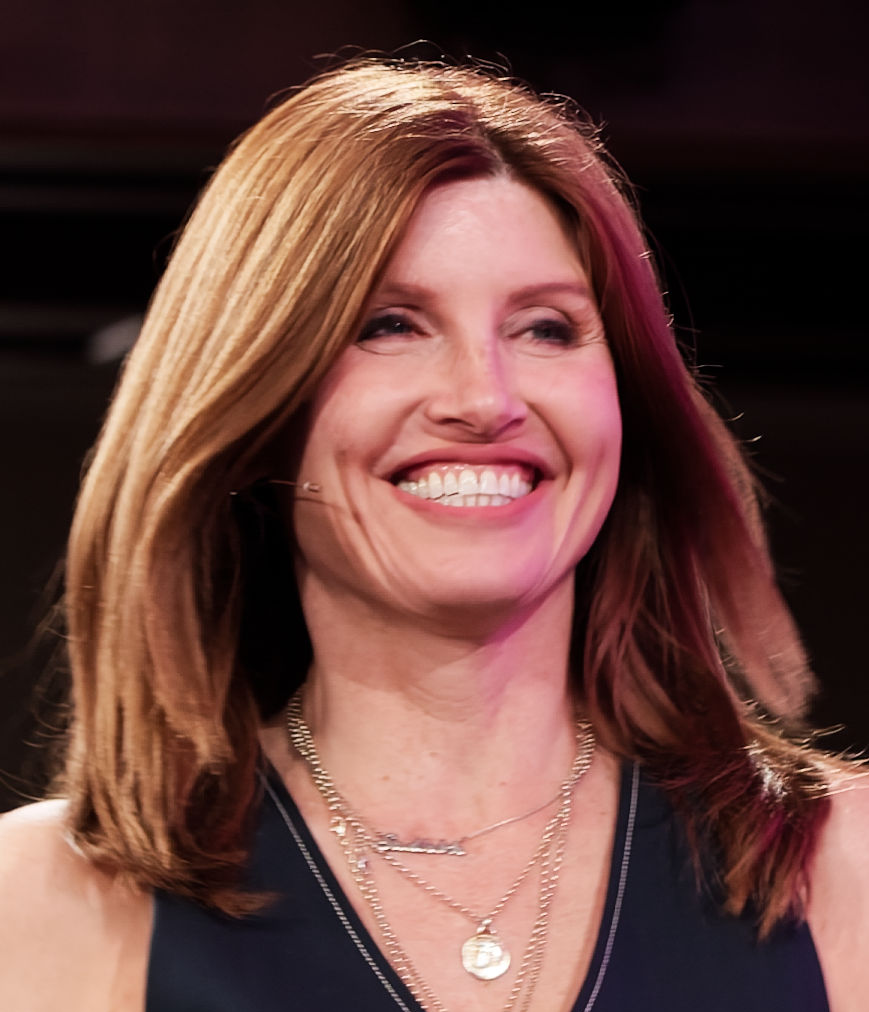
- Horgan in 2026
- Born: Sharon Lorencia Horgan; 13 July 1970 (age 56); London, England
- Citizenship: Ireland
- Education: Brunel University (BA)
- Occupations: Actress; writer; director; producer; comedian
- Years active: 1999–present
- Spouse: Jeremy Rainbird (m. 2005; div. 2019)
- Children: 2
- Relatives: Shane Horgan (brother)

Sharon Lorencia Horgan (born 13 July 1970) is an Irish actress, writer, director, producer, and comedian. She is best known for creating and starring in the comedy series Pulling (2006–2009), Catastrophe (2015–2019), and Bad Sisters (2022–2024). She also created the comedy series Divorce (2016–2019), Motherland (2016–2022), and Shining Vale (2022–2023).

Horgan has appeared in films, such as Valiant (2005), Imagine Me & You (2005), Death of a Superhero (2011), Man Up (2015), Game Night (2018), Military Wives (2019), Dating Amber (2020), Together (2021), Everybody's Talking About Jamie (2021), and The Unbearable Weight of Massive Talent (2022).

Horgan won the 2008 British Comedy Award for Best TV Actress for Pulling, while the show's 2009 hour-long final episode won the British Comedy Award for Best Comedy Drama. A seven-time BAFTA TV Award nominee, she won the 2016 BAFTA TV Award for Best Comedy Writer for Catastrophe (with Rob Delaney). Catastrophe was also nominated for Scripted Comedy in the 2020 BAFTA TV Awards and for the 2016 Primetime Emmy Award for Outstanding Writing for a Comedy Series. She has also won five Irish Film and Television Awards in both acting and writing for her work on Catastrophe. For her performance in Dating Amber, Horgan won an Irish Film and Television Award for Best Supporting Actress. In 2023, Horgan earned two Primetime Emmy Award nominations for Bad Sisters, including Outstanding Writing for a Drama Series and Outstanding Lead Actress in a Drama Series. The series also won her the BAFTA TV Award for Best Drama Series that year.

== Early life and education ==
Sharon Lorencia Horgan was born in 1970 or 1971 in Hackney, London. Her mother is Irish, and her father is from New Zealand and of Irish descent. Her maternal grandparents were from Midfield, County Mayo. She has two brothers and two sisters. When she was four years old, her parents moved the family to Bellewstown, County Meath, Ireland, to run a turkey farm.

She later said that, having been brought up on a turkey farm, she and her siblings wanted to do anything but become turkey farmers. Her second-youngest brother, Shane, is a sports pundit and retired professional rugby player, and the other children in the family work in the arts.

Horgan later used her childhood experiences for the semi-autobiographical short film The Week Before Christmas for Sky Arts 1.

After working for some years, she studied at Brunel University in west London, graduating with a BA in English and American Studies in 2000.

== Career ==
=== Early career ===
As a young actress struggling to make ends meet, she took a series of odd-jobs, until she worked at the Kilburn branch of the DWP for seven years. At the age of 27, Horgan started a degree in English and American Studies at Brunel University in west London, graduating in 2000. Around that time, Horgan met British writer Dennis Kelly, while they were both working in youth theatre, and they started writing together, producing material they then sent to the BBC, for which they won the BBC New Comedy Award in 2001 for Sketch Writing and Performance.

=== Acting ===
Horgan has appeared on stage, television and screen. Her first credited appearances on television were in The State We're In (2002) and Monkey Dust (2003), two sketch shows based on news and current affairs. She also contributed material to Monkey Dust. Her first named acting role on television was as Theresa O'Leary in Absolute Power (2003), a comedy set in the world of public relations and starring Stephen Fry. In 2005, she made her big-screen debut as Beth in Imagine Me & You, a British-American romantic comedy with Lena Headey directed by Ol Parker. She starred in two series of Pulling, which she also co-wrote with Dennis Kelly.

Horgan appeared as a guest booker in two series of Rob Brydon's Annually Retentive (2006–07), also on the BBC, a spoof comedy set behind the scenes of a chat show presented by Rob Brydon. She won a British Comedy Award in 2007 for Best Female Newcomer for her performance.

In 2010 Horgan appeared in The Increasingly Poor Decisions of Todd Margaret. The US/UK comedy series was written by David Cross, who also appeared as the title anti-hero, an incompetent American who takes a job leading the London sales team for an energy drink. She played Alice Bell, the café owner on whom he developed a crush. In September 2011, she appeared in the world premiere of Saul Rubinek's play Terrible Advice at the Menier Chocolate Factory in London. The play was set in Los Angeles and she played Delila, one half of its two warring couples.

In June 2012 Horgan was part of the ensemble cast for the pilot episode of Psychobitches, shown as part of Sky Arts 1's Playhouse Presents strand. In the sketch show, famous women from history are psychoanalysed by Rebecca Front's therapist; she played the novelist Jane Austen in the pilot, and later characters included Eva Peron, Cleopatra, Boudicca and Carmen Miranda. Two series of Psychobitches followed; the first was shown in May 2013, and the second in November 2014. She is well known for her role in Catastrophe, alongside Rob Delaney, a show which they co-created for Channel 4 and Amazon. Horgan also appeared in 2020’s second series of Criminal UK, BBC’s The Borrowers (2011), Dead Boss (2012) and Channel 4’s Free Agents (2009) and Bad Sugar (2012). She stars in and executive produces Channel 4 comedy-drama series This Way Up (2019–2021).

Horgan played a supporting role in the 2018 dark comedy film Game Night as Sarah, a newcomer to the group of friends unwittingly roped into the game. She also appeared in films Death of a Superhero (2011), Run and Jump (2013), Man Up (2015), with Simon Pegg, Military Wives (2019) with Kristen Scott Thomas, Dating Amber (2020), and BBC Two film Together (2021) alongside James McAvoy.

She has voiced characters in the films Valiant (2005) and the short film Miss Remarkable & Her Career (2010). In 2017, she provided the voices of Minerva Campbell (the long-lost mother of the protagonist, Finn the Human) in the Cartoon Network animated series Adventure Time, and Courtney Portnoy in the animated series Bojack Horseman. She voices Queen Dagmar in Matt Groening’s animated series Disenchantment, and Kathleen in the animated series Bob's Burgers. She voices a Russian ex show cat Tabitha in 2021’s Housebroken which she executive produced.

Horgan also appeared in the feature film adaptation of the West End musical Everybody’s Talking About Jamie as Miss Hedge, which was released in September 2021. She has a supporting role in The Unbearable Weight of Massive Talent opposite Nicolas Cage, which was released in March 2022.

=== Writer ===
Horgan's career breakthrough was Pulling, which she co-wrote with Dennis Kelly and starred in. She played Donna, an irresponsible marketing manager who calls off her wedding at the last minute, and one of three women sharing a flat in Penge, south London. It was noted for its broad humour about sex and the consumption of alcohol. Pulling was first shown on BBC Three in 2006, then repeated on BBC Two in 2008. The six-episode series became a ‘sleeper hit’, which gained iconic status with fans and was lauded by critics. A second series of six episodes ran March–April 2008 on BBC Three.

Despite good ratings and critical plaudits, Pulling was cancelled after two series, although an hour-long final episode was broadcast in May 2009. In 2007, the show was nominated for a British Academy Television Award and Horgan was nominated for a British Comedy Award. In 2008, she won a British Comedy Award for Pulling. In 2009, she was nominated for a British Academy Television Award and the show won a British Comedy Award.

In 2007, Horgan wrote Angelo's directed by Chloe Thomas and in June 2012 Horgan starred in Dead Boss, a sitcom set in a prison, which she wrote with comic Holly Walsh. From 2015–2019, Horgan co-starred and co-wrote the sitcom Catastrophe with American comic Rob Delaney. The two first met on Twitter, and because they made each other laugh decided to work together. They have both said Catastrophe was broadly based on their own personal experiences. In it she played Sharon, an Irishwoman living in London who becomes pregnant by Rob, an American she meets while he is on a business trip to London. Carrie Fisher played his mother. It was an instant critical success and after the second episode of the six-part series was aired Channel 4 announced it had commissioned a second series. Horgan was twice nominated for a Best Female Comedy Performance BAFTA for her role. In 2016, Channel 4 ordered a third and fourth season.

Horgan wrote Divorce (2016–2019), a US comedy series starring Sarah Jessica Parker, who plays a New York woman going through a lengthy divorce. In April 2015, HBO announced it had picked up the series after the pilot episode, and the show is Parker's first major acting commitment since Sex and the City. She was also an executive producer. Horgan wrote the short Dreamland, which won the 2018 BAFTA TV Award for Best Short Form Programme and an episode of Modern Love titled “Rallying to Keep the Game Alive” (2019), which she also directed. She also co-created and co-writes Motherland (2017–present) for BBC Two, a programme about navigating the trials and traumas of middle-class motherhood, looking at the competitive side and unromantic take on parenting – not the cute and acceptable public face of motherhood, which is now in its third series.

Horgan co-created and executive produced Shining Vale, alongside Jeff Astrof: a horror-comedy series for Starz. Courteney Cox has been cast as the lead. She is also writing alongside Kate Folk on a half-hour dramedy in development with 20th Television for Hulu, which will be set in the world of technology and dating and is based on The New Yorker Magazine short story ‘Out There’ by Folk. All three of these projects are co-produced via Horgan and Clelia Mountford’s production company, Merman.

=== Director ===
In December 2012, Horgan made her directorial debut with the semi-autobiographical film The Week Before Christmas, which was broadcast as part of the Little Crackers series of short films on Sky 1. It was set on a turkey farm in Ireland, and in it she played her own mother, while her father was played by actor Conleth Hill. She later directed an episode of Amazon’s anthology series Modern Love titled “Rallying to Keep the Game Alive”, which starred Tina Fey and John Slattery.

=== Presenter ===
In February 2005, Horgan co-presented the first series of The Friday Night Project (later The Sunday Night Project), a comedy variety show on Channel 4. On 3 June 2011, Horgan was the guest host of Have I Got News for You on BBC1.

She has presented a series of documentaries for Channel 4. In January 2012, in How to Be a Good Mother she talked to several families about their approach to child-rearing. In January 2013 in Secrets of a Good Marriage she discovered how various couples make their relationships work; and in On the Verge of a Midlife Crisis, she spoke to six women who had coped with the experience. Horgan appeared on the BBC Radio 4 show Chain Reaction in March and April 2015. One week she was interviewed by Olivia Colman and the following week she interviewed Dennis Kelly.

=== Production company ===
In 2014, Horgan established Merman, an independent production company, with Clelia Mountford, who produced A Young Doctor's Notebook, Mr. Sloane, and Cockroaches. The two women met while working on The Week Before Christmas. The company now has offices in London, New York City, and Los Angeles. Merman has co-produced many shows including Divorce (2016–2019), an American comedy series starring Sarah Jessica Parker, who plays a New York woman going through a lengthy divorce, Horgan also created the series. Merman produced the third series of The Increasingly Poor Decisions of Todd Margaret, which aired in early 2016. Merman also co-produced the critically acclaimed Catastrophe (2015–2019), BBC comedy Motherland, and W / RTÉ2's Women on the Verge.

Merman also makes Sky and ABC's Frayed (2019–present) created by comedian Sarah Kendall, which tells the story of a wealthy London housewife who is forced to return to her hometown in Australia, where she's forced to confront her past and the reasons that caused her to leave years ago. It is a co-production with Guesswork Television. Merman has created BBC and Britbox’s There She Goes (2018–present), which centres around Rosie, a severely learning-disabled girl and her family. For Channel 4 and Hulu, Merman produces the BAFTA winning This Way Up (2019–present), a comedy about moving on, moving forward and trying to find happiness. Áine, played by writer Aisling Bea, is a whip-smart English-as-a-foreign-language teacher trying to pull her life back together after a "teeny little nervous breakdown". Her sister Shona is played by Horgan. Merman produces Channel 4 and Amazon's Frank of Ireland (2021–present), created by Domhnall and Brian Gleeson, the hilarious story of a man's hapless search for respect.

Merman has co-produced its first feature, Herself (2021) alongside Element Pictures, a female-fronted film that follows a broken family's journey to find a home set during the Irish housing crisis. Herself had its debut at Sundance in January 2020, was selected for the London Film Festival in October 2020, and was released in Irish and UK cinemas on 10 September 2021. Merman co-produced 2021's animated comedy Housebroken for Fox, co-created with Clea Duvall, Jennifer Crittenden, and Gabrielle Allan.

Merman also produced the Starz horror-comedy series Shining Vale, starring Courteney Cox, Greg Kinnear, and Mira Sorvino.

The company has won and been nominated for a whole host of awards, including the film Herself longlisted for Outstanding British Film at the 2021 BAFTA Film Awards, There She Goes winning Best Returning Comedy-Drama Series at the 2020 C21 International Drama Awards and a Female Performance in a Comedy award at the 2019 BAFTA TV Awards. Frayed was nominated for five 2019 Australian Academy of Cinema and Television Arts Awards. Merman was nominated for Multichannel Production Company of the Year at the 2020 Broadcast Digital Awards and Production Company of the Year at the 2019 Edinburgh TV Awards.

== Personal life ==
Horgan married businessman Jeremy Rainbird on 16 October 2005. The couple lived in London, with their two daughters, Sadhbh and Amer, born in 2004 and 2008 respectively. They separated in November 2019 and their divorce was finalised by early 2020.

One of her younger brothers, Shane, is a former international rugby union player who played wing or centre for Leinster and Ireland, and is now a rugby analyst for RTÉ Sports. Her youngest brother is Mark Horgan of Second Captains and creator of acclaimed podcasts Where is George Gibney? and Stakeknife.

== Filmography ==
=== Film ===
Year	Title	Role	Notes
2005	Imagine Me & You	Beth	
2005	Valiant	Charles De Girl (voice)	
2010	Miss Remarkable & Her Career	Miss Remarkable (voice)	Short film English dub
2011	Death of a Superhero	Renata Clarke	
2013	Run & Jump	Tara	
2015	Man Up	Elaine	
2018	Game Night	Sarah Darcy	
2019	Military Wives	Lisa	
2019	How to Build a Girl	Jo March	
2020	Dating Amber	Hannah Cotter	
2021	Ladies Room	Narrator	Short film
2021	Everybody's Talking About Jamie	Miss Hedge	
2022	The Unbearable Weight of Massive Talent	Olivia Henson	
2023	A Greyhound of a Girl	Scarlett (voice)	
2023	Rally Road Racers	Abby Jacks (voice)	

=== Television ===
Year	Title	Role	Notes
2002	Comedy Lab	Unknown	Episode: "Shoreditch Tw*t"
2002	The State We're In	Herself	Series 1
2003	Monkey Dust	Unknown	Unknown episode
2003	Absolute Power	Theresa O'Leary	Episode: "History Man"
2005	The Friday Night Project	Herself	8 episodes
2005	Broken News	Katie Tate	6 episodes
2006–2007	Rob Brydon's Annually Retentive	Guest Booker	12 episodes
2006–2009	Pulling	Donna	13 episodes Also co-creator, writer, and executive producer
2007	Angelo's	Karen	6 episodes Also creator and writer
2007	Strutter	Unknown	Episode: "#2.7"
2009	Free Agents	Helen Ryan	6 episodes
2010	The Increasingly Poor Decisions of Todd Margaret	Alice Bell	20 episodes
2010	Big Babies	Carole (voice)	13 episodes
2010	We Need Answers	Herself	Episode: "Exploring Ireland"
2010	Stanley Park	Auntie Pat	Pilot
2011	Have I Got News For You	Herself	Episode: "#41.8"
2011	The Borrowers	Homily Clock	Television film
2012	How To Be A Good Mother	Herself	Television special
2012	Bad Sugar	Lucy Cauldwell	Pilot
2012	Dead Boss	Helen Stephens	6 episodes Also co-creator, writer, and executive producer
2012	The Week Before Christmas	Sharon's Mum	Television film Also director and writer
2012–2014	Psychobitches	Various characters	11 episodes
2013	Crackanory	Herself	Episode: "The Translator & Road to Hell"
2013	Moving On	Sarah	Episode: "Back By Six"
2013	Bad Management	Eve	Unaired pilot Also co-creator, writer, and executive producer
2013	Secrets of a Good Marriage	Herself	Television special
2013	Verge of a Midlife Crisis	Herself	Television special
2015	Moone Boy	Herself	Episode: "Where the Streets Do Have Names"
2015–2019	Catastrophe	Sharon Morris	24 episodes Also co-creator, writer, and executive producer
2016	Glued	None	Creator, writer, and executive producer
2016–2019	Divorce	None	Creator, writer, and executive producer
2016–2022	Motherland	None	Co-creator, writer, and executive producer
2017	Adventure Time	Minerva Campbell (voice)	4 episodes
2017	Bojack Horseman	Courtney Portnoy (voice)	4 episodes
2018	Women on the Verge	Dr. Fitzgerald	6 episodes Also co-creator, writer, and executive producer
2018–2023	Disenchantment	Queen Dagmar (voice)	24 episodes
2019	Modern Love	None	Episode: "Rallying to Keep the Game Alive"; Director and writer
2019–2023	Bob's Burgers	Kathleen (voice)	3 episodes
2019–2022	Frayed	Norma Staircastle	Episode: "#1.1"; Also executive producer
2019–2021	This Way Up	Shona	12 episodes Also executive producer
2020	Criminal: UK	Danielle Dunne	Episode: "Danielle"
2021	Together	She	Television film
2021–2023	HouseBroken	Tabitha (voice)	30 episodes Also executive producer
2022–2023	Shining Vale	None	Co-creator, writer, and executive producer
2022–2024	Bad Sisters	Eva Garvey	18 episodes Also co-creator, writer, and executive producer
2023	Best Interests	Nicci	4 episodes
2023-2025	Adventure Time: Fionna and Cake	Minerva Campbell (voice)	3 episodes
2023	Dreamland	None	Creator and executive producer
2024	Mr. & Mrs. Smith	Gavol Martin	Episode: "First Vacation"
2025	Amandaland	None	Executive producer
2025	The Twisted Tale of Amanda Knox	Edda Mellas	
2026	Vladimir	None	Executive producer
2026	Futurama	Queen Dagmar (voice)	Episode :"A New New York Yankee in King Elfo's Court"
2026–present	Youth	Alex	Also creator, writer and executive producer

=== Radio ===
Year	Title	Role	Notes
2015	Chain Reaction	Herself	2 episodes

=== Theatre ===
Year	Title	Role	Notes
2011	Terrible Advice	Delila	Menier Chocolate Factory

== Awards and nominations ==
Year	Association	Category	Work	Result	Ref.
2001	BBC New Comedy Awards	Best Sketch Writing and Performance	—N/a	Won	
2007	BAFTA TV Awards	Best Situation Comedy	Pulling	Nominated	
2007	British Comedy Awards	Best Female Newcomer	Rob Brydon's Annually Retentive / Pulling	Nominated	
2008	British Comedy Awards	Best TV Comedy Actress	Pulling	Won	
2009	British Comedy Awards	Best TV Comedy Drama	Pulling: Special	Won	
2009	BAFTA TV Awards	Best Comedy Performance	Pulling	Nominated	
2013	International 3D Awards	International Jury Prize	The Week Before Christmas	Won	
2015	TV Choice Awards	Best Comedy	Catastrophe	Nominated	
2015	Edinburgh Television Awards	Best New Programme	Catastrophe	Nominated	
2015	IFTA Awards	Best Female Performance in Soap or Comedy	Catastrophe	Won	
2015	IFTA Awards	Best Writer in a Soap or Comedy	Catastrophe	Won	
2016	Primetime Emmy Awards	Outstanding Writing for a Comedy Series	Catastrophe	Nominated	
2016	BAFTA TV Awards	Best Female Comedy Performance	Catastrophe	Nominated	
2016	BAFTA TV Craft Awards	Best Writer: Comedy	Catastrophe	Won	
2016	IFTA Awards	Best Lead Actress (Television)	Catastrophe	Won	
2016	IFTA Awards	Best Writer in a Soap or Comedy	Catastrophe	Won	
2018	BAFTA TV Awards	Best Female Comedy Performance	Catastrophe	Nominated	
2018	BAFTA TV Awards	Best Scripted Comedy	Catastrophe	Nominated	
2018	BAFTA TV Craft Awards	Best Writer: Comedy	Catastrophe	Nominated	
2018	IFTA Awards	Best Female Performance in a Soap or Comedy	Catastrophe	Won	
2018	IFTA Awards	Best Writer in a Soap or Comedy	Catastrophe	Nominated	
2019	AACTA Awards	Best Television Comedy Series	Frayed	Nominated	
2020	BAFTA TV Awards	Best Scripted Comedy	Catastrophe	Nominated	
2021	IFTA Awards	Best Actress in a Supporting Role – Film	Dating Amber	Won	
2021	IFTA Awards	Best Film	Herself	Nominated	
2022	Peabody Awards	Entertainment	Bad Sisters	Won	
2023	Critics' Choice Television Awards	Best Drama Series	Bad Sisters	Nominated	
2023	Critics' Choice Television Awards	Best Actress in a Drama Series	Bad Sisters	Nominated	
2023	Writers Guild of America Awards	Best Written New Series	Bad Sisters	Nominated	
2023	Writers Guild of America Awards	Episodic Drama	Bad Sisters	Nominated	
2023	BAFTA TV Awards	Best Drama Series	Bad Sisters	Won	
2023	Irish Film & Television Awards	Television Drama	Bad Sisters	Won	
2023	Irish Film & Television Awards	Script – Television Drama	Bad Sisters	Nominated	
2023	Irish Film & Television Awards	Actress – Television Drama	Bad Sisters	Won	
2023	Primetime Emmy Awards	Outstanding Writing for a Drama Series	Bad Sisters	Nominated	
2023	Primetime Emmy Awards	Outstanding Lead Actress in a Drama Series	Bad Sisters	Nominated	
2025	Primetime Emmy Awards	Outstanding Lead Actress in a Drama Series	Bad Sisters	Nominated	
