= Aisling Bea =

Irish comedian, actress (born 1984)

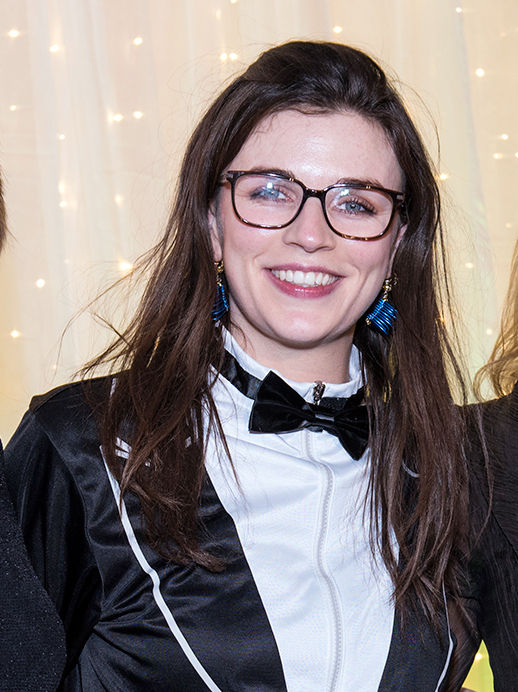
- Bea in 2017
- Born: Aisling Clíodhnadh O'Sullivan; 16 March 1984 (age 42); Kildare, Ireland
- Education: Trinity College, Dublin (B.A.); London Academy of Music and Dramatic Art
- Occupations: Comedian; actress; screenwriter
- Years active: 2009–present
- Known for: This Way Up; "Eve of the Daleks"
- Partner: Jack Freeman (2022–present)
- Children: 1
- Website: aislingbea.com

Aisling Clíodhnadh O'Sullivan (born 16 March 1984), known professionally as Aisling Bea (/ˈæʃlɪŋ ˈbiː/ ASH-ling BEE), is an Irish comedian, actress and screenwriter. She created, wrote and starred in the comedy series This Way Up on Channel 4. As a stand-up comedian, she won the So You Think You're Funny award at the Edinburgh Festival Fringe in 2012, being only the second woman to win the award in its then-25-year history. She also appears regularly on light entertainment comedy panel shows such as QI and 8 Out of 10 Cats and was a contestant on series 5 of Taskmaster.

== Early life and education ==
Bea was born Aisling Cliodhnadh O'Sullivan in Kildare, Ireland. Her father, Brian, was a horse veterinarian who died by suicide when Bea was three years old; she was not told how he had died until she was 13. She adopted the stage surname "Bea" as a tribute to her father, taking it from a short form of his first name. Bea and her younger sister, Sinéad (who is now a Hollywood costume designer), were raised by their mother, Helen (née Moloney), a secondary school teacher who had previously trained jockeys at the Racing Academy and Centre of Education. She was also a professional flat-race jockey, and later ran a jockey school. Her family was "obsessed" with horses and race meetings.

Her great-aunt was playwright Siobhán Ní Shúilleabháin, and musician Liam O'Flynn was a family friend. Bea's grandfather was school inspector and Irish Language writer, Mícheál Ó Súilleabháin, author of Créamaraí, An Fear Aduaidh and Peacaí na nAthaireacha.

In her youth, Bea worked as a tour guide at the Irish National Stud. However, she knew from a young age that she was not interested in the horse racing industry; instead, she had a passion for performing.

Bea was educated at Presentation Secondary School, Kildare Town, a convent school. She studied French and philosophy at Trinity College Dublin. While there, she was an active member of the drama society, and part of a student sketch comedy group. She then studied at the London Academy of Music and Dramatic Art (LAMDA). She has said she did not enjoy this experience, but that it has helped with her comedy.

== Career ==
After graduating from drama school, Bea spent two years trying to get work in theatre as a dramatic actress. Instead, she was cast mainly in comedic television series including Cardinal Burns and Sharon Horgan's Dead Boss (both 2012). While filming Dead Boss in 2011, Bea decided to try stand-up comedy. In 2012, she was the first woman in 20 years (and only the second in its history) to win the Gilded Balloon So You Think You're Funny award at the Edinburgh Festival Fringe. In 2013, she was nominated for Best Newcomer at the Edinburgh Comedy Awards for her show C'est La Bea.

The exposure brought by these awards and festival appearances marked a "turning point" in Bea's career and she began to appear as a regular guest on panel shows including QI and Insert Name Here. Bea and Yasmine Akram co-wrote and co-hosted the BBC Radio 4 comedy folklore series Micks and Legends (2012, 2015); it was nominated for a Chortle Award in 2013. Bea won the 2014 British Comedy Award for Best Female TV Comic, and returned to Edinburgh in 2015 with the live show Plan Bea. In 2015, she presented Channel 4's alternative election coverage with David Mitchell and Jeremy Paxman. In 2016, she became a team captain on 8 Out of 10 Cats and was a contestant on series 5 of Taskmaster in 2017.

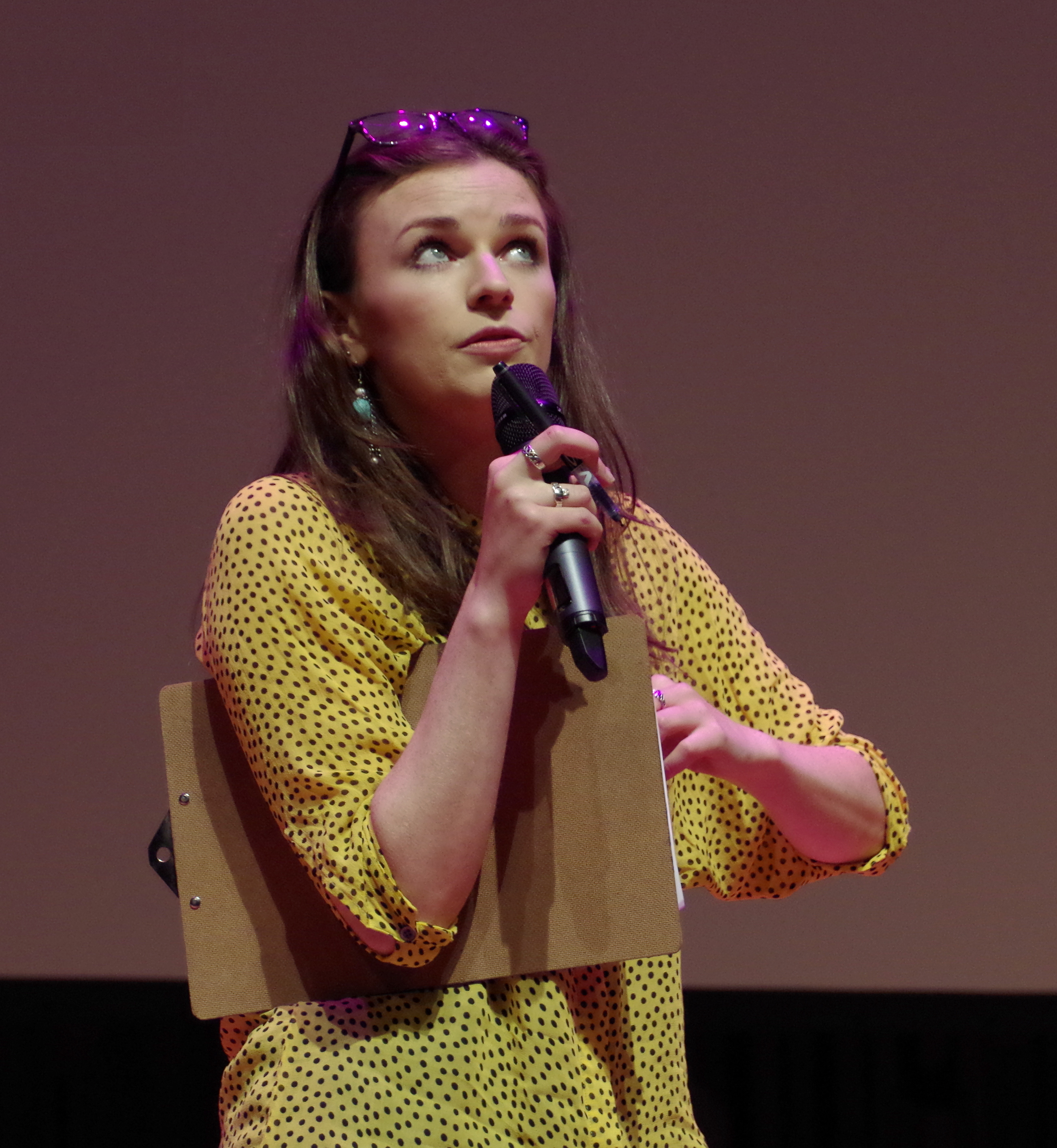
Bea in 2014

Bea has continued to act in television sitcoms including Trollied (2014–2015), The Delivery Man (2015), Amy Huberman's Irish television series Finding Joy (2018), and Living with Yourself (2019). She acted in the crime dramas The Fall (2016) and Hard Sun (2018), She starred in the ITV drama series Quiz (2020) based on the true story of the Who Wants to be a Millionaire coughing scandal.

In 2018, she and Sara Pascoe began to co-host the BBC Radio 2 comedy chat show What's Normal? She recorded a 15-minute stand-up special that was released on Netflix in late 2018.

Bea wrote and starred in the Channel 4 comedy series This Way Up (2019–2021). For her writing, she won the BAFTA 2020 British Academy Television Craft Award for Breakthrough Talent. In 2022, she also received a nomination for British Academy Television Award for Best Female Comedy Performance for the series.

In January 2024, Bea was one of 10 comedians in Amazon Prime Video's LOL: Last One Laughing Ireland.

== Personal life ==
Bea previously dated Michael Sheen and Andrew Garfield. In June 2024, Bea announced that she was expecting her first child, with her partner Jack Freeman. Their daughter was born in late August 2024.

Bea is close to fellow comedians Roisin Conaty, Katherine Ryan, and Sharon Horgan, calling them her "comedy sisters".

Bea lives in London.

Bea has ADHD.

In May 2025, Bea appeared on Who Do You Think You Are and found out that her great-great-grandmother, Áine O’Donoghue, was the first teacher on the Blasket Islands.

== Activism ==
Bea was a vocal supporter of the Repeal the 8th campaign in the successful 2018 Irish referendum to introduce legal abortion in the Republic of Ireland; she contributed an essay to Una Mullally's Repeal the 8th a month before the vote. She previously campaigned for same-sex marriage legislation in the successful 2015 Irish referendum.

She frequently shares posts about the humanitarian situation in Palestine. In 2024, Bea participated in the Cinema for Gaza auction, and was a signatory calling for the end of arms sales to Israel. In September 2025, she signed an open pledge with Film Workers for Palestine pledging not to work with Israeli film institutions "that are implicated in genocide and apartheid against the Palestinian people."

== Filmography ==
=== Acting ===
==== Television ====
Year	Title	Role	Channel	Notes	Ref.
2009	Fair City	Cliodhna Norris	RTÉ One	3 episodes	
2009	We Are Klang	Inspector	BBC Three	1 episode	
2009	The Roy Files	Ticket girl (voice)	TRTÉ and RTÉ TWO (Ireland), CBBC (UK)	Episode: "Truth and Lies"	
2009	Belonging to Laura	Leanne Thompson	TV3/BAI	Television film	
2009–2014	The Savage Eye	Various	RTE	4 episodes	
2010	Inn Mates	Elf	BBC Three	Pilot	
2010	L.O.L	Various	BBC	Pilot; also writer	
2010	Freedom	Aisling	BBC Two	Pilot	
2010	Come Fly with Me	Mary O'Mara	BBC One	1 episode	
2011	Lewis	Hotel receptionist	ITV	1 episode	
2011	Holby City	Amelia Warner	BBC One	1 episode	
2012	Cardinal Burns	Sally	E4	5 episodes	
2012	Dead Boss	Laura Stephens	BBC Three	6 episodes	
2012	In with the Flynns	Naimah	BBC One	1 episode	
2012	The Town	Carly	ITV	3 episodes	
2012	Trivia	Ruth		6 episodes	
2013	Fit	Various	CBBC	13 episodes	
2013	Quick Cuts	Customer	BBC Four	1 episode	
2014	Playhouse Presents	Toddler Woman	Sky Arts	1 episode	
2014	The Assets	Kara Jensen	ABC	1 episode	
2014	Vodka Diaries	Nic	BBC Three	Pilot	
2014	The Sunny	Emma	BBC Two	Pilot	
2014–2015	Trollied	Charlie	Sky One	13 episodes	
2015	Funny Valentines	Sarah	BBC iPlayer	2 episodes	
2015	The Delivery Man	Lisa	ITV	6 episodes	
2015	Nish Kumar's Christmas	Agent	Sky Arts	Comedy short	
2016	Damned	Anne-Marie	Channel 4	1 episode	
2016	The Fall	Kiera Sheridan	ZDFneo (Germany), RTÉ One (Ireland), BBC Two (UK)	4 episodes	
2017	Drunk History	Guinevere	Comedy Central	1 episode	
2017	Travel Man	self	E2: "Budapest"	1 episode	
2017	Gap Year	Kendra	E4	2 episodes	
2017	Taskmaster	Series 5 contestant	Dave	8 episodes	
2018	Hard Sun	Mari Butler	BBC One (UK), Hulu (US)	5 episodes	
2018	Plebs	Minerva	ITV2	1 episode	
2018	I Feel Bad	Simone	NBC	1 episode	
2018	Finding Joy	Amelia	ITV	6 episodes	
2019	State of the Union	Anna	BBC (UK), Sundance TV (US)	Episode: "Plaster Cast"	
2019	Living with Yourself	Kate Elliot	Netflix	8 episodes	
2019–2021	This Way Up	Aine	Channel 4	12 episodes; also writer, executive producer	
2020	Quiz	Claudia Rosencrantz	ITV	3 episodes	
2021–2022	Amphibia	Captain Beatrix (voice)	Disney Channel (US)	3 episodes	
2022	Doctor Who	Sarah	BBC	Episode: "Eve of the Daleks"	
2023–2024	Avoidance	Megan	BBC One	Season 2	
2024	Alice & Jack	Lynn	Channel 4 (UK), PBS (US)	Miniseries	
Upcoming	Grown Ups	Cara	Netflix		

==== Film ====
Year	Title	Role	Notes	Ref
2013	Tattooed	Eve	Short film	
2013	Very Few Fish	Gráinne	Short film	
2015	The Trap	Marie		
2016	Bullet to the Heart	Jane	Short film; co-writer	
2020	Love Wedding Repeat	Rebecca	Rom-com	
2021	Home Sweet Home Alone	Carol Mercer		
2021	Riverdance: The Animated Adventure	Margot (voice)	Animated film	
2023	Greatest Days	Rachel		
2024	Swede Caroline	Louise		
2024	And Mrs	Gemma		
2024	Get Away	Susan		
TBA	Hello & Paris	TBA	Filming	
TBA	Starman	Julia Hanley	Filming	

==== Radio ====
Year	Title	Station	Role	Notes	Ref
2012, 2015	Micks and Legends	BBC Radio 4	Co-host	Also co-writer; with Yasmine Akram	
2014	The Architects	BBC Radio 4	Hayley (voice)	4 episodes	

==== Video games ====
Year	Title	Publisher	Role	Ref.
2012	Assassin's Creed III	Ubisoft	Emily Burke (voice)	
2013	Soul Sacrifice	Sony Computer Entertainment	Similia (voice)	

=== Stand-up comedy ===
Year	Title	Channel	Venue	Ref.
2009	Sabotage	BBC Radio 4 Extra	Live at Hoxton Hall	
2009	Fresh From the Fringe	BBC Radio 4	Edinburgh Festival Fringe	
2013	C'est La Bea		Gilded Balloon, Edinburgh Festival Fringe	
2013	C'est La Bea		Galway	
2013	Seann Walsh's Late Night Comedy Spectacular	BBC Three	Edinburgh Festival Fringe	
2013	Russell Howard's Good News	BBC Three	Riverside Studios	
2013	Set List	Nerdist Channel		
2014	C'est La Bea		Soho Theatre, London	
2014	Live at the Apollo	BBC One	Hammersmith Apollo	
2014–2016	Channel 4's Comedy Gala	Channel 4	O2 Arena	
2015	Plan Bea		Edinburgh Festival Fringe	
2018	Netflix Comedy Lineup	Netflix		
2026	Older Than Jesus		UK and Ireland tour	

=== Panel show appearances ===
From 2016 to 2017, Bea was a team captain (the first female captain on the show) on 8 Out of 10 Cats, having previously been a guest on the show in 2013 and 2014. Her guest appearances on other panel shows include:

- Have You Been Paying Attention? (2024)
- RuPaul's Drag Race UK (Series 4 in 2022, Series 5 in 2023)
- I Literally Just Told You (2021)
- Sunday Brunch (2021)
- Have I Got News for You (2021)
- QI (2015, 2016, 2017, 2018, 2019, 2020, 2021, 2025)
- Richard Osman's House of Games (2020)
- Insert Name Here (2016, 2018)
- Taskmaster (2017)
- The Big Fat Quiz of the Year (2016, 2017)
- @midnight (2016, 2017)
- The Last Leg (2016, 2017, 2018, 2019, 2020, 2021, 2023)
- Word of the Year 2017 (2017)
- 8 Out of 10 Cats Does Countdown (2014, 2015, 2016, 2019)
- A League of Their Own (2015, 2016)
- Room 101 (2016)
- The Unbelievable Truth (2016)
- It's Not What You Know (2016)
- Very British Problems (2015, 2016)
- Duck Quacks Don't Echo (2015)
- Jack Dee's HelpDesk (2015)
- Alan Davies: As Yet Untitled (2015)
- Listomania (2015)
- Would I Lie to You? (2015)
- Channel 4's Alternative Election Night (2015)
- Celebrity Squares (2014, 2015)
- This Week (2014)
- Don't Make Me Laugh (2014)
- Virtually Famous (2014)
- Never Mind the Buzzcocks (2014)
- Don't Sit In The Front Row (2013)
- The Guessing Game (2013)
- Bad Language (2013)
- Sweat the Small Stuff (2013)

== Awards and nominations ==
Year	Award	Category	Work	Result	Ref.
2012	Edinburgh Festival Fringe	Gilded Balloon So You Think You're Funny award		Won	
2013	Edinburgh Comedy Awards	Best Newcomer	C'est La Bea	Nominated	
2014	British Comedy Award	Best Female Television Comic		Won	
2020	BAFTA TV Craft Awards	Best Breakthrough Talent	This Way Up	Won	
2020	Royal Television Society Programme Awards	Breakthrough Award	This Way Up	Nominated	
2021	Writers' Guild of Great Britain	Best TV Situation Comedy	This Way Up - "Episode #2.4"	Nominated	
2022	BAFTA TV Awards	Female Performance in a TV Comedy	This Way Up	Nominated	
2022	NME Awards 2022	Best TV Actor		Won	
2024	National Film Awards UK	Best Supporting Actress	Swede Caroline	Nominated	
2026	Spirit of Kildare Awards	Contribution to the Arts		Won	
