= Siobhán Ní Shúilleabháin =

Irish dramatist and writer (1928–2013)

- Born: 31 August 1928; Imileá near Ballyferriter, County Kerry, Ireland
- Died: 21 May 2013 (aged 84); Galway, County Galway, Ireland
- Other name: Siobhán Henry
- Education: Carysfort College
- Spouse: Patrick Leo Henry (m. 1955; died 2011)
- Children: 6
- Relatives: Mícheál Ó Súilleabháin (brother); Aisling Bea (great-niece)
- Writing career
- Language: Irish; English
- Years active: 1955–2004

Siobhán Ní Shúilleabháin (married name Henry; 31 August 1928 – 21 May 2013) was an Irish dramatist, writer and educator.

== Early life and education ==
Ní Shúilleabháin was born on 31 August 1928 in Imileá near Ballyferriter, County Kerry to the farmers Séamus Ó Súilleabháin and Máire Feiritéar. The fifth of six siblings, Ní Shúilleabháin was the younger sister of the writer Mícheál Ó Súilleabháin.

Winning a scholarship to Coláiste Íde Boarding School, an Irish language school in Dingle, Ní Shúilleabháin was awarded a gold medal for art in her Intermediate Certificate examination. Ní Shúilleabháin subsequently attended Carysfort College, where she trained to be a teacher.

== Career ==
From 1948 to 1952, Ní Shúilleabháin taught at a national school in Cabra. Later employed by the Department of Education, Ní Shúilleabháin worked for three years under Tomás de Bhaldraithe on the creation of the English-Irish Dictionary.

Ní Shúilleabháin began her writing career in the early 1950s, publishing Triúr Againn in 1955. The same year Ní Shúilleabháin married the academic Patrick Leo Henry (died 2011), with whom she had 6 children. In 1960, the couple moved to Belfast where Ní Shúilleabháin worked part-time at the Queen's University Belfast in the Celtic department Following her husband's appointment as a professor at National University of Ireland Galway in 1969, Ní Shúilleabháin began working part-time in the Irish department.

John B. Keane called her the "best dramatist writing in Ireland". Ní Shúilleabháin was the winner of the Irish Life award for plays in 1974, and of thirty Oireachtas literary awards. Her novel Aistriú (2004) led Pól Ó Muirí to write, "[It] is a work of great compassion and poignancy and Ní Shúilleabháin tells the story fluently. Her use of dialogue is particularly impressive, giving the reader the immediate sense of what is said but, magically, also conveying a second meaning behind the spoken one. It is the sound of speech and the whisper of a sigh that adds so much to a wonderful novel."

== Personal life ==
Through her brother Mícheál, Ní Shúilleabháin was the great-aunt of the comedian and actress Aisling Bea. On 21 May 2013, Ní Shúilleabháin died in Galway.

== Selected works ==
=== Children's books ===
- Triúr Againn, 1955
- Mé Féin agus Síle, 1978
- Rósanna sa Gháirdín, 1994

=== Novels ===
- Ospidéal, 1980
- Aistriú, 2004

=== Plays ===
- Cití, 1975
- Madge agus Martha, 1976
- Is Tú mo Mhac, 1990

=== Plays for television ===
- Saolaíodh Gamhain, 1971
- An Carabhan, 1972
- Teacht agus Imeacht

=== Poetry ===
- Cnuasach Trá, 2000
