= Kirsty Capes =

- Born: 1993 (age 32–33); Chertsey, England
- Education: Brunel University London
- Years active: 2017–present

Kirsty Capes (born 1993) is an English contemporary novelist and publishing marketer. She is best known for her debut novel Careless (2021), written about the care system.

== Early life ==
Capes was born in Chertsey, Surrey near Shepperton. At age two, she and her older brother were placed in foster care and subsequently raised by the Capes family.

Capes attended Thamesmead School and completed her A Levels at Strode's College. She graduated with a Bachelor of Arts (BA) in Creative Writing in 2014, Master of Arts (MA) in 2015 and PhD in 2019, all from Brunel University London. Her PhD, written on "Marxist-feminist readings of contemporary fiction", was supervised by Bernadine Evaristo.

== Career ==
Capes began her career working in marketing and publishing. She joined HarperCollins as a Marketing Manager in 2019 for the Mills & Boon imprint.

Under the working title The Hatchling, as a 2017 WriteNow mentee and during her PhD, Capes developed her debut novel, partly inspired by her own experiences in the care system. In 2020, Orion Publishing Group acquired the rights to publish Capes' debut novel titled Careless in 2021. Ahead of its publication, Neal Street Productions optioned the novel for adaptation. Careless was longlisted for the 2022 Women's Prize for Fiction and the Ondaatje Prize, while the audiobook version was shortlisted for a British Book Award.

Capes reunited with Orion for the publication of her second and third novels Love Me, Love Me Not in 2022 and Girls in 2024 respectively.

== Personal life ==
Capes has spoken out against transphobia and other issues in the publishing and bookselling industry.

== Bibliography ==
=== Novels ===
- Careless (2021)
- Love Me, Love Me Not (2022)
- Girls (2024) (published as Daughters in the U.S.)
