= This Way Up (TV series) =

British comedy-drama television series

- Publicity image
- Genre: Black comedy; Comedy drama; Sitcom
- Created by: Aisling Bea
- Written by: Aisling Bea
- Directed by: Alex Winckler
- Starring: Aisling Bea; Sharon Horgan; Tobias Menzies; Aasif Mandvi
- Country of origin: United Kingdom
- Original language: English
- No. of seasons: 2
- No. of episodes: 12

Production
- Executive producers: Clelia Mountford; Sharon Horgan; Aisling Bea
- Producer: Gavin O’Grady
- Production company: Merman

Original release
- Network: Channel 4
- Release: 8 August 2019 – 9 July 2021

This Way Up is a British comedy-drama television series broadcast on Channel 4. It is set in London, and is written by and stars Aisling Bea. Sharon Horgan, who co-stars in the series, is an executive producer and story consultant.

The first season was shown in 2019, and the second in 2021. In 2024, Bea announced that there would not be a third season. The series is distributed in the United States on Hulu.

== Premise ==
In This Way Up Bea plays a young, single Irish woman, Áine (/ˈɔːnjə/), who lives in London and is recovering from a nervous breakdown. She works as a teacher of English as a second language. Horgan plays Áine's protective elder sister, Shona, who lives with her male partner but is also sexually attracted to a female colleague.

== Cast ==
=== Main ===
- Aisling Bea as Áine
- Sharon Horgan as Shona, Áine's sister
- Dorian Grover as Étienne, Áine's French pupil
- Tobias Menzies as Richard, Étienne's father
- Aasif Mandvi as Vish, Shona's partner
- Indira Varma as Charlotte, Shona's colleague
- Kadiff Kirwan as Bradley, Áine's flatmate

=== Recurring ===
- Chris Geere as Freddie, Áine's ex-boyfriend
- Ricky Grover as Tom, Áine's friend from rehab
- Ekow Quartey as James, Áine's boss
- Pik-Sen Lim as Chien, one of Áine's students
- Ambreen Razia as Emma, Bradley's girlfriend

=== Guest ===
- Sorcha Cusack as Eileen, Áine and Shona's mother
- Lou Sanders as Fran, a psychic Áine visits
- Jeff Mirza as Hari, Vish's father
- Soni Razdan as Kavita, Vish's mother
- Chetna Pandya as Seema, Vish's sister
- Nikhil Parmar as Anil, Vish's brother
- Tom Bell as David, Áine and Shona's Cousin

== Episodes ==
Series	Episodes	Originally released	
Series	Episodes	First released	Last released
1	6	8 August 2019	12 September 2019
2	6	9 July 2021	

=== Season 1 (2019) ===
No. overall	No. in season	Title	Directed by	Written by	Original release date	U.K viewers (millions)
1	1	"Episode 1"	Alex Winkler	Aisling Bea	8 August 2019	N/A
Áine leaves a rehabilitation centre in Archway, north London, where she is met by her sister Shona. The sisters are disappointed with the centre due to its lack of facilities and most of the residents having substance use disorders in comparison to the nervous breakdown that Áine had. Four months later, Áine has returned to teaching a class of adult English-language learners. She tells Shona that she will join her at a party. However, after Shona leaves, Áine stays at her flat for a bit, before going home, where she invites Tom, who had been in rehabilitation with her & to whom she is not sexually attracted. She tries to initiate sex with him, which he rejects. He misses the last train home and shares her bed, annoying her with his snoring.
2	2	"Episode 2"	Alex Winkler	Aisling Bea	15 August 2019	N/A
Áine's manager James assigns her to tutor a 12-year-old French boy, Étienne, at his house. Étienne needs to learn English after having moved from France to England to live with his father Richard (whom he had not previously known) a month ago because Étienne's mother died. James asks Áine to visit him at his house to introduce herself before their first lesson at 5 pm the following day, which she does. One of Áine's students, a young Bulgarian man called Victor, arrives to her class with a moderate cut on his head. After wrongly assuming it to have been caused by a xenophobic attack, Áine takes him to the hospital. While there, she talks to a Bulgarian nurse who translates what Victor says, which is that his injury was caused by a falling brick from the building site which he was working on. Áine's trip to the hospital causes her to be late for her lesson with Étienne, which he and Richard are disappointed by. She arranges with Richard for the lesson to take place there at 5 pm the following day.
3	3	"Episode 3"	Alex Winkler	Aisling Bea	22 August 2019	N/A
Áine briefly visits Richard and Étienne, arranging the next lesson for Monday. She then goes to Shona's flat, where Shona's partner Vish becomes annoyed at the sisters' conversation as they sit on either side of him on the sofa. Áine tells Shona that there are rats in her flat and stays at Shona's while they are killed and removed. Áine goes to a psychic medium. Shona tells Áine that they are going to meet a male cousin of theirs to please their mother. She also tells Áine that she is going to set Áine up on a blind date, despite Áine's reluctance. Shona tells Áine to meet her and Charlotte in the pub. She arrives and sees that they are accompanied by a young man, David, whom Áine assumes to be her date. Shona and Charlotte go to Shona's, leaving Áine and David in the pub. He takes Áine to the café which is below his flat. She finds him boring, but kisses him before telling him that she does not want to see him again. While walking home, she sees her drunken elderly neighbour, Pat, and brings him back to Shona's. Shona is angry with her for doing so. Áine is horrified when she finds out from Shona that David is their cousin rather than her date.
4	4	"Episode 4"	Alex Winkler	Aisling Bea	29 August 2019	N/A
Áine and Shona's mother – who lives in Ireland – visits them. The women join Vish and his family to celebrate his father's birthday. Shona is annoyed by the conversation including pressure being put on her to have children (mostly by her mother); Shona tells everyone there that she has never wanted to become a mother.
5	5	"Episode 5"	Alex Winkler	Aisling Bea	5 September 2019	N/A
Áine's ex-boyfriend Freddie texts her and they meet in a bar. She goes home, where she talks to her flatmate Bradley, his sister and a friend of his. The group go to a nightclub, where Áine sees Tom; she is disappointed that he is drinking again. An argument breaks out between all of them, and Áine leaves alone in a taxi and goes to Freddie's flat. After waking up with him in his bed, she goes to Richard and Étienne's house.
6	6	"Episode 6"	Alex Winkler	Aisling Bea	12 September 2019	N/A
Áine makes a cake for Richard and gives it to him on his 46th birthday. She is disappointed, soon after she arrives, to see he has a female acquaintance, Barbara, with him. Áine has sex with Freddie and he tells her that he is attached. Afterwards, he asks her if she was in rehab a few months ago, saying that Charlotte told him. Vish proposes to Shona, which she rejects. Áine is flashed by a stranger as she walks to Shona's. She tells Shona that she is angry with her for telling Charlotte about her rehab stay and for not telling her that Freddie is no longer single. Shona is angry with Áine for not telling her that Vish was intending to propose to her, for having sex with Freddie and for trying to kill herself months ago. Shona publicly accepts the proposal, then in private kisses Charlotte. Richard tells Áine that Barbara is a social worker. Áine visits her counsellor.

=== Season 2 (2021) ===
No. overall	No. in season	Title	Directed by	Written by	Original release date	U.K viewers (millions)
7	1	"Episode 1"	Alex Winckler	Aisling Bea	9 July 2021	N/A
Áine and Richard have sex together on their first date. Shona struggles to settle into her new house while her fiancé Vish is working in New York.
8	2	"Episode 2"	Alex Winckler	Aisling Bea	9 July 2021	N/A
Principal James suggests to Áine that they open a new language school together. She is disappointed when Richard loses his erection during sex and does not ejaculate, which she tells Shona about. The sisters shop for wedding dresses. Charlotte is angry with Shona for ending their relationship in favour of a heterosexual life with Vish; she tells Shona that she is in a new lesbian relationship. Shona and Vish enjoy mutual masturbation via webcam, during which she fantasises about having sex with Charlotte.
9	3	"Episode 3"	Alex Winckler	Aisling Bea	9 July 2021	N/A
Áine's keen to spice things up with Richard, so she roleplays a lap dancer. She is disappointed by Shona's lack of support for her planned language school.
10	4	"Episode 4"	Alex Winckler	Aisling Bea	9 July 2021	N/A
Áine helps Bradley at a fundraiser, but there are consequences when Richard unexpectedly turns up. Vish meets with his ex-wife in New York.
11	5	"Episode 5"	Alex Winckler	Aisling Bea	9 July 2021	N/A
Vish drops a bombshell on Shona at her hen do. Áine meets Richard's friend Mark, but it doesn't go to plan. Shona and Charlotte build bridges after a car-crash interview.
12	6	"Episode 6"	Alex Winckler	Aisling Bea	9 July 2021	N/A
The approach of the first Covid lockdown casts a shadow. A tragic loss has lasting repercussions, and Áine's friendship with Bradley is stronger than ever. Shona prepares for Vish to come home.

== Reception ==
On Rotten Tomatoes, season 1 has an approval rating of 90% based on reviews from 20 critics. The site's consensus describes the show as "Devastating, hilarious, and surprisingly light, This Way Up captures the complexities of mental health with an empathetic – if at times wandering – eye." Bustle compared it positively with Fleabag. It also gained comparisons with Back to Life and Catastrophe. The Daily Telegraph called This Way Up "one of the best new shows of the year", awarding it five stars. In The Hollywood Reporter, Daniel Fienberg was less positive, but called it a "solid and familiar blend of comic and melancholic". Sophie Gilbert in The Atlantic praised the show, calling it "small in scope, infinitely charming, and intermittently devastating".

At the 2020 BAFTA Television Craft Awards, Bea won the Breakthrough Talent Award and in 2022 was nominated for Best Female Comedy Performance at the British Academy Television Awards.
