= Portmarnock Community School =

- Pobalscoil Phortmearnóg

Location
- Portmarnock; Ireland
- 53.432°N 6.138°W

Information
- Type: Public
- Motto: Vitam Impendere Vero (Latin for "to stake one’s life for the truth")
- Established: 1979
- Principal: Helen Tobin
- Gender: Mixed
- Age: 12 to 19
- Enrollment: 915 (2019)
- Campus: Suburban
Colour
- Website: portmarnockcommunityschool.ie

Portmarnock Community School (Irish: Pobalscoil Phortmearnóg) is a public secondary school situated in Portmarnock, County Dublin. It was built by the Department of Education in 1979, and was one of the first community schools built in Ireland. As of 2019, the school had an enrollment of over 900 students.

== Notable alumni ==
- Vincent May, drums, Kodaline
- Jeremy McConnell, Irish model and reality TV star
- Ryan O'Shaughnessy, singer/songwriter
- Stephen Ward (footballer)
