= Community school (Ireland) =

Type of secondary school in Ireland

A community school (Irish: pobalscoil) in Ireland is a type of secondary school funded individually and directly by the state. Community and comprehensive schools were established in the 1960s to provide a broad curriculum for all the young people in a community. Both academic and vocational programmes are available and facilities are broader than at voluntary or vocational schools. The facilities are for use by the community and adult education in addition to normal programmes of education at this level.

Many of these schools were established as the result of an amalgamation of voluntary secondary and vocational schools. They offer a wide range of both academic and vocational subjects. Community schools are managed by boards of management which are representative of local interests. The schools are financed entirely by the Department of Education and Skills. The representative body for these schools is the Association of Community and Comprehensive Schools.

== List of community schools in Ireland ==
- Ardee Community School
- Ashbourne Community School
- Athboy Community School
- Bailieborough Community School
- Ballinamore Community School
- Balincollig Community School
- Ballinrobe Community School
- Ballinteer Community School
- Ballyhaunis Community School
- Beara Community School
- Beaufort Community School
- Bishopstown Community School
- Blackwater Community School
- Blakestown Community School
- Boyne Community School
- Cabintreely Community School
- Carndonagh Community School
- Carrigaline Community School
- Cashel Community School
- Castlerea Community School
- Celbridge Community School
- Douglas Community School
- Dunmore Community School
- Gallen Community School
- Glanamaddy Community School
- Glanmire Community School
- Gorey Community School
- Gort Community School
- Hartstown Community School
- Heywood Community School
- Holy Child Community School
- Holy Family Community School
- John the Baptist Community School
- Kildare Town Community School
- Killinarden Community School
- Kilrush Community School
- Kinsale Community School
- Leixlip Community School
- Loreto Community School
- Malahide Community School
- Mayfield Community School
- Millstreet Community School
- Moate Community School
- Mountmellick Community School
- Mountrath Community School
- Moyne Community School
- Old Bawn Community School
- Portmarnock Community School
- Portumna Community School
- Ramsgrange Community School
- Roscommon Community School
- Rosmini Community School
- Rosses Community School
- Scoil Mhuire Community School
- Skibbereen Community School
- St Aidan's Community School
- St Attracta's Community School
- St. Caimin's Community School
- St Ciaran's Community School
- St Louis Community School
- St Marks Community School
- St Peter's Community School
- St Wolstan's Community School
- St. Kilian's Community School
- St. Tiernan's Community School
- St. Brendan's Community School
- Tallaght Community School
- The Donahies Community School
- Tullow Community School
- Kenmare Community School

== See also ==
- Education in the Republic of Ireland
