= St Wolstan's Community School =

St. Wolstan's Community School
- Pobalscoil Naomh Bholstan

Location
- Clane Road, Celbridge, County Kildare; W23 RKA9; Republic of Ireland; 53.3343°N 6.5621°W

Information
- Religious affiliation: Roman Catholic
- Established: August 1955
- Principal: Francis Carolan
- Staff: 50 teachers
- Gender: female
- Enrollment: 750
- Campus size: 9.5 ha (23 ac)
- Campus type: Urban
- Colours: wine, green
- Nickname: Wollie Wollie Wolstans
- Website: stwolstans.ie

St. Wolstan's Community School is an all-female community school in Celbridge, County Kildare, Ireland. It's under the trusteeship of the Catholic Archbishop of Dublin, the Holy Faith Sisters and Kildare and Wicklow Education and Training Board. It is the only all-girls community school in Ireland.

== History ==
St. Wolstan's Priory was founded between 1202 and 1205 by Adam de Hereford and named after Saint Wolstan (also spelled Wulfstan; died 1095). The monastery was dissolved in 1536 and when the Holy Faith Sisters opened a girls' school on the site (located south of Castletown House) in 1955 they revived the name: St. Wolstan's Holy Faith Convent School. The school moved to its present site in Ballymakealy Upper in 1999. In 2024 it the school is set to build an extension
