= Stephen Ward (footballer) =

Irish footballer

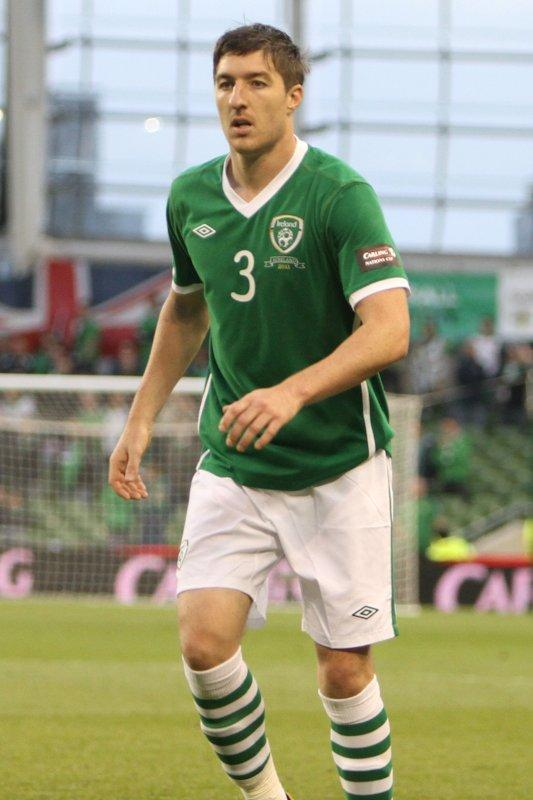
- Ward playing for the Republic of Ireland at the 2011 Nations Cup

Personal information
- Full name: Stephen Robert Ward
- Date of birth: 20 August 1985 (age 41)
- Place of birth: Dublin, Ireland
- Height: 5 ft 11 in (1.80 m)
- Positions: Left-back; winger

Team information
- Current team: Dubai Irish (Head of Football Development)

Youth career
- Home Farm
- Portmarnock

Senior career*
Years	Team	Apps	(Gls)
2003–2007	Bohemians	74	(11)
2007–2014	Wolverhampton Wanderers	222	(9)
2013–2014	→ Brighton & Hove Albion (loan)	44	(4)
2014–2019	Burnley	101	(3)
2019–2020	Stoke City	15	(0)
2020–2021	Ipswich Town	30	(0)
2021–2022	Walsall	27	(0)
Total		513	(27)

International career
2003–2004	Republic of Ireland U19	5	(3)
2005–2008	Republic of Ireland U21	13	(4)
2007	Republic of Ireland B	1	(0)
2011–2018	Republic of Ireland	50	(3)
- * Club domestic league appearances and goals

Stephen Robert Ward (born 20 August 1985) is an Irish retired professional footballer who played as a left-back. He is currently Head of Football Development at UAE Third Division League club Dubai Irish.

Ward began his senior career with Bohemians in his native Ireland, before moving to English Championship side Wolverhampton Wanderers in 2007. Featuring regularly, he was part of their promotion to the Premier League two years later and played over 230 times for the club. Following consecutive relegation's though he was transfer listed and after spending the 2013–14 season on loan at Brighton & Hove Albion he eventually left to return to the Premier League with Burnley in 2014. He spent five seasons at Turf Moor making 113 appearances for the Clarets before joining Stoke City in June 2019. Following the end of his contract at Stoke City, Ward signed for Ipswich Town in August 2020. He spent one season at Ipswich before being released and joining Walsall in July 2021.

From 2011 until his retirement from international football in March 2019, he had been a regular member of the Republic of Ireland's international squads, and played at UEFA Euro 2012 and UEFA Euro 2016.

== Club career ==
=== Bohemians ===
Born in Dublin, Ireland, Ward grew up in Portmarnock where he attended St Helen's Primary School and Portmarnock Community School. Ward played schoolboy football for Home Farm and Portmarnock before joining Dublin-based League of Ireland side Bohemians in the summer of 2003. He scored twice on his debut as a substitute against Skerries Town in the FAI Cup on 15 August 2003. Ward played as a forward for Bohemians before converting to a left-back. His form in Ireland attracted interest from various English sides including Sunderland and Wolverhampton Wanderers. The 2006 season with Bohemians ended up being his last and he made a total of 93 appearances for the club, scoring 26 times.

=== Wolverhampton Wanderers ===
After a successful trial, Ward joined English Championship side Wolverhampton Wanderers in January 2007 on a two-and-a-half-year deal. The fee, although undisclosed, was reported to be £100,000.

Ward had a bright start to English football scoring three times in his first six games, earning him the Championship Player of the Month Award for February 2007; his first goal came against Plymouth Argyle on 3 February. He featured in all of Wolves remaining 2006–07 fixtures as they reached the play-offs where they lost 4–2 on aggregate to Black Country rivals West Bromwich Albion. The next season was less successful for Ward as he was mostly used in an unfamiliar left midfield role, covering for the injured Matt Jarvis, but announced he was happy to play anywhere. Later on in the season, Ward himself also suffered injury woes as he was struck down with patellar tendinitis that ruled him out for four months. He played 31 times in 2007–08 as the team narrowly missed a second successive play-off spot finishing in 7th position.

The 2008–09 season again saw Ward adopt a new position as he was converted to a makeshift left-back, after George Elokobi sustained knee damage in only the third game of the campaign. Despite the emergency purchase of natural full back Matt Hill, Ward was often preferred in the spot anyway. Ward only missed four Championship matches helping Wolves win the title and earn promotion to the Premier League.

Ward began the club's return to the top flight in the left-back role, but he soon suffered a cartilage injury that kept him out of action for two months. Returning in December 2009 he was sent-off by Andre Marriner against Liverpool a decision which angered manager Mick McCarthy. Ward made a total of 22 league appearances in 2009–10 as the club managed to avoid an immediate return to the second tier, finishing in 15th. At the end of the campaign Ward signed a contract extension with Wolves.

During the 2010–11 season, Ward filled a variety of roles, playing left-back, left midfield and as a striker. One game up front saw him net his first Premier League goal, when he scored the only goal of the game against Liverpool at Anfield on 29 December 2010. He was part of the team that avoided relegation on the final day of the season as results went their way after a 3–2 defeat at home to Blackburn Rovers. Ward played 41 times in 2011–12 as Wolves suffered relegation to the Championship, finishing bottom of the table. Ward scored Wolves' first goal back in the Championship a 3–1 win against Barnsley on 20 August 2012. However Wolves would go on to have another poor campaign in 2012–13, suffering a second successive relegation.

==== Loan to Brighton & Hove Albion ====
After Wolves suffered a second consecutive relegation to enter League One in 2013, Ward was one of a group of players made available for transfer by the club's new head coach Kenny Jackett. On 16 August 2013, Ward was loaned to Brighton & Hove Albion for the 2013–14 season, where he made 47 appearances as the club reached the play-offs but were defeated at the semi-final stage by Derby County. Brighton then agreed to a permanent deal with Wolves for Ward over the close season, but interest from the Premier League halted the move.

=== Burnley ===
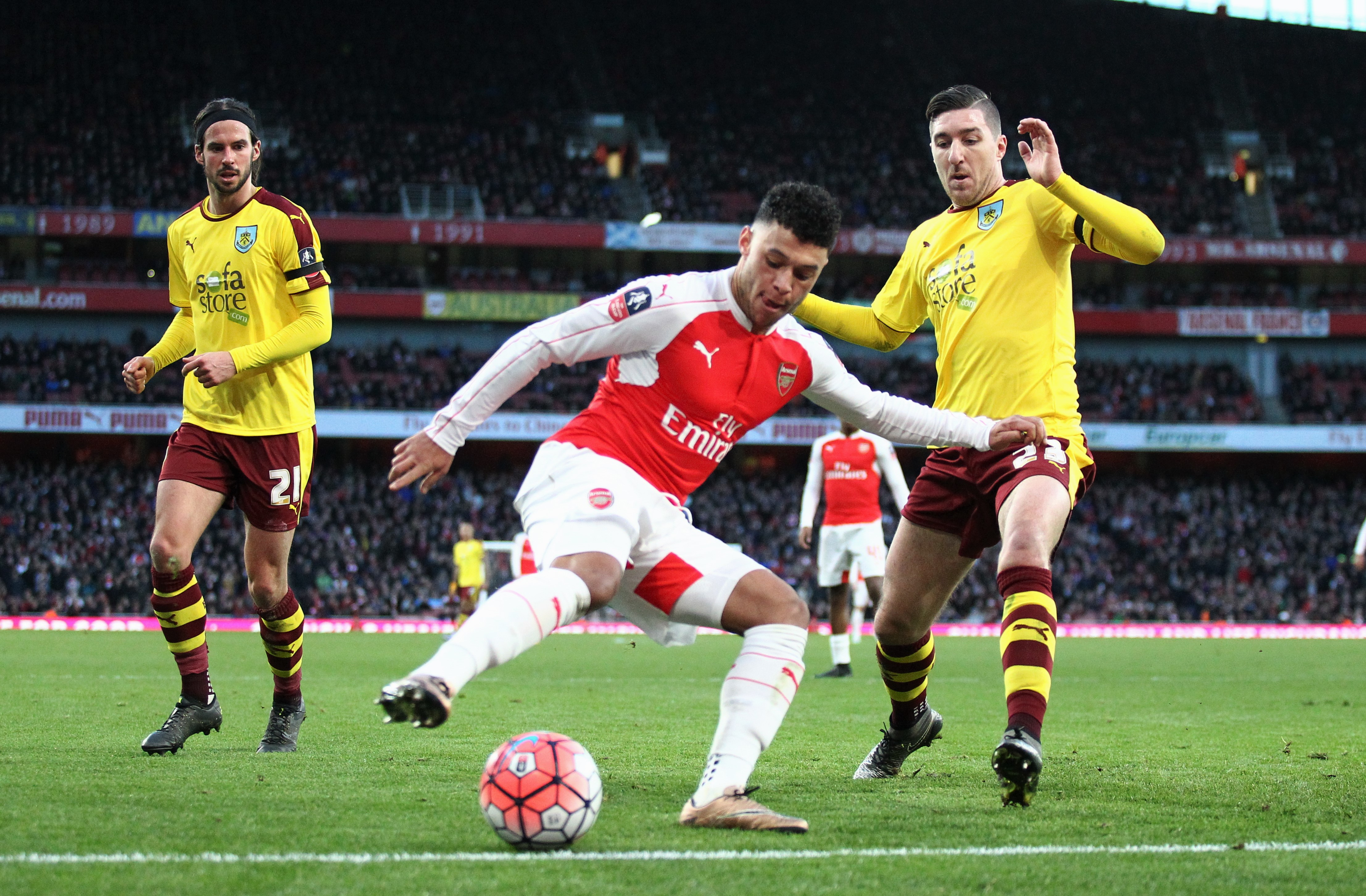
Ward (right) playing for Burnley in 2016

On 15 August 2014, Ward moved to newly promoted Premier League side Burnley, signing a three-year deal for an undisclosed fee. Ward made only ten appearances for Burnley in 2014–15 due to injuries as the side suffered an immediate relegation. In 2015–16 Burnley went on a 23-unbeaten run which saw them gain promotion back to the Premier League as champions. Ward only missed one league match in 2016–17, playing a total of 38 times helping the Clarets avoid relegation, finishing in 16th position. Ward signed a contract extension in August 2017, keeping him contracted at Turf Moor until 2019. Ward scored in a 3–2 win away at champions Chelsea on the opening day of the 2017–18 season. Ward made 28 appearances as Burnley had a successful campaign finishing in 7th, qualifying for the UEFA Europa League. Ward lost his place in the side to Charlie Taylor in 2018–19, only making ten appearances. On 12 May 2019, it was confirmed he would leave Burnley at the end of his contract on 1 July 2019.

=== Stoke City ===
On 26 June 2019, Ward joined Stoke City, signing an initial one-year contract. Ward made his debut against Charlton Athletic on 10 August 2019 in a 3–1 defeat. Ward was in and out of the team in the first half of the 2019–20 season as Stoke were involved in a relegation fight. He picked up a calf injury against Fulham 29 December 2019 which ruled him out for four months. Due to the COVID-19 pandemic the season was suspended for 15 weeks and extended into the summer and on 1 July 2020 Ward signed a contract extension to cover the remaining matches. After only playing once since the restart Ward left Stoke on 17 July 2020.

=== Ipswich Town ===
On 17 August 2020, Ward joined League One side Ipswich Town on a free transfer. He signed a one-year deal with the club, with the option of an additional one-year extension. Ward made his debut for Ipswich on 5 September, starting in a 3–0 win over Bristol Rovers in a League Cup first round tie at Portman Road. Having made 31 appearances in all competitions during the 2020–21 season, the club announced on 5 May 2021 that Ward would not be offered a new deal and would leave the club at the end of the season.

=== Walsall ===
On 9 July 2021, Ward joined Walsall on a one-year deal. On 22 April 2022, Ward announced his retirement from football.

== International career ==
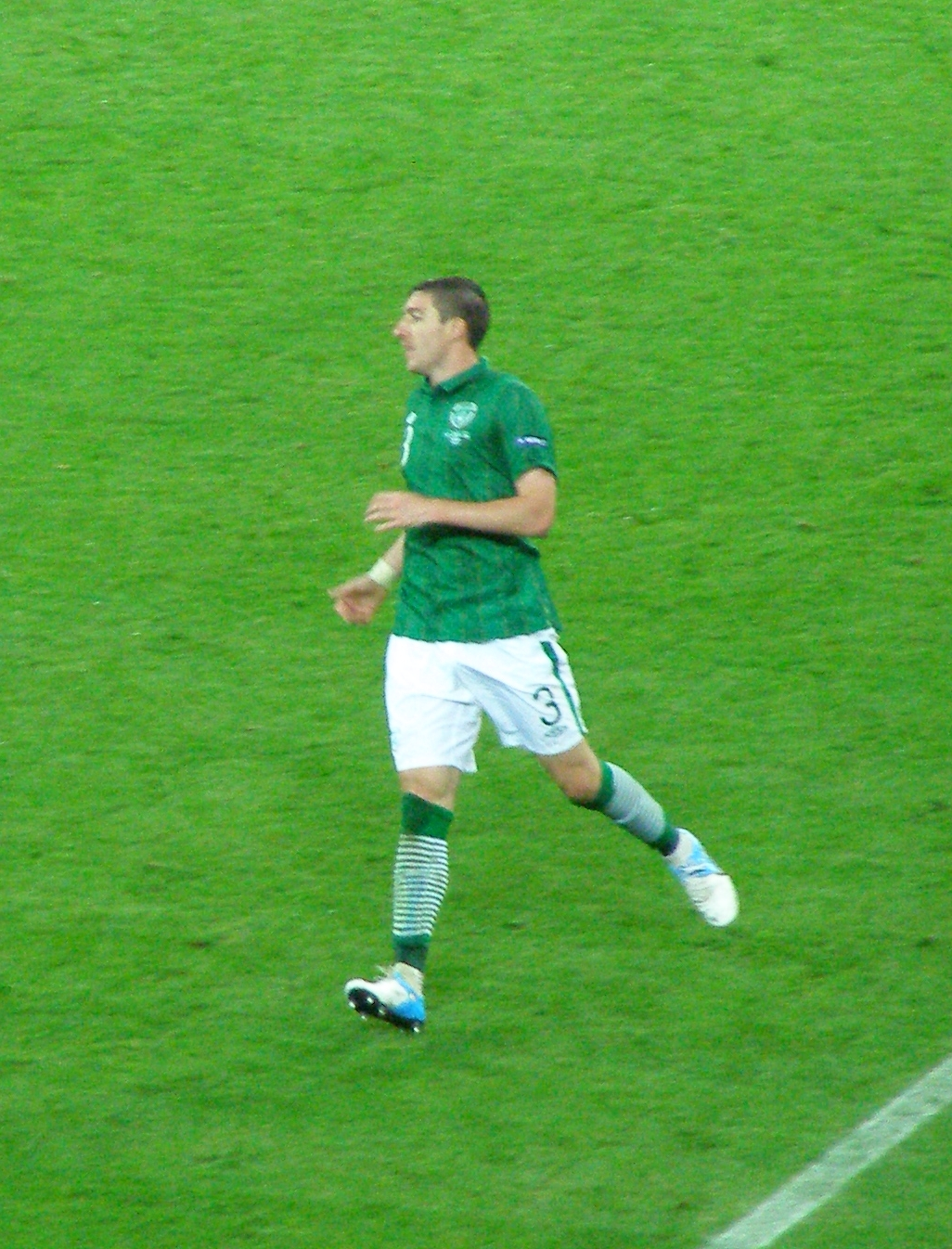
Ward in action during Euro 2012

Ward received his first full call-up to the Republic of Ireland national team on 4 May 2011, for friendlies against Northern Ireland and Scotland as well as a UEFA Euro 2012 qualifier against Macedonia. He made his national team debut on 24 May 2011 in a Nations Cup game against Northern Ireland, where he opened the scoring in a 5–0 victory. Ward made his competitive debut for the Republic of Ireland against Slovakia in a UEFA Euro 2012 qualifying match, during which he kept a clean sheet in a 0–0 draw. Ward scored his second international goal in the second leg of the play-off for UEFA Euro 2012 against Estonia, sealing Ireland's place in their first major tournament since 2002 with an unprecedented 5–1 aggregate win.

Ward was picked in Trapattoni's 23-man squad for the Euro 2012 finals in Poland and Ukraine, going on to play in all three of their matches in the tournament before their group stage elimination.

He played in three of Ireland's four matches at Euro 2016 as the Boys in Green made the knockout stages, losing to France in the Round of 16.

He announced his retirement from international football on 14 March 2019 after missing out on the final squad for the Euro 2020 qualifiers against Gibraltar and Georgia.

== Coaching career ==
=== Brackley Town ===
On 29 September 2022, Ward was appointed assistant manager of National League North club Brackley Town, assisting former Wolverhampton Wanderers teammate Roger Johnson in his first managerial role.

=== Solihull Moors ===
On 26 June 2023, Ward was appointed Director of Football at National League club Solihull Moors. On 5 August 2025, he stepped down from his role in order to spend more time with his family.

=== Dubai Irish ===
In August 2025, Ward joined UAE Third Division League club Dubai Irish in the role of Head of Football Development. His responsibilities included working with Sean O'Shea to support the club's professional team.

== Career statistics ==
=== Club ===
Appearances and goals by club, season and competition
Club	Season	League			Cup		League Cup		Other		Total	
Club	Season	Division	Apps	Goals	Apps	Goals	Apps	Goals	Apps	Goals	Apps	Goals
Bohemians	2003	LOI Premier Division	6	0							?	?
Bohemians	2004	LOI Premier Division	16	2							?	?
Bohemians	2005	LOI Premier Division	29	7							?	?
Bohemians	2006	LOI Premier Division	23	2							?	?
Bohemians	Total		74	11							93	26
Wolverhampton Wanderers	2006–07	Championship	18	3	1	0	—		2 (Note: Appearances in Football League Championship play-offs)	0	21	3
Wolverhampton Wanderers	2007–08	Championship	29	0	1	0	1	0	—		31	0
Wolverhampton Wanderers	2008–09	Championship	42	0	1	0	1	0	—		44	0
Wolverhampton Wanderers	2009–10	Premier League	22	0	2	0	0	0	—		24	0
Wolverhampton Wanderers	2010–11	Premier League	34	1	3	0	0	0	—		37	1
Wolverhampton Wanderers	2011–12	Premier League	38	3	2	0	1	0	—		41	3
Wolverhampton Wanderers	2012–13	Championship	39	2	1	0	1	0	—		41	2
Wolverhampton Wanderers	Total		222	9	11	0	4	0	2	0	239	9
Brighton & Hove Albion (loan)	2013–14	Championship	44	4	1	0	0	0	2	0	47	4
Burnley	2014–15	Premier League	9	0	0	0	1	0	—		10	0
Burnley	2015–16	Championship	24	1	2	1	1	0	—		27	2
Burnley	2016–17	Premier League	37	1	1	0	0	0	—		38	1
Burnley	2017–18	Premier League	28	1	0	0	0	0	—		28	1
Burnley	2018–19	Premier League	3	0	2	0	1	0	4 (Note: Appearances in UEFA Europa League)	0	10	0
Burnley	Total		101	3	5	1	3	0	4	0	113	4
Stoke City	2019–20	Championship	15	0	0	0	2	0	—		17	0
Ipswich Town	2020–21	League One	30	0	0	0	1	0	0	0	31	0
Walsall	2021–22	League Two	27	0	1	0	1	0	1 (Note: Appearances in EFL Trophy)	0	30	0
Career total			513	27	18	1	11	0	9	0	570	43

=== International ===
Appearances and goals by national team and year
National team	Year	Apps	Goals
Republic of Ireland	2011	9	2
Republic of Ireland	2012	9	0
Republic of Ireland	2013	2	0
Republic of Ireland	2014	9	0
Republic of Ireland	2015	2	0
Republic of Ireland	2016	9	1
Republic of Ireland	2017	9	0
Republic of Ireland	2018	1	0
Total		50	3

=== International goals ===
Republic of Ireland score listed first, score column indicates score after each Ward goal.

International goals by date, venue, cap, opponent, score, result and competition
No.	Date	Venue	Cap	Opponent	Score	Result	Competition	Ref
1	24 May 2011	Aviva Stadium, Dublin, Ireland	1	Northern Ireland	1–0	5–0	2011 Nations Cup	
2	15 November 2011	Aviva Stadium, Dublin, Ireland	9	Estonia	1–0	1–1	UEFA Euro 2012 qualifying play-offs	
3	31 May 2016	Turners Cross, Cork, Ireland	33	Belarus	1–2	1–2	Friendly	

== Honours ==
Wolverhampton Wanderers

- Football League Championship: 2008–09

Burnley

- Football League Championship: 2015–16

Republic of Ireland

- Nations Cup: 2011

Individual

- Football League Championship Player of the Month: February 2007
