= 2013–14 Brighton & Hove Albion F.C. season =

113th season in existence of Brighton & Hove Albion

Brighton & Hove Albion
2013–14 season
- Chairman: Tony Bloom
- Head Coach: Óscar García
- Stadium: Falmer Stadium
- Championship: 6th
- Play-offs: Semi-finals
- FA Cup: Fifth round
- League Cup: First round
- Top goalscorer: League: Leonardo Ulloa (14); All: Leonardo Ulloa (16)
- Highest home attendance: 28,282 vs AFC Bournemouth (Champ, 1 Jan 2014)
- Lowest home attendance: 8,409 vs Newport County (LC, 6 Aug 2013)
- Average home league attendance: 23,894
Home colours	Away colours

The 2013–14 season was Brighton & Hove Albion Football Club's third consecutive season in the Championship. It was their first season under the management of Óscar García following the suspension and sacking of Gus Poyet in the summer. Brighton reached the playoffs for a second consecutive season after finishing 6th, however after losing 6–2 on aggregate to Derby County in the semi-finals Garcia resigned as manager.

== Squad ==
No.	Name	Position (s)	Nationality	Place of Birth	Date of Birth (Age)	Club apps	Club goals	Int. caps	Int. goals	Signed from	Date signed	Fee	Contract End
Goalkeepers
1	Peter Brezovan	GK	(Slovakia)	Bratislava	9 December 1979 (aged 34)	54	0	–	–	Swindon Town	1 August 2009	Free	30 June 2014
16	Casper Ankergren	GK	(Denmark)	Køge	9 November 1979 (aged 34)	73	0	–	–	Leeds United	6 August 2010	Free	30 June 2014
29	Tomasz Kuszczak	GK	(Poland)	Krosno Odrzanskie	20 March 1982 (aged 32)	46	0	11	0	Manchester United	19 June 2012	Free	30 June 2014
Defenders
2	Bruno	RB	(Spain)	El Masnou	1 October 1980 (aged 33)	31	1	5	0	Valencia	25 June 2012	Free	30 June 2014
3	Gordon Greer	CB	(Scotland)	Glasgow	14 December 1980 (aged 33)	126	2	–	–	Swindon Town	13 July 2010	£264,000	30 June 2015
5	Lewis Dunk	CB	(England)	Brighton	21 November 1991 (aged 22)	54	0	–	–	Academy	1 July 2009	Trainee	30 June 2013
6	Adam El-Abd	CB	(Egypt)	Brighton (England)	11 September 1984 (aged 29)	331	7	5	0	Academy	1 July 2003	Trainee	30 June 2015
14	Iñigo Calderón	RB/CB	(Spain)	Vitoria	4 January 1982 (aged 32)	141	13	–	–	Alavés	7 January 2010	Free	30 June 2014
15	Adam Chicksen	LB	(England)	Milton Keynes	27 September 1991 (aged 22)	–	–	–	–	Milton Keynes Dons	15 July 2013	Undisclosed	30 June 2016
17	Stephen Ward	LB/LW	(Republic of Ireland)	Dublin	20 August 1985 (aged 28)	–	–	18	2	Wolverhampton Wanderers	16 August 2013	Loan	31 May 2014
20	Matthew Upson	CB	(England)	Eye	18 April 1979 (aged 35)	19	1	21	2	Stoke City	10 July 2013	Free	30 June 2014
28	Vitālijs Maksimenko	LB	(Latvia)	Riga	8 December 1990 (aged 23)	–	–	4	–	Free agent	5 January 2013	Free	30 June 2015
Midfielders
4	Keith Andrews	CM	(Republic of Ireland)	Dublin	13 September 1980 (aged 33)	–	–	35	3	Bolton Wanderers	10 August 2013	Loan	31 May 2014
8	Andrew Crofts	CM/RM	(Wales)	Chatham (England)	29 May 1984 (aged 30)	75	7	24	0	Norwich City	2 August 2012	£334,000	30 June 2015
10	Kemy Agustien	CM	(Netherlands)	Willemstad	20 August 1986 (aged 27)	–	–	–	–	Swansea City	1 August 2013	Free	30 June 2015
11	Andrea Orlandi	LM/LB/CM	(Spain)	Barcelona	3 August 1984 (aged 29)	36	7	–	–	Swansea City	31 August 2012	Free	30 June 2014
18	Jake Forster-Caskey	CM/LM	(England)	Southend-on-Sea	25 April 1994 (aged 20)	11	2	–	–	Academy	30 April 2010	Trainee	30 June 2015
21	David López	AM/LW	(Spain)	Logroño	10 September 1982 (aged 31)	31	9	–	–	Athletic Bilbao	31 August 2012	Free	30 June 2014
23	Craig Conway	LW/RW	(Scotland)	Irvine	2 May 1985 (aged 29)	–	–	5	0	Cardiff City	13 September 2013	Loan	14 December 2013
25	Kazenga LuaLua	RW/LW	(Democratic Republic of the Congo)	Kinshasa	10 December 1990 (aged 23)	86	11	–	–	Newcastle United	16 July 2011	£1,122,000	30 June 2014
26	Liam Bridcutt	DM/RM/CM	(Scotland)	Reading (England)	8 May 1989 (aged 25)	139	2	1	0	Chelsea	28 August 2010	Free	30 June 2013
30	Will Buckley	LW/RW/CF	(England)	Oldham	21 November 1989 (aged 24)	74	17	–	–	Watford	6 June 2011	£1,000,000	30 June 2014
Forwards
7	Will Hoskins	CF/LW/RW	(England)	Nottingham	6 May 1986 (aged 28)	21	2	–	–	Bristol Rovers	20 May 2011	£500,000	30 June 2014
9	Ashley Barnes	CF/LW	(England)	Bath (England)	30 October 1989 (aged 24)	143	47	–	–	Plymouth Argyle	8 July 2010	£413,600	30 June 2014
12	Craig Mackail-Smith	CF/LW/RW	(Scotland)	Watford (England)	25 February 1984 (aged 30)	81	21	6	1	Peterborough United	4 July 2011	£2,500,000	30 June 2015
19	Leonardo Ulloa	CF	(Argentina)	General Roca	26 July 1986 (aged 27)	18	10	–	–	Almería	16 January 2013	£1,600,000	30 June 2017
22	George Barker	CF	(England)	Portsmouth	26 September 1991 (aged 22)	3	0	–	–	Academy	1 July 2013	Trainee	30 June 2014
24	Ben Dickenson	CF	(England)	Ashford	26 February 1993 (aged 21)	0	0	–	–	Dorchester Town	20 January 2012	Undisclosed	30 June 2014
27	Solly March	RW/LW	(England)	Eastbourne	20 July 1994 (aged 19)	86	11	–	–	Lewes FC	July 2011	Scholarship	ll 30 June 2017
44	Leroy Lita	CF	(England)	Kinshasa (Zaire)	28 December 1984 (aged 29)	–	–	–	–	Swansea City	16 October 2013	Loan	1 January 2014

=== Statistics ===
As of 11 May 2014

No.	Pos	Nat	Player	Total		Championship		FA Cup		League Cup		Play-offs	
No.	Pos	Nat	Player	Apps	Goals	Apps	Goals	Apps	Goals	Apps	Goals	Apps	Goals
1	GK	(Slovakia) SVK	Peter Brezovan	8	0	4	0	4	0	0	0	0	0
2	DF	(Spain) ESP	Bruno	33	1	31+2	1	0	0	0	0	0	0
3	DF	(Scotland) SCO	Gordon Greer	44	0	40	0	1	0	1	0	2	0
4	MF	(Republic of Ireland) IRL	Keith Andrews (on loan from Bolton Wanderers)	37	1	28+3	1	3+1	0	0	0	2	0
5	DF	(England) ENG	Lewis Dunk	11	0	4+2	0	3+1	0	0	0	1	0
6	MF	(England) ENG	Dale Stephens	14	2	12+2	2	0	0	0	0	0	0
7	FW	(England) ENG	Will Hoskins	0	0	0	0	0	0	0	0	0	0
8	MF	(Wales) WAL	Andrew Crofts	24	6	23	5	1	1	0	0	0	0
9	FW	(Spain) ESP	David Rodríguez	12	1	6+4	1	1+1	0	0	0	0	0
10	MF	(Netherlands) NED	Kemy Agustien	14	0	5+6	0	2	0	1	0	0	0
11	MF	(Spain) ESP	Andrea Orlandi	18	0	9+5	0	1+1	0	0	0	2	0
12	FW	(Scotland) SCO	Craig Mackail-Smith	7	0	0+5	0	0	0	0	0	0+2	0
14	DF	(Spain) ESP	Iñigo Calderón	30	2	18+5	2	4	0	1	0	2	0
15	DF	(England) ENG	Adam Chicksen	5	0	0+1	0	3	0	0	0	0+1	0
16	GK	(Denmark) DEN	Casper Ankergren	2	0	1	0	0	0	1	0	0	0
17	DF	(Republic of Ireland) IRL	Stephen Ward (on loan from Wolverhampton Wanderers)	47	4	44	4	1	0	0	0	2	0
18	MF	(England) ENG	Jake Forster-Caskey	34	3	19+9	3	4	0	1	0	1	0
19	FW	(Argentina) ARG	Leonardo Ulloa	38	16	31+2	14	2	2	0+1	0	2	0
20	DF	(England) ENG	Matthew Upson	47	2	43	2	3	0	0	0	1	0
21	MF	(Spain) ESP	David López	36	3	26+8	3	1	0	1	0	0	0
22	FW	(England) ENG	Jonathan Obika (on loan from Tottenham Hotspur)	8	1	0+5	0	1+2	1	0	0	0	0
23	MF	(Scotland) SCO	Craig Conway (on loan from Cardiff City)	13	1	11+2	1	0	0	0	0	0	0
24	FW	(England) ENG	Ben Dickenson	0	0	0	0	0	0	0	0	0	0
25	MF	(Democratic Republic of the Congo) COD	Kazenga LuaLua	39	2	11+21	1	1+3	0	1	0	0+2	1
27	MF	(England) ENG	Solomon March	27	1	7+16	0	2+1	1	0	0	0+1	0
28	DF	(Latvia) LAT	Vitālijs Maksimenko	2	0	1	0	0	0	0+1	0	0	0
29	GK	(Poland) POL	Tomasz Kuszczak	43	0	41	0	0	0	0	0	2	0
30	MF	(England) ENG	Will Buckley	33	3	20+10	3	1	0	1	0	1	0
34	FW	(England) ENG	Shamir Goodwin	0	0	0	0	0	0	0	0	0	0
35	FW	(England) ENG	Jesse Lingard (on loan from Manchester United)	17	4	15	3	0	0	0	0	2	1
38	DF	(England) ENG	Rohan Ince	33	1	26+2	0	3	1	1	0	1	0
39	DF	(England) ENG	Bradley Barry	0	0	0	0	0	0	0	0	0	0
44	FW	(England) ENG	Leroy Lita (on loan from Swansea City)	5	1	0+5	1	0	0	0	0	0	0
Players who left the club during the season:
6	DF	(Egypt) EGY	Adam El-Abd	11	0	5+4	0	1	0	1	0	0	0
9	FW	(England) ENG	Ashley Barnes	24	6	17+5	5	1	0	1	1	0	0
22	FW	(England) ENG	George Barker	1	0	0+1	0	0	0	0	0	0	0
26	MF	(England) ENG	Liam Bridcutt	12	0	8+3	0	0	0	0+1	0	0	0

==== Captains ====
As of 28 November 2013

No.	P	Name	Country	No. games	Notes
3	DF	Gordon Greer	(Scotland)	13	Club captain

Source: Competitive match reports.
Competitive matches only
Matches started as captain only
Country: FIFA nationality; No.: Squad number; P: Position; Name: Player name; No. Games: Number of games started as captain.

==== Goalscorers ====
As of 11 May 2014

Rank	No.	Pos.	Name	Championship	FA Cup	League Cup	Play-offs	Total
1	19	FW	Leonardo Ulloa	14	2	0	0	16
2	9	FW	Ashley Barnes	5	0	1	0	6
2	8	MF	Andrew Crofts	5	1	0	0	6
4	17	DF	Stephen Ward	4	0	0	0	4
4	35	MF	Jesse Lingard	3	0	0	1	4
6	21	MF	David López	3	0	0	0	3
6	30	MF	Will Buckley	3	0	0	0	3
6	18	MF	Jake Forster-Caskey	3	0	0	0	3
9	6	MF	Dale Stephens	2	0	0	0	2
9	14	DF	Iñigo Calderón	2	0	0	0	2
9	20	DF	Matthew Upson	2	0	0	0	2
9	25	FW	Kazenga LuaLua	1	0	0	1	2
12	2	DF	Bruno	1	0	0	0	1
12	3	DF	Gordon Greer	1	0	0	0	1
12	4	MF	Keith Andrews	1	0	0	0	1
12	9	FW	David Rodríguez	1	0	0	0	1
12	22	FW	Obika	0	1	0	0	1
12	23	MF	Craig Conway	1	0	0	0	1
12	27	MF	Solomon March	0	1	0	0	1
12	38	DF	Ince	0	1	0	0	1
12	44	FW	Leroy Lita	1	0	0	0	1
Own Goals				2	0	0	0	2
Total				55	6	1	2	64

==== Disciplinary record ====
As of 11 May 2014

No.	Pos.	Name	Championship		FA Cup		League Cup		Play-offs		Total	
No.	Pos.	Name	Yellow card	Red card	Yellow card	Red card	Yellow card	Red card	Yellow card	Red card	Yellow card	Red card
2	DF	Bruno	10	0	0	0	0	0	0	0	10	0
3	DF	Gordon Greer	7	1	0	0	0	0	0	0	7	1
4	MF	Keith Andrews	6	0	0	0	0	0	1	0	7	0
5	DF	Lewis Dunk	1	0	1	0	0	0	1	0	3	0
6	DF	Adam El-Abd	2	0	0	0	0	0	0	0	2	0
6	MF	Dale Stephens	2	0	0	0	0	0	0	0	2	0
8	MF	Andrew Crofts	4	0	0	0	0	0	0	0	4	0
9	FW	Ashley Barnes	3	0	0	0	0	0	0	0	3	0
9	FW	David Rodríguez	1	0	0	0	0	0	0	0	1	0
11	MF	Andrea Orlandi	1	0	1	0	0	0	0	0	2	0
14	DF	Iñigo Calderón	5	0	0	0	0	1	1	0	6	1
15	DF	Adam Chicksen	0	0	1	0	0	0	1	0	2	0
17	DF	Stephen Ward	3	0	0	0	0	0	0	0	3	0
18	MF	Jake Forster-Caskey	3	0	0	0	1	0	1	0	5	0
19	FW	Leonardo Ulloa	6	1	0	0	0	0	1	0	7	1
20	DF	Matthew Upson	3	0	0	0	0	0	0	0	3	0
21	MF	David López	2	0	0	0	0	0	0	0	2	0
22	FW	Jonathan Obika	0	0	1	0	0	0	0	0	1	0
25	MF	Kazenga LuaLua	5	0	2	0	0	0	0	0	7	0
26	MF	Liam Bridcutt	2	0	0	0	0	0	0	0	2	0
27	DF	Solomon March	2	0	0	0	0	0	0	0	2	0
28	DF	Vitālijs Maksimenko	1	0	0	0	0	0	0	0	1	0
35	MF	Jesse Lingard	1	0	0	0	0	0	0	0	1	0
38	MF	Rohan Ince	4	0	1	0	0	0	0	0	5	0
Total			74	2	7	0	1	1	6	0	88	3

=== Contracts ===
No.	Pos.	Nat.	Name	Age	Status	Contract length	Expiry date	Source
6	DF	(Egypt) (England)	Adam El-Abd	28	Signed	2 years	June 2015	Sky Sports
21	MF	(Spain)	David López	30	Signed	1 year	June 2014	

== Pre-season ==
=== Friendlies ===
6 July 2012	Whitehawk	0–3	Brighton & Hove Albion	Whitehawk
15:30		Report	March 44'; Barnes 45'; Orlandi 62'	Stadium: The Enclosed Ground; Attendance: 1,300

17 July 2012	Getafe	0–1	Brighton & Hove Albion	Getafe
19:30			Orlandi 12'	Stadium: Coliseum Alfonso Pérez

20 July 2013	Sporting Gijón	1–2	Brighton & Hove Albion	Segovia
20:00	Nacho Cases 75' (pen.)		Barnes 7'; Ulloa 88'	Stadium: La Albuera

24 July 2013	Crawley Town	0–2	Brighton & Hove Albion	Crawley
20:00			Barker 33'; Crofts 59' (pen.)	Stadium: Broadfield Stadium

== Competitions ==
=== League table ===
Pos	Team	Pld	W	D	L	GF	GA	GD	Pts	Promotion, qualification or relegation
4	Queens Park Rangers (O, P)	46	23	11	12	60	44	+16	80	Qualification for Championship play-offs
5	Wigan Athletic	46	21	10	15	61	48	+13	73	Qualification for Championship play-offs
6	Brighton & Hove Albion	46	19	15	12	55	40	+15	72	Qualification for Championship play-offs
7	Reading	46	19	14	13	70	56	+14	71	
8	Blackburn Rovers	46	18	16	12	70	62	+8	70	

Source: BBC Sport
Rules for classification: 1) points; 2) goal difference; 3) number of goals scored
(O) Play-off winners; (P) Promoted

=== Result summary ===
Overall								Home						Away					
Pld	W	D	L	GF	GA	GD	Pts	W	D	L	GF	GA	GD	W	D	L	GF	GA	GD
46	19	15	12	55	40	+15	72	10	7	6	31	21	+10	9	8	6	24	19	+5

Last updated: 3 May 2014.

=== Result by round ===
Round	1	2	3	4	5	6	7	8	9	10	11	12	13	14	15	16	17	18	19	20	21	22	23	24	25	26	27	28	29	30	31	32	33	34	35	36	37	38	39	40	41	42	43	44	45	46
Ground	A	H	A	H	H	A	A	H	A	H	H	A	H	A	H	A	A	H	H	A	H	A	A	H	H	A	A	A	H	H	H	A	H	H	A	H	A	H	A	A	A	H	A	H	H	A
Result	L	L	W	W	D	D	D	W	L	D	L	D	D	W	W	W	D	L	W	W	D	L	W	D	W	L	D	L	W	W	L	W	D	W	W	L	L	L	D	D	W	W	D	D	W	W
Position	15	19	16	10	13	14	13	10	12	12	14	14	16	12	10	9	9	11	10	8	8	9	8	7	6	7	8	9	8	7	8	8	8	7	8	8	9	9	9	8	7	6	6	6	6	6

Updated to match(es) played on 3 May 2014. Source:
A = Away; H = Home; W = Win; D = Draw; L = Loss

=== Matches ===
==== Championship ====
3 August 2013 1	Leeds United	2–1	Brighton & Hove Albion	Leeds
15:00	McCormack 19'; Murphy 90'	Report	13' Ulloa	Stadium: Elland Road; Attendance: 33,432

10 August 2013 2	Brighton & Hove Albion	1–2	Derby County	Brighton
15:00	Ulloa 17'	Report	27', 47' Martin	Stadium: Falmer Stadium; Attendance: 26,238

17 August 2013 3	Birmingham City	0–1	Brighton & Hove Albion	Birmingham
15:00		Report	73' Crofts	Stadium: St Andrew's; Attendance: 14,885

24 August 2013 4	Brighton & Hove Albion	2–0	Burnley	Brighton
15:00	Crofts 28'; Ulloa 72'	Report		Stadium: Falmer Stadium; Attendance: 26,007

31 August 2013 5	Brighton & Hove Albion	1–1	Millwall	Brighton
15:00	Ulloa 89'	Report	51' Woolford	Stadium: Falmer Stadium; Attendance: 26,804

14 September 2013 6	Reading	0–0	Brighton & Hove Albion	Reading
15:00	Pogrebnyak (yellow card) 22' (yellow-red card) 31'	Report	(red card) 38' Ulloa	Stadium: Madjeski Stadium; Attendance: 18,306

18 September 2013 7	Queens Park Rangers	0–0	Brighton & Hove Albion	London
19:45		Report		Stadium: Loftus Road; Attendance: 17,246

21 September 2013 8	Brighton & Hove Albion	3–1	Bolton Wanderers	Brighton
15:00	Spearing 53' (o.g.); Calderón 55'; Buckley 57'	Report	D. López 29' (o.g.)	Stadium: Falmer Stadium; Attendance: 26,319

28 September 2013 9	Ipswich Town	2–0	Brighton & Hove Albion	Ipswich
15:00	McGoldrick 20', 24'	Report		Stadium: Portman Road; Attendance: 16,474

1 October 2013 10	Brighton & Hove Albion	1–1	Sheffield Wednesday	Brighton
19:45	Andrews 89'	Report	43' Fryatt	Stadium: Falmer Stadium; Attendance: 25,725

5 October 2013 11	Brighton & Hove Albion	1–3	Nottingham Forest	Brighton
15:00	Crofts 31'	Report	46', 62' (pen.) Lansbury; 60' Henderson	Stadium: Falmer Stadium; Attendance: 27,755

19 October 2013 12	Yeovil Town	0–0	Brighton & Hove Albion	Yeovil
15:00		Report		Stadium: Huish Park; Attendance: 6,873

28 October 2013 13	Brighton & Hove Albion	1–1	Watford	Brighton
20:00	Crofts 54'	Report	4' Murray	Stadium: Falmer Stadium; Attendance: 27,657

2 November 2013 14	Doncaster Rovers	1–3	Brighton & Hove Albion	Doncaster
15:00	Brown 75'	Report	8' Forster-Caskey; 85' Lita; 90' D. López	Stadium: Keepmoat Stadium; Attendance: 7,396

9 November 2013 15	Brighton & Hove Albion	3–0	Blackburn Rovers	Brighton
15:00	Barnes (35 (pen)), 77'; Forster-Caskey 56'	Report		Stadium: Falmer Stadium; Attendance: 27,912

23 November 2013 16	Wigan Athletic	0–1	Brighton & Hove Albion	Wigan
15:00		Report	72' Crofts	Stadium: DW Stadium; Attendance: 14,057

30 November 2013 17	Bournemouth	1–1	Brighton & Hove Albion	Bournemouth
12:15	Ritchie 29'	Report	Barnes 55'	Stadium: Dean Court; Attendance: 9,870

3 December 2013 18	Brighton & Hove Albion	1–2	Barnsley	Brighton
19:45	Upson 63'	Report	35' McCourt; 50' Mellis	Stadium: Falmer Stadium; Attendance: 25,759

7 December 2013 19	Brighton & Hove Albion	3–1	Leicester City	Brighton
15:00	Barnes 9', 77' (pen.); Conway 28'	Report	King 64'	Stadium: Falmer Stadium; Attendance: 27,497

14 December 2013 20	Middlesbrough	0–1	Brighton & Hove Albion	Middlesbrough
15:00		Report	Upson 80'	Stadium: Riverside Stadium; Attendance: 13,635; Referee: Mark Haywood

21 December 2013 21	Brighton & Hove Albion	0–0	Huddersfield Town	Brighton
15:00	LuaLua (yellow card) 86'; Bridcutt (yellow card) 90+1'	Report	Dixon (yellow card) 31'; Woods (yellow card) 88'; Smith (yellow card) 90+2'	Stadium: Falmer Stadium; Attendance: 27,155; Referee: James Adcock

26 December 2013 22	Charlton Athletic	3–2	Brighton & Hove Albion	London
12:30	Wilson 32', 58'; Kermorgant 75'	Report	Ulloa 22', 90'	Stadium: The Valley; Attendance: 17,404; Referee: M. Russell

29 December 2013 23	Blackpool	0–1	Brighton & Hove Albion	Blackpool
15:00	MacKenzie (yellow card) 62'; Basham (yellow card) 77'	Report	Calderón 38'	Stadium: Bloomfield Road; Attendance: 12,280; Referee: Anthony Taylor

1 January 2014 24	Brighton & Hove Albion	1–1	Bournemouth	Brighton
15:00	El-Abd (yellow card) 63'; Bridcutt (yellow card) 74'; Ward 89'	Report	Grabban 14' (pen.); Arter (yellow card) 31'	Stadium: Falmer Stadium; Attendance: 28,282; Referee: Simon Hooper

11 January 2014 25	Brighton & Hove Albion	1–0	Birmingham City	Brighton
15:00	D. López 58'; Andrews (yellow card) 76'; Ince (yellow card) 78'; Orlandi (yellow card) 90+6'	Report	Reilly (yellow card) 27'; Lee (yellow card) 71'; Mullins (yellow card) 90+4'	Stadium: Falmer Stadium; Attendance: 26,796; Referee: Roger East

18 January 2014 26	Derby County	1–0	Brighton & Hove Albion	Derby
15:00	Buxton (yellow card) 28'; Eustace (yellow card) 42'; Forsyth (yellow card) 65'; Bamford 76'; Martin (yellow card) 89'; Ward (yellow card) 90+1'	Report	Greer (yellow card) 18'; Andrews (yellow card) 30'; Ulloa (yellow card) 90+5'	Stadium: iPro Stadium; Attendance: 25,392; Referee: Andy Haines

28 January 2014 27	Burnley	0–0	Brighton & Hove Albion	Burnley
19:45		Report	Ulloa (yellow card) 90+1'	Stadium: Turf Moor; Attendance: 11,054; Referee: Oliver Langford

2 February 2014 28	Watford	2–0	Brighton & Hove Albion	Watford
15:00	Anya 13'; Forestieri 60'; Tőzsér (yellow card) 70'; Ekstrand (yellow card) 90+5'	Report	Greer (yellow card) 79'	Stadium: Vicarage Road; Attendance: 16,096; Referee: David Webb

8 February 2014 29	Brighton & Hove Albion	1–0	Doncaster Rovers	Brighton
15:00	Ulloa 75' (yellow card) 80'	Report	Brown (yellow card) 39'; Méïté (yellow card) 44'; Husband (yellow card) 63'; Sharp (red card) 86'; Khumalo (yellow card) 90+3'	Stadium: Falmer Stadium; Attendance: 27,009; Referee: Gavin Ward

11 February 2014 30	Brighton & Hove Albion	1–0	Leeds United	Brighton
19:45 GMT	Calderón (yellow card) 18'; Ulloa 64'	Report	Murphy (yellow card) 3'; Warnock (yellow card) 33'; Hunt (yellow card) 90'	Stadium: Falmer Stadium; Attendance: 27,700; Referee: Darren Deadman

22 February 2014 31	Brighton & Hove Albion	1–2	Wigan Athletic	Brighton
15:00 GMT	Ulloa 78'	Report	McArthur 21'; McCann 50'; Beausejour (yellow card) 80'	Stadium: Falmer Stadium; Attendance: 27,490; Referee: Carl Boyeson

1 March 2014 32	Millwall	0–1	Brighton & Hove Albion	London
15:00 GMT	Shittu (yellow card) 39'	Report	D. López 39' (pen.); Stephens (yellow card) 72'; Bruno (yellow card) 84'	Stadium: The Den; Attendance: 12,149; Referee: Geoff Eltringham

8 March 2014 33	Brighton & Hove Albion	1–1	Reading	Brighton
15:00 GMT (UTC)	Gunter 16' (o.g.); Greer (yellow card) 36' (yellow-red card) 51'; Andrews (yellow card) 86'; Bruno (yellow card) 90+4'	Report	Hector (yellow card) 45'; Drenthe 64'; Robson-Kanu (yellow card) 67'; Obita (yellow card) 77'	Stadium: Falmer Stadium; Attendance: 27,532; Referee: Fred Graham

11 March 2014 34	Brighton & Hove Albion	2–0	Queens Park Rangers	Brighton
19:45 GMT (UTC)	Ulloa 77'; Lingard (yellow card) 80'; Ward 86'	Report		Stadium: Falmer Stadium; Attendance: 28,019; Referee: Bobby Madley

15 March 2014 35	Bolton Wanderers	0–2	Brighton & Hove Albion	Bolton
15:00 GMT		Report	Buckley 13', 65'	Stadium: Reebok Stadium; Attendance: 15,336; Referee: Scott Duncan

22 March 2014 36	Brighton & Hove Albion	0–2	Ipswich Town	Brighton
15:00 GMT	Bruno (yellow card) 33'	Report	Smith 60' (yellow card) 79'; Murphy 80'	Stadium: Falmer Stadium; Attendance: 29,093; Referee: Darren Drysdale

25 March 2014 37	Sheffield Wednesday	1–0	Brighton & Hove Albion	Sheffield
19:45 GMT	Best 90+1'	Report	Ince (yellow card) 90+9'	Stadium: Hillsborough Stadium; Attendance: 18,192; Referee: Anthony Taylor

29 March 2014 38	Brighton & Hove Albion	0–2	Middlesbrough	Brighton
15:00 GMT		Report	Whitehead (yellow card) 27'; Adomah 65'; Graham 86'	Stadium: Falmer Stadium; Attendance: 27,486; Referee: Graham Scott

1 April 2014 39	Blackburn Rovers	3–3	Brighton & Hove Albion	Blackburn
19:45 GMT	Rhodes 25' (86 (pen)); Cairney 42'	Report	Rodríguez Sánchez 17'; March (yellow card) 69'; Bruno (yellow card) 75'; Greer 79'; Stephens 88'	Stadium: Ewood Park; Attendance: 12,332; Referee: Keith Hill

5 April 2014 40	Barnsley	0–0	Brighton & Hove Albion	Barnsley
15:00 GMT	Lawrence (yellow card) 40'; Etuhu (yellow card) 74' (yellow-red card) 76'	Report	Ward (yellow card) 21'; Rodríguez Sánchez (yellow card) 30'; Ulloa (yellow card) 42'	Stadium: Oakwell; Attendance: 10,195; Referee: Tony Harrington

8 April 2014 41	Leicester City	1–4	Brighton & Hove Albion	Leicester
20:00 GMT	Nugent (yellow card) 45+1'; Wasilewski (yellow card) 63'; Taylor-Fletcher 89'	Report	Ward 17'; Lingard 24'; Ulloa 65', 80'; Greer (yellow card) 85'	Stadium: King Power Stadium; Attendance: 29,722; Referee: Craig Pawson

12 April 2014 42	Brighton & Hove Albion	3–0	Charlton Athletic	Brighton
15:00 GMT	Lingard 11'; Ulloa 43'; Lua-Lua (yellow card) 53'; March (yellow card) 55'; Forster-Caskey 90'	Report	Harriott (yellow card) 52'	Stadium: Falmer Stadium; Attendance: 28,770; Referee: Roger East

18 April 2014 43	Huddersfield Town	1–1	Brighton & Hove Albion	Huddersfield
15:00 GMT	Norwood 6' (yellow card) 72'; Gerrard (yellow card) 23'; Hogg (yellow card) 37'; Woods (yellow card) 47'	Report	Dunk (yellow card) 36'; Greer (yellow card) 77'; Stephens (yellow card) 81'; Bruno 83'	Stadium: John Smith's Stadium; Attendance: 13,460; Referee: Andy Davies

21 April 2014 44	Brighton & Hove Albion	1–1	Blackpool	Brighton
15:00 GMT	Stephens 46'	Report	McGahey (yellow card) 37'; Dobbie 50' (yellow card) 57'; Osbourne (yellow card) 55'; Cathcart (yellow card) 70'; McMahon (yellow card) 90+4'	Stadium: Falmer Stadium; Attendance: 27,610; Referee: Mick Russell

25 April 2014 45	Brighton & Hove Albion	2–0	Yeovil Town	Brighton
19:45 GMT	Andrews (yellow card) 64'; Lua-Lua 78'; Lingard 90+3'	Report	Duffy (yellow card) 54'; Davis (yellow card) 73'	Stadium: Falmer Stadium; Attendance: 26,901; Referee: Andy Madley

3 May 2014 46	Nottingham Forest	1–2	Brighton & Hove Albion	Nottingham
12:15 GMT	Derbyshire 22'; Vaughan (yellow card) 63'; Collins (yellow card) 71'	Report	Ward 53'; Forster-Caskey (yellow card) 58'; Ulloa 90+2' (yellow card) 90+3'	Stadium: City Ground; Attendance: 22,209; Referee: Keith Stroud

==== Championship play-offs ====
8 May 2014 Semi-final first leg	Brighton & Hove Albion	1–2	Derby County	Brighton
19:45 BST	Calderón (yellow card) 8'; Lingard 18'; Keith Andrews (yellow card) 52'; Forster-Caskey (yellow card) 82'	Report	Martin 29' (pen.); Ward (yellow card) 36'; Kuszczak 45' (o.g.); Sammon (yellow card) 77'; Forsyth (yellow card) 84'; Thorne (yellow card) 90+1'	Stadium: Falmer Stadium; Attendance: 27,118; Referee: Roger East

11 May 2014 Semi-final second leg	Derby County	4–1 (6–2 agg.)	Brighton & Hove Albion	Derby
17:15 BST	Hendrick (yellow card) 22', (goal) 87'; Hughes 34'; Martin 56'; Thorne 76'	Report	Dunk (yellow card) 30'; Chicksen (yellow card) 45+3'; Ulloa (yellow card) 56'; LuaLua 89'	Stadium: Pride Park; Referee: Craig Pawson

=== FA Cup ===
4 January 2014 Third round	Brighton & Hove Albion	1–0	Reading	Brighton and Hove
15:00 GMT (UTC)	Crofts 32'; Lua Lua (yellow card) 90+4'	Report	Drenthe (yellow card) 81'	Stadium: Falmer Stadium; Attendance: 20,696; Referee: Chris Foy

25 January 2014 Fourth round	Port Vale	1–3	Brighton & Hove Albion	Burslem
15:00 GMT	Robertson 36'; Myrie-Williams (yellow card) 47'; Grimmer (yellow card) 90+3'	Report	Ince 27'; March 43'; Obika 78'; Ince (yellow card) 16'; Orlandi (yellow card) 23'; Obika (yellow card) 28'; Dunk (yellow card) 65'	Stadium: Vale Park; Attendance: 7,293; Referee: Paul Tierney

17 February 2014 Fifth round	Brighton & Hove Albion	1–1	Hull City	Brighton and Hove
19:45 GMT (UTC)	Ulloa 30'; Chicksen (yellow card) 62'	Report	Aluko (yellow card) 37'; Koren (yellow card) 57'; Sagbo 85'	Stadium: Falmer Stadium; Attendance: 21,352; Referee: Lee Probert

24 February 2014 Fifth round Replay	Hull City	2–1	Brighton & Hove Albion	Kingston upon Hull
19:45 GMT (UTC)	Davies 14'; Koren 36'; Sagbo (yellow card) 77'	Report	Ulloa 68'; LuaLua (yellow card) 90+1'	Stadium: KC Stadium; Attendance: 10,795; Referee: Andre Marriner

=== League Cup ===
6 August 2013 First round	Brighton & Hove Albion	1–3 (a.e.t.)	Newport County	Brighton
19:45	Barnes 18'; Calderón (red card) 67'	Report	81', 94' Crow; 103' Washington	Stadium: Falmer Stadium; Attendance: 8,409

== Transfers ==
All transfers update as of 16 October 2013.

=== In ===
No.	Pos.	Nat.	Name	Age	EU	Moving from	Type	Transfer window	Ends	Transfer fee	Source
20	DF	(England)	Matthew Upson	34	EU	Stoke City	Free Transfer	Summer	2014	Free	BBC Sport
15	DF	(England)	Adam Chicksen	21	EU	Milton Keynes Dons	Bosman Transfer	Summer	2016	Free	BBC Sport
10	MF	(Netherlands)	Kemy Agustien	26	EU	Swansea City (Wales)	Free Transfer	Summer	2015	Free	BBC Sport
4	MF	(Republic of Ireland)	Keith Andrews	32	EU	Bolton Wanderers	Loan	Summer	2014	Season Long Loan	BBC Sport
17	DF	(Republic of Ireland)	Stephen Ward	27	EU	Wolverhampton Wanderers	Loan	Summer	2014	Season Long Loan	BBC Sport

=== Loans in ===
No.	Pos.	Name	Country	Age	Loan club	Started	Ended	Start source	End source
23	MF	Craig Conway	(Scotland)	41	Cardiff City	13 September	14 December	BBC Sport	
44	FW	Leroy Lita	(England) (Zaire)	41	Swansea City	16 October	1 January	BBC Sport	

Sources: For loan start source see "Start source". For loan end source see "End source".
EU = if holds or not a European Union passport; Country: when 2 flags, 1st flag = country that plays for internationally, 2nd flag = country of birth; No. = number on jersey; P = Position (for position name, pause mouse pointer on abbreviation); Name = Name on jersey (for more extensive name, pause mouse pointer on name); In/Out = In: The player came in on loan, Out: The player went out on loan; Loan club = the club that the player moved on loan to or the club that the player came from on loan; Started = the date when the player's loan started; Ended = the date when the player's loan ended.

=== Out ===
No.	Pos.	Name	Country	Age	Type	Moving to	Transfer window	Transfer fee	Apps	Goals	Source
18		Gary Dicker	(Republic of Ireland)	26	Free transfer	Rochdale	Summer	Free	153	6	BBC Sport
22	DF	Marcos Painter	(Republic of Ireland) (England)	26	Free transfer	Portsmouth	Summer	Free	100	1	BBC Sport
15	MF	Vicente	(Spain)	31	Contract ended	Free agent	Summer	Free	31	5	BBC Sport
10	MF	Stephen Dobbie	(Scotland)	30	Transfer	Crystal Palace	Summer	Undisclosed	15	2	BBC Sport
	MF	Ryan Harley	(England)	28	Contract terminated	Swindon Town	Summer	Free	21	2	BBC Sport
23	FW	Torbjørn Agdestein	(Norway)	21	Free transfer	Inverness Caledonian Thistle (Scotland)	Summer	Free	9	0	

EU = if holds or not a European Union passport; Country: when 2 flags, 1st flag = country that plays for internationally, 2nd flag = country of birth; N = number on jersey; P = Position (for position name, pause mouse pointer on abbreviation); Name = Name on jersey (for more extensive name, pause mouse pointer on name); Age = age on the day of the signing; Moving from = only indicate the club the player was playing before start playing for this club in this season, for the type of the moving see Status column; Moving to = only indicates the club the player is going to play next, for the type of the moving see Status column; Ends = when the player's current contract ends; n/a = Not applicable; Apps = Total number of competitive appearances (including substitute appearances) at the club prior to departure; Goals = Total number of competitive goals scored at the club prior to departure.

== Overall summary ==
=== Summary ===
As of 11 May 2014

Games played	53 (46 Championship, 4 FA Cup, 1 League Cup, 2 Play-offs)
Games won	21 (19 Championship, 2 FA Cup, 0 League Cup, 0 Play-offs)
Games drawn	16 (15 Championship, 1 FA Cup, 0 League Cup, 0 Play-offs)
Games lost	16 (12 Championship, 1 FA Cup, 1 League Cup, 2 Play-offs)
Goals scored	64 (55 Championship, 6 FA Cup, 1 League Cup, 2 Play-offs)
Goals conceded	53 (40 Championship, 4 FA Cup, 3 League Cup, 6 Play-offs)
Goal difference	11
Clean sheets	21 (20 Championship, 1 FA Cup, 0 League Cup, 0 Play-offs)
Yellow cards	88 (74 Championship, 7 FA Cup, 1 League Cup, 6 Play-offs)
Red cards	3 (2 Championship, 0 FA Cup, 1 League Cup, 0 Play-offs)
Worst discipline	Gordon Greer (7 (yellow card) , 1 (red card) )
Best result	4–1 vs Leicester City
Worst result	1–3 vs Newport County, 1–3 vs Nottingham Forest
Most appearances	Matthew Upson, Stephen Ward (47)
Top scorer	Leonardo Ulloa (16 goals)
Points	72

=== Score overview ===
As of 3 May 2014

Opposition	Home score	Away score	Double
Barnsley	1–2	0–0	No
Birmingham City	1–0	1–0	Yes
Blackburn Rovers	3–0	3–3	No
Blackpool	1–1	1–0	No
Bolton Wanderers	3–1	2–0	Yes
Bournemouth	1–1	1–1	No
Burnley	2–0	0–0	No
Charlton Athletic	3–0	2–3	No
Derby County	1–2	0–1	No
Doncaster Rovers	1–0	3–1	Yes
Huddersfield Town	0–0	1–1	No
Ipswich Town	0–2	0–2	No
Leeds United	1–0	1–2	No
Leicester City	3–1	4–1	Yes
Middlesbrough	0–2	1–0	No
Millwall	1–1	1–0	No
Nottingham Forest	1–3	2–1	No
Queens Park Rangers	2–0	0–0	No
Reading	1–1	0–0	No
Sheffield Wednesday	1–1	0–1	No
Watford	1–1	0–2	No
Wigan Athletic	1–2	1–0	No
Yeovil Town	2–0	0–0	No
