= Rohan Ince =

Montserratian footballer

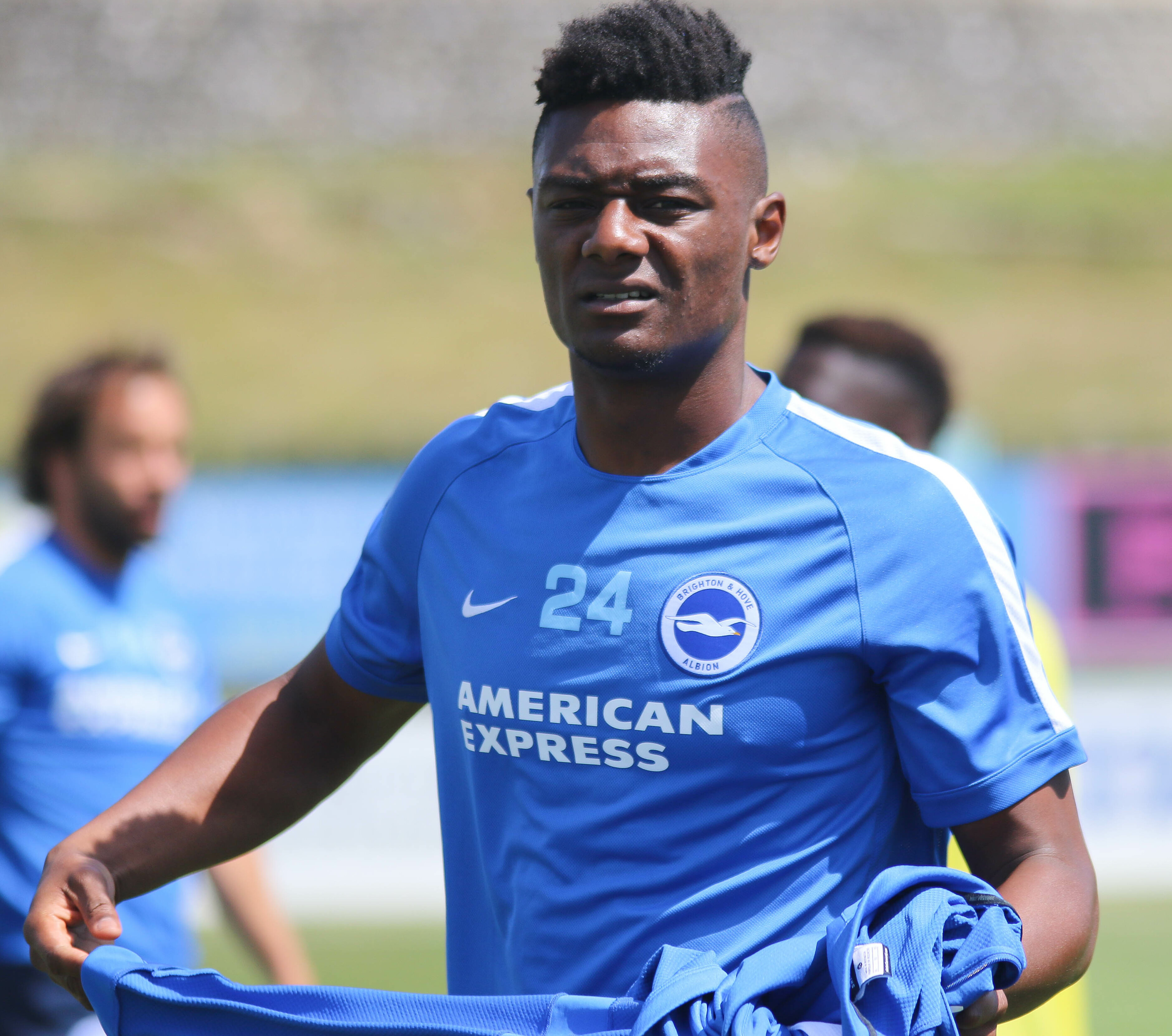
- Ince with Brighton in 2015.

Personal information
- Full name: Rohan Greg Ince
- Date of birth: 8 November 1992 (age 34)
- Place of birth: Whitechapel, England
- Height: 1.91 m (6 ft 3 in)
- Position: Defensive midfielder

Team information
- Current team: Hampton & Richmond Borough
- Number: 24

Youth career
- 1999–2012: Chelsea

Senior career*
Years	Team	Apps	(Gls)
2012–2013	Chelsea	0	(0)
2012	→ Yeovil Town (loan)	2	(0)
2013–2018	Brighton & Hove Albion	72	(1)
2016	→ Fulham (loan)	10	(1)
2017	→ Swindon Town (loan)	14	(2)
2017–2018	→ Bury (loan)	22	(0)
2019–2020	Cheltenham Town	9	(0)
2020–2021	Maidenhead United	30	(0)
2021–2025	Woking	103	(8)
2025–	Hampton & Richmond Borough	5	(0)

International career^{‡}
2021	Montserrat	5	(1)
- * Club domestic league appearances and goals as of 22:50, 1 January 2025 (UTC) ‡ National team caps and goals as of 15:09, 3 July 2021 (UTC)

Rohan Greg Ince (born 8 November 1992) is a professional footballer who plays as a holding midfielder for National League South club Hampton & Richmond Borough. Ince can also play as a central defender. Born in England He represents the Montserrat National Team

== Club career ==
=== Chelsea ===
Ince joined Chelsea's academy at the age of seven, and helped the side win the 2009–10 FA Youth Cup. He signed his first professional contract with Chelsea in July 2010. As he progressed through the club's youth ranks, Ince began playing as a regular within the club's reserve set-up.

==== Loan to Yeovil Town ====
In July 2012, Ince joined League One side Yeovil Town on a six-month loan deal. Ince's Football League debut was delayed due to an injury picked up in pre-season but eventually, on 28 August 2012, Ince made his Yeovil debut as a substitute in the 4–2 League Cup defeat against West Bromwich Albion. On 26 September 2012, Ince was recalled by Chelsea due to a recurrence of ankle and shin injuries.

=== Brighton & Hove Albion ===
On 5 February 2013, following a successful trial period with Brighton & Hove Albion, Ince signed an 18-month contract with the development squad.

In the club's pre–season tour ahead of the 2013–14 season, Ince was featured in the first team squad under the new management of Óscar García. He started his first competitive game for Brighton in a 3–1 after extra time defeat to Newport County in the League Cup on 6 August 2013. He made his full league debut for Brighton four days later on 10 August 2013 against Derby County in a 2–1 defeat. He played as a defensive midfielder position in both of these games. Ince then quickly got involved in the first team for the side, where he played in the defensive midfielder position and competed in the first team in the absence of Liam Bridcutt and Keith Andrews. By December, he formed a defensive midfield partnership with Bridcutt. His performance resulted in him signing a contract extension with the club, keeping him until 2016. In the fourth round of FA Cup against Port Vale, Ince scored his first goal for the club, as well as, setting up one of the goals, in a 3–1 win. However, towards the end of the season, he soon suffered injuries, which was followed up by being dropped from the first team. It came after when he was a fault for conceding an opening goal from Blackburn Rovers's Jordan Rhodes and was substituted at half time after suffering a dead leg, as they drew 3–3 and it turned out to be his last appearance for the side this season. At the end of the 2013–14 season, Ince went on to make thirty–three appearances and scoring once in all competitions. For his performance, he was awarded the club's young player of the season award.

In the 2014–15 season, Ince continued to feature in the first team and found himself, where he played in a deeper berth position. However, he appeared in and out of the substitute bench, as well as, facing new competitions. He then scored his first goal of the season, in a 4–2 win over Swindon Town after the game went extra time in the second round of the League Cup. A month later, on 26 September 2014, he scored again, in a 3–0 win over Burton Albion in the third round of the League Cup. It wasn't until on 10 January 2015 when he scored his first league goal of the season, in a 1–0 win over Charlton Athletic. Weeks later, on 21 January 2015, he set up two goals in three of the three goals in a match against Ipswich Town, as Brighton & Hove Albion won 3–2. By February, Ince continued to establish himself in the midfield position and his performance earned him praised from Manager Chris Hughton. His performance even attracted interests from Premier League clubs, but Hughton dismissed the transfer speculation. Towards the end of the 2014–15 season, Ince soon found himself out of the first team, due to strong competitions that saw him appeared on the substitute bench once again. Nevertheless, Ince ended the 2014–15 season, making thirty–eight appearances and scoring three times in all competitions, he was awarded the club's Goal of the Season.

In the 2015–16 season, Ince remained in the first team, where he mostly featured as a substitute in a number of the matches at the start of the season. As a result, he appeared in a number of matches for the club's development squad. Although he made one start for the side this season, Ince continued to sit out on the substitute bench, as well as, his own injury concerns throughout the first half of the season. Despite this, he, nevertheless, signed a three–year contract with the club.

Despite being told he can leave the club in the summer of the 2016, Ince made his first appearance of the 2016–17 season, season, where he started the whole game as a centre–back position, in a 4–0 win over Colchester United in the first round of the League Cup. However, he remained on the sidelines for every league match in the first half of the season. Despite this, he featured in a number of matches for the League Cup and Football League Trophy, including scoring against Stevenage. He went on to make four appearances for the side during the 2016–17 season.

In June 2018, it was confirmed that Ince would be released by Brighton following the expiry of his contract, and he spent time on trial with Charlton Athletic in the run-up to the 2018–19 season.

==== Loan to Fulham ====
On 1 February 2016, Ince moved to Championship club Fulham on loan until the end of the 2015–16 season. He then made his Fulham debut, where he started the match before coming off at half time, in a 1–1 draw against Derby County on 6 February 2016. Ince scored his first goal for the club in a 1–1 draw with Birmingham City on 19 March 2016. Since joining the club, he began receiving a handful of first team football for the side. After making ten appearances and scoring once for the side at the end of the 2015–16 season, he returned to his parent club.

==== Loan to Swindon Town ====
With his first team opportunities limited further at Brighton & Hove Albion, it was announced on 31 January 2017 that Ince joined League One side Swindon Town on loan for the remainder of the 2016–17 campaign. He made his Swindon Town debut on 11 February 2017 against Bury, which saw them lose 1–0. It wasn't until on 28 February 2017 when Ince scored his first goal for the club, in a 3–1 win over Gillingham. Since joining the club, Ince established himself in the starting eleven for the side. He then scored his second goal for the club on 22 April 2017, in a 2–1 loss against Scunthorpe United, a game that saw Swindon Town relegated to League Two. Despite missing two matches during his loan spell at Swindon Town, Ince made fourteen appearances and scoring two times in all competitions.

==== Loan to Bury ====
On 25 August 2017, Ince joined Bury on loan for the 2017–18 season. He made his Bury debut the next day, where he started the whole game, in a 0–0 draw against Rochdale. However, he was soon plagued between late–September and late–October and was placed on the substitute bench in number of matches. Despite this, he continued to feature in the first team throughout 2017. However, his playing time was soon reduced for the first two months of 2018 but regained towards the end of the season. Ince made 22 league appearances that season where Bury were relegated from League One, finishing bottom. This meant Ince had two consecutive League One relegations.

=== Cheltenham Town ===
After missing the 2018–19 season without being contracted to a club and due to a knee injury, on 2 July 2019, Ince signed for Cheltenham Town on a free with a one-year contract. On 3 August 2019, Ince played his first game for over a year in a 1–0 away loss to Leyton Orient. He was shown a straight red on his debut, 2 minutes after teammate, Luke Varney received a second yellow.

=== Maidenhead United ===
Ince joined Maidenhead United on 14 November 2020 after a successful trial period, starting the Magpies' game away at Chesterfield the same day. He went on to play 31 times for the Magpies that season.

=== Woking ===
On 19 June 2021, following his release from Maidenhead, Ince agreed to join fellow National League side, Woking on a one-year deal. He made his debut on the opening day of the 2021–22 campaign, playing the full 90 minutes during Woking's 2–1 away victory over Wealdstone. Just over a week later, he scored his first goal for the club during a 4–0 away victory against Torquay United, netting the Cards' second in the 4th minute, after team-mate, Tahvon Campbell had given his side the lead a minute prior. He went onto end the campaign with thirty-five appearances and two goals to his name before signing a new one-year deal ahead of the 2022–23 campaign.

Two weeks into the start of the new campaign, Ince scored his first of the season. Netting the Cards' second during their 2–0 home victory over Dagenham & Redbridge, after team-mate, Reece Grego-Cox had given Woking the lead just three minutes earlier. Ince went onto prove to be an influential member of Woking's 2022–23 campaign, with significant contributions towards their play-off push. Including scoring the club's goal of the season, in a 2–1 away victory over Dorking Wanderers in April 2023 and netting during their play-off eliminator tie against Bromley, which they eventually succumbed to a 2–1 defeat. He went onto finish the campaign, with forty-nine appearances and eight goals. On 19 May 2023, Ince signed a new two-year deal, extending his stay with the club until 2025.

On 6 May 2025, it was announced that Ince would leave the club after a four-year spell upon the expiry of his contract in June. He departed having scored 10 goals in 114 appearances.

=== Hampton & Richmond Borough ===
On 30 May 2025, it was announced that Ince would join National League South club, Hampton & Richmond Borough following his release from Woking.

== International career ==
Ince was called up to the Montserrat squad for 2022 FIFA World Cup qualification in March 2021. He made his debut against Antigua and Barbuda on 24 March.

== Career statistics ==
=== Club ===
As of 24 April 2026

Appearances and goals by club, season and competition
Club	Season	League			FA Cup		League Cup		Other		Total	
Club	Season	Division	Apps	Goals	Apps	Goals	Apps	Goals	Apps	Goals	Apps	Goals
Chelsea	2010–11	Premier League	0	0	0	0	0	0	0	0	0	0
Chelsea	2011–12	Premier League	0	0	0	0	0	0	0	0	0	0
Chelsea	2012–13	Premier League	0	0	0	0	—		0	0	0	0
Chelsea	Total		0	0	0	0	0	0	0	0	0	0
Yeovil Town (loan)	2012–13	League One	2	0	—		1	0	1 (Note: Appearances in Football League Trophy)	0	4	0
Brighton & Hove Albion	2012–13	Championship	0	0	—		—		0	0	0	0
Brighton & Hove Albion	2013–14	Championship	28	0	3	1	1	0	1 (Note: Appearance in Championship play-offs)	0	33	1
Brighton & Hove Albion	2014–15	Championship	32	1	2	0	4	2	—		38	3
Brighton & Hove Albion	2015–16	Championship	12	0	1	0	2	0	0	0	15	0
Brighton & Hove Albion	2016–17	Championship	0	0	1	0	3	0	—		4	0
Brighton & Hove Albion	2017–18	Premier League	0	0	0	0	1	0	—		1	0
Brighton & Hove Albion	Total		72	1	7	1	11	2	1	0	91	4
Brighton & Hove Albion U23	2016–17	—			—		—		3 (Note: Appearances in EFL Trophy)	0	3	0
Fulham (loan)	2015–16	Championship	10	1	—		—		—		10	1
Swindon Town (loan)	2016–17	League One	14	2	—		—		—		14	2
Bury (loan)	2017–18	League One	22	0	2	0	—		4	0	28	0
Cheltenham Town	2019–20	League Two	9	0	2	0	0	0	4 (Note: Two appearances in EFL Trophy and two appearances in League Two play-offs)	0	15	0
Maidenhead United	2020–21	National League	30	0	0	0	—		1 (Note: Appearance in FA Trophy)	0	31	0
Woking	2021–22	National League	35	2	1	0	—		1	1	37	2
Woking	2022–23	National League	45	6	2	1	—		2 (Note: Appearance FA Trophy and National League play-off)	1	49	8
Woking	2023–24	National League	22	0	3	0	—		0	0	25	0
Woking	2024–25	National League	1	0	0	0	—		2 (Note: One appearance in FA Trophy; One Appearance in National League Cup)	0	3	0
Woking	Total		103	8	6	1	—		5	1	114	10
Hampton & Richmond Borough	2025–26	National League South	5	0	0	0	—		0	0	5	0
Career total			267	12	17	2	12	2	19	1	315	17

=== International ===
As of match played 2 July 2021

Appearances and goals by national team and year
National team	Year	Apps	Goals
Montserrat
Montserrat	2021	5	1
Total		5	1

Scores and results list Montserrat's goal tally first.

No.	Date	Venue	Opponent	Score	Result	Competition
1.	2 June 2021	Estadio Panamericano, San Cristóbal, Dominican Republic	U.S. Virgin Islands	2–0	4–0	2022 FIFA World Cup qualification

== Honours ==
Chelsea Reserves

- FA Youth Cup: 2009–10

== Personal life ==
Ince is a third cousin to former England international Paul Ince and the nephew of former Wimbledon and Brighton & Hove Albion defender Eric Young. His father died in November 2016 and during a 2–1 win over Fulham, Brighton & Hove Albion players wore black armbands in support for Ince. Growing up, Ince attended Thamesmead School.

In August 2016, Ince was charged by Reading Crown Court for wounding with intent after being accused of smashing a bottle over a bouncer's head on Christmas Day the previous year. At the trial, he denied carrying out the attack and insisted it was a case of mistaken identity. He was cleared of all charges after he was found not guilty.
