= Douglas Community School =

Coordinates: 51.8787°N 8.4422°W

- Clermont Avenue, Douglas, Cork, Ireland

Information
- Former name: Coláiste Muire (1926–1974)
- Type: Public
- Established: 1974 (as community school)
- Principal: Pat Barry
- Website: http://www.dcscork.ie/

Douglas Community School, also known as Douglas Com or DCS, is an all boy's community school in Douglas, Cork, Ireland. It was founded as Coláiste Muire by the Presentation Brothers in 1926 as a juniorate (i.e. for lower-cycle secondary students). In 1965 it became a full secondary school. In 1974, it became one of the first "community schools" in Ireland, when it was transferred by the religious order to a local board of management. The Roman Catholic Bishop of Cork's representatives are trustees on the board of management. Its uniform is a navy jumper with royal blue and yellow stripes at neckline. The school also hosts adult education evening classes.

On 16 October 2017, during Storm Ophelia, the school gym was damaged and its roof was blown off.

== Past pupils ==
- Eoghan O'Connell, association footballer
- Colin Doyle, association football goalkeeper
- David Harrington, association football goalkeeper
- Kieran Healy, sociologist
- Adam Idah, association footballer
- Mick Lynch, rock musician
- Adam O'Reilly, association footballer
