= Portmarnock =

Coastal town in County Dublin, Ireland

Portmarnock Port Mearnóg (Irish)
- Suburb (village core)
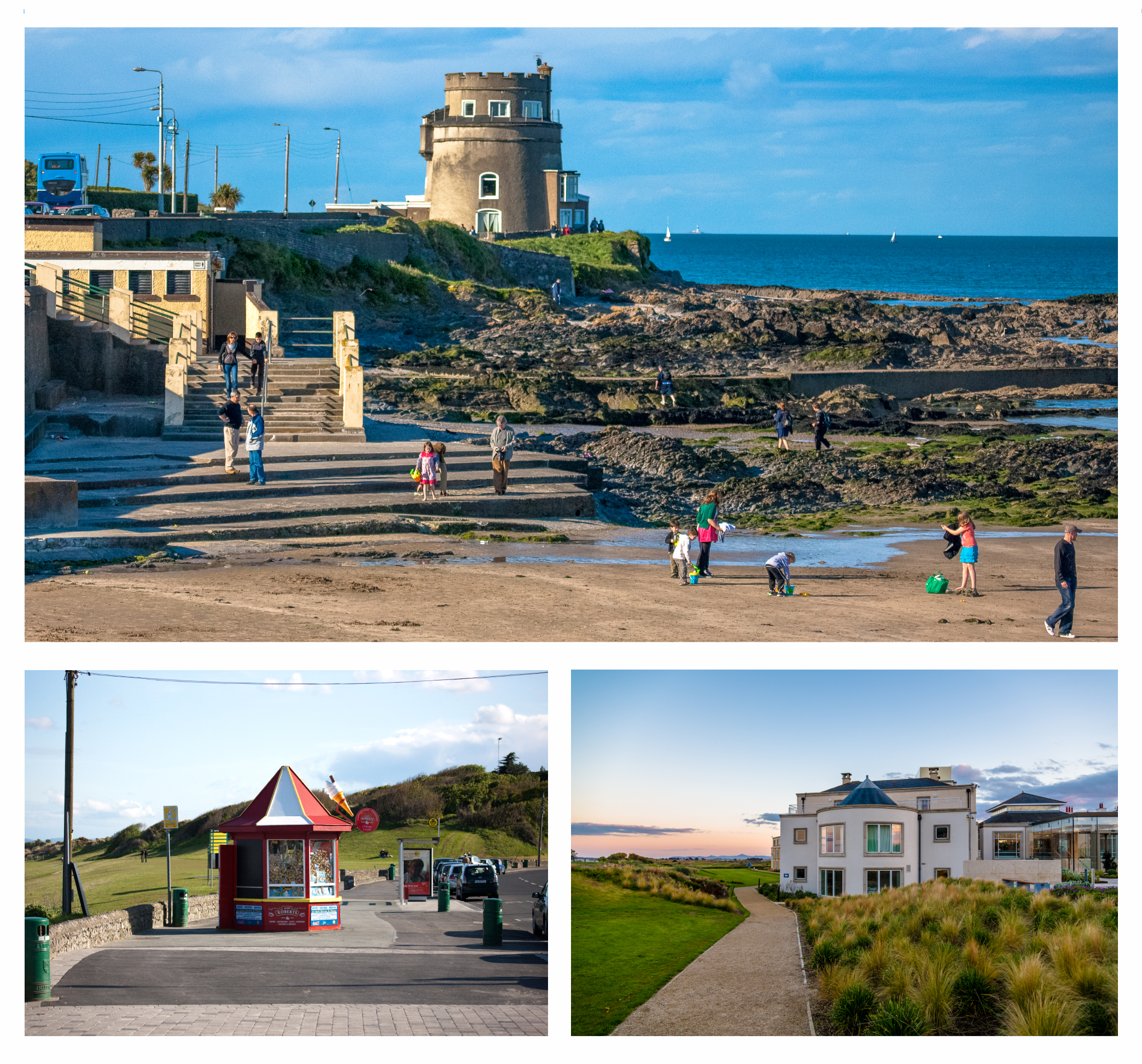
- Portmarnock, Dublin

- Location in Ireland
- Coordinates: 53.4217°N 6.1372°W
- Country: Ireland
- Province: Leinster
- County: Dublin
- Local government area: Fingal
- Elevation: 3 m (9.8 ft)

Population (2022)
  - Total: 10,750
- Eircode routing key: D13

Portmarnock (Irish: Port Mearnóg) is a coastal town in County Dublin, Ireland, north of the city of Dublin, with significant beaches, a modest commercial core and inland residential estates, and two golf courses, including one of Ireland's best known, Portmarnock Golf Club. As of 2022, the population was 10,750, an increase of 13.5% on the 2016 census figure of 9,466.

Portmarnock is also a civil parish in the ancient barony of Coolock. It is in the local government area of Fingal.

== Location ==
Portmarnock lies on the coast between Malahide and Baldoyle. Portmarnock could also be said to border, at sea, Sutton and perhaps Howth in the form of Ireland's Eye. Its major beach, the Velvet Strand, is monitored by a lifeguard during the summer season from early April to the start of October.

=== Velvet Strand, Portmarnock beach ===
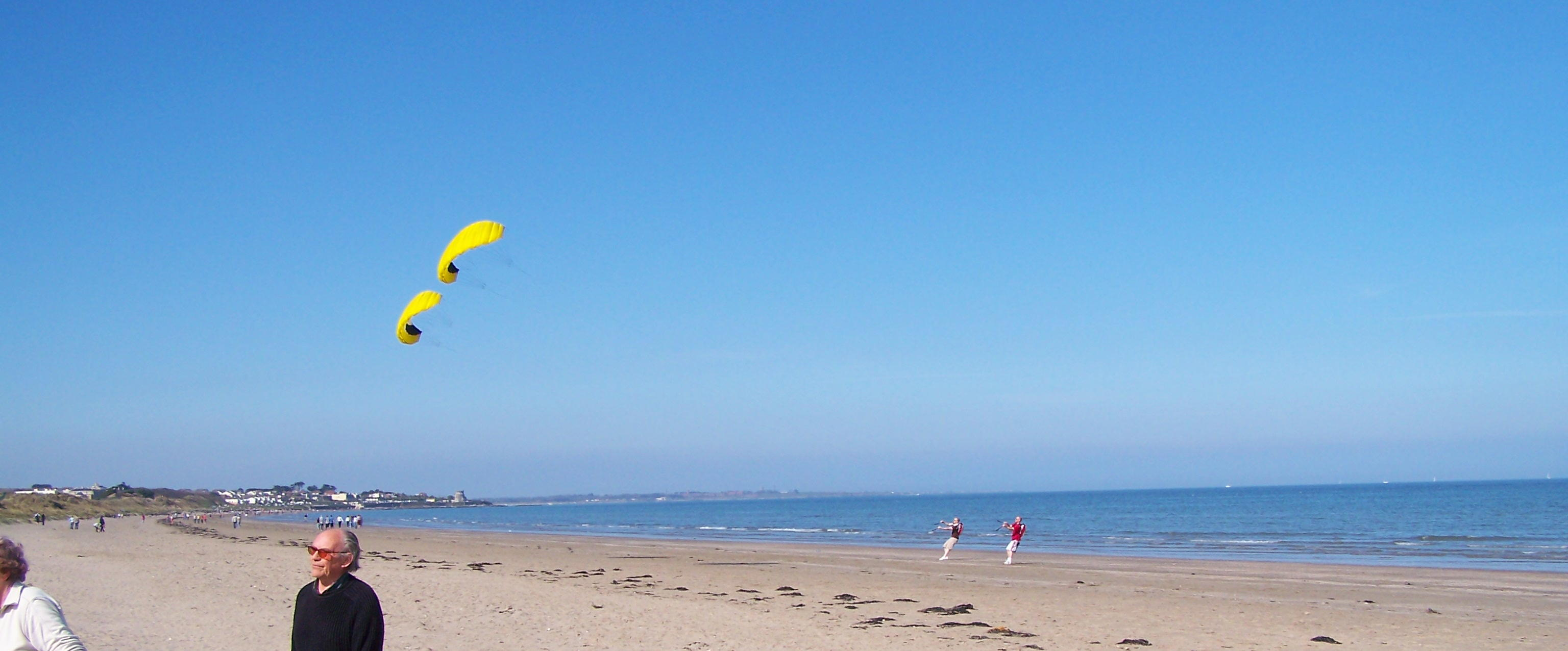
Kites in the sky on Portmarnock beach

Adjacent to Portmarnock is a narrow beach which extends onto a sandy peninsula with beaches on all sides. Portmarnock's beach is nicknamed the Velvet Strand due to the smooth sand along the beach, and is popular with wind- and kite-surfers.

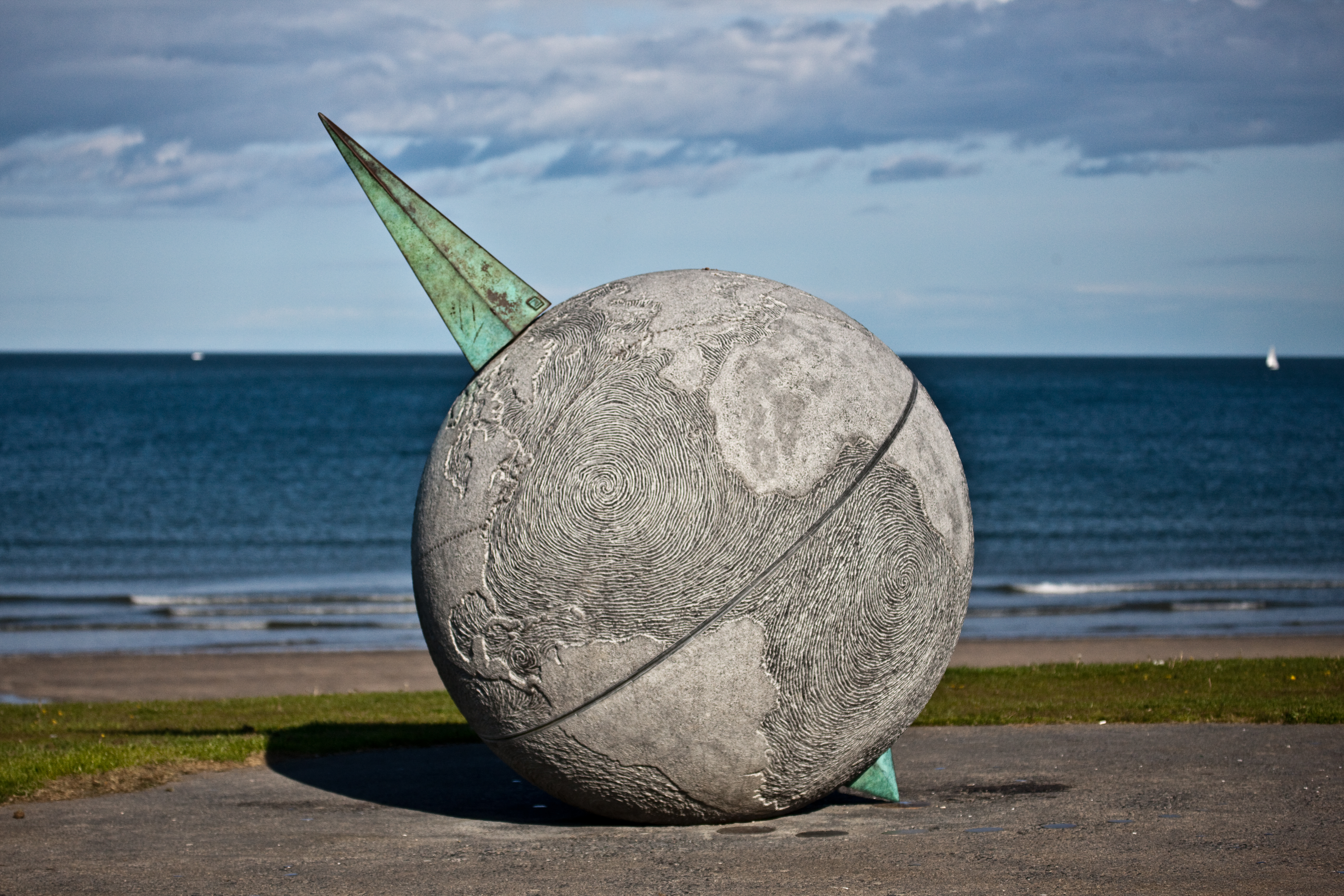
Southern Cross monument

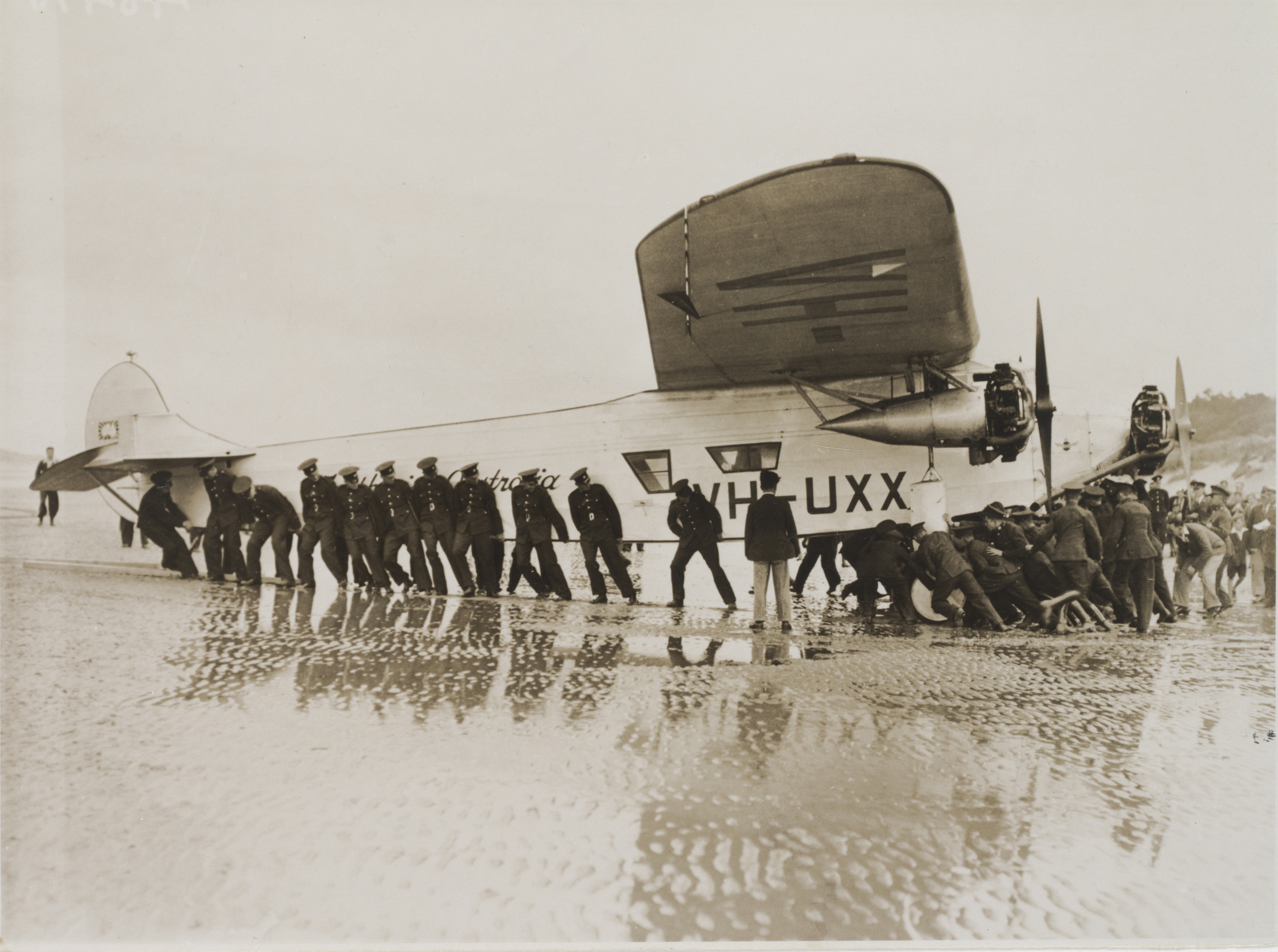
'Faith in Australia' after accident, Portmarnock Beach, Ireland, 1933

The beach was the starting point for two important pioneering flights. On 23 June 1930, Australian aviator Charles Kingsford Smith and his crew took off in the Southern Cross on the second westbound transatlantic flight (to Newfoundland), after which they continued on to Oakland, California, completing a circumnavigation of the world. The first solo westbound transatlantic flight began from Portmarnock beach when Jim Mollison, a British pilot, took off in a de Havilland Puss Moth on 18 August 1932 bound for Pennfield Ridge, New Brunswick, Canada.

The sculpture Eccentric Orbit (by Rachel Joynt and Remco de Fouw, erected 2002) on the seafront is of limestone, bronze and stainless steel. The needle points to the North Star, an age-old navigation point. The sculpture commemorates the epic flights of the Southern Cross (the second non-stop east–west North Atlantic flight, in 1930), the Heart's Content (the first east–west non-stop solo North Atlantic flight, 1932) and the abandoned solo North-Atlantic flight of Faith in Australia (1933).

Portmarnock is home to one of the 29 Napoleonic Martello Towers in the Greater Dublin Area.

== Etymology and history ==
The district's name derives from the Irish word port – meaning "port" – and Saint Marnoch or Mernoc, said to have arrived in what is now Portmarnock in the fifth century AD.

The area had been settled in Neolithic times, as evidenced by flints and other tools excavated on the northern fringe of Portmarnock and the remains of a ring fort visible from the air at the south of the town. The son of Queen Maedhbh of Connaught – Maine – is also said to have been buried locally.

In the early 20th century, Portmarnock became known for its brickworks which were owned by the Plunkett family.

During the Irish War of Independence, Michael Collins stayed at the Portmarnock house of Moya Llewelyn Davies, using it as a safe house.

In February 1988, An Garda Siochána discovered a Provisional IRA arms cache at Station Road. 30 AK-47s, 3 machine gun tripods, 12 RPGs, 31,000 rounds of ammunition and 227 kg of Semtex was discovered.

== Transport ==
Portmarnock is on the northern commuter railway line out of Dublin (also the Dublin–Belfast main line); Portmarnock railway station, opened on 25 May 1844 upon the opening of the Dublin and Drogheda Railway, and is now on the DART network. The village is served by Dublin Bus routes 32, 32X, 42, 42N (Nitelink) and 142 and Go-Ahead Ireland routes 102 and its a/c/p/t branches. Owing to its proximity to Dublin city, it is a form of dormitory village 15 km (9.3 mi) north-northeast of the city centre.

== Education ==
There are two primary schools – St. Marnock's and St. Helen's – and also a secondary school, Portmarnock Community School.

== Religion ==
Situated on the coast of Portmarnock are the ruins of the old Saint Marnock's Church, with an adjacent cemetery.

Today, Portmarnock holds a Roman Catholic parish and the church of St Anne.

The Church of Ireland parish of Portmarnock was united with Malahide in 1873, and the newer St Marnock's Church, consecrated in 1790 after being rebuilt under the direction of the architect Francis Sandys, operated up until 1960; parishioners are now served by churches in Malahide and north of Balgriffin.

== Sport ==
Portmarnock is famous for the golf links at Portmarnock Golf Club, which formally opened on 26 December 1894. Occupying much of the sandy peninsula to the south of the village, the club has hosted many golf tournaments, including the 1960 Canada Cup, 1991 Walker Cup and the Irish Open on many occasions. In 1995, a golf resort opened just north of Portmarnock Golf Club under the name "Portmarnock Hotel & Golf Links", including its own links course designed by Bernhard Langer, and incorporating St. Marnock's House, designed by Sir Robert Lorimer in the 1890s for the Jameson family of distillers. There was potential confusion for golf tourists between the old "Portmarnock Golf Club" and the new "Portmarnock Golf Links". In 2023, after a course redesign, the resort's new owners changed its name to "Portmarnock Resort & Jameson Golf Links".

Naomh Mearnóg is the local Gaelic Athletic Association club, with Trinity Gaels GAA having their main grounds in Drumnigh, on the edge of Portmarnock.

Other local sports clubs include Portmarnock Tennis Club, Portmarnock A.F.C., in the Saturday divisions of the Leinster Senior League, and the Portmarnock Sport & Leisure Club, which encompasses 16 sporting activities and has a swimming pool with some public access hours.

Portmarnock Pitch & Putt Club was founded in 1958 and moved to its current location in 1961. It has been affiliated with the Pitch and Putt Union of Ireland since its foundation in 1961 and is currently a members club with over 400 adult and 120 under-16 members in 2023.

== Representation ==
Portmarnock lies in the Dublin Fingal East Dáil constituency and in the modern administrative county of Fingal. Before 2016 it was in the Dublin North-East constituency.

== Notable people ==
- Eamonn Andrews, broadcaster, lived in Portmarnock from 1969 to his death in 1987
- Joanna Donnelly, weather forecaster, resident
- Oisin Fagan, Irish boxer, lived in Portmarnock
- Ian Garry, mixed martial artist and former Cage Warriors welterweight champion, was born and grew up in Portmarnock
- David Hickey, sportsman and transplant surgeon, lives in Portmarnock.
- Brian McFadden, musician and former Westlife singer, lived in Portmarnock until 2004, when he emigrated to the UK with his Australian then-fiancée Delta Goodrem
- Laurence O'Neill, Lord Mayor of Dublin, Senator and TD.
- Stephen Ward, international footballer, grew up in Portmarnock
- Marty Whelan, radio and television personality, lived with his family in Portmarnock for 25 years before relocating to the nearby village of Malahide

== Twinning ==
Portmarnock is twinned with the following places:

- Hlalele Secondary School, Maseru District, Lesotho

== See also ==
- List of towns and villages in Ireland
