= Mountrath Community School =

Secondary school in Mountrath, County Laois, Ireland

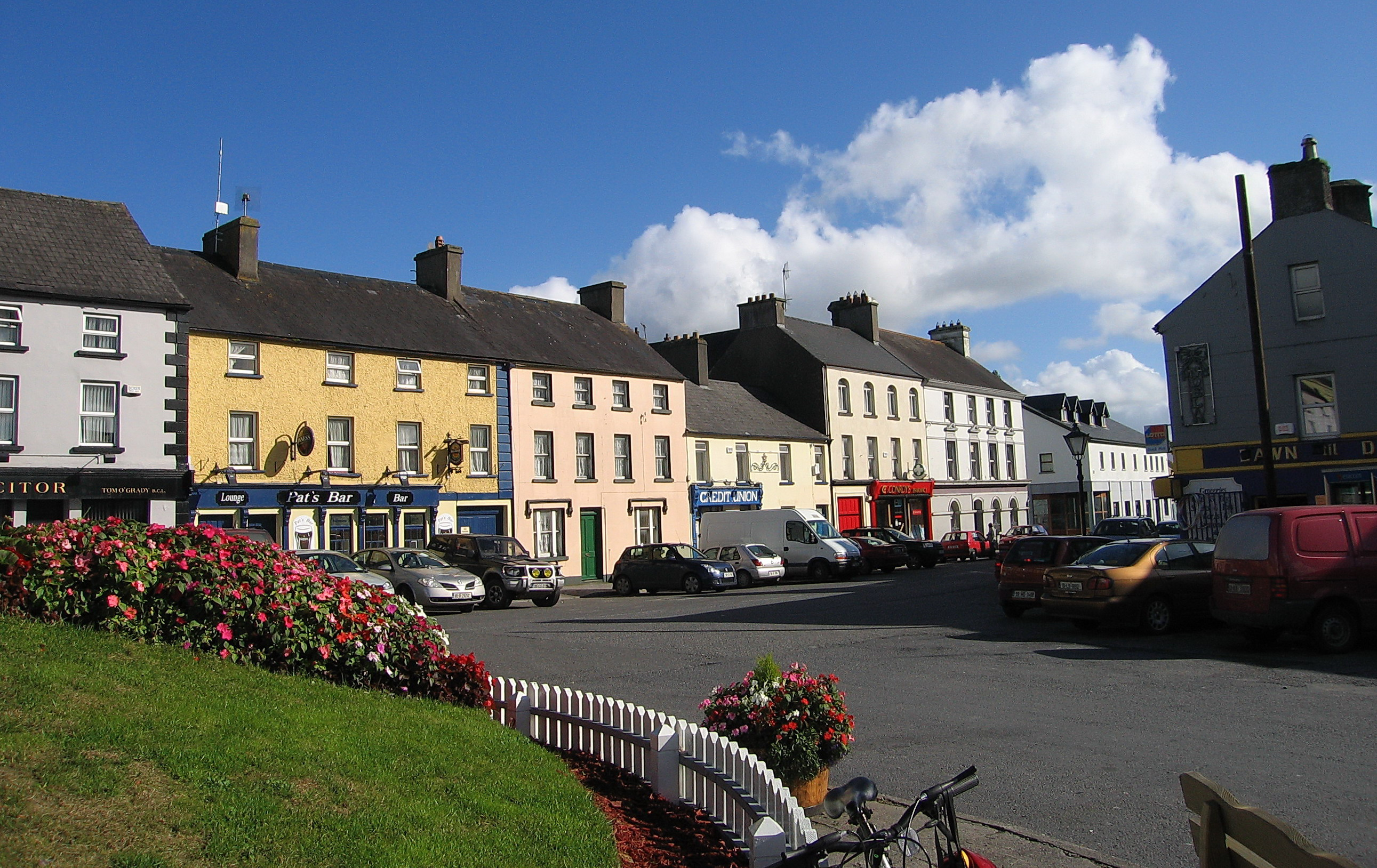
- Mountrath Community School in Mountrath

Location
- Mountrath, County Laois; Ireland
- Coordinates: 53.0011°N 7.4742°W

Information
- School type: Secondary school (community school)
- Established: 2009
- Principal: Katherine O'Brien
- Gender: Mixed
- Enrollment: approx. 700
- Website: http://mountrathcs.ie/

Mountrath Community School (Irish: Pobalscoil Maighean Rátha) is a secondary school in Mountrath, County Laois in Ireland.

It is an amalgamation of three former secondary schools (namely the Bridgidine Convent, St Aengus Vocational School, and Patrician College) all of which closed in 2009 and reopened as a combined school in September 2009. The Patrician Brothers and Le Chéile Trust, the Brigidine Sisters and the Laois Vocational Education Committee are the trustees of the community school.
