= Gorey Community School =

School in County Wexford, Ireland

- Pobalscoil Ghuaire

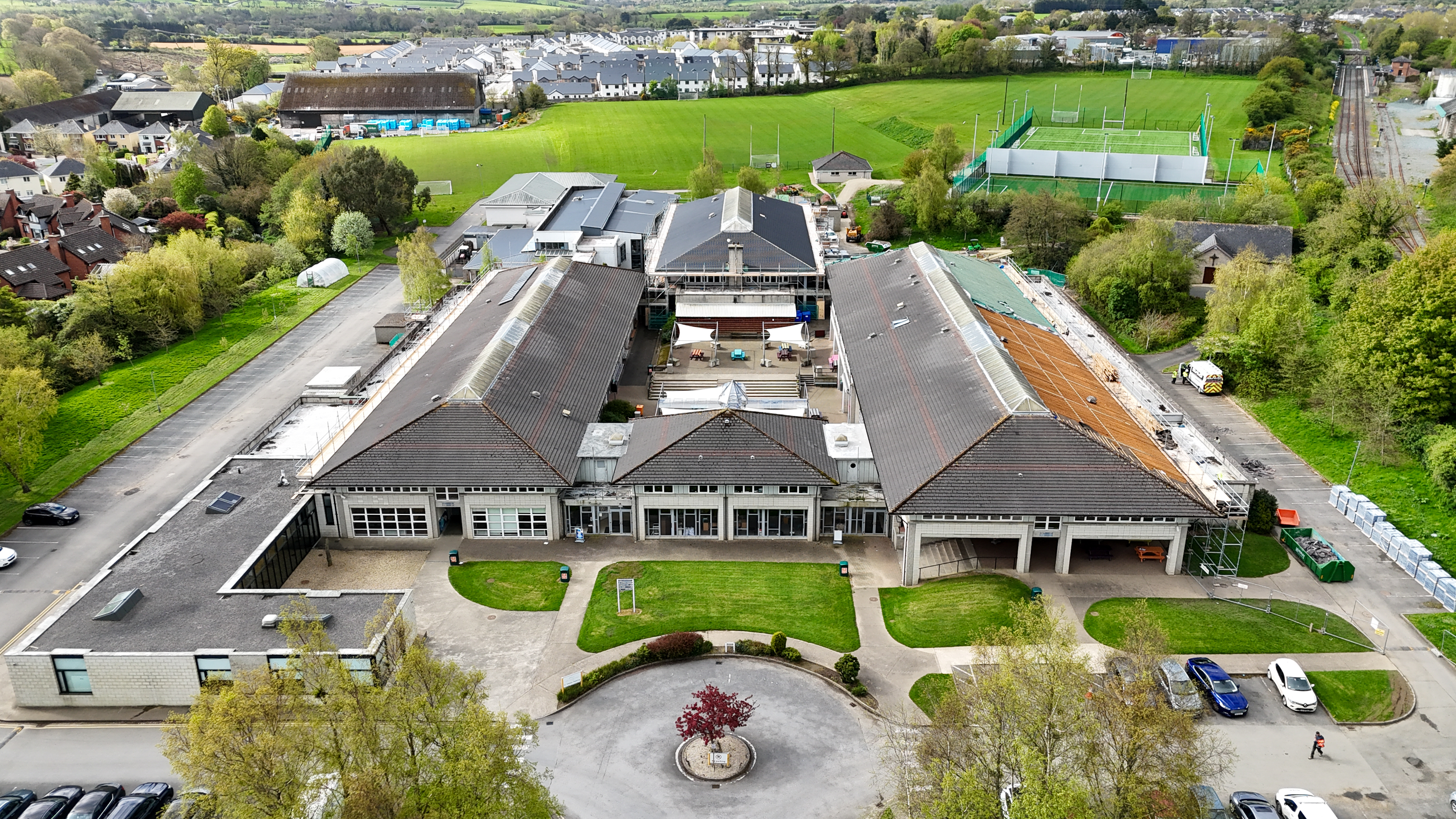

Location
- Esmonde St, Mill Lands, Gorey
- 52.6735°N 6.2874°W

Information
- Type: Community school
- Established: 1993
- Principal: Michael Finn
- Enrollment: approx. 1,540 (2025)
- Website: GoreyCS.ie

Gorey Community School is a secondary school in Gorey, County Wexford, Ireland. It is the largest school in Ireland, and (as of 2025) had over 1500 students enrolled.

== History ==
Gorey Community School was established in 1993, following the amalgamation of the nearby Christian Brothers School (CBS), Vocational College and Loreto Abbey schools. When the amalgamated school first opened, it had 1297 students enrolled. As of 2025, the school had a student population of over 1500, and a teaching staff of more than 100.

The school occupies a large site of almost 20 acres (81,000 m^{2}) which comprises playing fields, basketball courts, and tennis courts. In 2000 a new extension was opened. The construction of a further extension began in September 2007 and was completed in October 2008. There are now over 90 classrooms, several specialist rooms, special needs facilities and a large gymnasium. Yet another extension was opened in 2012. After several years of fundraising, an oratory was built in 2004. With seating for over 200 people, school masses, memorial services, parent meetings are held in the oratory.

Gorey Community School (GCS) is managed by a board of management, which includes 6 representatives from the trustees (the Vocational Education Committee, the Loreto order and the CBS), two teachers representatives and two parents representatives).

== Activities ==
GCS participates in a number of sports, including Gaelic games, soccer, rugby and athletics.

The school coordinates a number of student exchanges with other secondary-level schools in Spain, Italy, France and Germany.
