= Thamesmead School =

Location
- Manygate Lane; Shepperton, Surrey, TW17 9EE; England
- 51.3944°N 0.4420°W

Information
- Type: Academy
- Motto: Where Learning Comes First
- Department for Education URN: 137237 Tables
- Ofsted: Reports
- Headteacher: Phil Reeves
- Gender: Mixed
- Age: 11 to 16
- Enrolment: 1017
- Houses: Centaur, Dragon, Griffin, Phoenix
- Colours: Red and black
- Publication: Thamesmead Talk
- Website: thamesmead.surrey.sch.uk

Thamesmead School is a secondary academy school for boys and girls located in Shepperton, England. It is for students aged 11 to 16, and does not have a sixth form.

== Houses ==
The school is divided into year groups for tutor time, with school house and school year affecting a student's placing.

There are four school houses, Centaur, Dragon, Phoenix and Griffin, each being composed of students from all year groups. Before 2013 Centaur, Dragon, Phoenix and Griffin houses were known as Aylward, Newton, Keller and Brunel respectively.

== Uniform ==
The school uniform is a white shirt, a Black Blazer With The Schools Logo On, black trousers or school skirt, red Clip on tie with house colours and black shoes. The full uniform policy is on the school website.

== GCSE results ==
In 2015-16 81% of students achieved five A*-C grades including English and maths - a further 2% rise on the previous year's results. In addition to outstanding results in English, maths and science, students achieved particularly well in the performing arts, physical education, ICT, art and modern foreign languages.

Thamesmead has been highly commended for excellent improvement in GCSE results between 2013 and 2015.

Ofsted visited the school in 2017.

== Notable alumni ==
- Richard Archer - lead singer for the chart topping band HARD-Fi
- Kirsty Capes - novelist
- Rohan Ince - footballer who plays for Football League Championship club Brighton and Hove Albion as a holding midfielder
