= Mícheál Ó Súilleabháin (writer) =

Mícheál Ó Súilleabháin (pronounced [ˈmʲiːçaːl̪ˠ oː ˈsˠuːl̠ʲəwaːnʲ]; 21 February 1917 – 4 November 2004) was an Irish writer.

Ó Súilleabháin was a school teacher and inspector. He wrote the Irish Language novels Créamaraí, An Fear Aduaidh and Peacaí na nAthaireacha. His granddaughter is writer, actress and comedian Aisling Bea.
