= Kildare Town Community School =

Location
- Kildare, County Kildare; Ireland
- 53.1697°N 6.9146°W

Information
- Type: Secondary school
- Established: 2011
- Website: www.ktcs.ie

Kildare Town Community School is a community school in Kildare town, County Kildare in Ireland. It was formed in September 2011 following the amalgamation of St. Josephs Academy, Presentation Secondary School and Kildare Vocational School. The school is under the patronage of the Diocese of Kildare and Leighlin, and Kildare Vocational Education Committee. It was officially opened by then Taoiseach, Enda Kenny.

As of 2025, the principal was John Hayes and there were approximately 1,000 students attending the school.
