= A Young Doctor's Notebook (TV series) =

British dark comedy television programme

- Series one DVD cover, featuring Hamm (left) and Radcliffe (right)
- Also known as: Playhouse Presents: A Young Doctor's Notebook, A Young Doctor's Notebook & Other Stories
- Genre: British dark comedy
- Based on: A Young Doctor's Notebook by Mikhail Bulgakov
- Written by: Mark Chappell; Alan Connor; Shaun Pye
- Directed by: Alex Hardcastle (series 1); Robert McKillop (series 2)
- Starring: Jon Hamm; Daniel Radcliffe
- Composer: Stephen Warbeck
- Country of origin: United Kingdom
- Original language: English
- No. of series: 2
- No. of episodes: 8

Production
- Executive producers: Kenton Allen; Jon Hamm; Saskia Schuster (series 1); Lucy Lumsden; Matthew Justice; Dan Cheesbrough; Jon Mountague (series 2)
- Producer: Clelia Mountford
- Editor: Mark Henson
- Running time: 30 min. (with commercials)
- Production companies: Big Talk Productions; Points West Pictures

Original release
- Network: Sky Arts 1; Sky Arts HD
- Release: 6 December 2012 – 12 December 2013

A Young Doctor's Notebook is a British dark comedy television programme based on the semi-autobiographical short stories of the same name by Mikhail Bulgakov. The 1925–1926 short stories were inspired by Bulgakov's experiences as a newly graduated young doctor in 1916–18. Jon Hamm and Daniel Radcliffe portray the show's main character (a doctor at the fictional Muryevo Hospital in Russia at different ages). The first series was broadcast between 6 December and 27 December 2012 on Sky Arts 1, and a second (and final) series aired from 21 November to 12 December 2013. The first series takes place in the year 1917 during the Russian Revolution, and the second series takes place in the following year during the Russian Civil War.

== Production ==
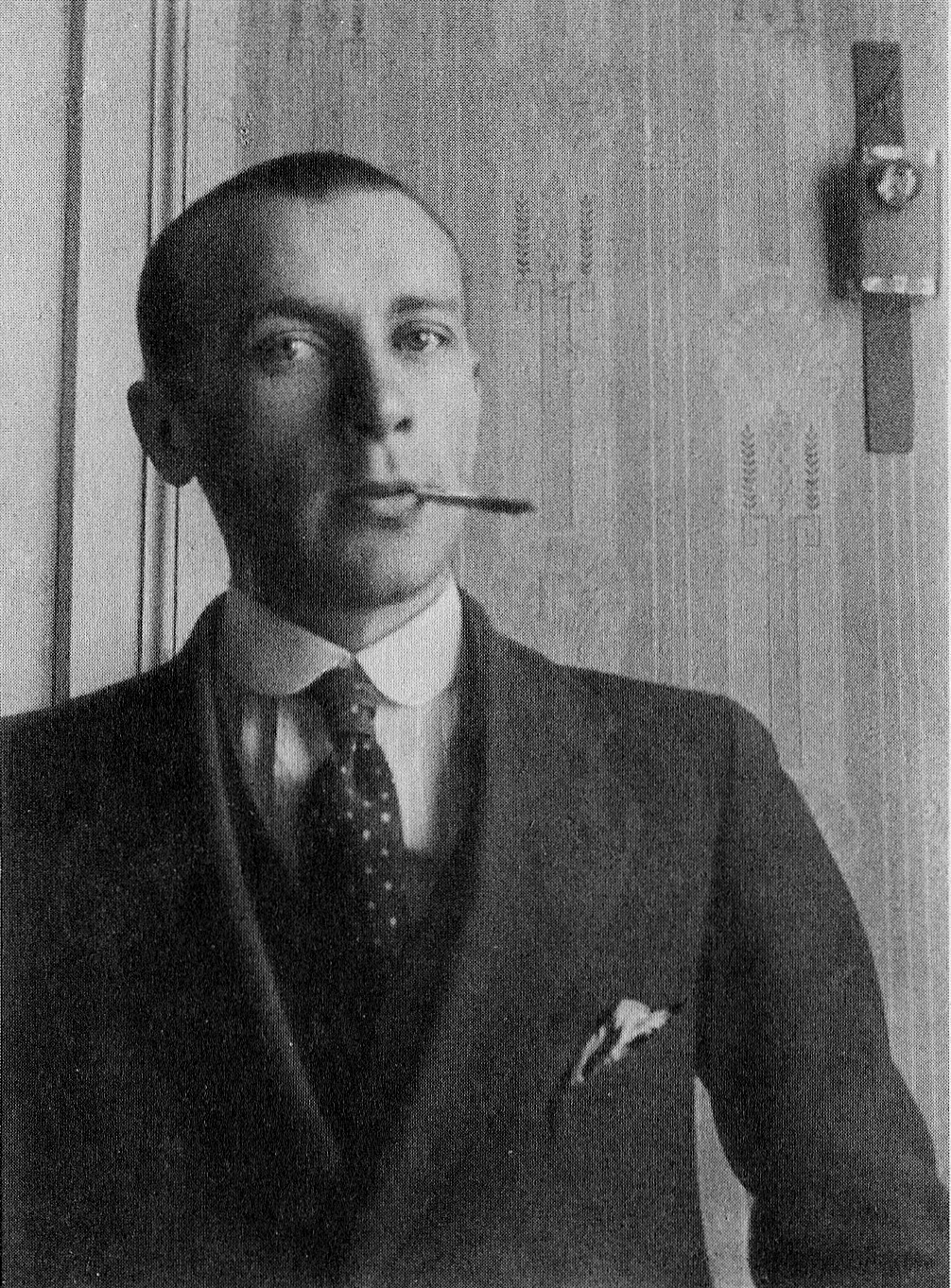
Mikhail Bulgakov (pictured in the 1910s) wrote the short story collection A Young Doctor's Notebook, drawing upon his own experiences as a newly graduated doctor in 1916–1918, practicing in a small village hospital in Smolensk Governorate and his addiction to morphine and subsequent rehabilitation.

The second series is based on the short story titled "Morphine" by Bulgakov. The title cards and credits use faux Cyrillic. The music for the programme was composed by Stephen Warbeck. It features violin, a clarinet, acoustic guitar, and cello. The theme song was featured on Sky Arts' compilation album Sky Theme Tunes, Vol. 2.

== Series overview ==
Dr. Vladimir Bomgard leads a team at the fictional Muryevo Hospital in Russia. The team consists of Pelageya Ivanovna (Rosie Cavaliero), a junior midwife; Demyan Lukich (Adam Godley), a feldsher; and Anna Nikolayevna (Vicki Pepperdine), a senior midwife. The typical episode follows the team in their attempts to treat patients' illnesses. Bomgard contends with the uneducated populace, which refuses his treatment. He regularly provides them with rapid and accurate diagnoses.

Bomgard has a physical relationship with Pelageya. In the third episode, they have sex for the first time. In the second series, they try being a couple, and make their relationship work. In the sixth episode, Bomgard tells Pelageya he never loved her, and they separate.

A Young Doctor's Notebook is set in the fictional town of Muryevo, Korobovo in Russia. The first series takes place in the year 1917 during the Russian Revolution, and the second series takes place in the following year during the Russian Civil War. The programme also takes place in the years 1934 and 1935. The show's main character reads his old diary and recalls his experiences, interjecting himself into the story of his younger self. The doctor interacts with his younger self, having conversations that reveal aspects of the story yet to unfold.

In the second series, the Russian Civil War begins to affect the fictional Muryevo Hospital, as an influx of wounded soldiers from both the Bolsheviks and the White Guard arrive for treatment. Meanwhile, the young doctor is battling an all-encompassing morphine addiction. His older self stands watch over him, and a young aristocrat named Natasha arrives in the hospital. The young doctor takes an intense, destructive interest in Natasha. At the same time, the Feldsher takes a romantic interest in a tall, moustached Colonel of the White Guard, who is also staying in the hospital. They are both fond of each other, and share a love for pickled sprats. At one point, the Feldsher is seen bringing him a bouquet of flowers. The Colonel reciprocates.

A significant plot element is Bomgard's use of morphine to manage both his psychological pain caused by living in a remote and isolated community, and his severe abdominal pain of unclear origin (although Bomgard suggested it was possibly an ulcer or appendicitis). When he has no access to morphine, he occasionally self-medicates with cocaine. Bomgard also frequently chain smokes when he is on medical duty. In the first series finale, the young doctor reacts to mercy killing by taking morphine, and his addiction recurs. At the close of the first series finale, the young doctor begins to hallucinate. His addiction leads to conflicts with Pelageya. In the last episode, the young doctor admits he is addicted to morphine, describing himself as a "hopeless addict". In the first series, the older doctor is under investigation for writing false prescriptions for morphine for himself, before he attempts suicide via overdose, and is incarcerated as a result. At the opening of the second series premier, the older and rehabilitated Doctor Bomgard is released from a mental institution, with his addiction under control.

The young doctor is constantly reminded of the former doctor Leopold Leopoldovich's austere presence through comments comparing them by the midwives, and the several large, foreboding portraits of Leopold sporting a huge beard on the walls of the medical practice. The young doctor often feels insecure and inadequate when faced with Leopoldovich's reputation and skills, which grows into resentful annoyance.

== Cast ==
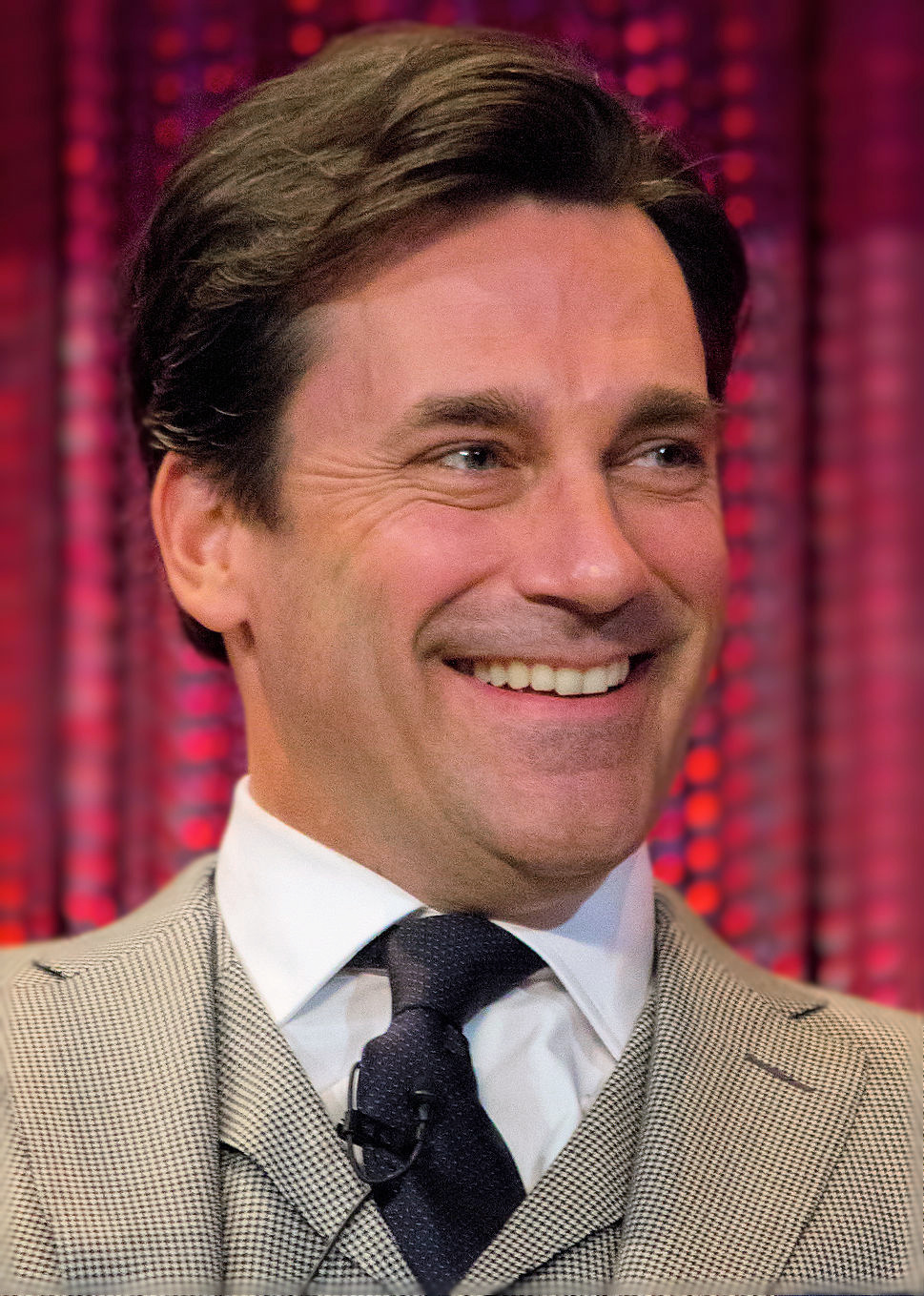
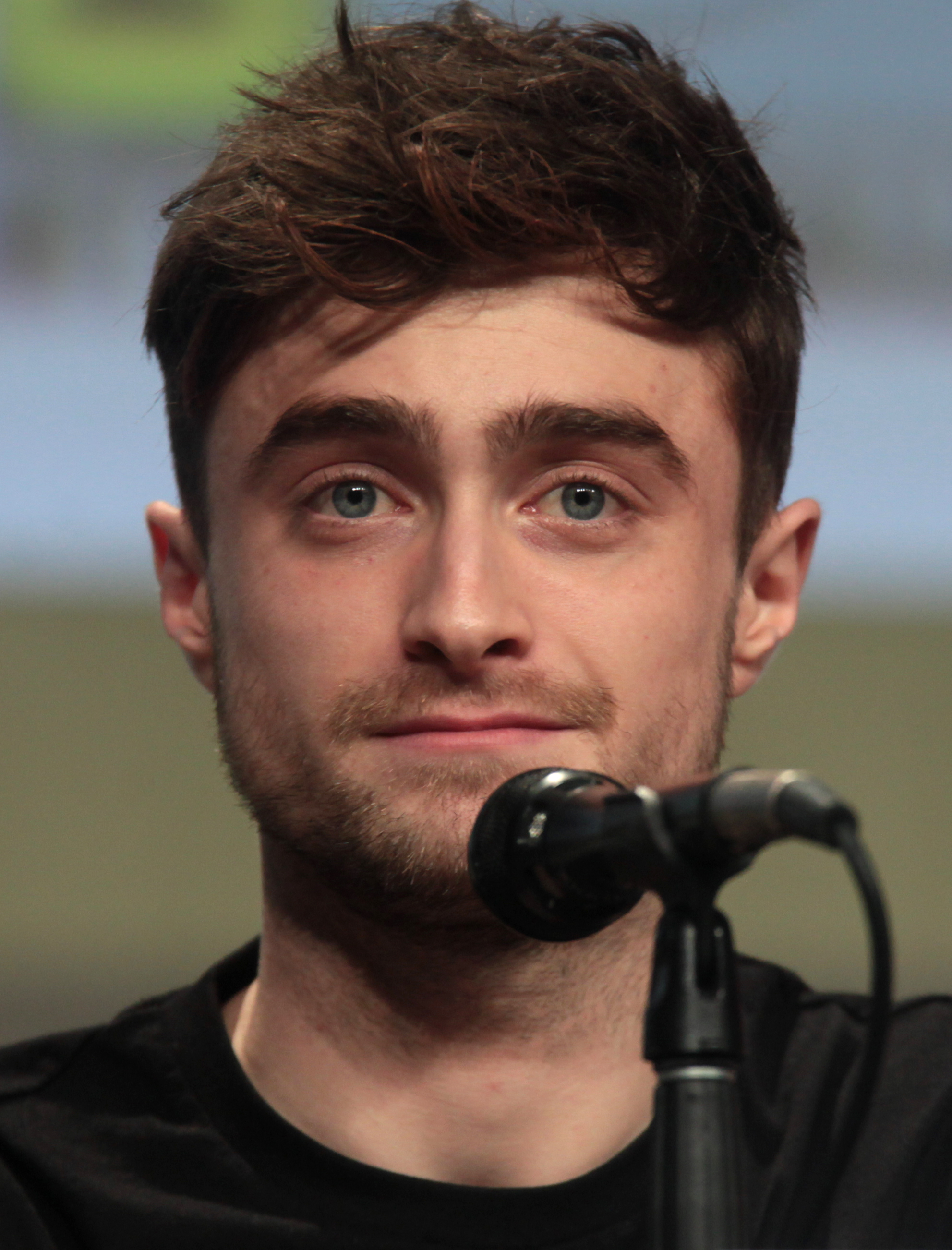
Jon Hamm (left) and Daniel Radcliffe (right) portray the show's main character, Dr. Vladimir "Nika" Bomgard, at different ages

All five of the main actors appeared in every episode. All five play staff who work at the fictional Muryevo Hospital in Russia. Jon Hamm and Daniel Radcliffe received star billing.

- Jon Hamm as the older Dr. Vladimir "Nika" Bomgard. The older doctor fails to prevent his younger self from making the mistakes he currently regrets.
- Daniel Radcliffe as the young Dr. Vladimir "Nika" Bomgard. A graduate at the top of his class at the Moscow State University of Medicine and Dentistry, he arrives at the hospital, idealistic, and with no practical experience. In the face of ignorant patients, an endless workload of hopeless cases, little support, a personal illness, and extreme isolation, the young doctor quickly degrades into apathy and despair. The young doctor struggles all the while, gradually descending from chain smoking into morphine addiction.
- Rosie Cavaliero as Pelageya Ivanovna, a junior midwife. She is brusquely kind.
- Adam Godley as Demyan Lukich, a feldsher. Trained as a field doctor, he practices as the doctor's assistant during operations. He smokes a tobacco pipe, and is fond of pickled sprats and atlases. The young doctor views Lukich as socially inappropriate and annoying, though well-intentioned.
- Vicki Pepperdine as Anna Nikolayevna, a senior midwife. She is very stern, and treats the doctor as a child because of his age and inexperience. She has a loving devotion to Leopold Leopoldovitch, the much-admired, much-accomplished previous doctor, and often compares Bomgard to him or cites his many accomplishments.

Despite the programme's short run, several recurring characters emerged:

- Christopher Godwin as Leopold Leopoldovitch, the former doctor at the hospital. He has an austere presence and high reputation and skills. He appears in hallucinations in the final two episodes of the first series.
- Shaun Pye as Yegorych. He appears in three episodes of series one.
- Tim Steed as NKVD Agent Kirill, who investigates the older doctor on behalf of the law enforcement agency. He appears in all four episodes of series one.
- Margaret Clunie as Natasha, a beautiful young aristocrat who arrives at the clinic during the war. She appears in the final three episodes of the second series.
- Charles Edwards as the Colonel. He appears in the final three episodes of the second series.
- Tom Forbes as Anatoliy. He appears in the final three episodes of the second series.
- Daniel Cerqueira as Vlas, a morphine addict-hating vagrant travelling by train with the older doctor. He appears in all four episodes of series two.

== Episodes ==
=== Series 1: A Young Doctor's Notebook... (2012) ===
No. overall	No. in series	Title	Original release date	U.K. viewers
1	1	"Episode One"	6 December 2012	584,000
The older doctor, Dr. Vladimir Bomgard, is under investigation and stumbles upon his journal. In flashback, the young doctor, a recent graduate from Moscow State University of Medicine and Dentistry, arrives at the remote village of Muryevo to run a small hospital. He becomes acquainted with the senior midwife Anna, junior midwife Pelageya and "The Feldsher". His first patient arrives in the middle of his first night: a pregnant peasant with transverse lie. He comes to the realization that even with his "15 5s" (excellent grades), he still lacks real-world experience.
2	2	"Episode Two"	13 December 2012	317,000
The young doctor begins to lose hope that he can heal the world "one peasant at a time" as he contends with the harsh realities of his medical practice. Locals soon attempt to take advantage of his inexperience. The young doctor also struggles to fight a syphilis epidemic because the generally uneducated locals refuse treatment. The young doctor's lofty aspirations to better the community disappear after he is forced to perform a gruesome amputation on a young girl.
3	3	"Episode Three"	20 December 2012	251,000
Despite the young doctor's initial successes in the operating theatre, the isolation of living in the remote town causes him to grow increasingly reserved and introspective. He suffers severe abdominal pains, which go untreated, and he spends long portions of his time staring out into the snow. The young doctor uses morphine to dull his pain, which eventually leads to him developing an addiction.
4	4	"Episode Four"	27 December 2012	313,000
After his recent operating successes, a large number of people are drawn to the hospital. He struggles with the workload and concealing the effects of his morphine use from his colleagues. Noticing the prevalence of syphilis in the surrounding villages, he begins an attempt to control the epidemic. Following one house-call where he fails to save a dying patient and instead euthanizes her, he regresses into his addiction and abandons hope for his own progress.

=== Series 2: ...& Other Stories (2013) ===
No. overall	No. in series	Title	Original release date	UK viewers
5	1	"Episode One"	21 November 2013	187,000
It's 1918 and civil war rages throughout Russia, but has yet to reach the remote hospital in Mureyvo. The young doctor and Pelageya are in a relationship, albeit one based primarily on the fact she is able to both facilitate and conceal his morphine addiction. In 1935, an upbeat, rehabilitated older doctor is discharged from the Moscow institution he was sent to at the end of series one. He returns to his memories of 1918 through his journal, no longer sneering towards his younger self, who he has forgiven. The hospital staff learns that the Zemstvo is making an inspection, sending the young doctor and Pelageya into a panic over the morphine shortfall. Under the disapproving eyes of the older doctor, they cover their tracks by re-filling the morphine bottles with water. The arrival of a group of injured Bolshevik soldiers tests the young doctor's skills.
6	2	"Episode Two"	28 November 2013	85,000
The older doctor travels by train with Vlas, a morphine-addict-hating vagrant. In 1918, the young doctor is attempting to hide the missing morphine when the White Guard arrive at the hospital, asking for medical assistance. The beautiful aristocrat Natasha is part of the group, accompanied by her brother (an injured soldier), and the young doctor falls for her, flirting towards her for a period. After accidentally shooting himself in the foot while drunk, the young doctor confesses his feelings to Natasha, but she is betrothed to a Russian General (who bears a striking resemblance to Leopold Leopoldovich) stationed in Paris. Though he fantasizes about her, and leaves Pelageya to make himself available for her, she views him as a child. Pelageya falls ill but the doctor ignores her illness.
7	3	"Episode Three"	5 December 2013	69,000
Pelageya is on her sick bed with typhus while the young doctor's infatuation with Natasha grows. The Feldsher and the colonel discover a badly wounded White Guard soldier and Natasha is eager to know if he has any information about her fiancé. The young doctor uses the injured soldier's news to fabricate a story that the general died while fleeing battle. The young doctor tries to entice Natasha to visit his room; the older doctor looks on, wishing his younger self would tend to Pelageya, noting that his obsession with Natasha is as self-destructive as his addiction to morphine. The young doctor finally visits Pelageya, but behaves with cold indifference and the older doctor is appalled at the callousness of his younger self.
8	4	"Episode Four"	12 December 2013	113,000
Pelageya dies, and the young doctor absolves himself of blame in a self-serving eulogy at her funeral. An explosion rocks the hospital as the Bolsheviks return. The young doctor pathetically attempts to persuade Natasha to stay. In desperation, he reveals that he lied to her about her fiancé. They have a falling out and she leaves. When the Bolshevik soldiers arrive, the young doctor reveals that Natasha and the White Guard are heading for a medical supply train to escape. The young doctor heads through the snow with the Feldsher to warn Natasha, but they arrive to find the train derailed by a massive explosion. The young doctor finds an injured Natasha, but also discovers a large supply of morphine. Fire spreads to Natasha's carriage, and the young doctor chooses to steal the morphine rather than take a risk at saving Natasha, who burns to death. The Feldsher is killed during the fighting between Red and White forces near Muryevo.

A half-hour behind the scenes documentary immediately followed the last episode on Sky Arts 1 on 12 December 2013.

== Reception ==
- "5 Days"; The young doctor (Radcliffe) examines a dying woman. Taken from episode 3.
- "Pathetic and Weak"; The young doctor (Radcliffe) and the older doctor (Hamm) struggle with morphine addiction. Taken from episode 4.

The average viewing for the first series was 252,000 people making it the most watched programme on Sky Arts 1 at the time of its airing. It was well received by critics, and was nominated for the Magnolia Award for Best Television Film or Miniseries at the 19th Shanghai Television Festival in 2013, as well as for the Satellite Award for Best Television Series – Musical or Comedy at the 18th Satellite Awards in 2014.

== Release ==
The first series was broadcast in the United States between 2 October and 23 October 2013 on Ovation, and a second series aired from 19 August to 9 September 2014.

== See also ==
- Morphine, 2008 Russian film based on the same Bulgakov short stories.
