= Spring Day (disambiguation) =

Spring Day is a holiday, celebrated in several countries, marking the coming of the spring season.

Spring Day may also refer to:

- Spring Day (comedian), American comedian, writer, and actor
- Spring Day (Pozdneev), a 1959 painting by Nikolai Pozdneev
- "Spring Day" (song), a 2017 song by BTS
- Spring Day (TV series), a 2005 South Korean television drama
- Spring Day (film), a 2022 South Korean film

== See also ==
- Spring Festival (disambiguation)
