= Jessica Hynes =

British actress and writer

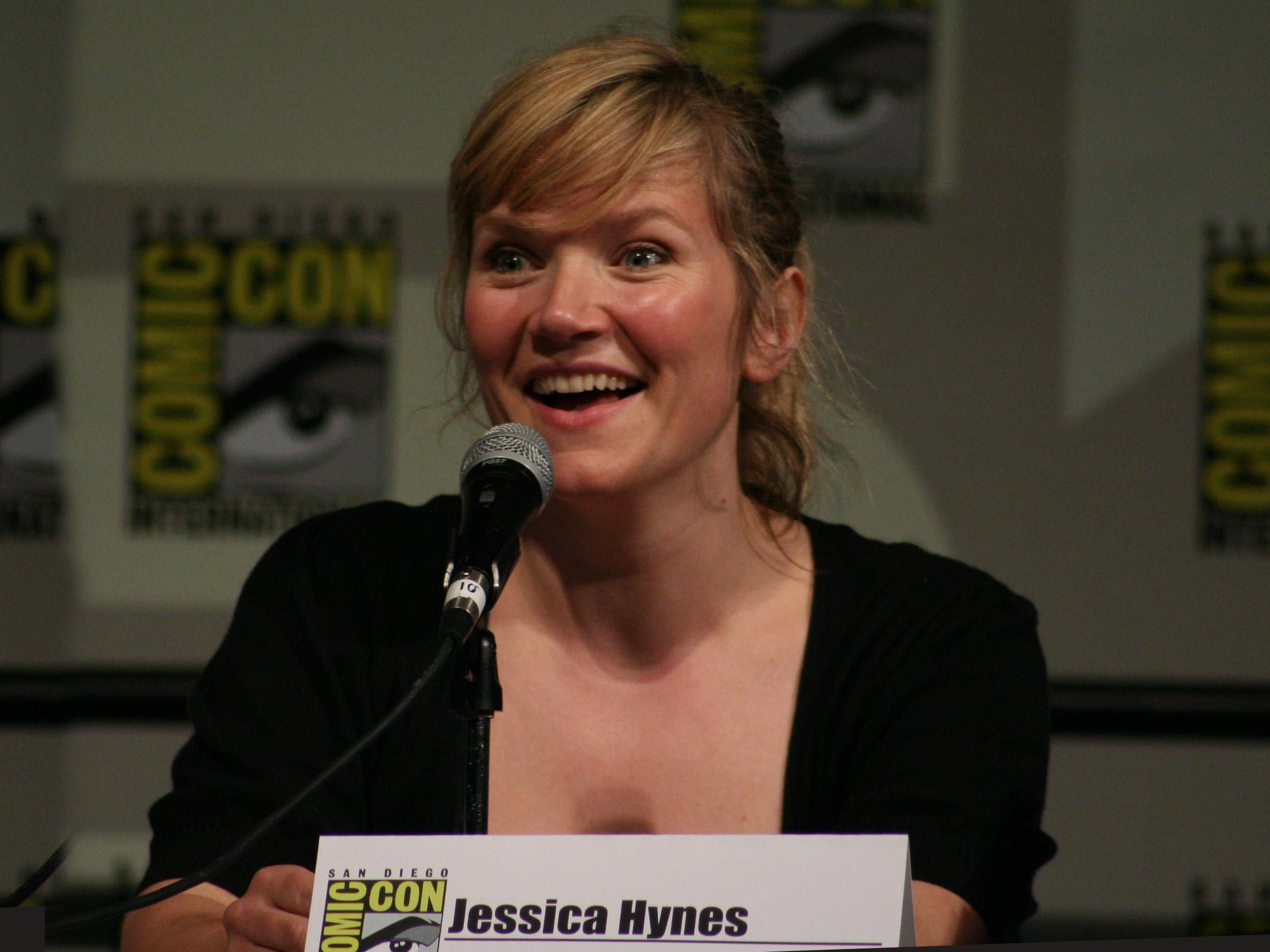
- Hynes at the 2008 San Diego Comic-Con
- Born: Jessica Stevenson; 30 October 1972 (age 53); Lewisham, London, England
- Occupations: Actress; director; writer
- Years active: 1993–present
- Spouse: Adam Hynes (m. 2002)
- Children: 3

Jessica Hynes (née Stevenson) is an English actress, director and writer. Best known as a comedy actress, she has played Cheryl in The Royle Family (1998–2010), Siobhan Sharpe in Twenty Twelve (2011–2012) and W1A (2014–2017) and Emily Yates in There She Goes (2018–2023). She was also one of the stars, creators and writers of Spaced (1999–2001). She has also had starring roles in television film Tomorrow La Scala! and BBC dramas Years and Years (2019) and Miss Austen (2025). In film, Hynes has appeared in the Bridget Jones (2004–2016), Nativity (2012–2018) and Paddington (2017–2024) film series.

Hynes has been nominated for two International Emmy Awards, a Tony Award, a Laurence Olivier Award, five BAFTAs (winning two), three Royal Television Society Awards (winning two) and three British Comedy Awards (winning two).

== Early life and education ==
Hynes was born Jessica Stevenson in Lewisham, London, and grew up in Brighton, where she attended St Luke's Infant and Junior Schools and Dorothy Stringer School. After her parents split up, she was raised by her mother. She moved back to London as a young adult. Her maternal grandmother came from the village of Llanelian, north Wales, where her uncle also ran a farm. Her mother is a fluent Welsh speaker. In 2023, Hynes took part in the S4C series Iaith ar Daith, where she began to learn the Welsh language; she cited being able to speak Welsh to her mother as a reason she wanted to take part in the programme.

== Career ==
As a teenager, Hynes was a member of the National Youth Theatre company, and made her stage début with the company in Lionel Bart's Blitz! in 1990. In 1991 she appeared in Disney's Swing Kids (1993 film) alongside Frank Whaley and Robert Sean-Leonard. In the same year she appeared in Peter Greenaway's film The Baby of Macon playing The First Midwife. Between 1992 and 1993, she played a season at the West Yorkshire Playhouse, Leeds. In 1994, Hynes appeared as an uncredited extra in the first episode of The Day Today in the Attitudes Night segment, a parody of the UK's changing attitudes.

Early in her career, Hynes teamed up with future Spaced co-star Katy Carmichael in a comedy double-act called the Liz Hurleys, appeared in two productions at Sheffield's Crucible Theatre, and acted for television shows including Staying Alive, Six Pairs of Pants, (Un)natural Acts, and Asylum (on which the Spaced team of Hynes, Simon Pegg and Edgar Wright first assembled). From 1998 to 2000, she played the supporting role of Cheryl in the hit sitcom The Royle Family; she reprised the role for special episodes in 2006, 2009 and 2010. In 1999, she co-wrote and starred in Spaced.

Hynes' London theatre debut was in April 2002, playing the tough ex-prisoner "Bolla" in Jez Butterworth's The Night Heron at the Royal Court, for which she was nominated for a Laurence Olivier Award. In 2004, she played a minor part as Yvonne in horror comedy Shaun of the Dead, again working with Pegg and Wright. In the same year, she was also cast as Magda, friend of the titular character, in the Hollywood sequel Bridget Jones: The Edge of Reason.

In early 2007, Hynes took a lead role in the film Magicians, starring alongside comic duo David Mitchell and Robert Webb. She provided the voice of Mafalda Hopkirk in Harry Potter and the Order of the Phoenix.

She played Joan Redfern in the 2007 Doctor Who episodes "Human Nature" and "The Family of Blood". She then appeared in part two of the story "The End of Time", playing a character named Verity Newman, who is Joan's great-granddaughter. Hynes appeared in Big Finish's Eighth Doctor audio adventure "Invaders from Mars", with her Spaced colleague Simon Pegg. She starred in Son of Rambow (credited as Jessica Stevenson), playing Mary Proudfoot opposite the star of the film, Bill Milner. In November 2007, BBC One released Learners, a comedy drama television movie which Hynes starred in and wrote.

In 2008, she appeared in a revival of Alan Ayckbourn's The Norman Conquests at the Old Vic. In 2009 she made her Broadway debut in the play's transfer and was nominated for a Tony Award for her performance. The show itself won a Tony Award for best revival that year.

Hynes appeared as a "right-on" PR person, Siobhan Sharpe, in the London Olympics centred satire Twenty Twelve, of which the first series screened on BBC Four in 2011, moving to BBC Two in spring 2012. A further series was screened in July 2012. She reprised the role in the 2014 series W1A for which she won a BAFTA.

In 2017, she directed her first feature film, The Fight, produced by Jamie Adams and Unstoppable media. In 2018, she played the role of a mother in the BBC Four programme There She Goes. She stars alongside David Tennant, raising a daughter with a severe learning disability. It is based on the real life of writer Shaun Pye and his wife Sarah Crawford, whose daughter was born with a chromosomal disorder. She won a BAFTA for her role in the series and was nominated for an International Emmy for her role in '414' the special made in 2023. In 2019, she starred in the BBC and HBO production Years and Years for which she won a Royal Television Society award.

== Personal life ==
Hynes married Adam Hynes, a sculptor, in 2002 after being in a relationship since they were 18 years old. She officially changed her surname from her birth name of Stevenson, including for screen credits. They have three children together, and as of 2016 were living in Folkestone, Kent.

== Filmography ==
=== Film ===
Year	Title	Role	Notes
1993	Swing Kids	Helga	Credited as Jessica Stevenson
1993	The Baby of Mâcon	The First Midwife	Credited as Jessica Stevenson
2000	Born Romantic	Libby	Credited as Jessica Stevenson
2002	Tomorrow La Scala!	Victoria	Credited as Jessica Stevenson
2002	Pure	Paramedic	Credited as Jessica Stevenson
2004	Shaun of the Dead	Yvonne	Credited as Jessica Stevenson
2004	Bridget Jones: The Edge of Reason	Magda	Credited as Jessica Stevenson
2006	Confetti	Sam	Credited as Jessica Stevenson
2007	Four Last Songs	Miranda	Credited as Jessica Stevenson
2007	Son of Rambow	Mary Proudfoot	Credited as Jessica Stevenson
2007	Magicians	Linda Jones	Credited as Jessica Stevenson
2007	Harry Potter and the Order of the Phoenix	Mafalda Hopkirk (voice)	Credited as Jessica Stevenson
2008	Faintheart	Cath	
2010	Burke and Hare	Lucky	
2011	Chalet Girl	Interviewer 2	
2012	Nativity 2: Danger in the Manger	Angel Matthews	
2014	Pudsey the Dog: The Movie	Gail	
2015	Winter	Claudia	
2016	Swallows and Amazons	Mrs. Jackson	
2016	Bridget Jones's Baby	Magda	
2017	Paddington 2	Miss Kitts	
2018	Songbird	Sara	aka: Alright Now
2018	The Fight	Tina Bell	Also writer & director
2018	Nativity Rocks!	Angel Matthews	
2019	Seagull	Janet	
2024	Seize Them!	Leofwine	
2024	Paddington in Peru	Miss Kitts	Cameo
2025	Death of a Unicorn	Shaw	

=== Television ===
Year	Title	Role	Notes
1994	The House of Eliott	Charlotte Parker	Episode: #3.1
1995	Tears Before Bedtime	Maggie	4 episodes
1995	Crown Prosecutor	Jackie South	10 episodes
1995	Six Pairs of Pants	Various characters	3 episodes
1996	Mash and Peas	Various roles	Unknown episodes
1996	Asylum	Nurse McFadden / Martha	Mini-series; 6 episodes. Also writer
1996–1997	Staying Alive	Alice Timpson	Series 1 & 2; 12 episodes
1997	Midsomer Murders	Judith Lessiter	Episode: "The Killings at Badger's Drift"
1997	Armstrong and Miller	Various roles	Series 1 & 2, 12 episodes
1997–1998	Harry Enfield and Chums	Various roles	Episodes: "Christmas Chums", "Yule Log Chums"
1998	Alexei Sayle's Merry-Go-Round	Various roles	Episode: #1.1
1998	Unnatural Acts	Various roles	Main cast. 4 episodes
1998–2010	The Royle Family	Cheryl Carroll	Recurring role. Series 1–4; 13 episodes
1999	People Like Us	Sarah	Episode: "The Estate Agent"
1999	The Nearly Complete and Utter History of Everything	Woman with Black Death Victim	Television film
1999–2001	Spaced	Daisy Steiner / Amber (voice)	Series 1 & 2; 14 episodes. Also co-wrote with Simon Pegg
2001	Randall & Hopkirk (Deceased)	Felia Siderova	3 episodes
2001	Bob & Rose	Holly Vance	Mini-series; 6 episodes
2001	Comedy Lab	Wife (voice)	Episode: "Knife & Wife"
2002	Dick Whittington	The Good Fairy	Television film
2002	Black Books	Eva	Episode: "Hello Sun"
2004	Bosom Pals	Marie (voice)	Television film
2005	According to Bex	Rebecca 'Bex' Atwell	Main role. 8 episodes
2006	Agatha Christie's Marple	Aimee Griffith	Episode: "The Moving Finger"
2006	Pinochet in Suburbia	WPC Broughton	Television film
2006	The Secret Policeman's Ball	Mrs. Peacock	Recording of staged show
2007	Doctor Who	Nurse Joan Redfern	Episodes: "Human Nature", "The Family of Blood"
2007	Learners	Beverley	Television film. Also writer
2010	Doctor Who	Verity Newman	Episode: "The End of Time, Part Two"
2010	Lizzie and Sarah	Sarah / Ellie	Television pilot. Also writer & assoc. producer
2010	Little Crackers	Dawn	Episode: "Julian Barratt's Little Cracker: Satan's Hoof"
2011	Skins	Crystal	Episode: "Everyone"
2011	The Hour	Jane Kish	Episode: "Crises at Home and Abroad"
2011–2012	Twenty Twelve	Siobhan Sharpe	Main cast. Series 1 & 2; 14 episodes
2012	One Night	Carol	Mini-series; 4 episodes
2012	Moone Boy	Jennifer Bakewell	Episode: "Another Prick in the Wall"
2012	World's Most Dangerous Roads	Herself	Episode 2
2013	Common Ground	Patricia David	Episode: "Patricia". Also writer
2013	Blandings	Lady Daphne Littlewood	Episode: "Problems with Drink"
2013	Crackanory	Storyteller	Read "My Former Self" by Holly Walsh
2013–2015	Up the Women	Margaret	Series 1 & 2; 9 episodes. Also creator, writer, assoc. producer
2014–2017, 2024	W1A	Siobhan Sharpe	Series 1–3; 14 episodes & Comic Relief Special (2024)
2015	Cider with Rosie	Crabby	Television film
2016	The Keith Lemon Sketch Show	Owner/Manager	Series 2; "The Cartoon Job Centre" sketches
2016	Hoff the Record	Deborah Sangster	Episode: "Divorce"
2016	Hooten & the Lady	Ella Bond	Mini-series; 8 episodes
2016–2018	Jack and Dean of All Trades	Marv	Series 1 & 2; 13 episodes
2017	The Keith & Paddy Picture Show	Marjorie	Episode: "Dirty Dancing"
2017, 2018	The Crystal Maze	Knight Marion	3 Celebrity Specials & 1 standard episode: "Jazzy Jury"
2018	Hang Ups	Katherine Pitt	4 episodes
2018, 2020, 2023	There She Goes	Emily Yates	Main cast. Series 1 & 2; 10 episodes & 1 Special
2019	Years and Years	Edith Lyons	Mini-series; 6 episodes
2020	Roald & Beatrix: The Tail of the Curious Mouse	Sofie Dahl	Television film
2022	Mood	Laura	Mini-series; 4 episodes
2022	The Witchfinder	Old Myers	6 episodes
2022	Life After Life	Mrs. Glover	4 episodes
2022	Inside No. 9	Helen	Episode: "A Random Act of Kindness"
2022, 2025	Am I Being Unreasonable?	Becca	Recurring role. Series 1 & 2; 2 episodes
2023	Dreaming Whilst Black	Drew	Episodes: "The Friends", "The Premiere"
2023	The Great Stand Up to Cancer Bake Off	Herself - Contestant	1 episode; Star Baker
2024	The Completely Made-Up Adventures of Dick Turpin	The Reddlehag	Episode: "Curse of the Reddlehag"
2024	The Franchise	Steph	Main cast. 8 episodes
2025	Miss Austen	Mary Austen	Main Cast. Mini-series; 4 episodes
2026	Patience	DI Frankie Monroe	Main Cast. Series 2; 8 episodes

== Awards ==
Year	Award	Work	Result
1999	British Comedy Award for Best Female Comedy Newcomer	Spaced and The Royle Family	Won
2001	British Comedy Award for Best TV Comedy Actress	Spaced	Won
2002	British Academy Television Award for Best Situation Comedy	Spaced	Nominated
2002	RTS Television Award for Best Actor – Female	Tomorrow La Scala!	Nominated
2003	British Academy Television Award for Best Actress	Tomorrow La Scala!	Nominated
2003	Laurence Olivier Award for Best Performance in a Supporting Role	The Night Heron	Nominated
2009	Tony Award for Best Featured Actress in a Play	The Norman Conquests	Nominated
2012	British Comedy Award for Best TV Comedy Actress	Twenty Twelve	Nominated
2013	RTS Television Award for Best Comedy Performance	Twenty Twelve	Won
2013	British Academy Television Award for Best Female Comedy Performance	Twenty Twelve	Nominated
2015	British Academy Television Award for Best Female Comedy Performance	W1A	Won
2019	British Academy Television Award for Best Female Comedy Performance	There She Goes	Won
