= Marcus Berkmann =

English journalist (born 1960)

- Born: 14 July 1960 (age 66)
- Education: Worcester College, Oxford
- Occupations: Author; journalist

Marcus Berkmann (born 14 July 1960) is a journalist and author.

== Life ==
Berkmann was educated at Highgate School and Worcester College, Oxford. His younger brother is the DJ Justin Berkmann. He began his career as a freelance journalist, contributing to computer and gaming magazines such as Your Sinclair. In the 1990s he had stints as television critic for the Daily Mail and the Sunday Express and has written a monthly pop music column for The Spectator since 1987.

With his schoolfriend Harry Thompson, he scripted the BBC Radio comedy Lenin of the Rovers. He came to prominence with his book, Rain Men (1995), which humorously chronicles the formation and adventures of his own cricket touring team, the Captain Scott Invitation XI. Berkmann has continued to write newspaper and cricket magazine columns, such as the Last Man In column on the back page of Wisden Cricket Monthly, while producing a number of critically well-received humorous books. In Brain Men (1999), he applied his sardonic observations to the world of pub quizzes, and takes the same approach to Fatherhood (2005). Later in 2005, he released the book Zimmer Men, as a sort of sequel to Rain Men, describing his next team, and his transition into middle age with cricket.

He is also credited as one of the writing team of the BBC Three comedy show Monkey Dust, and compiles the "Dumb Britain" column in Private Eye magazine. In 2009, he set up the quiz company Brain Men with Stephen Arkell and Chris Pollikett. His book A Shed of One's Own: Midlife Without the Crisis was serialised by BBC Radio 4 in its Book of the Week slot during 2012. In the same year, he replaced Fred Housego as Marcel Berlins' partner on Round Britain Quiz on BBC Radio 4.

A fan of Star Trek since its first British screening by the BBC in 1969, his book on the franchise, Set Phasers to Stun: 50 Years of Star Trek, aimed at the general reader, was published in March 2016.

== Bibliography ==
- The complete guide to Test cricket in the Eighties. Partridge Press. 1990.
- Other People: Portraits From The 90s with D. J. Taylor (Bloomsbury, 1990)
- Rain Men: The Madness of Cricket (Little, Brown, 1995)
- Brain Men: A Passion to Compete (Little, Brown, 1999)
- Fatherhood: The Truth (Vermilion, 2005)
- Zimmer Men: The Trials and Tribulations of the Ageing Cricketer (Little, Brown, 2005)
- The Prince of Wales (Highgate) Quiz Book (Hodder & Stoughton, 2006)
- "iPod dilemma" The Spectator 308/9397 (4 October 2008) : 53
- Ashes to Ashes (Little, Brown, 2009)
- A Shed of One's Own: Midlife Without the Crisis (Little, Brown, 2012)
- Set Phasers to Stun: 50 Years of Star Trek (Little, Brown, 2016)
- Berkmann's Cricketing Miscellany (Little, Brown, 2019)
- Berkmann's Pop Miscellany: Sex, Drugs and Cars in Swimming Pools (Little, Brown, 2021)
- How to Be a Writer: Baths, Biscuits and Endless Cups of Tea (Little, Brown, 2022)
- Still a Bit of Snap in the Celery, or K.B.O. (Abacus, 2023)
