= Respectable (TV series) =

British sitcom 2006

- Genre: Sitcom
- Written by: Shaun Pye; Harry Thompson; Alan Connor
- Directed by: Dominic Brigstocke
- Starring: Justin Edwards; Jodi Albert; Beatrice Kelly; Cordelia Bugeja; Barunka O'Shaughnessy; Nick Holder; Helen Grace; Helen Modern
- Country of origin: United Kingdom
- Original language: English
- No. of series: 1
- No. of episodes: 6

Production
- Executive producers: Graham Smith; Daisy Goodwin
- Producer: Shaun Pye (1 episode)
- Camera setup: Single-camera setup
- Production company: Silver River Productions

Original release
- Network: Five
- Release: 30 August – 4 October 2006

Respectable is a British sitcom, first shown in six episodes from 30 August to 4 October 2006 on Five; it was later repeated on Paramount Comedy 1 and Paramount Comedy 2.

It follows Michael Price, a man acutely aware of his own dullness, trapped in a loveless marriage. In the first episode, he hesitantly visits a suburban brothel. Terrified of sex, he strikes up a platonic relationship with a young prostitute, Hayley. The series follows the development of this relationship, and Michael's attempts to conceal his visits to the brothel from his wife. This is complicated by the discovery that his builder, Barry, is a frequent and uninhibited visitor to the brothel.

The show was written by Shaun Pye, Alan Connor and Harry Thompson. Former Hollyoaks actress Jodi Albert plays Hayley, a dumb hooker with a heart of gold; Kate is a university student, owner Maureen is a more mature lady who claims to be 27, while Yelena is a dominant Eastern European. Of the characters who don't work there, Michael is going through a mid-life crisis, while his friendly builder Barry is a typical "Jack the lad".

== Characters ==
Character	Actor
Michael	Justin Edwards
Hayley	Jodi Albert
Maureen	Beatrice Kelly
Kate	Cordelia Bugeja
Yelena	Barunka O'Shaughnessy
Barry	Nick Holder
Pippa	Helen Grace
Naomi	Helen Modern

== International broadcasters ==
- Bold - Canada
- Comedy Central - Netherlands
- UKTV Foxtel - Australia

== DVD release ==
Respectable was released on region 2 in the UK on DVD on 9 October 2006 via 2entertain distribution.
