= 2003 British Academy Television Awards =

UK television awards ceremony

- Date: 13 April 2003
- Site: The Dorchester
- Hosted by: Anne Robinson

Highlights
- Best Comedy Series: Alistair McGowan's Big Impression
- Best Drama: Spooks
- Best Actor: Albert Finney; The Gathering Storm
- Best Actress: Julie Walters; Murder
- Best Comedy Performance: Ricky Gervais The Office

Television coverage
- Channel: BBC One
- Ratings: 6.72 million

The 2003 British Academy Television Awards were held on Sunday 13 April at The Dorchester in London. The ceremony was hosted by television presenter Anne Robinson.

== Winners ==
- Best Actor
  - Winner: Albert Finney — The Gathering Storm (BBC Two)
  - Other nominees: Kenneth Branagh — Conspiracy (BBC Two); Kenneth Branagh — Shackleton (Channel 4); James Nesbitt — Bloody Sunday (ITV)
- Best Actress
  - Winner: Julie Walters — Murder (BBC Two)
  - Other nominees: Sheila Hancock — Bedtime (BBC One); Vanessa Redgrave — The Gathering Storm (BBC Two); Jessica Stevenson — Tomorrow La Scala! (BBC Two)
- Best Comedy (Programme or Series)
  - Winner: Alistair McGowan's Big Impression (Vera / BBC One)
  - Other nominees: Bremner, Bird and Fortune (Vera / Channel 4); Look Around You (TalkBack Productions / BBC Two); Smack the Pony (Talkback Productions / Channel 4)
- Best Comedy Performance
  - Winner: Ricky Gervais — The Office (BBC Two)
  - Other nominees: John Bird & John Fortune — Bremner, Bird and Fortune (Channel 4); Steve Coogan — I'm Alan Partridge (BBC Two); Peter Kay — Phoenix Nights (Channel 4)
- Best Drama Serial
  - Winner: Shackleton (Firstsight Films / Channel 4)
  - Other nominees: Auf Wiedersehen, Pet (BBC / Ziji Productions / BBC One); Doctor Zhivago (Granada Television / ITV); Murder (Tiger Aspect Productions / BBC Two)
- Best Drama Series
  - Winner: Spooks (Kudos Film & Television / BBC One)
  - Other nominees: Clocking Off (Red Production Company / BBC One); Cutting It (BBC / BBC One); Teachers (Tiger Aspect Productions / Channel 4)
- Best Single Drama
  - Winner: Conspiracy (HBO / BBC Films / BBC Two)
  - Other nominees: Bloody Sunday (Granada Film / Hell's Kitchen / ITV); Flesh and Blood (Red Production Company / BBC Two); Tomorrow La Scala! (BBC Films / UK Film Council / BBC Two)
- Best Soap Opera
  - Winner: Coronation Street (Granada Television / ITV)
  - Other nominees: Doctors (BBC / BBC One); EastEnders (BBC / BBC One); Hollyoaks (Mersey Television / Channel 4)
- Best Current Affairs
  - Winner: Young, Nazi and Proud (Steve Boulton Productions / Channel 4)
  - Other nominees: Panorama — Corruption of Racing (BBC / BBC One); Panorama – Licence to Murder (BBC / BBC One); Palestine is Still the Issue – A Special Report by John Pilger (Carlton Television / ITV)
- Best Entertainment Performance
  - Winner: Paul Merton — Have I Got News For You (BBC One)
  - Other nominees: Sanjeev Bhaskar — The Kumars at No. 42 (BBC Two); Angus Deayton — Have I Got News For You (BBC One); Meera Syal — The Kumars at No. 42 (BBC Two)
- Best Factual Series or Strand
  - Winner: The Trust (Hart Ryan Productions / Channel 4)
  - Other nominees: A History of Britain by Simon Schama (BBC / BBC Two); The Life of Mammals (BBC Natural History / BBC One); Revealed (Various / Five)
- Best Feature
  - Winner: Faking It (RDF Media / Channel 4)
  - Other nominees: Jamie's Kitchen (Talkback Productions / Fresh One / Channel 4); Lads Army (20/20 Television / ITV); What Not to Wear (BBC / BBC Two)
- Flaherty Award for Single Documentary
  - Winner: Feltham Sings (Century Films / Channel 4)
  - Other nominees: 9/11: The Tale of Two Towers (Michael Attwell Productions / Five); SAS Embassy Siege (BBC / BBC Two); Thalidomide - Life at 40 (BBC Scotland / BBC Two)
- Entertainment Programme or Series
  - Winner: I'm a Celebrity, Get Me Out of Here! (London Weekend Television / ITV)
  - Other nominees: Friday Night with Jonathan Ross (Open Mike with Mike Bullard / BBC One); The Kumars at No. 42 (Hat Trick Productions / BBC Two); Test the Nation (Talent Television / BBC One)
- News Coverage
  - Winner: Soham - August 16/17 (Sky News / Sky News)
  - Other nominees: Collapse of the Paul Burrell Trial (BBC / BBC One / BBC News 24); The Death of the Queen Mother (ITN / ITV); Jenin and Bethlehem - What Chance of Peace? (ITN / Channel 4)
- Situation Comedy Award
  - Winner: The Office (BBC / BBC Two)
  - Other nominees: The Book Group (Pirate Productions / Channel 4); My Family (DLT Entertainment / Rude Boy Productions / BBC One); Phoenix Nights (Ovation Entertainment / Channel 4)
- Sport
  - Winner: The Commonwealth Games (BBC / BBC One)
  - Other nominees: 2002 FIFA World Cup (ISN / Carlton Television / ITV); World Rally Championship (Chrysalis Television / Channel 4); World Cup: England v Argentina (BBC / BBC One)
- The Alan Clarke Award
  - Norma Percy
  - Brian Lapping
- Special Award
  - Carl Davis
