= There She Goes (TV series) =

British comedy-drama television series

- Genre: Comedy drama
- Created by: Shaun Pye
- Written by: Shaun Pye
- Directed by: Simon Hynd
- Starring: David Tennant; Jessica Hynes
- Country of origin: United Kingdom
- Original language: English
- No. of series: 2 (1 special)
- No. of episodes: 11

Production
- Executive producers: Clelia Mountford; Sharon Horgan; Alex Moody (series 1)
- Producer: Clelia Mountford
- Cinematography: Vanessa Whyte (series 1); James Rhodes (series 2)
- Camera setup: Single-camera
- Running time: 28–30 minutes
- Production company: Merman Television

Original release
- Network: BBC Four (series 1); BBC Two (series 2)
- Release: 16 October 2018 – 21 June 2023

There She Goes is a British comedy-drama television series created and written by Shaun Pye, and based on his own experiences with his daughter who was born with a chromosomal disorder. The show follows the life of learning-disabled Rosie Yates, along with her parents Emily and Simon, and her older brother Ben. Both series are set in Rosie's present, but the writing features frequent flashbacks to her infancy and pre-school life (around ten years previously), when her parents were gradually learning of Rosie's disability.

It was originally produced by Merman Television for BBC Four, but later moved to BBC Two for the second series. The programme received mostly positive reviews.

In January 2023, filming began for a one-off hour-long special. It was broadcast on 21 June 2023.

== Cast and characters ==
- Miley Locke as Rosie Ann Yates, a non-verbal child with an intellectual disability caused by DYRK1A syndrome, a rare chromosomal condition
- David Tennant as Simon Yates, Rosie's father. Simon uses humour and sarcasm to deflect from his anxieties about parenthood, and (in flashbacks) from his alcoholism when Rosie was a toddler.
- Jessica Hynes as Emily Yates, Rosie's mother. She is more practical and accepting of her daughter's disability than Simon is. She gives birth to Rosie in 2006.
- Edan Hayhurst as Ben Yates, Rosie's well-behaved older brother who sometimes hates Rosie for her tantrums and aggressiveness.
- Yasmine Akram as Helen, a friend of Simon's, in whom he confides during their trips to the pub
- Ben Willbond as Chris, the Yates's next door neighbour
- Maya Kelly as Ellie, Chris's daughter
- Nigel Planer as Grandad "Gandalf" Pat, Emily's father
- Philip Jackson as Grandad John, Simon's stepdad
- Serena Evans as Grandma Cath, Emily's mother
- Jo Cameron Brown as Nana Anne, Simon's mother
- Justin Edwards as Barney, Simon's friend
- Amber Aga as Katrina, Emily's co-worker
- Joseph Harmon as Jamie, Ben's friend from school
- Michael Gould as Dr Pritchard
- Gregor Fisher as William "Bill" Yates, Simon's father, who left the family when Simon was a boy

== Episodes ==
Series	Episodes	Originally released	
Series	Episodes	First released	Last released
1	5	16 October 2018	13 November 2018
2	5	9 July 2020	6 August 2020
3	1	21 June 2023	21 June 2023

=== Series 1 (2018) ===
No. overall	No. in series	Title	Directed by	Written by	Original release date	UK viewers (millions)
1	1	"One Day in the Life of Rosie Yates"	Simon Hynd	Shaun Pye	16 October 2018	0.98
In 2015, Simon tries to take his children Rosie and Ben to the park, but Rosie resists at every step. After Emily drives them there, they drag Rosie out of the car and she lies on the ground moaning. They immediately return home, and Emily tries to use an augmentative and alternative communication (AAC) tablet to talk to Rosie. She and Simon try to get Rosie to eat by singing and making "x" sounds. Later, as they search for faeces which Rosie has hidden, she goes to the kitchen and pours milk over herself. After Emily cleans her, Simon lures her to bed with crisps and an iPad. When the iPad runs out, she bangs the door until it creates a hole in the wall. Simon gets increasingly frustrated and stressed until Emily brings her downstairs. In 2006, Simon regularly goes to the pub and gets drunk, telling Emily that he is at work events. When Rosie is two months old, Emily argues with her mother, saying that something is wrong with Rosie. Meanwhile, Simon talks derisively about Rosie to his friend Helen. When he returns home at 1:30 a.m., Emily vents to him that Rosie isn't normal and nobody believes her.
2	2	"Bubble Chess"	Simon Hynd	Shaun Pye	23 October 2018	0.66
3	3	"What Rosie Wants"	Simon Hynd	Shaun Pye	30 October 2018	0.69
4	4	"The Wrong Grandad"	Simon Hynd	Shaun Pye	6 November 2018	0.52
5	5	"Ben"	Simon Hynd	Shaun Pye	13 November 2018	0.52

=== Series 2 (2020) ===
No. overall	No. in series	Title	Directed by	Written by	Original release date	UK viewers (millions)
6	1	"Speech and Language"	Simon Hynd	Shaun Pye and Sarah Crawford	9 July 2020	N/A
Now 11-years-old, Rosie starts to say the word "Mama", raising hopes that her verbal communication will finally take off. Feeling totally outshone by Rosie's amazing school speech and language therapist Abigail, Emily concentrates on trying to develop Rosie's sign language. Meanwhile, Simon starts to worry that the other parents of children with special needs at the school look down on him. Both situations come to a head at the fundraiser at Rosie's special educational needs school. Back in 2007, one-year-old Rosie has her first full evaluation and Simon and Emily are told that she has an IQ of 47. In the doctor's view, it is unlikely this will change as she gets older. Simon and Emily find it hard to talk to each other, the relationship drifting apart as Simon retreats into his backyard to smoke and drink alone, and Emily taking solace in the company of Ben.
7	2	"President's Day"	Simon Hynd	Shaun Pye and Sarah Crawford	16 July 2020	N/A
Rosie is obsessed with it being Christmas despite it actually only being mid-February, constantly pointing at 25 December on the calendar, dragging Simon to buy a Christmas tree and obsessively watching Home Alone. When she discovers another day marked on the calendar – President's Day at the end of February – Emily and Simon wonder if celebrating President's Day will distract her from talking endlessly about all things Christmas. In 2007, Emily and Simon are no longer talking at all, except to argue and shout in front of Ben. They openly discuss with their friends whether they should split up until the situation finally comes to a head and months of pent of frustration is released in an emotional showdown.
8	3	"Head Space"	Simon Hynd	Shaun Pye and Sarah Crawford	23 July 2020	N/A
Emily is trying to get excited about her favorite night of the year – Simon's annual pub quiz, as Rosie distracts her by constantly making her draw a copy of a new picture they've hung up, Yves Tanguy's The Invisibles. As the quiz draws closer, Gandalf has a fall and can't babysit, leaving Emily with no choice but to take Rosie along. A combination of being physically forced to repeatedly draw The Invisibles and unwanted attention from an interfering do-gooder threatens to drive Emily totally insane. In the early timeline, set in 2008, Emily and Simon start to function as a family again. Emily goes back to work, putting Rosie into a nursery. But this new found normality is shattered when Rosie has a very frightening seizure in the middle of the night and is rushed to hospital, leaving Emily to despair about what new medical nightmares await them all.
9	4	"We Need to Talk About Rosie"	Simon Hynd	Shaun Pye and Sarah Crawford	30 July 2020	N/A
Picking up Rosie from school, Simon is told that the staff have noticed some bruising on her sides and legs, which can only have happened over the weekend. Simon becomes increasingly paranoid, especially when a horribly formal letter tells them social services will be making an imminent visit. Convinced that an investigation will spread to all aspects of their parenting, Simon and Emily nervously await the arrival of social worker Caroline. In 2008, Simon and Emily are thrilled when Rosie takes her first steps, fulfilling a milestone they didn't think she would ever reach. The initial joy gives way to concern as a mobile Rosie proves to be very accident prone, especially when the nursery find it increasingly hard to cope and tell Emily she will have to find alternative arrangements.
10	5	"Marmalade Chunks"	Simon Hynd	Shaun Pye and Sarah Crawford	6 August 2020	N/A
Rosie is excited as they set off for the annual summer holiday but things are not as she was expecting. In 2009, Simon and Emily are confronted with Fliss, their perfect new niece. Ben meanwhile opens up to Emily about how he is struggling to cope with Rosie being around and all the attention she is getting.

=== 2023 special (2023) ===
No. overall	No. in series	Title	Directed by	Written by	Original release date	UK viewers (millions)
1	1	"414"	Tom McKay	Shaun Pye and Sarah Crawford	21 June 2023	N/A

== Production ==
Written by the married couple Shaun Pye and Sarah Crawford, the programme is based on real-life events with their learning disabled daughter Joey ("Jo"), who was born in 2006. Pye would regularly make Facebook posts about funny incidents involving Jo, to positive feedback from friends, leading him to consider that the topic could be suitable for a sitcom. However, he noted that it is not "a generalised story about disability", only one about his experiences. Whilst not wanting to "sugarcoat" his experiences, he did want to demonstrate how "wonderful" his life with his daughter is.

Pye's first draft focused on a more sympathetically-portrayed Simon, but this was rewritten after he showed his wife Sarah the script. Sarah had a considerable role in the writing of the show, with her and Pye having lengthy conversations about the darker period of their life, which the 2006 timeline is based on. Pye commented that Simon's dialogue is based on his own manner of speech, rather than what may be considered politically correct. The programme's title comes from the song "There She Goes" by The La's, which Pye listened to while writing the first script.

Jessica Hynes and David Tennant were cast as parents Emily and Simon Yates, having worked together on the science fiction programme Doctor Who in the past. They found that their familiarity with each other aided their acting as a couple. Hynes was interested in the script because of its "naturalistic" presentation of family life and the "familiar and recognisable" mother character. As a parent, Hynes found much of the material relatable and could "completely identify with" Sarah. She aimed to create something "unerringly truthful" and described the series as "gentle, poignant, truthful and funny".

Tennant knew Pye prior to the series, having also worked with him when appearing on the panel show Have I Got News For You and talk show The Jonathan Ross Show. Tennant said that he was attracted to the role as the writing was "so honest and so candid". He said that his acting style was "ruthlessly honest", commenting that "at no point are we trying to construct comic moments" as the power of the story is that "it is just what happened". At the time of filming the first series, Tennant had three children and said that the series affected his perspective on parenthood.

Miley Locke, who does not have learning disabilities, was cast as Rosie. Though disabled actors were auditioned for the role, advice from psychologists was that the long working hours with minimal breaks would be too burdensome for a learning disabled child. Characters such as the Yates' neighbour are based on real people from Pye's life, as are some scenes such as Simon taking Rosie to a Baby Sing class and Emily hearing Rosie laugh for the first time. During filming, Pye had to leave the set for a couple of scenes due to the emotive acting by Hynes and Tennant.

Filming for a one-hour special after the second series began on 16 January 2023. It is set to focus on Rosie's changing behaviour as she undergoes puberty. Crawford said that it was based on their family's experiences in early 2020, when they underwent "the most poignantly funny moments, painfully difficult lows and exhilaratingly uplifting highs of life with Joey".

== Analysis ==
Pye has a background in comedy writing, but he describes the show as comedy-drama. It also contains some traits of biopics and tragicomedies. Its humour is dark, bleak and contains bathos; it is presented in the form of one-liners. Rachel Aroesti of The Guardian commented that the show is rare in that it shows the negative effects of motherhood, and compared it to the 2018 thriller series The Cry.

== Reception ==
=== Critical response ===
Critical response of There She Goes
Season	Rotten Tomatoes
1	82% (11 reviews)
2	100% (6 reviews)

On the review aggregator website Rotten Tomatoes, for the first season, 82% of 11 critics' reviews are positive, with an average rating of 8 out of 10. The website's consensus reads, "There She Goes is a gently mirthful and moving exploration of a family unit doing their best to cope with disability, offering a mature view on the issue along with lovely performances." For the second season, 100% of six critics' reviews are positive, with an average rating of 8.2 out of 10.

Victoria Segal of The Sunday Times chose There She Goes as the "TV pick of the week". Segal commented that the "gallows humour might be a bit tough for some viewers to stomach", but praises that the parents are presented as loving whilst still sometimes acting poorly. The Times' Chris Bennion rated the programme four out of five stars, calling it "bracingly honest" and "a marvel from start to finish". Sean O'Grady of The Independent also gave the show four out of five stars, praising the "searing emotional honesty" and the "sensitive and engaging" acting of Hynes and Tennant. O'Grady gives the first series finale a rating of four out of five stars, lauding the "formidable quantity of quality talent".

Louisa Mellor of Den of Geek praised There She Goes as "unsentimental, honest [and] well-written", lauding the usage of two timelines, so the "lighter and warmer" 2015 timeline can balance the 2006 timeline which is "full of pain". Mellor praised Pye for being "bravely unflattering" in his portrayal of Simon, and for his "boldly unsentimental writing and diamond-clear truths". For The Guardian, Rachel Aroesti gave the show a positive review, describing it as an "uplifting experience". She praised the programme as "mordantly, outrageously funny" and lauded Hynes' acting. Joel Keller of Decider praised Pye for demonstrating that Simon "can be a total prat" at times, calling the programme a "very realistic and balanced look" at parenthood which any parent can relate to. Keller praised Locke, saying he was surprised to find out that she was not disabled, but found Tennant's Scottish accent tough to understand. Euan Ferguson of The Observer described Pye's writing as "gutsily and refreshingly honest" and praises its delivery by Hynes and Tennant.

In a negative review for New Statesman, Rachel Cooke described the show as "airless and over-loaded", criticising the number of flashbacks. Cooke praised it as "determinedly unsentimental" but described the humour as "a few carefully deployed bad-taste gags". Whilst Saskia Baron of The Arts Desk approved that the parents were not "impossibly warm and saintly", she found that some of their dialogue made for "uncomfortable viewing" and recommended "more consideration of the feelings of learning disabled people and perhaps their greater involvement". However, Baron praised the programme's "ring of complete authenticity" and hoped that it would "[make] viewers think before rushing to judgement next time they see someone with unusual behaviour".

=== Accolades ===
Award nominations for There She Goes
Year	Award	Category	Nominee(s)	Result	Ref.
2019	BAFTA Television Awards	Best Female Comedy Performance	Jessica Hynes	Won	
2019	Royal Television Society Scotland Awards	Television Director of the Year	Simon Hynd	Won	
2024	BAFTA Scotland	Actor television	David Tennant	Won	

== Release ==
A short trailer for the programme was released on the BBC website on 5 October 2018. The first series premiered on BBC Four in the UK, from 16 October to 13 November 2018. It is available in the United States and Canada on the streaming service Britbox.
