= Is This Thing On? =

2025 film by Bradley Cooper

- Theatrical release poster
- Directed by: Bradley Cooper
- Screenplay by: Bradley Cooper; Will Arnett; Mark Chappell
- Story by: Will Arnett; Mark Chappell; John Bishop
- Produced by: Bradley Cooper; Weston Middleton; Will Arnett; Kris Thykier
- Starring: Will Arnett; Laura Dern; Andra Day; Bradley Cooper
- Cinematography: Matthew Libatique
- Edited by: Charlie Greene
- Music by: James Newberry
- Production companies: Lea Pictures; Archery Pictures
- Distributed by: Searchlight Pictures
- Release dates: October 10, 2025 (NYFF); December 19, 2025 (United States)
- Running time: 121 minutes
- Country: United States
- Language: English
- Box office: $10.1 million

Is This Thing On? is a 2025 American comedy-drama film directed by Bradley Cooper, who co-wrote the screenplay with Will Arnett and Mark Chappell. It is loosely based on the life of English comedian John Bishop, who was given a story credit. It stars Arnett, Laura Dern, Cooper, Andra Day, Amy Sedaris, Sean Hayes, Christine Ebersole, and Ciarán Hinds.

Described as a comedy of remarriage, Is This Thing On? premiered as the closing film of the 2025 New York Film Festival on October 10 and was released in the United States by Searchlight Pictures on December 19. It received mostly positive reviews from critics, with the performances of Arnett and Dern and the direction of Cooper singled out for praise.

== Plot ==
After many years together, Alex and Tess have reached an amicable end to their marriage, thus beginning the awkward stage of figuring out how to live separately while raising two boys, Felix and Jude, and maintaining their friendships. After they split, Alex finds himself unable to pay the cover at the Olive Tree Cafe, and so puts his name down for the open mic night at the Comedy Cellar. Alex begins to regularly do stand-up and he has a fling with Jill, a fellow comic.

Tess was a professional volleyball player and as a high point participated in the Olympic Games. Now she considers returning to her passion by coaching. She reconnects with Laird, an old friend, who she learns is now divorced. They flirt and go from dinner to a bar to have drinks, which is coincidentally the venue where Alex is performing for the first time as a featured act. Tess hears his entire set, in which he speaks about their marriage. Outside, Alex and Tess confront each other about moving on quickly, but the two reconcile and have sex later that night. They continue seeing each other discreetly but agree that they should not tell their boys, friends, or family.

Christine and Balls are a befriended couple, which were introduced early on in the film. When Alex, Tess and their other friends Stephen and Geoffrey go on an annual trip to their friend's house at Oyster Bay, Balls tells Alex that their separation has inspired him to think about separating from Christine. Meanwhile, Christine says that she has been looking down on Alex because he reminds her of herself, and watching him wither away in marriage led her to reassess her marriage to Balls.

Christine reveals that Tess received an offer to be the assistant coach of the women's volleyball team for the upcoming 2028 Summer Olympics. Tess and Alex talk outside and he congratulates her, despite her uncertainty about the role. But Tess becomes upset when she learns that Alex hung a photo of her playing volleyball at his apartment, and she accuses him not seeing of who she is now. The argument resumes at night, when the two accuse each other of not having had each other's back during their marriage. This initiates Alex's next stand up routine, a bitter rant about relationships in general. Alex's father Jan attends, and advises his son that two people in a relationship need to rub off on each other.

Balls visits Alex the next morning and says that he has talked things out with Christine, saying that they are okay with being confused together. Alex then visits Tess, explaining that he was not unhappy with their relationship but rather during their relationship, and still wants to be with her. Together, Alex and Tess attend Felix and Jude's school performance of "Under Pressure", that they rehearsed throughout the film. At the end Alex and Tess start to dance happily and share a kiss.

== Cast ==
- Will Arnett as Alex Novak
- Laura Dern as Tess Novak
- Andra Day as Christine, Balls' wife
- Bradley Cooper as Balls, Alex's best friend
- Amy Sedaris as Kemp, emcee at the Comedy Cellar
- Sean Hayes as Stephen, Geoffrey's newlywed husband
- Christine Ebersole as Marilyn, Alex's mother
- Ciarán Hinds as Jan, Alex's father
- Scott Icenogle as Geoffrey, Stephen's newlywed husband; Icenogle is Hayes' husband in real life
- Chloe Radcliffe as Nina, a comic at the Cellar
- Jordan Jensen as Jill, a comic at the Cellar who Alex hooks up with
- Peyton Manning as Laird, who goes on a date with Tess after she splits up
- Reggie Conquest as Dan, a comic
- James Tom as Rolo, a comic
- Gabe Fazio as Gabe the Bouncer, who works at the Olive Tree Cafe
- Blake Kane as Felix, Alex and Tess' son, Jude's brother
- Calvin Knegten as Jude, Alex and Tess’ son, Felix's brother
- Ronald A. Nahass Jr. as Mr. Nahass

== Production ==
The idea for the film came from English comedian John Bishop, who met Will Arnett and told him about the night he decided to become a stand-up comedian. Arnett then co-wrote the screenplay with Mark Chappell, while Bishop received a story credit. In June 2023, Bradley Cooper was announced to be directing the film and starring in it with Arnett. Emily Blunt joined the cast later that month, but scheduling conflicts with Disclosure Day led to her dropping out. In December 2024, Sean Hayes joined the cast. In February 2025, Cooper confirmed Laura Dern and Andra Day as part of the cast, and announced that he would also make his debut as a camera operator on the film. Filming wrapped in April, with additional casting announced including Amy Sedaris, Peyton Manning, Christine Ebersole, and Ciarán Hinds.

Principal photography was scheduled to begin in Los Angeles in September 2024. Filming had reportedly started in New York City by January 2025. Production wrapped on April 16, 2025, with Searchlight planning a fall release.

== Release ==
Is This Thing On? had its world premiere as the closing film of the 2025 New York Film Festival on October 10, and it was released in the United States on December 19, 2025.

== Reception ==
=== Critical response ===
On the review aggregator website Rotten Tomatoes, 87% of 204 critics' reviews are positive, with an average rating of 7.3/10. The website's consensus reads: "Mining sly humor from its mature portrait of a failing marriage, Is This Thing On? is another terrific relationship study from Bradley Cooper and an ideal platform for Will Arnett's dramatic chops." Metacritic, which uses a weighted average, assigned the film a score of 72 out of 100, based on 46 critics, indicating "generally favorable" reviews.

Cooper's direction was praised. In The Hollywood Reporter, David Rooney wrote that Cooper's "unassuming" direction helped ground the film's emotional connection to the New York setting and imbued it with "a sweetness that’s never cloying, a generosity of spirit that’s never unearned". Close-up scenes in which Arnett is filmed performing his stand-up routines were emphasized by both Rooney and Tim Grierson from Screen International as moments where Cooper deftly amplified the film's intimacy in collaboration with Matthew Libatique's cinematography.

Arnett and Dern's performances were also well received. Reviewers including Alison Willmore and Adrian Horton found Arnett to be well cast, bringing a necessary self-deprecation and dry humor from past comic experience that augmented his credibility in the role and endeared audiences to connect with his character's journey. Siddhant Adlakha from Observer joined them in praising Dern for her chemistry with Arnett and her vulnerability, established within a mix of meditative introspections and spirited emotions, that served to heighten the "sometimes barbed and sometimes witty, always charged" mutual dynamic between the two characters.

=== Accolades ===
Award	Date of ceremony	Category	Recipient(s)	Result	Ref.
AARP Movies for Grownups Awards	January 10, 2026	Best Actress	Laura Dern	Won	
AARP Movies for Grownups Awards	January 10, 2026	Best Screenwriter	Bradley Cooper, Will Arnett, and Mark Chappell	Nominated	
San Diego Film Critics Society	December 15, 2025	Best Comedic Performance	Will Arnett	Nominated	
SCAD Savannah Film Festival	October 29, 2025	Luminary Award	Will Arnett	Honored	
Women Film Critics Circle	December 18, 2025	Best Screen Couple	Will Arnett and Laura Dern	Nominated	
