= Penguins Stopped Play =

2006 novel by Harry Thompson

Penguins Stopped Play: Eleven Village Cricketers Take on the World
- First edition
- Author: Harry Thompson
- Language: English
- Subject: Cricket, travel
- Genre: Sports literature
- Publisher: John Murray
- Publication date: 2006
- Publication place: United Kingdom
- Pages: 256 (first edition)
- ISBN: 978-0719563454
- Preceded by: This Thing of Darkness

Penguins Stopped Play: Eleven Village Cricketers Take on the World is a 2006 semi-autobiographical novel by the English writer and producer Harry Thompson. It describes the author's experiences forming and travelling with the Captain Scott XI, an English amateur cricket team, around Britain and abroad. It was published a year after the author's death.

In 2011 the book was adapted for a series of broadcasts on Book of the Week, a weekly programme on BBC Radio 4, read by the cricketer Nicholas Boulton.

== See also ==
- Village cricket
