= Shaun Pye =

English actor, comedian, and writer (born 1971)

- Occupations: Actor; comedian; writer; critic; television producer; editor; journalist
- Known for: Extras; Monkey Dust; There She Goes; Have I Got News for You; The Increasingly Poor Decisions of Todd Margaret

Shaun Pye (born December 1971) is an English comedian, actor, writer, and television producer, known for co-creating the animated sketch comedy Monkey Dust with Harry Thompson, and for his role as Greg Lindley-Jones on Ricky Gervais's and Stephen Merchant's sitcom Extras. Pye created and wrote There She Goes.

== Career ==
A former comedy critic for the Evening Standard and editor of Tough Puzzles, Pye has performed as a comedian. He is, however, known best for his work as a writer, having written for series including Never Mind the Buzzcocks, They Think It's All Over, Armstrong and Miller, Friday Night with Jonathan Ross, Would I Lie to You?, and Channel 4's The 100 Greatest Cartoons. He also worked as one of the head writers on 8 Out of 10 Cats alongside presenter Jimmy Carr and fellow comedian Frankie Boyle.

He first met his comedy partner Harry Thompson while working on The 11 O'Clock Show, and together they created the dark satirical animation Monkey Dust, which broadcast on BBC Three for three series. The pair collaborated with Alan Connor in 2006 to create Respectable, a sitcom for channel Five about a suburban brothel. Following Thompson's death from lung cancer in 2005, Shaun took over production of the show. He also co-produced the short-lived quiz show It's Only TV... But I Like It.

Pye co-created The Increasingly Poor Decisions of Todd Margaret with comedian David Cross for Channel 4.

As of October 2015, Pye is a "Programme Associate" on the BBC comedy panel show Have I Got News for You.

Pye was the creator and writer of There She Goes, a 2018 programme on BBC Four about a family with a learning disability. It was based on Pye's experiences with his daughter, who was born in 2006 with a chromosomal disorder.

From 2019 to 2022, Pye was a writer on Frankie Boyle's New World Order.

In 2021, he co-wrote the second series of Jerk, alongside Tim Renkow. Pye also appeared as a paramedic in one episode of the show.

== Acting filmography ==
List of appearances, with year, title, and role shown
Year	Title	Role	Notes
2005	Nathan Barley	Ricky	1 episode
2005	The Robinsons	Willie	1 episode
2005–2007	Extras	Greg Lindley-Jones	7 episodes
2006	Respectable	Nico	1 episode
2012	A Young Doctor's Notebook & Other Stories	Yegorych	3 episodes
2012, 2016	The Increasingly Poor Decisions of Todd Margaret	Dreamz Mattress man / morgue assistant Poots	2 episodes
2018	Bliss	pier carney guy	1 episode
2018–2020	There She Goes	Peter	1 episode
2021	Jerk	paramedic	1 episode
