= The Increasingly Poor Decisions of Todd Margaret =

British-American comedy TV series (2010–2016)

- Genre: Sitcom; Black comedy
- Created by: David Cross
- Written by: David Cross; Shaun Pye; Mark Chappell
- Directed by: Anthony & Joe Russo; Alex Hardcastle; Ben Gregor
- Starring: David Cross; Sharon Horgan; Blake Harrison; Will Arnett; Spike Jonze; Sara Pascoe; Amber Tamblyn; Russ Tamblyn; Jack McBrayer
- Composer: Johnny Marr
- Countries of origin: United Kingdom; United States
- Original language: English
- No. of seasons: 3
- No. of episodes: 18

Production
- Executive producers: Clelia Mountford; David Cross
- Camera setup: Single-camera
- Running time: 22 minutes
- Production companies: RDF Television (seasons 1–2); Merman (season 3); IFC Original Productions

Original release
- Network: IFC (United States); More4 (United Kingdom)
- Release: October 1, 2010 – January 14, 2016

The Increasingly Poor Decisions of Todd Margaret is a black comedy television series starring David Cross, Sharon Horgan, Blake Harrison, Will Arnett, Spike Jonze, Sara Pascoe Amber Tamblyn, Russ Tamblyn, and Jack McBrayer. The series is produced by IFC and RDF Television and premiered on October 1, 2010, on IFC.

== Premise ==
=== Seasons one and two ===
The first two seasons of the series tell a single story—that of American office temp worker Todd Margaret (David Cross). After overhearing Todd recite jargon from a self-help CD and confusing it for his being on a call with a customer, ultra-aggressive executive Brent Wilts (Will Arnett) promotes Todd on the spot.

Todd is put in charge of Thunder Muscle, a new energy drink his company is seeking to sell in the United Kingdom. Todd's UK office has only one employee, Dave (Blake Harrison), who offers his full assistance in helping Todd promote and sell the product in Britain. Most of the humor in season 1 and season 2 focuses on Todd Margaret's not being familiar with British culture and customs. His situation is compounded by the fact that Todd lies to cover up his lack of experience running a company, while Dave provides Todd with false information about British culture in order to constantly humiliate and sabotage him. Todd is infatuated with a local cafe owner Alice Bell (Sharon Horgan). Several of Todd's most damning lies are motivated by his desire to impress Alice and to manipulate her into a relationship with him.

During season 1, a cold open at the start of each episode depicts Todd before a British court as various charges against him are read out. A subplot involves Todd's supervisor Doug Whitney (Spike Jonze). Upset at having been fired by Brent, Doug learns that Brent Wilts is not really a company executive. Doug then investigates Brent for fraud.

For the bulk of season 1, Brent is shown as a foul-mouthed, abusive superior towards Todd, constantly demanding unrealistic results in terms of timetables for getting Thunder Muscle onto the British marketplace. Brent also demands that profits from the drink be delivered to him personally, so as to pay for his hookers and his gambling losses.

By the end of season 1, it is revealed that Brent is, in truth, a mild-mannered pushover like Todd, and that he has been promoted by the owner of his and Todd's company, a mysterious individual known as Mountford. Brent has been ordered by Mountford to promote Todd and to push him with unachievable expectations that Todd has no hope of meeting, thereby dooming Todd to failure.

Season 2 features Todd being reunited with his father, who offers to try to help his son avoid prison. Meanwhile, Alice, Brent, and Doug try to find out the truth about Mountford.

Todd gives Alice a fraudulent liquor license for her cafe in an attempt to buy her love, resulting in her cafe being shut down and a warrant put out on her arrest because of said fake liquor license. Alice investigates the situation and finds damning evidence that might free Todd and incriminate Dave. But she is killed when Todd unwittingly detonates a truck bomb while she is on her way to the court to reveal Dave's actions.

In the end, Brent attempts (and fails) to defend Todd in court as Doug discovers that Mountford is Dave, the son of a rich and powerful Lord. Several months prior, while visiting the U.S., Dave was at a bar, and a nervous Brent spilled drinks on him. Dave finds that his date at the bar has been stolen by Todd, who, exploiting Dave's brief absence to go get drinks, lured Dave's intoxicated date back to his home for sex. Humiliated and desiring revenge, Dave paid the bartender for information about the two men, then set about formulating a complicated revenge scheme to punish and humiliate both of them.

Todd is found guilty; but Dave's father, a high-ranking member of the House of Lords, arranges for the whole mess to get resolved, having grown tired both of the atrocious behavior of his son as well as of the scandal that Dave's and Todd's mishaps had caused England.

The elder Mountford arranges a pardon for Todd, on the condition that he leave England. Mountford, Sr. also reveals that Todd's American citizenship has been revoked on account of his actions, and the only countries that are willing to take him are the Turks and Caicos Islands and North Korea. Todd chooses North Korea due to his associating Turks and Caicos with the Turks who had been using him to plan a terrorist bombing.

When Todd arrives in North Korea, he is manipulated by the North Korean dictatorship to launch their first-ever nuclear weapon (a discussion at the launch control panel being the source of the cold openings for a second season). Todd pushes the button, bringing about a nuclear holocaust that seemingly destroys the rest of the world as well as all of the other characters, with the notable exception of the lone survivor, a Turkish terrorist who wanted to blow himself up in an act of terrorism during the course of the series—as he notes in the final line of the season, "There is a certain irony to [it]."

=== Season three ===
Season three of the series is a continuation that reframes the first two seasons as a dream due to the apocalyptic nature of the season two finale. David Cross returns, playing a new version of his character. Jack McBrayer joins the cast.

Over the course of the third season, a radically different Todd Margaret (closer to the brash, abrasive Brent from the first two seasons) encounters different versions of characters from the earlier episodes, all while a prophecy of a "catalyst" destined to destroy the world is worshipped by a mysterious cult.

Gradually, the new Todd becomes aware of the events from previous seasons and tries to make changes to prevent his destiny to destroy the world with North Korean red button. These prove to be increasingly disastrous, resulting in Todd immediately throwing his trust to the new version of Alice (who is revealed to be a white supremacist in this reality) and alienating his new assistant Dave (who in this reality is completely innocent of any wrongdoings but forms a legitimate hatred for Todd).

It quickly becomes clear that every decision to prevent the end of the world is the poor decision and the universe itself conspires to force Todd to press the red button.

Finally Todd accepts the inevitable and presses the red button, only for the "North Korean army" to be part of an elaborate game show.

Reality immediately collapses and Todd awakens from a dream back in season one, implying that the vast majority of the three seasons were possibly a surreal nightmare or that Todd himself is permanently trapped in different versions of reality where he is doomed to failure.

== Cast ==
=== Main cast ===
- David Cross as Todd Margaret: An American originally hired as a temp worker who is promoted overnight to be chief marketer of the Thunder Muscle energy drink in the UK, a position for which he is wildly unqualified. He is quick to tell implausible lies to impress Alice or to get out of uncomfortable situations. In season 3, Todd is sent to the London office of Global National to resolve sales issues.
- Sharon Horgan as Alice Bell: The Irish owner of a cafe near Todd's flat. She aspires to turn her cafe into a showcase for molecular gastronomy. Todd develops a crush on her the first time they meet. Although she finds him annoying and unattractive, she continually takes pity on Todd and helps him out. In the third season, Alice is now the owner of The Molecule, a prestigious molecular gastronomy restaurant, and the leader of a white supremacist group.
- Blake Harrison as Dave: Todd's sole employee, who often seems to take advantage of Todd's ignorance of British culture to pull pranks and make him appear foolish. As the series goes on, it is revealed he is actually David Mountford, the son of a rich and powerful lord called Lord Mountford (Mark Heap). Following a bar incident, in which Todd humiliated him, Dave arranged for Todd's (and Brent's) promotion to a management position so that he can secretly watch Todd fail at his job and life. In the original pilot episode, Dave was played by Russell Tovey. In the third season, Dave is a subordinate to Todd in the London office. He is now a legitimately eager employee trying to help Todd, but Todd's dream makes him distrust Dave.
- Will Arnett as Brent Wilts, Todd's superior, who uses excessive profanity and travels all over Europe, losing money in casinos and hiring prostitutes. Brent promoted Todd impulsively, mistakenly believing that Todd was a tough, take-no-prisoners businessman. He expects Todd to produce cash through sales to support Brent's decadent lifestyle. At the end of season one, it is revealed that Brent was promoted the same way Todd was. In season 3, he is subordinate to Todd and had been in charge of the London office.

=== Recurring cast ===
- Steve Davis as himself: hired by Todd (who, on bad advice from Dave, believes him to be "bigger than Beckham") to be the "face of Thunder Muscle".
- Colin Salmon as Hudson (seasons 1 and 2): Alice's Canadian ex-boyfriend who is currently in Leeds shooting an independent film. Todd's jealousy of Hudson prompts him to extreme behaviour in a futile attempt to monopolize Alice's attention. Hudson is quite blunt about having little respect for Todd. His film also seems not to have been received well by the local British population. In season 3, Hudson is a cartoon bear on television.
- Amber Tamblyn as Stephanie Daley: a girl who had a drunken one-night stand with Todd in seasons 1 and 2. Also plays a news reporter by the same name. In season 3, she is Todd's steady girlfriend.
- Russ Tamblyn as Chuck Margaret (seasons 1 and 2) and Billy the Cheesegrater (season 3): Todd's father who comes to Britain after seeing Todd's debacle at the Remembrance Day ceremony, deciding Todd "needed a hand". Chuck is slightly less bumbling than Todd. In the third season, he is an incredibly slow assassin called "Billy the Cheesegrater".
- Jon Hamm as himself: Dave's personal servant at his mansion, listed simply as "Dave's Employee" in the credits. However, it is later revealed that the character is in fact a fictionalized version of the real Jon Hamm, having had his services bought out from the Mad Men production by Dave to record the "self-help" CDs that Todd and Brent use. Hamm is mentioned in the third-season premiere, Todd Margaret Part 1, and was seen briefly as the agitated driver of a white van.
- Sara Pascoe as Pam: Todd's pregnant, promiscuous neighbor in seasons 1 and 2. In season 3, she remains Todd's neighbor, but is a conceptual artist (Pascoe originally played a woman at a trivia machine in a pub whom Todd tries to sell Thunder Muscle to in the 2009 pilot episode).
- Mark Heap as Lord Mountford: Dave's father who is an incredibly powerful British Lord and is responsible for sending Todd to North Korea in Season 2's finale. In Season 3, he is Todd's boss at Global National.

== 2009 pilot ==
The series originated as an episode of Channel 4's Comedy Showcase in November 2009. This backdoor pilot follows the same narrative arc as the season one premiere episode. The character of Dave is played by Russell Tovey. Tovey's obligations to the show Being Human conflicted with the subsequent sitcom. The role was recast with Blake Harrison and Tovey's scenes were reshot. Additionally, the pilot episode length was 24 minutes rather than the series 22 minute length.

== Episodes ==
Season	Episodes	Originally released	
Season	Episodes	First released	Last released
1	6	October 1, 2010	November 5, 2010
2	6	January 6, 2012	February 10, 2012
3	6	January 7, 2016	January 14, 2016

=== Season 1 (2010) ===
No. overall	No. in season	Title	Directed by	Written by	Original release date
1	1	"In Which Claims Are Made and a Journey Ensues"	Anthony & Joe Russo (original pilot); Alex Hardcastle (first episode)	Shaun Pye & David Cross	October 1, 2010 (US); November 14, 2010 (UK)
Part-time office temp Todd Margaret is unexpectedly chosen to lead the UK launch of Thunder Muscle, a new North Korean energy drink of suspicious contents. Despite help from his new acquaintances, Dave and Alice, Todd struggles to make inroads. Note: 2 versions of this episode exist. The first, with Russell Tovey as Dave, aired on Channel 4's Comedy Showcase in the UK on November 27, 2009. Tovey's scenes were reshot with Blake Harrison when the full series went into production.
2	2	"A Plan Is Hatched and a Date Is Not a Date"	Alex Hardcastle	Shaun Pye & David Cross	October 8, 2010 (US); November 21, 2010 (UK)
Todd's new boss, Brent Wilts, turns up the heat to sell Thunder Muscle, so Todd hatches a plan to crack the British retail market, but he leaves the practical execution to Dave because he thinks he's scored a first date with Alice.
3	3	"The Snooker Player, the Black Canadian, the Turkish Terrorist, and the Peanut"	Alex Hardcastle	Shaun Pye & David Cross	October 15, 2010 (US); November 28, 2010 (UK)
Todd decides to launch Thunder Muscle with an advertisement featuring a celebrity endorsement; Dave sets up the meeting. Meanwhile, Todd's "relationship" with Alice goes to the next level: dinner at her flat
4	4	"In Which Brent Wilts Arrives and Things Take a Turn for the Worse"	Alex Hardcastle	Shaun Pye & David Cross	October 22, 2010 (US); December 5, 2010 (UK)
Wilts arrives in London demanding all the money from Thunder Muscle sales. Todd oversees the filming of his commercial and it seems he finally makes a breakthrough but...no.
5	5	"Where Todd and Brent Misjudge the Mood of a Solemn Day"	Alex Hardcastle	Shaun Pye & David Cross	October 29, 2010 (US); December 12, 2010 (UK)
With Wilts now maniacally demanding results, Todd finally takes initiative with a publicity stunt guaranteed to get Britain buzzing about Thunder Muscle. Meanwhile, Todd's former boss, Doug, is embarking on an investigation into Wilts's past.
6	6	"What Can Only Be Considered a Dreadful Day for Todd"	Alex Hardcastle	Shaun Pye & David Cross	November 5, 2010 (US); December 19, 2010 (UK)
Todd's world is falling apart, so he makes a final desperate bid for Alice's affections with even more spectacular lies. The various calamities Todd has embroiled himself in are starting to come to a head.

=== Season 2 (2012) ===
No. overall	No. in season	Title	Directed by	Story by	Teleplay by	Original release date
7	1	"Todd’s Terrible Day Ends and His Next Terrible Day Begins"	Ben Gregor	Shaun Pye & David Cross	Shaun Pye & David Cross & Mark Chappell	January 6, 2012 (US); March 5, 2013 (UK)
Picking up directly where season one left off, Todd has a lot of explaining to do: What was he doing in the Houses of Parliament? Why is there a blood-stained cardboard box on his floor that is labelled “ALICE RAPE KIT”? And what is his father doing outside the door if he supposedly died in a skydiving accident? Trying to talk his way out of trouble, Todd makes matters only worse. As if things weren't bad enough, a giant supermarket chain wants to sue Todd for 10 million pounds and the police want to question a man fitting Todd's description in connection with the sudden death of a Member of Parliament.
8	2	"Todd and his Valet Arrive in Leeds and What They Saw There"	Ben Gregor	Shaun Pye & David Cross	Shaun Pye & David Cross & Mark Chappell	January 13, 2012 (US); March 12, 2013 (UK)
Todd and Dave decide to take a trip to sell some Thunder Muscle. On the way, they stop at La Molecule, Alice's favorite restaurant, in an attempt to convince the chef to hire Alice so Todd can regain her favour. Todd complicates things by spinning a ridiculous lie. Todd arrives just in time for his big meeting with the chairman of the toughest rugby team in England. Having mere minutes to seal the deal of his career, and knowing nothing about rugby, Todd makes yet another poor decision.
9	3	"How The Liver and The Salad Conspired to Ruin Todd’s Good Deed"	Ben Gregor	Shaun Pye & David Cross	Shaun Pye & David Cross & Mark Chappell	January 20, 2012 (US); March 19, 2013 (UK)
High on morphine, Todd mistakes a small teddy bear for Hudson, Alice's former boyfriend, whom he rightly suspects of trying to win her back. Desperate to make it to La Molecule before Hudson, Todd steals a test tube of toxic spores on the way. Meanwhile, Brent Wilts and Doug Whitney, Todd's former boss back in Oregon, team up to track down the malevolent force that is "Mountford."
10	4	"In Which Todd Accidentally Learns a Secret and Brent and Doug Get Closer to Further From the Truth"	Ben Gregor	Shaun Pye & David Cross	Shaun Pye & David Cross & Mark Chappell	January 27, 2012 (US); March 26, 2013 (UK)
Wondering if she had the wrong idea about him, Alice visits Todd. After Todd's father leaves the country, Todd seeks solace in a pub, but instead finds himself enmeshed in a night of unimaginable debauchery in a hen party from hell.
11	5	"The Crime Scene, The Storyteller and the Sanctimonious Tower of Morality"	Ben Gregor	Shaun Pye & David Cross	Shaun Pye & David Cross & Mark Chappell	February 3, 2012 (US); April 2, 2013 (UK)
After a disastrous night, Todd finds himself in an even more disastrous situation. Alice is forced to run from the law when the police see the unauthorized liquor license Todd gave her. Trying to clear her name, Alice goes looking for Todd to have it out with him only to find him on television and in police custody.
12	6	"Conclusion"	Ben Gregor	Shaun Pye & David Cross	Shaun Pye & David Cross & Mark Chappell	February 10, 2012 (US); April 9, 2013 (UK)
Todd is on trial for his life. The public wants him to hang and that seems the most likely outcome. A number of "friendly" witnesses are called to the stand but each one backfires. Meanwhile, Alice struggles to find the evidence needed to clear both their names and is in a race against time to make it to the courthouse.

=== Season 3 (2016) ===
No. overall	No. in season	Title	Directed by	Written by	Original release date	U.S. viewers (millions)
13	1	"Todd Margaret Part 1"	John Hardwick	Shaun Pye & David Cross & Mark Chappell	January 7, 2016	0.078
14	2	"Todd Margaret Part 2"	John Hardwick	Shaun Pye & David Cross & Mark Chappell	January 7, 2016	0.063
15	3	"The Decisions of Todd Margaret"	John Hardwick	Shaun Pye & David Cross & Mark Chappell	January 7, 2016	0.036
16	4	"The Poor Decisions of Todd Margaret Part 1"	John Hardwick	Shaun Pye & David Cross & Mark Chappell	January 14, 2016	0.093
17	5	"The Poor Decisions of Todd Margaret Part 2"	John Hardwick	Shaun Pye & David Cross & Mark Chappell	January 14, 2016	0.060
18	6	"The Increasingly Poor Decisions of Todd Margaret"	John Hardwick	Shaun Pye & David Cross & Mark Chappell	January 14, 2016	0.039

== Production ==
The show was created by David Cross and written by Cross and Shaun Pye. The first season premiered October 1, 2010, on IFC in the U.S.; and on More4 in the UK on November 14, 2010. The second season was broadcast on Fox in the UK from March 5, 2013. David Cross announced that season 2 would be the final season, despite the network's wish for a third season.

The pilot was aired in the UK as an episode of the Channel 4 series Comedy Showcase. Scenes from the first episode were re-shot after the Channel 4 airing when the part of Margaret's assistant, Dave, was recast with Blake Harrison. Russell Tovey, who played the character in the original pilot, was no longer available when the series went into production.

The show reunites Cross with Arrested Development co-star Will Arnett; the two also appear together on the Fox sitcom Running Wilde, which premiered before, but was produced after, Todd Margaret.

David Cross mentioned on WTF with Marc Maron that he put his own money into financing the show.

In 2014, IFC renewed the series for a third season, which aired from January 7 to January 14, 2016.

Though no official announcement has been given yet, Cross indicated in an August 2016 interview with The A.V. Club that the show is done, and there will not be any more seasons.
