= Springfest =

Springfest is a common name for events occurring to celebrate the coming of spring:

- Spring Fest, popularly known as SF, an annual festival at the Indian Institute of Technology, Kharagpur, India
- The Florida SpringFest, a musical event in downtown Pensacola, Florida
- SpringFest, an annual festival held in Ballarat, Victoria Australia
- Springfest, an annual celebration in Ocean City, Maryland

== See also ==
- Spring Festival (disambiguation)
