= Lenin of the Rovers =

British radio comedy series

Lenin of the Rovers is a BBC Radio 4 comedy series from 1988 written by Marcus Berkmann, produced by Harry Thompson and starring comedian Alexei Sayle as Ricky Lenin, Russian captain of Felchester Rovers - Britain's only communist football team. Other regular players in the team were Stevie Stalin (played by Andrew McClean) and Terry Trotsky (played by Keith Allen in series 1 and by Phil Cornwell in series 2). The team was managed by Ray Royce and Colonel Brace-Cartwright (played by veteran actor Ballard Berkeley for Series 1 episodes 1 and 2. Berkeley died during recordings for the series and the part was then played by Donald Hewlett thereafter) who were frequently interviewed by Frank Lee Brian (played by real-life football commentator Kenneth Wolstenholme). John Sessions and Jim Broadbent made character appearances in Series 2. The title is a parody of the long-running football-themed comic strip, Roy of the Rovers.

Although a knowledge of football was useful for the appreciation of the series, it was not essential. The show parodied many aspects of British football culture in the late 1980s, such as the increasing commercialisation in the game, intrusive and rarely accurate media and fan violence. The script also made frequent use of Ricky Lenin's attempts to fit in with what he saw as a 'western lifestyle', in a similar way to some of Sayle's appearances as the Balowski Family in The Young Ones. Situations included the trouble caused by the ghost-writing of Ricky's column in The Daily Tits (parodying The Sun) (with guest appearance by Jacqueline Ashman as Curvy Corinne) - a complicated political treatise arguing in favour of collectivism in Lenin's original text is transformed by the newspaper's ghost writer to "I hate all paddies, but I wouldn't mind giving that Gloria Hunniford one" in the paper; the north–south economic divide in England ("In Crunchthorpe there's a hundred and three per cent unemployment. The Government uses the place to dump nuclear waste...they pile it up in the town centre, outside Freeman Hardy and Willis") and films The Titfield Thunderbolt and Apocalypse Now.

The script regularly took great delight in the unsophisticated nature of British football, with its traditional emphasis on strength over skill:

Northern pundit: "The average Crunchsider knows his football like the back of his hand and what he really likes to see is really elegant, skilful one-touch players...out in the middle of the park, screaming in agony, clutching their gonads."

Commentator: "So Crunchthorpe don't really go in for one-touch play, then?"

Northern pundit: "Oh, aye, they do. Provided the one touch is delivered just below the kneecaps like a steam hammer hitting an avocado..."

A running gag in the show was various characters (particularly Sayle) speaking lines from well known pop songs as dialogue. The fictional town of Felchester was a joke: a reference to felching, conflating that term with Melchester, the fictional home of Roy of the Rovers. In one episode, "The Fifth Man", the Cambridge Five spy scandal is mocked when Felchester plays Cambridge in the FA Cup and wins as a result of Cambridge players, including a mysterious fifth man, scoring own goals against their own team.

Lenin of the Rovers ran for two series, each comprising four shows. The final two episodes of series 2 were postponed due to the Hillsborough disaster, and were eventually aired sixteen years later in 2005.

The entire series was released via Audible on 1 June 2023.

== Episodes ==
=== Series 1 ===
Ep	Title	Original air date	Summary	Alexei's Notes
1	Up for the Coup	13 February 1988	Midfield football maestro Ricky Lenin's battle for Britain's first all-communist football team. Ricky introduces his radical thinking to Felchester Rovers.	The art of leadership consists in consolidating the attention of the people against a single adversary and taking care that nothing will split up that attention.
2	Felcherama	20 February 1988	Ricky Lenin's new economic policy kicks in at Felchester Rovers football club.	Frankly admitting a mistake, ascertaining the reasons for it, analysing the conditions which led to it, and thoroughly discussing it - that is the earmark of a serious party, that is the way it should perform its duties.
3	The Fifth Man	27 February 1988	Felchester Rover's midfield-maestro Ricky Lenin tackles fearsome Cambridge by infiltrating their team.	If we succeed, then the revolutionary conflagration will spread. The revolutionary wave will convert an epoch of a few revolutionary years into an epoch of several revolutionary decades.
4	Max Gut	5 March 1988	Britain's first communist football team tackles Germany. But what about the revolution?	Before everything else, we must save the revolution, and we can save it only by signing peace terms with the Germans. Better a split than the danger of an overthrow of the revolution.

=== Series 2 ===
Ep	Title	Original air date	Channel	Summary
1	Ghosts and Goolies	1 April 1989	BBC Radio 4	Ricky Lenin decides to write a column in a tabloid newspaper, but ends up learning a few painful lessons about life, love, truth, and Gloria Hunniford.
2	The Felchester Firm	8 April 1989	BBC Radio 4	Ricky's boys are drawn against the North East's notoriously hard team Crunchthorpe United.
3	Apocalypse Des	8 April 2005	BBC Radio 7	Felchester Rovers take a break in the socialist idyll of El Telvador - but a civil war is raging.
4	The Final Solution	15 April 2005	BBC Radio 7	Will Ricky's million-pound sponsorship deal wreck Felchester's hopes of a Wembley victory?

Episodes 3 and 4 of series 2 were cancelled from their original scheduled broadcast dates of 15 April and 22 April 1989 respectively due to the Hillsborough disaster, and were not broadcast until the series was repeated on BBC 7 in April 2005. However, the whole of series 2 was released by the BBC as a double-cassette set in 1992.
