= Helen Modern =

English actress

- Born: 16 February 1983 (age 43); Chester, England
- Education: Queen Margaret University
- Occupation: Actress

Helen Modern (born 16 February 1983) is an English actress best known for her recurring role as Naomi in British sitcom Respectable on Five. She trained at the School of Drama at Edinburgh's Queen Margaret University. In 2006, she starred in the eighth series of ITV1 drama Bad Girls as inmate Stella Gough, the daughter of Governing Governor Joy Masterton. As well as her featured roles in Respectable and Bad Girls, Modern has also had a recurring role in BBC One daytime soap opera Doctors (2005) as Diane Bishop, and various roles in No Angels, Wire in the Blood, The Chase and Messiah – The Harrowing with Ken Stott and Maxine Peake.

== Other roles ==
In 2008, Modern featured as mouthy rock chick Sasha Reed on the new Shed Productions commission Rock Rivals, as well as working with comedy writer Jeremy Dyson on his new commission for BBC. She also shot a series of commercials with director James Griffiths for the new "Pasta Hut" pizza hut commercials.

== Early life ==
Modern was born in Chester, and grew up in Preston.

Her drama school training took place at Queen Margaret University, Edinburgh where she graduated with a BA degree with distinction in acting in 2004.
