= Morphine (film) =

2008 Russian drama film

- DVD cover
- Directed by: Aleksei Balabanov
- Written by: Mikhail Bulgakov; Sergei Bodrov, Jr.
- Starring: Leonid Bichevin; Ingeborga Dapkūnaitė; Andrei Panin
- Cinematography: Alexandr Simonov
- Release date: 27 November 2008
- Country: Russia
- Language: Russian

Morphine (Russian: Морфий, romanized: Morphiy) is a 2008 Russian film directed by Aleksei Balabanov, using the script by Sergei Bodrov Jr., loosely based on the semi-autobiographical short stories by Mikhail Bulgakov. The 1925–1926 short stories themselves were inspired by Bulgakov's experiences as a newly graduated young doctor in 1916–18.

== Plot ==
The film takes place in late autumn and early winter of 1917 during the events of the October Revolution and the beginning of the Russian Civil War. A young Russian doctor called Mikhail Polyakov (Leonid Bichevin) arrives at a small hospital in a remote village in Yaroslavl Governorate. Having freshly graduated from medical school, with little experience, he is the only doctor in the rural district. He works hard, earning the respect of his small staff (one paramedic and two nurses).

After an allergic reaction to a diphtheria vaccination, he has his nurse Anna give him morphine to negate the effects. Gradually he slips into addiction.

== Soundtrack ==
Songs performed by Alexander Vertinsky – "Tango Magnolia", "Snow Lullaby", "Cocainetka" – were used in the soundtrack of the film.

== Awards ==
At the 2009 Russian Guild of Film Critics Awards Aleksei Balabanov was the recipient of the White Elephant award for Best Director, as well as the 2009 Award of the Federal Foreign Office.

== See also ==
- A Young Doctor's Notebook, 2012–13 Sky Arts television adaptation of the same Bulgakov stories
- Aleksei Balabanov, director of Morphine
