= My Life in Film =

- Genre: Sitcom
- Created by: Mark Chappell
- Written by: Mark Chappell
- Directed by: Toby MacDonald
- Starring: Kris Marshall; Andrew Scott; Alice Lowe
- Country of origin: United Kingdom
- Original language: English
- No. of seasons: 1
- No. of episodes: 6

Production
- Executive producers: Kenton Allen; Sophie Clarke-Jervoise
- Producer: Paul Schlesinger

Original release
- Network: BBC Three
- Release: 19 October – 23 November 2004

My Life in Film is a British television situation-comedy series written by Mark Chappell and originally aired on BBC Three. It was directed by first-time television director Toby MacDonald.

It uses iconography, situations and dialogue from films. Some of the show's humour is derived from the deliberate adaptation of these films to everyday settings, leading to preposterous results.

The series ran for one season of six episodes in 2004.

== The characters ==
The main character, Art Chapel (played by Kris Marshall) is an aspiring low-budget film-maker with an overactive imagination. The other characters are Jones (Andrew Scott), and Beth (Alice Lowe).

=== Arthur ("Art") ===
Art is the central character. He is a no-hoper dreaming of being a film director. Art constantly describes himself as "an independent low-budget filmmaker", despite having never made a film. He is continually coming up with ideas for storylines, and has written many scripts of apparently dubious quality.

=== Jones ===
Jones is Art's long-suffering best friend. They share a London flat in a small, old apartment complex. Jones is frequently the sufferer of mishaps brought about by Art's inability to deal with the real world, yet appears to need to look after him despite Art's many faults.

=== Beth ===
Beth is Jones's girlfriend. She and Art have an antagonistic attitude towards each other, largely because Beth can see how Art's lack of abilities is impinging on Jones's life. In response Art claims to be allergic to Beth. Despite this, as the series progresses there is a slow thawing in the relationship between Beth and Art, and in the final episode she decides to move in with Jones, even though this would mean sharing a flat with Art.

== The episodes ==
None of the episodes are named, but each is based on the plot and style of a particular film. The episodes were re-ordered for their BBC Three broadcast; on the subsequent BBC Two repeat run, the original order was restored.

| # | Name | Airdate | Overview |
|---|---|---|---|
| 1 | Rear Window | 26 October 2004 | A keen observer of human nature, Art watches happily from his bedroom window as the beautiful girl named Anna (Sophie Hunter) in the flat opposite argues with her lover. But when she disappears and he works late into the night with a circular saw, Art comes to the only logical conclusion. It has to be murder. He wanted the relationship to end, but not like this. Jones wants to call the police, but first they need evidence. And there's only one place to look. Under the watchful eye of Jones, Art breaks into the flat opposite, only to return as clue-less as before. They resort to plan B and try to lure the killer out into the open. It works better than expected: they manage to lure him around to their flat... |
| 2 | The Shining | 2 November 2004 | The last time Art looked after little Danny, he chased his nephew into the attic with an axe. The parents still haven't forgotten; Art maintains it was an accident. And so it is with no little trepidation that Art is asked to babysit again. Surely, it can't happen twice, can it? Uncle Art is trying to write. Constant interruptions shatter his concentration. Cabin fever quickly sets in. He can hear footsteps on the roof. Jones dismisses these fears, encourages Art to take some air. But like chicken pox, paranoia is contagious. Alone in the house with Danny, Jones now hears the footsteps. He tries not to panic, but fails miserably. Art returns home to scenes of mayhem. Locked out, he fetches the axe to break down the door... |
| 3 | Top Gun | 19 October 2004 | After failing his driving test for the fifth time, Art signs up for a five-day crash course at The Best of the Best Motor School – they're the best! The training is intense. And so are the rivalries. Everybody wants to be the best of THE BEST OF THE BEST. Especially Johnson: this ice-cold learner driver takes an instant dislike to Art. Meanwhile, Art takes an instant like to his beautiful instructor. And as she teaches him to parallel park, they begin to fall in love. For once, it really looks as if Art might pass, until a minor road accident rocks his confidence. Will his new-found love chase away his inner demons in time to take the test? |
| 4 | Shallow Grave | 9 November 2004 | Friction between Art and Beth intensifies as she comes to stay for the week. It pre-occupies Jones so much, he forgets to feed the neighbour's goldfish – with tragic results. In the aftermath of the goldfish's untimely death, Art discovers an insignificant sum of money down the back of the sofa. Our trio agrees to put it back, but an atmosphere of deceit and betrayal soon descends on the household. Alliances, allegiances and allergies reach breaking point when the money goes missing. Suspicions multiply and tempers fray as guilt and greed propel the story to its bloody conclusion. And when the merry-go-round of treachery finally comes to a stop, who will come out on top? |
| 5 | 8½ | 16 November 2004 | Art finally gets the chance to prove himself as an undiscovered talented independent low-budget filmmaker when he is asked to shoot a wedding video. The initial flurry of ambitious, original ideas soon gives way to a mammoth existential crisis. It grips Art by the throat and refuses to let go. Fear of the blank page keeps him awake at night. Thoroughly blocked, he sinks into a dark malaise. In search of inspiration, Art embarks on a filmmaker's odyssey through a sea of dream, memory, fantasy and beautiful women. Pressure mounts as time begins to run out. But it is in the depths of his despair that he finds a ray of hope in the most unlikely of sources... |
| 6 | Butch Cassidy and the Sundance Kid | 23 November 2004 | Under pressure from the landlord to come up with the rent money, Art resorts to increasingly desperate measures to raise the cash. An attempt to defraud the bank incurs the wrath of a super-posse of postmen. Art and Jones run for the hills on their bicycles. The landlord also gives chase. The boys seek refuge in the cinema. With nowhere left to hide, Art tries to persuade Jones to start a new life together on the Isle of Man. Legend has it the Film Commission over there just gives money away to independent low-budget filmmakers. Jones is tempted, but refuses to leave Beth behind. So they take her with them. But all they find on the Isle of Man is disappointment. They have no choice but to return to their old ways. Will they find the rent money before the landlord finds them? |
