= Jerk (TV series) =

- Genre: Comedy
- Created by: Stu Richards
- Written by: Tim Renkow; Stu Richards; Shaun Pye; Alex Smith
- Directed by: Tom McKay
- Starring: Tim Renkow; Sharon Rooney; Rob Madin; Lorraine Bracco
- Country of origin: United Kingdom
- Original language: English
- No. of series: 3
- No. of episodes: 14

Production
- Executive producers: Mat Steiner; Ash Atalla; Alex Smith
- Producer: Rebecca Murrell
- Editor: Calum Ross
- Running time: 20 minutes

Original release
- Network: BBC Three
- Release: 24 February 2019 – 28 March 2023

Jerk is a British black comedy television series starring and co-written by Tim Renkow. It centres around Tim (played by Renkow), a man with cerebral palsy who tries to use his condition to his advantage. The character of Tim is based upon Renkow, who also has cerebral palsy. The series built upon a 2016 BBC production, A Brief History of Tim.

Jerk first aired on 24 February 2019 on BBC Three. In September 2019, it was reported that BBC Three had ordered a second series before the first had aired. The second series premiered on BBC Three on 1 August 2021. The show was renewed for a third series in 2022.

== Plot ==
Tim (Tim Renkow) has cerebral palsy, and is also a terrible person. He attempts to take maximum advantage of his condition by being insufferable to those around him. In Season 1, Tim faces deportation due to the impending expiration of his visa, and makes various attempts to ward off this fate.

== Cast ==
=== Series 1 ===
- Tim Renkow as Tim
- Sharon Rooney as Ruth, Tim's care-worker
- Rob Madin as Idris, Tim's friend and employment consultant
- Lorraine Bracco as Tim's mother
- Karl Theobald as Shaun
- Lee Ridley as Kiefer
- David Calder as Great Uncle Thomas

== Episodes ==
=== Series overview ===
Series	Episodes	Originally released
1	4	24 February 2019
2	4	1 August 2021
3	6	14 March 2023

=== Series 1 (2019) ===
No. overall	No. in series	Title	Directed by	Written by	Original release date
1	1	"Quota"	Tom McKay	Tim Renkow, Stu Richards, Shaun Pye	24 February 2019
Tim is employed by a greeting card company headed by Shaun (Karl Theobald), but takes excessive advantage of his disabled status.
2	2	"Refugee"	Tom McKay	Tim Renkow, Stu Richards, Shaun Pye	24 February 2019
Tim concocts a false personal history about being a refugee in order to receive free meals, but quickly becomes tangled in a web of deceit.
3	3	"Nemesis"	Tom McKay	Tim Renkow, Stu Richards, Shaun Pye	24 February 2019
Tim's mother suggests that he get married in order to avoid deportation. After a failed attempt at internet dating, he meets Clara (Izuka Hoyle) and invites her to an art exhibition by his old enemy, Kiefer (Lee Ridley).
4	4	"Genes"	Tom McKay	Shaun Pye, Alex Smith, Tim Renkow	24 February 2019
Tim's deportation is averted when it is discovered he has British ancestry, but his encounter with Great Uncle Thomas (David Calder), does not go smoothly.

=== Series 2 (2021) ===
No. overall	No. in series	Title	Directed by	Written by	Original release date
5	1	"Episode 1"	Tom McKay	Tim Renkow, Shaun Pye	1 August 2021
Having narrowly escaped deportation to the USA, Tim has found himself a loophole and landed a place on a postgraduate course in London.
6	2	"Episode 2"	Tom McKay	Tim Renkow, Shaun Pye	1 August 2021
Following a car accident, Tim is referred for personal training to build up his strength, but he gets more than he bargained for with ex-Paralympian PT Claire, known as The Wrecking Ball.
7	3	"Episode 3"	Tom McKay	Tim Renkow, Shaun Pye	1 August 2021
After terrifying a group of young kids, Tim is invited by well-intentioned but misguided teacher Marcus to run a disability workshop for children.
8	4	"Episode 4"	Tom McKay	Tim Renkow, Shaun Pye	1 August 2021
After being mistaken for an addict, Tim is welcomed in by an eccentric religious community who set their sights on his spiritual health.

=== Series 3 (2023) ===
No. overall	No. in series	Title	Directed by	Written by	Original release date
9	1	"Episode 1"	Tom McKay	Tim Renkow, Shaun Pye	14 March 2023
An open casting for actors in a period biopic leads Tim to a role as an extra, which quickly turns to him replacing James Norton as the disabled lead, with chaotic results.
10	2	"Episode 2"	Tom McKay	Tim Renkow, Shaun Pye	14 March 2023
Tim gets scouted as a drug dealer but soon realises it isn’t as fun as it looks on TV, while Ruth is left to look after his new care dog, Snuffles.
11	3	"Episode 3"	Tom McKay	Tim Renkow, Shaun Pye	21 March 2023
Following his 15 minutes of movie star fame, Tim is invited to Parliament to take part in a select committee for the new disability funding act. Way out of his depth, Tim bumps into a familiar face at the committee.
12	3	"Episode 4"	Tom McKay	Tim Renkow, Shaun Pye	21 March 2023
Lily and Tim have just a day to hire enough disabled talent to put on a showcase and scam Tim’s nemesis, Kiefer, who wants to buy them. But it’s not as easy as they thought.
13	5	"Episode 5"	Tom McKay	Tim Renkow, Shaun Pye	28 March 2023
After a surprise announcement, Idris organises a night to remember for Tim. Not everyone agrees with his idea of a good time, so Ruth takes matters into her own hands.
14	6	"Episode 6"	Tom McKay	Tim Renkow, Shaun Pye	28 March 2023
Lily’s plan to scam the venue for a free wedding is thrown into jeopardy when Tim tries to help. Someone unexpected comes to Idris’s rescue during an existential crisis.

== Reception ==
Reviewing the first series of the show in Guardian, Stuart Jeffries describes Renkow as "Larry David with a twist". In The Times, Carol Midgley gave the second series of the show a positive review, comparing it favourably to Curb Your Enthusiasm: "[..] both series push the boundaries splendidly into dark, dark humour and political incorrectness and both have selfish, thrillingly unlikeable lead characters."
