= Harry Thompson =

English novelist and biographer

- Publicity photograph
- Born: 6 February 1960; London, England
- Died: 7 November 2005 (aged 45); London, England
- Occupations: Radio and television producer; comedy writer; novelist; biographer

Harry William Thompson (6 February 1960 – 7 November 2005) was an English radio and television producer, comedy writer, novelist and biographer. He was the creator of the dark humour television series Monkey Dust, screened between 2003 and 2005.

Born in London, Thompson was educated at Highgate School and Brasenose College, Oxford, then joined the BBC as a trainee in 1981. He soon focused his attention on comedy, working as a researcher for Not the Nine O'Clock News and BBC Radio's The Mary Whitehouse Experience. Rising to the level of producer, he produced the BBC radio shows The News Quiz and Lenin of the Rovers. Hat Trick Productions subsequently employed Thompson to produce a television adaptation of The News Quiz, entitled Have I Got News for You, a critical and commercial success which Thompson produced for five years before moving onto other projects.

A biographer and novelist, Thompson wrote six books: an investigation into the story of The Man in the Iron Mask; a biography of Hergé with a commentary on his Adventures of Tintin series; biographies of Peter Cook and Richard Ingrams; a novel, This Thing of Darkness; and the semi-autobiographical Penguins Stopped Play.

== Biography ==
=== Early life and career: 1960–1989 ===
Harry William Thompson was born on 6 February 1960 in London. His father was a marketing manager who worked for The Guardian, while his mother was a teacher who campaigned for higher standards in education. He attended the private, fee-paying school Highgate School before going on to study History at Brasenose College, Oxford. There he became editor of the university newspaper, Cherwell, working alongside arts editor Roly Keating, the future controller of BBC2.

After leaving university, he joined the BBC as a trainee in 1981. Here, he worked on the late-night news programme Newsnight, later commenting that it was "the most awful experience of my life, full of people who barked into phones, professionally". Switching his focus to comedy, he worked as a researcher for BBC2's Not the Nine O'Clock News and for various comedy shows on BBC Radio, including BBC Radio 4's The Mary Whitehouse Experience. Rising to the level of producer, he was responsible for the production of long-established show The News Quiz as well as Alexei Sayle's new comedy series, Lenin of the Rovers (1988). The Guardian would note that at this time he established himself as "a maverick" who pushed established boundaries with "outrageous jokes".

=== Panel shows and early writing: 1990–98 ===
During the 1980s several independent producers realised that BBC Radio 4 had a number of comedy shows that could be successfully converted to television. Among them was the company Hat Trick Productions, who decided to adapt The News Quiz for television in 1989. Jimmy Mulville, the company's managing director, asked Thompson to produce this venture, which first appeared in 1990 as Have I Got News For You. Thompson selected Angus Deayton to present the show, with Ian Hislop and Paul Merton as the team leaders. He oversaw the production of the show for 93 episodes over five series. He later remarked that when the show first began, he was extremely confident, considering it to be "the best comedy show on TV. It never occurred to me that anything else could be better. ... I know it sounds arrogant." Have I Got News For You initially screened on BBC2, but proved enough of a success that by 2000 it had been moved to BBC1.

Moving on to produce other comedy panel shows, in 1995 he began work on They Think It's All Over, a BBC sports show. He followed this in 1996 by the creation of a music quiz show, Never Mind the Buzzcocks. In 1998 he was part of BBC Radio 4's five-part political satire programme Cartoons, Lampoons, and Buffoons.

=== Later comedy career: 1998–2005 ===
In 1998 Thompson produced and co-wrote the first series of Channel 4's The 11 O'Clock Show, where he was instrumental in the creation of the comic character Ali G, played by Sacha Baron Cohen. Thompson later wrote for spin-off Da Ali G Show. Defending the humour in the show, he publicly announced that "You'll never see anything PC or right-on in my shows. I get accused quite a lot of straying into bad taste, but I think you can laugh at almost anything."

In 2003, Thompson, alongside Shaun Pye, created and wrote the adult cartoon comedy Monkey Dust. The programme was known for its dark humour and handling of taboo topics such as bestiality, murder, suicide and paedophilia. There were three series broadcast on BBC Three between 2003 and 2005; no further series were made following Thompson's death from lung cancer. In 2003 The Observer listed him as one of the 50 funniest or most influential people in British comedy, citing Monkey Dust as evidence: "the most subversive show on television. The topical animated series is dark and unafraid to tackle taboo subjects such as paedophilia, taking us to Cruel Britannia, a creepy place where the public are hoodwinked by arrogant politicians and celebrities. This edgy show doesn't always work, but when it does there is nothing quite like it". More recently a Guardian critic called it "a wonderful programme... perhaps the best thing in Thompson's formidable CV".

Thompson's last broadcast work was the Channel 5 sitcom Respectable, on which he finished work the week before he died. Co-written with Shaun Pye, the programme was set in a suburban brothel and aired in 2006. The Guardian criticised the programme's "woefully old-fashioned, juvenile outlook" and called it "drearily unsophisticated". The programme was also criticised in some quarters on the grounds that it made light of prostitution.

=== Other work ===
Thompson also produced non-comedy documentaries for BBC Radio. He made several programmes with writer/presenter Terence Pettigrew, starting with anniversary tributes to Hollywood icons James Dean (You're Tearing Me Apart) and Montgomery Clift (I Had The Misery Thursday). Pettigrew and Thompson subsequently worked together on a second series of documentaries, including on national service (Caught in the Draft), and also about the evacuation of children from major British cities during the Second World War (Nobody Cried When The Trains Pulled Out). Both programmes were presented by Michael Aspel.

As well as writing for television, Thompson wrote biographies of Hergé (1991), Private Eye editor Richard Ingrams (1994) (of which The Independent said, "The problem is that Thompson simply worships Ingrams, and his biography melts steadily into hagiography ... [an] overlong panegyric") and Peter Cook (1997). His novel This Thing of Darkness, a historical fiction about Charles Darwin and Robert FitzRoy, the captain of the Beagle, was longlisted for the Booker Prize in 2005. Thompson described Fitzroy, rather than Darwin, as the book's hero:

At its heart, it is the true story of someone who epitomised a certain sort of person that this country produced in the 19th century. There was a fantasy of chivalric empire, run by Britons who were gentlemen and played the game. Of course the reality was that our empire was no better than any other. We were busy conniving in the extermination of tribes, robbing natives of their land and we sent droves of brilliant young men, brought up with the chivalric fantasy, to enforce what was in many cases a visibly corrupt system [...] But Fitzroy's morality was iron. He said no. And it destroyed him.

His final book, the semi-autobiographical Penguins Stopped Play, was finished in 2005; it dealt with his amateur cricket team, the Captain Scott XI, and was published posthumously in 2006.

=== Personal life and death ===
Thompson was married to Fiona Duff. They had two children, Betty and Bill. The breakdown of their marriage became public in 1997 when Duff wrote an article about Thompson's affair with a 25-year-old woman (later revealed to be Victoria Coren) in the Daily Mail. In 2003, Thompson began a relationship with Lisa Whadcock; they met after she wrote a fan letter to him about Monkey Dust.

Despite never having been a smoker, Thompson was diagnosed with lung cancer in April 2005. He was treated at a London hospital, and married Whadcock on Monday 7 November 2005, before dying later that day. The British Comedy Awards had planned to present him with a Jury's Award in December, with executive producer Michael Hurll stating that "It's sad he won't be there to receive it, but the legacy of his enduringly popular series lives on". Upon learning of his death, BBC One controller Peter Fincham said Thompson was "that rarity in television – the talented, single-minded, subversive maverick" and that his death would "leave a big hole in the comedy world". Fincham's comments were echoed by BBC Two controller Roly Keating, who stated that "Harry was a truly independent spirit and one of the funniest people I've ever known". His literary agent Bill Hamilton told BBC News that Thompson had been "plainly a genius".

In a 2005 episode of Have I Got News For You, featuring Alexander Armstrong as host and Fi Glover and Ian McMillan as guest panellists, a message stating "In Memory of Harry Thompson, the first producer of Have I Got News For You (1960–2005)" was displayed.

== Bibliography ==
=== Books ===
Title	Year	Publisher	ISBN
The Man in the Iron Mask: An Historical Detective Investigation	1987	Weidenfeld & Nicolson	29779051X
Tintin: Hergé and his Creation	1991	Hodder & Stoughton (London)	978-0-340-52393-3
Richard Ingrams: Lord of the Gnomes	1994	William Heinemann Ltd	978-0434778287
Peter Cook: A Biography	1997	Hodder & Stoughton (London)	978-0340649688
This Thing of Darkness	2005	Headline Review	978-0755302802
Penguins Stopped Play: Eleven Village Cricketers Take on the World	2006	John Murray (London)	978-0719563454
