= Spring Day (comedian) =

American comedian, writer and actress

- Born: Kansas City, Missouri
- Occupations: Comedian, writer and actress
- Years active: 2002–present
- Website: http://springdaycomedy.com/

Spring Day is an American comedian, writer and actress. She performed around the world, including clubs based in London, Manchester, Dublin, Los Angeles, New York and Paris. She was voted Brooklyn's Best Comedian in 2016.

== Early life ==
Day was born and grew up in Kansas City, Missouri, in a house containing 20 dogs, five rats, three cats, two birds and a ferret. From the age of 13, Day knew she wanted to live in Japan and would later study there as an exchange student.

== Career ==
After being fired on her first day from a teaching job in central Japan, Day moved to Tokyo and took up comedy after seeing an advert in an English language magazine.

Day learned her craft in the Japanese comedy scene, headlining at the Tokyo Comedy Store in 2002. In 2004, she opened for Japanese comedian Zenjiro at the Melbourne Comedy Festival.

She was featured in the 2008 documentary The Tokyo Comedy Store.

She has appeared in the 2014 book The Humour Code and the 2017 book Joker Face alongside Jimmy Carr, Sara Pascoe, Russell Howard and Katherine Ryan.

In 2020, Day performed alongside fellow Americans Hopwood Depree and Will Franken in a Yank in the UK stand-up gig at the Leicester Comedy Festival. Day also appeared on the You'll Do podcast with Sarah Keyworth and Catherine Bohart, alongside Tim Renkow.

Since 2010, she has written, directed and performed five solo shows at the Edinburgh Fringe. She had also intended to take her show Spring Day: Dark Comedy for Nice People to the 2020 fringe until its cancellation due to the COVID-19 pandemic.

In February 2023, Day appeared in episode 7 of series 17 of Live at the Apollo on BBC One.

== Personal life ==
Day has mild cerebral palsy. She is married to fellow comedian Tim Renkow.
