= Tomorrow La Scala! =

2002 film

- Directed by: Francesca Joseph
- Written by: Francesca Joseph; Paul Abbott
- Produced by: Ruth Caleb
- Starring: Jessica Hynes
- Cinematography: Gerry Floyd
- Edited by: St. John O'Rorke
- Release date: May 2002
- Running time: 108 minutes
- Country: United Kingdom
- Language: English

Tomorrow La Scala! is a 2002 British comedy film directed by Francesca Joseph and starring Jessica Hynes. It was screened in the Un Certain Regard section at the 2002 Cannes Film Festival. It was nominated for the BAFTA TV Award for Best Single Drama in 2003.

== Plot ==
An opera company puts on a production of Stephen Sondheim's Sweeney Todd in a prison.

== Cast ==
- Jessica Hynes as Victoria (as Jessica Stevenson)
- Samantha Spiro as Jayney (Mrs. Lovett)
- Shaun Dingwall as Kevin
- Kulvinder Ghir as Rajiv
- Karl Johnson as Sydney
- Dudley Sutton as Dennis
- Mel Raido as Jordan
- Daniel Evans as Jonny Atkins
- Ian Burfield as Walter
- Lucy Bates as Lily (Joanna)
- Bruce Byron as Thomas
- Kevin Dignam as Mikey
- Helene Kvale as The Journalist
- Brenda Longman as Julia (Beggar Woman)
- Phelim McDermott as Cliff
- David Oyelowo as Charlie
- Steven Page as Miles (Sweeney Todd)
- Richard Van Allan as Eugene (The Judge)
- Byron Watson as Dick (Anthony)
