= A Young Doctor's Notebook =

Short story cycle by Mikhail Bulgakov

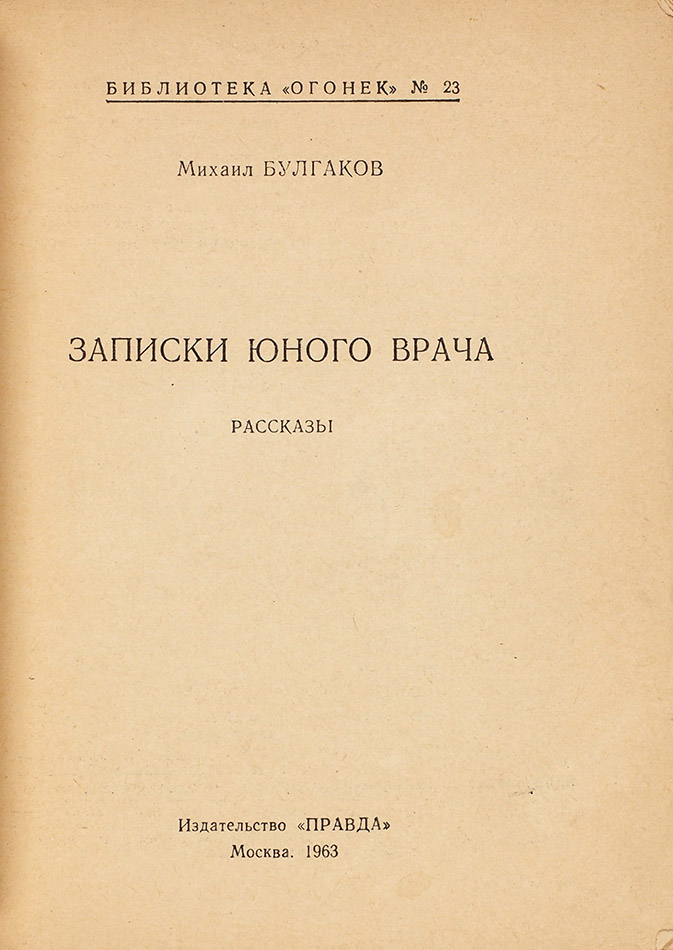
- Title page of the first edition
- Author: Mikhail Bulgakov
- Original title: Записки юного врача (Zapiski yunogo vracha)
- Translators: Michael Glenny (1975); Hugh Aplin (2011)
- Publication date: 1925–1927
- ISBN: 0002621037
- OCLC: 1531199
- Original text: Записки юного врача (Zapiski yunogo vracha) at Russian Wikisource

A Young Doctor's Notebook (Russian: «Записки юного врача» Zapiski yunogo vracha, literally, "A Young Doctor's Notes"), also known as A Country Doctor's Notebook, is a short story cycle by the Russian writer Mikhail Bulgakov. The stories, written in 1925–1926, are inspired by Bulgakov's experiences as a newly graduated young doctor in 1916–18, practicing in a small village hospital in Smolensk Governorate in revolutionary Russia. The stories initially appeared in Russian medical journals of the period and were later compiled by scholars into book form.

The first English translation was done by Michael Glenny and was published by Harvill Press in 1975. A more recent translation (2011) has been done by Hugh Aplin under the Oneworld Classics imprint. The title of the Aplin translation is A Young Doctor's Notebook.

== Stories ==
- "The Towel with a Cockerel Motif" (Russian: Полотенце с петухом, romanized: Polotentse s petukhom, translated by Michael Glenny as "The Embroidered Towel")
- "Baptism by Version" (Russian: Крещение поворотом, romanized: Kreshcheniye povorotom, translated by Michael Glenny as "Baptism by Rotation")
- "The Steel Throat" (Russian: Стальное горло, romanized: Stal'noye gorlo, translated by Michael Glenny as "The Steel Windpipe")
- "The Blizzard" (Russian: Вьюга, romanized: Vyuga)
- "Egyptian Darkness" (Russian: Тьма египетская, romanized: T'ma yegipetskaya, translated by Michael Glenny as "Black as Egypt's Night")
- "The Missing Eye" (Russian: Пропавший глаз, romanized: Propavshiy glaz, translated by Michael Glenny as "The Vanishing Eye")
- "The Star Rash" (Russian: Звёздная сыпь, romanized: Zvyozdnaya syp', translated by Michael Glenny as "The Speckled Rash" and by Hugh Aplin as "The Starry Rash")

The Michael Glenny translation includes the short stories "The Murderer" (1926) and "Morphine" (1927) which are not included in the original cycle. The Hugh Aplin translation also includes "Morphine" but does not include "The Murderer".

== Adaptations ==
- In 2008, a Russian film adaptation, titled Morphine, was released.
- In 2012, the book was turned into a British television miniseries with the same title and broadcast by Sky Arts as a part of the anthology series strand, Playhouse Presents. The role of the narrator/doctor is played by Jon Hamm and Daniel Radcliffe, both fans of Bulgakov's works. The show also features Adam Godley (as the feldsher Demyan Lukich), Vicki Pepperdine, Rosie Cavaliero, and Paul Popplewell.
