= Mark Chappell =

British sitcom writer and screenwriter

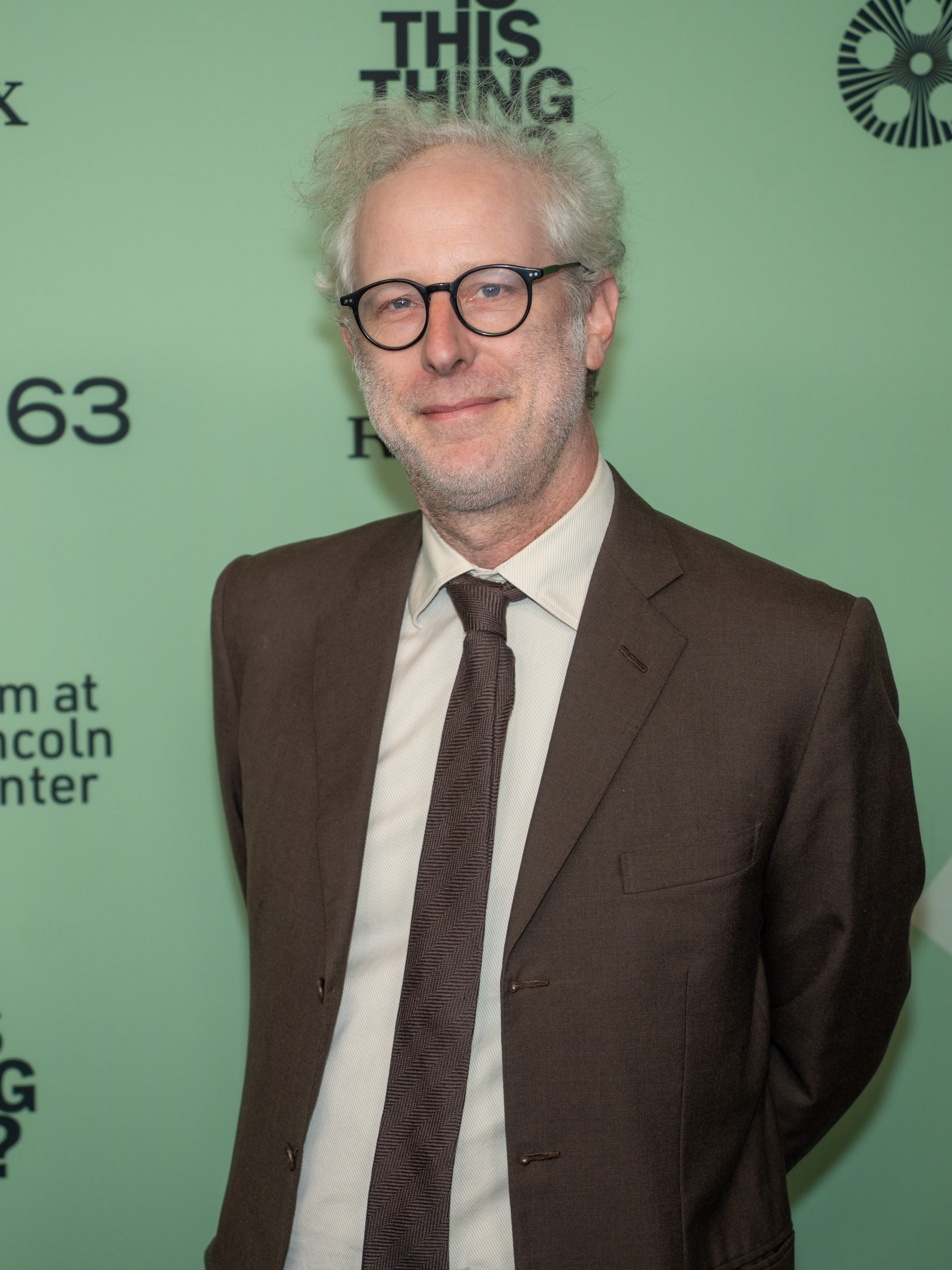
Mark Chappell at the 2025 New York Film Festival for Is This Thing On?

Mark Chappell is a British sitcom writer and screenwriter.

== Early life ==
Chappell is from Gloucestershire.

== Career ==
Chappell's credits include My Life in Film (for BBC Three), Tony Blair, Rock Star (for Channel 4 Television/V Good Films), Perfect Day, The Millennium (for Five/World Productions), The Increasingly Poor Decisions of Todd Margaret, Flaked, and the fourth series of Cold Feet (for Granada). He wrote the 2022 movie See How They Run, and co-wrote the movie Is This Thing On? with Bradley Cooper and Will Arnett.
