= Emily Yates =

British journalist and TV presenter

- Born: 1991 (age 34–35); Skipton, North Yorkshire, England
- Occupations: Journalist, television presenter

Emily Yates (born 1991) is an English journalist and television presenter for BBC Three. She has been voted one of the most influential disabled people in the UK.

Her first documentary, Meet The Devotees, was screened in March 2016. She is an access consultant, Lonely Planet travel writer, motivational speaker and disability advocate.

Yates and her twin sister were born 10 weeks prematurely and later diagnosed with cerebral palsy. Yates is now a full-time wheelchair user.

Yates is studying for a master's degree in Disability Studies from the University of Leeds, after graduating from Queen Mary, University of London with an undergraduate degree in English Literature. She was part of the BBC Generation 2015, a project that puts young adults at the heart of BBC programmes and content.

In 2012 Yates worked on the London Paralympics as a Games Maker where Lord Sebastian Coe quoted her phrase 'lifted the cloud of limitation' in his closing ceremony speech. She also volunteered at the 2014 Glasgow Commonwealth Games. She wrote an accessible guide to Rio for the 2016 Summer Paralympics.
