= Tim Renkow =

American actor, writer and comedian (born 1989)

- Born: 1989 (age 36–37); Mexico City, Mexico
- Education: art school
- Occupations: Actor, comedian, writer
- Years active: 2010 – present

Tim Renkow (born 1989) is an American actor, writer and comedian.

He is best known for playing the leading role of Tim in the British black comedy television series Jerk (2019–2023), which he also co-wrote. In 2022, Renkow received a nomination for the British Academy Television Award for Best Male Comedy Performance.

== Early life ==
Renkow was born in Mexico City, and grew up in Chapel Hill, North Carolina. He later attended art school in Memphis, Tennessee.

== Career ==
=== Pre-2019 ===
In Memphis, at age nineteen, Renkow began performing stand-up comedy. He continued in this activity in New York City, before moving to the United Kingdom to study creative writing in 2012.

He participated in the Chortle Student Comedy Award Final at 2013's Edinburgh Festival Fringe.

In 2014, Renkow performed his debut show, At Least Hell Has Ramps, and was nominated for Chortle's Best Newcomer Award.

Renkow's first television appearance was in 2016, in an episode of the BBC Three sketch show Comedy Feeds, "A Brief History of Tim".

In 2017, Renkow appeared in four episodes of Bobby & Harriet Get Married, Bobby Mair and Harriet Kemsley's comedic television series about their wedding.

=== Since 2019 ===
In February 2019, Series 1 of Renkow's comedy television series, Jerk, was released by BBC Three. It was subsequently replayed on BBC One, and its approval for a second series was announced in September 2019. The series is largely built on the characters established in A Brief History of Tim. The show's second series aired in 2021.

In April 2019, Renkow performed a one-man show at London's Soho Theatre entitled Tim Renkow Tries to Punch Down.

In 2021, Renkow was announced as a member of the U.K. jury for the British Academy of Film and Television Arts's BAFTA Breakthrough Initiative.

Renkow appears in two episodes of BBC's Live at the Apollo, in series 16 and as host in series 19.

== Personal life ==
Renkow has cerebral palsy.

In September 2020, he married fellow comedian Spring Day.

== Filmography ==
=== Television ===
Year	Title	Role	Notes
2016	BBC Comedy Feeds episode "A Brief History of Tim"	Tim	television movie
2017	Bobby & Harriet Get Married	Tim	4 episodes
2019–2023	Jerk	Tim	television series
2021–2025	Live at the Apollo	himself	2 episodes
