= Spring Festival =

Spring Festival may refer to:

- Chinese New Year, as it is referred to in China
- The Spring Festival, a 1991 Chinese film
- Spring Day, a holiday observed in several countries
- Spring festival, a seasonal festival

== See also ==
- Spring Festival Suite
- Springfest (disambiguation)
