= Monkey Dust =

British comedy sketch show

- Monkey Dust DVD cover
- Genre: Black comedy
- Created by: Harry Thompson; Shaun Pye
- Creative director: Mic Graves
- Starring: Simon Greenall; Sharon Horgan; Morwenna Banks; Rebecca Front; Frances Barber; Enn Reitel; Kate Robbins; Shaun Pye
- Country of origin: United Kingdom
- Original language: English
- No. of series: 3
- No. of episodes: 18

Production
- Running time: 29 minutes
- Production companies: Talkback; Baby Cow Productions

Original release
- Network: BBC Three
- Release: 9 February 2003 – 8 February 2005

Monkey Dust is a British adult animated satirical sketch comedy series created by Harry Thompson and Shaun Pye. The series is characterised by its dark humour, frequent shifts in animation styles, and handling of taboo topics such as bestiality, murder, suicide and paedophilia. Three series were broadcast on BBC Three between 2003 and 2005. Following co-creator Thompson's death, no further series were made.

== Episodes ==
Each episode featured animation by several different companies including Slinky Pictures, Nexus Productions, Sherbet Animation, Caroline Mabey, Picasso Pictures, and VooDooDog, but is linked by recurring themes/jokes and seamless transitions between sketches. The episodes are untitled but instead are known by the characters introduced or the one-off sketches included. The principal writers and creators of the series were Harry Thompson and Shaun Pye, although other contributors were responsible for a significant proportion of the work; sometimes collaborating with Thompson and/or Pye; sometimes contributing fully formed sketches to the show.

A short overview of the main characters, called a nocturne, set in the various characters' bedrooms with no dialogue and a depressing accompanying song, usually precedes the final section.

== Music ==
The animation in each episode is accompanied by contemporary music which helps the transition between scenes. Numerous songs by Goldfrapp, Boards of Canada and Black Box Recorder feature. The theme music for all three series is by Eels ("That's Not Really Funny" from Souljacker).

The inclusion of music from Goldfrapp during the first series would have pre-dated the commercial release of their debut album, but production on the series took so long that by the time of airing, Goldfrapp were about to release their second album. Thompson and Pye comment on this in the Series 1 DVD commentary.

== Release ==
On 8 November 2004, the first series of Monkey Dust was released in the UK on DVD. Several musical substitutions had to be made from the television airing, as artists such as Cliff Richard and David Gray would not allow their work to be used on the DVD. Cover versions of the original songs were used instead.

The second and third series were broadcast on BBC Two and BBC Three respectively. Only the first series of Monkey Dust was commercially released on DVD; however, in September 2009 eight episodes from across series 2 and 3 (along with four episodes from the already released series 1) were made available for download from iTunes, though these are no longer available. Another reason for the lack of DVD releases of the later series is thought to be the 'teenage jihadi' sketches being considered unsuitable in the wake of the 7 July 2005 London bombings that occurred a few months later.

== Reception ==
In 2003, The Observer listed Harry Thompson as one of the 50 funniest or most influential people in British comedy, citing Monkey Dust as evidence and calling it: "the most subversive show on television. The topical animated series is dark and unafraid to tackle taboo subjects such as paedophilia, taking us to Cruel Britannia, a creepy place where the public are hoodwinked by arrogant politicians and celebrities. This edgy show doesn't always work, but when it does there is nothing quite like it". It has received positive reviews from Vice and Digital Spy.

== Awards ==
- 2003: International Student Jury Award (Banff Rockies Awards)
- 2004: Best Multichannel Programme (Broadcast Awards)
- 2004: Best Comedy (British Animation Awards)
