= Alan Connor =

British writer, journalist and television presenter

Connor's voice
recorded August 2014

Alan Connor (born 1972) is a British writer, journalist and television presenter. First seen on Channel 4's youth entertainment programme The Word in 1995, he later appeared on The Big Breakfast and BBC Radio 5 Live and was a BBC News correspondent, appearing on BBC News 24 and The Daily Politics.

His scriptwriting credits include the comedy-drama A Young Doctor's Notebook, starring Daniel Radcliffe and Jon Hamm, the mockumentary Nigel Farage Gets His Life Back and the BBC film The Rack Pack. He created a series of themed puzzles in The Guardian for Ludwig (2024).

Connor has worked as a writer for programmes including Charlie Brooker's Weekly Wipe, The Jonathan Ross Show and This Week and writes journalism for BBC News and The Guardian. He was the question editor for BBC Four's lateral thinking quiz Only Connect for series 9–12, having taken over from David J. Bodycombe at the start of series 9. He is also the crossword editor for The Guardian and sets the Everyman cryptic crossword for The Observer.

== Books ==
In 2013, Penguin published Two Girls, One on Each Knee: A History of Cryptic Crosswords. In 2014 Gotham Books published The Crossword Century: 100 Years of Witty Wordplay, Ingenious Puzzles, and Linguistic Mischief. In 2016 Penguin Books published The Joy of Quiz. In November 2024 BBC Books published 188 Words for Rain.
