= List of The IT Crowd episodes =

The IT Crowd is a Channel 4 British sitcom set in London. It was written and directed by Graham Linehan. It stars Richard Ayoade, Chris O'Dowd and Katherine Parkinson as the information technology staff of an office.

== Series overview ==
Series	Episodes	Originally released	
Series	Episodes	First released	Last released
1	6	3 February 2006	3 March 2006
2	6	24 August 2007	28 September 2007
3	6	21 November 2008	26 December 2008
4	6	25 June 2010	30 July 2010
Special		27 September 2013	

== Episodes ==
=== Series 1 (2006) ===
No. overall	No. in series	Title	Directed by	Written by	Original release date
1	1	"Yesterday's Jam"	Graham Linehan	Graham Linehan	3 February 2006
Jen Barber (Katherine Parkinson) is interviewed for a position at Reynholm Industries. Based on the false claim on her CV that she "has a lot of experience with computers", Denholm Reynholm (Chris Morris) places her in charge of the IT department. She discovers to her dismay that her office is in the basement with "standard nerds" Roy (Chris O'Dowd) and Moss (Richard Ayoade). The two, each believing that they were the head of department, are resistant to her leadership, which is affirmed when they discover she knows very little about computers. However, Denholm's adversity to non-teamwork forces the trio to get along. Jen hosts a party in the IT office to boost the department's popularity, but she and the guests react badly when Moss tells them about an encounter he and Roy had with two prostitutes in Amsterdam.
2	2	"Calamity Jen"	Graham Linehan	Graham Linehan	3 February 2006
Denholm mandates his employees to attend a stress seminar, declaring "war on stress" and threatening to fire those who are still stressed by the end of the day. Roy, who has annoyed the seminar's instructor, later steals his stress-measuring machine. Moss tries to make his own version, but when he leaves a soldering iron switched on, he starts a fire in the office. Jen buys and wears a pair of red high heels that are far too small, mangling her toes. She goes on a foul-mouthed tirade at a Japanese man after he accidentally stamps on her foot, unaware that he is a visiting executive who was planning to do business with Denholm.
3	3	"Fifty-Fifty"	Graham Linehan	Graham Linehan	10 February 2006
Roy's date with a young woman goes horribly wrong after she mistakes chocolate spread on his head for faeces, despite Roy's insistence that it is not. Roy declares that she did not like him because women only like "bastards" and devises a plan to prove his theory by posting a singles ad which makes him sound despicable. After receiving a single response, Roy arranges a date with an attractive young woman and sets out to act like a "bastard" to progress to a relationship. Jen impresses a company security guard by correctly guessing obscure facts from multiple choice questions; she is later selected as his "phone a friend" on the ITV quiz show Who Wants to Be a Millionaire?. The security guard asks her out, following which Jen is unable to answer the quiz question correctly. Roy and Jen take their dates to the same restaurant, a family Tex-Mex restaurant called Messy Joe's, on Moss's recommendation. Following a scene in which a restaurant entertainer is assaulted by Jen's date after mocking him for failing on Millionaire, Roy and Jen's dates leave together.
4	4	"The Red Door"	Graham Linehan	Graham Linehan	17 February 2006
Frustrated at the repeated theft of his coffee mug, Moss shows off a plain white one which supposedly has a picture of his face on the bottom; however, he is unable to find it. After heading upstairs to resolve an IT problem, Roy finds himself trapped underneath the desks of two female employees. As Roy phones Moss for help to escape, Jen investigates what is behind a strange red door in the department that Roy and Moss have forbidden her to open. Inside, she discovers Richmond (Noel Fielding), a lonely goth whose job is to watch over some "blinky lights on a machine". Richmond shares the story of how he was Denholm's right-hand man until the death of Denholm's father and (coincidentally) Richmond's discovery of the extreme metal band Cradle of Filth. After gifting one of their albums to Denholm's mother, he was demoted to the basement. Touched by his story, Jen sets out to try to restore Richmond to his former glory. While initially successful with returning Richmond to his former position, Denholm completely changes his mind on a whim and sends Richmond back down to the basement.
5	5	"The Haunting of Bill Crouse"	Graham Linehan	Graham Linehan	24 February 2006
Jen has a terrible dinner date with co-worker Bill Crouse (Adam Buxton), during which he is rude to their waiter, refuses to share food (despite being at a tapas restaurant) and speaks with an annoying rising inflection. Jen wants to avoid his asking for a follow-up date, so she tells Moss to lie and say that she is too busy. However, when Bill arrives and is about to uncover Moss's lie, Moss panickedly tells Bill that Jen has died. Things escalate when Bill spreads his false claim that he was the last person to sleep with Jen, while Moss lies to Jen that the flowers and sympathy card are because she was made Employee of the Month. Upon realising the truth, Jen threatens Moss, who tells her that she should go after Bill instead. Throughout the rest of the day Bill believes he being haunted by Jen due to a number of coincidences, such as Jen's disembodied head appearing to float outside his office, Jen calling him with a raspy voice telling him to stop lying, and Jen showing up at his house in the rain. Roy offers to do work for an attractive young woman called Julie from the fifth floor (a place Roy calls "The Land of the Beautiful People"), but confuses her with the monstrous Judy, so Julie tells Roy it is Judy who needs his help. Later when Judy shows up to the basement, Moss lies to her telling her that Roy is dead, and, while initially distraught, she leaves contently.
6	6	"Aunt Irma Visits"	Graham Linehan	Graham Linehan	3 March 2006
Following a meeting in which Denholm thanks everyone except the IT department for their involvement in a successful project, Jen becomes exceptionally moody and irritable. When Moss and Roy ask about it, Jen replies that it is a visit from her "Aunt Irma", a euphemism for premenstrual syndrome. Moss has been having therapy sessions with attractive company psychiatrist (Frances Barber) (who coincidentally looks exactly like Roy's mother), but when the latter wants to halt the sessions, Moss becomes angry and starts swearing. After being personally thanked by Denholm for his work, Roy experiences strong emotional feelings. Later when Moss' psychiatrist shows up in the basement, she reveals that she ended her sessions with Moss so that she may become romantically involved with him. Jen reasons that the recent mood changes must be "Aunt Irma", but Moss mistakenly shares this insight to the IT community and it goes viral, turning them into internet celebrities and inciting "Aunt Irma riots" throughout the world. To settle their emotions, Jen, Moss and Roy watch Steel Magnolias, then have a "girls' night out". They then go to the company's celebration party where they all become drunk and wake up with unexpected lovers the next morning.

=== Series 2 (2007) ===
No. overall	No. in series	Title	Directed by	Written by	Original release date	Viewers (millions)
7	1	"The Work Outing"	Graham Linehan	Graham Linehan	24 August 2007	2.53
Co-worker Phillip asks Jen on a date to watch a play. Doubting Phillip's sexual orientation, Moss and Roy invite themselves along; their suspicions are reinforced when the play turns out be a 1980s-set musical which has strong homosexual themes titled Gay!: A Gay Musical. During the intermission, Moss and Roy are unable to urinate in the gents' toilet due to the distracting presence of a washroom attendant, so they use the staff and disabled facilities respectively. Roy mistakes the emergency cord for a flush; when the staff arrive to assist, he pretends to be disabled in order to avoid condemnation for using the disabled toilet; however, he is mistakenly grouped with wheelchair-using attendees from Manchester and brought backstage for a meet and greet. Moss has meanwhile become the theatre's bartender, having been mistaken for a member of staff. Jen eventually confronts Phillip about his sexuality, and he admits that he is, indeed, gay and hoped that their relationship could work because Jen "looked a bit like a man".
8	2	"Return of the Golden Child"	Graham Linehan	Graham Linehan	31 August 2007	3.42
Asking Roy questions about his lifestyle, Moss enters Roy's data into an internet site that estimates a person's date of death; it says Roy will die the following Thursday at 3pm. Denholm, upon receiving a visit from police who want to investigate "financial irregularities" in the pension accounts, casually opens a window and jumps out of it to his death. Denholm's successor Derek dislikes the IT department and plans to fire them. During the funeral, Roy notices it is almost his "death time" and reacts violently when his pimped-up phone goes off at 3pm. Jen, who has not smoked in three years, begins smoking again after watching Denholm's pre-recorded message. Denholm's son Douglas (Matt Berry) storms the funeral where it is announced he will be taking over Reynholm Industries, so long as he avoids endangering the company's reputation with sexual harassment cases. Douglas fires Derek and immediately falls for Jen.
9	3	"Moss and the German"	Graham Linehan	Graham Linehan	7 September 2007	1.99
Roy and Moss try to watch a zombie film on DVD when Roy's friend calls him and is about to spoil the movie's plot twist. When they realise they have been spending a lot of time together like an old married couple, Jen suggests they try new activities to make new friends. Moss enrols in a German cookery course, only to find that his instructor, Johan, is a cannibal who made some translation errors in the advert. Douglas invites Roy to watch the DVD but when Douglas learns it has a plot twist, he tries to guess it, annoying Roy. Roy volunteers to be the German cannibal's next meal so that he can watch the film on the latter's impressive home entertainment system. However, they are raided by the police who are concerned that the video was pirated. Jen struggles with the company's increasingly harsh treatment of smokers, presented humorously as Soviet-style authoritarianism.
10	4	"The Dinner Party"	Graham Linehan	Graham Linehan	14 September 2007	1.81
Jen has finally found love with her new boyfriend Peter, and to celebrate their happiness they host a dinner party for six of their single friends: three men and three women. When Peter suddenly announces that the men are unable to attend, she reluctantly invites Roy, Moss and Richmond to take their places. Jen briefs her colleagues on how to act normally. Roy sits with a model, Paula, who was injured by a car crash and had to undergo extensive surgery on her face, which has a lot of bandaging on it. Moss pairs up with Margaret, who is very flirtatious when drunk. Richmond unexpectedly hits it off with Jessica and the pair have sex in another room. During the dinner party, Roy and Moss discover that Jen's boyfriend's name is Peter File, which sounds similar to "paedophile" and causes much confusion and discomfort. At the end of the night, all of the attendees pair off and leave together. Roy discovers that Paula is a gamer like himself and tries to ask her out on a date only to be rejected. Jen and Peter set off for a romantic holiday to Paris, but she abandons him at the airport when his name is announced on the airport's public address system.
11	5	"Smoke and Mirrors"	Graham Linehan	Graham Linehan	21 September 2007	N/A (<1.65)
Roy comes back from a stag night unaware that he has been wearing lipstick. Jen loses concentration during an important meeting after wearing a "bad bra" to work, but when Moss invents a bra that does not lose its comfort or form (the "A-bra-cada-bra"), Jen is able to have an effective meeting. Moss gets an opportunity to pitch it to Dragons' Den. Things go sour when the bra has overheating issues, ruining another meeting for Jen, and when Moss cannot remember his pseudonym and answers to the wrong name, he ends up being erroneously interviewed on Newsnight about the Iraq War. Roy and Jen try to help Moss with the pitch in exchange for a cut of the profits, but it goes horribly wrong when Jen ends up repeating phrases, and the bra catches fire. Douglas discovers the band The Ordinary Boys and attends one of their gigs.
12	6	"Men Without Women"	Graham Linehan	Graham Linehan	28 September 2007	N/A (<1.56)
Douglas travels far and wide in his quest to bed Jen and is given Rohypnol by a mysterious blind sorcerer. Douglas offers Jen a position as his personal assistant. Having realised she is wasting her life in her current position, she accepts. Moss and Roy engage in a list of activities that they would not be able to do with Jen around, such as not wearing trousers, jousting with bicycles and broomsticks, and Roy trying to hit a golf ball into Moss's mouth. When Douglas tries to make sexual advances on Jen, he is refused, and resorts to putting the Rohypnol in a drink. Roy and Moss rescue Jen, but when Jen realises she was replaced by an answering machine, she leaves Roy and Moss trapped in the room with Douglas, who has drunk the Rohypnol and has become inexplicably aroused.

=== Series 3 (2008) ===
No. Overall	No. in Series	Title	Directed by	Written by	Original air date
13	1	"From Hell"	Graham Linehan	Graham Linehan	21 November 2008
Roy suspects Jen's handyman Gary is a "builder from hell" who has a reputation of urinating in customers' sinks. Jen spends a day at home to observe Gary, causing the latter to think she must be flirting with him, and prompting Jen and Roy to install closed-circuit cameras. Douglas is instructed to do nothing, as he has an important meeting with Japanese business investors. After finding his grandfather's service revolver, he accidentally shoots himself in the leg before the meeting. When Jen finally spots Gary, who is disgruntled after Jen called him "a big, ugly builder", urinating in her bathtub, she botches her attempt to record the incident and accidentally sends the footage to a monitor at the investor conference. Later at the hospital, Roy attempts to steal a £20 note from Douglas as retribution for the other £20 note owned by Roy which Douglas threw out of a window. Moss has been regularly harassed by a group of teenagers on the way to work, prompting Roy to teach him by role play how to stand up to them. Unable to deter his bullies, Moss chases them off with Douglas's gun instead.
14	2	"Are We Not Men?"	Graham Linehan	Graham Linehan	28 November 2008
Moss and Roy use a football translation website called Bluffball (Note: Going to the website "bluffball.co.uk" used to take the user to a message where it was announced the site is coming soon. It then took the user to an unowned website domain, and now refers them to a page indicating that the domain has been sold.) to gather quotes to pass themselves off as knowledgeable football fans in order to make new friends and get free drinks. They are invited to an actual game, and Roy is invited to a poker night, but when Roy finds himself in debt to one of his new acquaintances, he offers to do them a favour by driving them to their event. However, he is shocked to discover that the event is a bank robbery. Moss and Roy escape the police by pretending to be gay. Jen has trouble dating a man after Roy remarks that he looks like a stage magician.
15	3	"Tramps Like Us"	Graham Linehan	Graham Linehan	5 December 2008
Following the events of the series 2 episode finale, Jen, Moss and Roy receive a disappointing settlement from their sexual harassment lawsuit. Moss suffers a concussion from running into a door, and forgets everything he knows about computers. Jen pursues a new job, but finds herself tongue-tied when asked what IT stands for. Roy, who had his T-shirt dirtied and his jacket given away to help an elderly co-worker, is chased around the office by security and kicked out for being shirtless and without his door pass. He is forced to wander the streets begging for money. Douglas, who was forced by the settlement to wear "electric sex pants" – underpants that shock him whenever he becomes aroused – cannot perform even simple functions without getting zapped, so he gets Moss to disarm it.
16	4	"The Speech"	Graham Linehan	Graham Linehan	12 December 2008
Jen boasts about winning Employee of the Month and makes Roy and Moss write her acceptance speech. Seeing an opportunity to humiliate her, Roy and Moss trick Jen by lending her "the internet" in the form of a small black box with a blinking light. They explain that if anything were to befall it, there would be worldwide chaos. Douglas finds the love of his life in a journalist named April, but mishears that she used to be a man, thinking she said that she is from Iran. At the shareholders meeting, Moss and Roy find their prank has backfired when the shareholders hang on Jen's every word about the internet. After learning the truth about April, Douglas breaks up with her, but their ensuing fist fight disrupts the shareholder meeting, crushing "the internet", and causing panic. Later, Douglas, alone at home, regrets breaking up with April. Channel 4 removed the episode from its streaming service on 5 October 2020 "in light of current audience expectations, not as a result of recent media coverage or any personal views expressed by the writer, Graham Linehan."
17	5	"Friendface"	Graham Linehan	Graham Linehan	19 December 2008
Jen persuades Roy and Moss to join the social networking site Friendface. (Note: Friendface is a portmanteau of the social network sites Friendster and Facebook. Going to the website "friendface.co.uk" used to take the user to a notice from Reynholm Industries saying the site has been blocked.) After reuniting with a successful classmate and making tall tales about her own progress, Jen attends her secondary school reunion, at which she asks Roy and then Moss to pretend to be her husband. But Roy has to meet up with an old date who was known to wear so much makeup that when she cries she resembles the Joker. At the reunion, Moss brags about Jen, but Roy and his date crash the party where Roy and Moss then argue over who really loves Jen.
18	6	"Calendar Geeks"	Graham Linehan	Graham Linehan	26 December 2008
Roy is overjoyed when the women from the seventh floor decide to make a nude calendar as a fundraiser for one of the women's debilitatingly "boss-eyed" brother, and Roy is asked be the photographer. Jen, who is offended by the idea, complains and persuades the women to do a calendar of their grandmothers instead. But when Douglas makes Jen personally responsible for making at least £1 million from the calendar, she and Roy decide to employ friends of Roy and Moss, leading to a "geek chic" concept. The calendar is an absolute failure.

=== Series 4 (2010) ===
Series 4 was recorded at Pinewood Studios in the spring of 2010.

No. overall	No. in series	Title	Directed by	Written by	Original release date	Viewers (millions)
19	1	"Jen the Fredo"	Graham Linehan	Graham Linehan	25 June 2010	2.22
Roy is depressed over his recent breakup with his girlfriend, leading him to Photoshopping her out of pictures taken of the two of them. Jen applies to be the company's Entertainment Manager, despite the fact that the position was originally held by a man who acted as a pimp and took clients to seedy places. Roy likens Jen's job to that of Fredo from The Godfather. Douglas tries to have a feminist committee take back the "Shithead of the Year" award they gave him, later learning that it was given to him after Jen informed the committee of his sexist behaviour. Following a disappointing visit with the clients to see The Vagina Monologues, Jen turns to Moss and Roy for ideas. Moss, who has been devising his own Dungeons & Dragons-styled role-playing game, invites Jen's clients and Roy for a session - which the clients dislike at first but like by the end. After Roy tells Jen that Fredo was ultimately killed, Douglas throws the award out of his window; it narrowly misses Jen, who is standing on the pavement below.
20	2	"The Final Countdown"	Graham Linehan	Graham Linehan	2 July 2010	2.22
Following a successful run on the popular quiz show Countdown, Moss is invited by a mysterious man named Prime (Benedict Wong) to "8+", an exclusive club for previous champions of the game show who have appeared over eight times. He is later challenged to "Street Countdown" by Negative One. Roy is visited by a window cleaner (Brian "Limmy" Limond) who leaves his stuff at Roy's flat. He later meets an old acquaintance who has become rather successful, but worries when he is seen in multiple circumstances as a window cleaner. Jen is suspicious of Douglas' secretive manager meetings where the attendants are wearing dressing gowns, and finds a way to get in, only to discover they have changed the meeting to an aerobics class.
21	3	"Something Happened"	Graham Linehan	Graham Linehan	9 July 2010	2.09
Douglas becomes interested in "Spaceology" – a new age-styled religion that employs cosmic ordering – and tries to persuade his employees to follow in his footsteps. Roy injures his back while moshing at a Sweet Billy Pilgrim concert event. When he sees a masseur for treatment, the masseur kisses him on the backside, and Roy takes him to court for sexual harassment. Jen, who has fallen in love with the band's geeky-looking keyboard player (who has a fixed stare), becomes a groupie and tries her luck as the band's singer. However, after he is kicked out due to Jen's awful performance, she no longer finds him attractive (confirming Roy's earlier comments about their relationship).
22	4	"Italian for Beginners"	Graham Linehan	Graham Linehan	16 July 2010	2.46
Jealous that her co-worker Linda has been impressing everyone at their executive meetings, Jen pretends to be fluent in Italian so she can become Douglas' interpreter for an upcoming meeting. Moss brags about realising he can put his mobile phone in his shirt pocket for easier convenience, only to have it fall into the toilet, and tries to get an iPhone that he sees in a claw crane machine. Roy discovers that his latest girlfriend (Nathalie Cox) has a traumatic past, but is befuddled when he learns the highly improbable details: her parents died in a fire at a sea lion show at Sea Parks. Moss helps Jen with a phone conference by installing voice-translation software on her laptop, but when the Italian businessman comes for a face-to-face visit, Jen is denied use of the laptop. Unable to actually speak Italian, Jen's attempts to translate for the meeting causes the businessman to become annoyed and storm out. After accidentally starting a fire using a model of a Sea Parks arena to figure out how his girlfriend's parents died, Roy is reluctant to explain how his hands got burnt. It is later revealed that Jen forgot to rescue Moss from the claw machine.
23	5	"Bad Boys"	Graham Linehan	Graham Linehan	23 July 2010	2.27
At a Scared Straight!-styled talk, Moss is the first to present, recalling the events of the episode. After Roy discovers that Jen's laptop is inundated with viruses, she bets that he cannot go one day without tell someone to turn their computer off and turning it on again. Following lunch at the park, Roy and Moss find their path back is blocked by a bomb threat. When they decide to "bunk off", Jen is disastrously left alone to represent the IT department. Roy and Moss loiter on a bus and at an entertainment shop. After Moss shoplifts some DVDs, the two are ejected by a security guard. On the way back they walk into danger when they encounter a bomb disposal robot outside the building. After initially trying to help fix the malfunctioning robot, which leads Roy to losing the bet, Moss is recognised by a shopkeeper from the mall and is arrested. Roy is paralysed with fear and is unable to move away from the robot.
24	6	"Reynholm vs Reynholm" "Douglas and Divorce"	Graham Linehan	Graham Linehan	30 July 2010	2.73
Douglas' second wife Victoria (Belinda Stewart-Wilson), who had disappeared after two weeks of marriage, reunites with Douglas. But after another two weeks and a divorce, she sues him for £212 million. Douglas attempts to represent himself in the trial, with Jen's assistance. Roy and Moss prove poor witnesses due to their prior traumatic legal experiences. Richmond returns as a surprise witness, having shed his goth image to start a business called Goth2Boss, but had mistakenly believed that Victoria was a former client and an identity thief. After Douglas unsuccessfully fakes a heart attack, Jen pleads for the court to overlook his pathetic behaviour and to consider the workers at Reynholm Industries who would lose their jobs. Victoria offers to settle for £70 million, to which Douglas hastily agrees. Douglas, Jen, Roy and Moss then celebrate at The Flabby Goose restaurant as credits roll.

=== Special (2013) ===
In October 2011, Graham Linehan stated that a one-off special would air to end the series. On 8 May 2013, it was confirmed by Channel 4 and the BBC that the special would begin shooting in a few weeks, and would air later in the year. Den of Geek's spoiler-free review revealed the title as "The Internet Is Coming", though the title of this episode has been incorrectly given as "The Last Byte" by some sources. The special had a running time of 48 minutes, which is twice the standard length of all the regular episodes.

No.	Title	Directed by	Written by	Original release date	Viewers (millions)
25	"The Internet Is Coming"	Graham Linehan	Graham Linehan	27 September 2013	2.23
Jen falls for a flirtatious coffee barista and recommends her colleagues to try the place, but when Roy goes, he gets a bad cup of coffee from a "small man" barista. After getting negative feedback from Jen concerning his Web show on board games, Moss is encouraged by Douglas to wear women's trousers to boost his confidence. Jen and Roy visit the coffee shop, but Roy's presence distracts Jen's barista and she is served bad coffee. Meanwhile, Roy places a complaint on a Post-It note at the counter the small barista is working and leaves with Jen. When she tosses the coffee aside, she splashes it on a homeless woman, while the short-statured barista confronts Roy and is then hit by a van with breasts, a promotion backed by Douglas. A video of Jen and Roy's behaviour soon goes viral and reveals their identity. Jen and Roy turn to Moss, who makes his pepper spray into a useful product, but it backfires during a demonstration. Elsewhere, Douglas participates in The Secret Millionaire and tries to relate with some youths, but goes on the run from the police after serving them alcohol. Before going into hiding in the IT department, he asks Jen, Roy, and Moss to take over the company until the statute of limitations run out. The end credits sequence shows how Reynholm Industries is revolutionised with the former IT trio in charge.
