= Total Film =

British film magazine

- Cover for the last issue (November 2024), featuring Gladiator II
- Editor: Jane Crowther
- Categories: Film
- Frequency: Monthly
- Total circulation: 21,048 per issue (Jan – Dec 2023)
- First issue: February 1997
- Final issue: October 2024
- Company: Future plc
- Country: United Kingdom
- Based in: Bath
- Language: English
- Website: www.gamesradar.com/totalfilm/
- ISSN: 1366-3135

Total Film was a British film magazine published 13 times a year (published monthly with a summer issue added, between the July and August issues, every year since issue 91, 2004) by Future Publishing. The magazine was launched in 1997 and offered cinema, DVD and Blu-ray news, reviews, and features. Total Film was available both in print and interactive iPad editions.

In 2014, it was announced online that Total Film would be merging into GamesRadar+, alongside SFX, Edge, and Computer and Video Games.

In October 2024, Future announced that the publication of Total Film would be ending on issue 356, with the publication joining All About Space, Total 911 and 3D World as titles axed by the company at the same time.

== Features ==
Each month, Total Film provided a range of features, from spotlight interviews with actors and directors to the making of on-set pieces for new and future releases. Each issue always included the "Total Film Interview", which was a six-page in-depth chat with an actor or director, along with a critique of their body of work.

== Key sections within the magazine ==
Dialogue
In this section, readers could interact with the magazine. It contained readers' letters, emails, and feedback from the magazine's social media followers (TF's Forum, Facebook, and Twitter). Each month, TF offered a DVD for each published missive. A regular feature within Dialogue included Office Spaced where snippets of conversation from the TF office are shared.

Buzz
The Total Film news section provided details on upcoming films, including first-look photos, on-set visits, and exclusive sneak peeks. Regular features included: "Ever Met Tom Cruise?" where a behind-the-scenes person is interviewed, e.g. a stuntwoman or a casting director; "You Talkin' To Me?" where stars would answer questions posed as famous film quotes and "Red Light, Green Light" for what is trending upwards in terms of interest and what is not in the film industry. Also included was the "60-Second Screenplay", which is a cut-down, humorous version of a movie script.

Agenda
Billed as being "for the sharper movie fan", this section often previewed more eclectic and less mainstream releases and players. Richard Ayoade from The IT Crowd wrote a column for this section.

Screen
The main cinema reviews section, with every new movie for that month reviewed and rated. Major releases received comprehensive coverage, with a star rating out of five, the magazine's own "Predicted Interest Curve" - a graph that demonstrated which moments of a film are likely to hold the viewer's attention and a short "Verdict". Also briefly listed were similar recommendations under "See this if you liked..." Smaller films received a concise review and rating. The end of the section was devoted to the current US and UK box office charts, an irreverent flashback to an old issue and summaries of any films that were not shown to journalists in time for that month's print deadline.

Lounge
TF's home entertainment guide, including reviews of the latest DVDs and Blu-rays, as well as some games, soundtracks and books. Regular features included "Is It Just Me?", where a TF writer got to rant about a particular (often controversial) film-related point of view, with readers then given the right to reply via the TF Forum or website; "Instant Expert" which gave a rundown of the key facts you need to know about an actor, director or movie genre; and "TF Loves", which picked out a certain scene or character rated by the magazine.

== Foreign editions ==
Licensed local editions of Total Film are released in many countries, including Turkey, Russia, Serbia, Croatia, Indonesia, plus many others.

== Online presence ==
Total Film's online presence includes the website, social networks and a mobile application. Sections on the website include news, reviews, features, trailers and video, films coming soon, competitions, screening club and magazine. The TF Forum existed between 2004 and 2013 before being shut down by the magazine. Total Film launched its iPhone app in August 2010, and an iPad app in 2012.

== See also ==
- List of film periodicals
