= Hello Friend =

- Directed by: Graham Linehan
- Written by: Graham Linehan; Robert Popper
- Produced by: Peter La Terriere; Kenton Allen
- Starring: Martin Savage; Julia Davis (voice only)
- Edited by: Chris Dickens
- Production companies: Film4 Productions; The Film Council; Shine Limited
- Release date: 2 February 2003
- Running time: 11 minutes
- Country: United Kingdom
- Language: English

Hello Friend, sometimes written as Hello, Friend, is a 2003 short comedy horror film directed by Graham Linehan and written by Linehan and Robert Popper. The film was Linehan's directorial debut. The film stars Martin Savage as a man, John Ward, but credited as the "Subject", who buys some new internet software for his computer, which begins to take over his life. The film was produced by The Film Council, Film4 Productions and Shine Limited.

== Plot ==
The Subject, aka John Ward, one day receives an email advertising a product called "Praemus", described as "The cheaper, faster and better way of using the internet." After the Subject buys a Praemus, he advises his friends to get it also. He receives in his package an extensive manual, and the Praemus connection unit, which easily attaches itself to the computer.

The Subject then sends an email complaining about problems with his Praemus. He complains that the unit claims he was online for 200 hours in a week, and other various problems with his computer, such as his monitor vibrating, blasts of static electricity and his screen shutting down, meaning he has to send his email from an internet cafe. The Subject gets an email back saying that this is the first time the Praemus system has done this, and that he should try turning the computer off and on again. However, unknown to him, there is no one working in the Praemus office.

The Subject responds by saying he does not know how to turn the system off. His friend, who normally helps him with his computer, is reluctant to get involved. Later, other problems begin to develop for the Subject, as his cat goes missing. Praemus send another complicated email explaining what to do. Whilst he reads the manual and email explaining it, his daughter begins to play with matches.

The Subject then responds again saying that he tried to remove the unit, but he got badly burned when he touched the glowing Praemus logo. He continues to complain that the company keeps sending him bills, despite the fact they are not helping him. The Subject then begins to have nightmares about the unit. Praemus then send an email saying that if he damages the unit, it will result in legal action. The Subject says that they were the ones who told him to interfere with the unit. He then goes on to say that there was some sort of "drinking sound" coming from the unit. Later, the unit tries to connect with his head and sell him Praemus Life Insurance.

In another email, the Subject writes that the other units are harming the friends to whom he recommended the Praemus service. Their hands also get burned and their units also start moving. However, The Subject buys the Praemus Life Insurance. His wife leaves a Dear John letter on the computer monitor, saying she is taking their daughter, and that he is not to try to find them. As his life deteriorates, he threatens in an email that he will begin "legal proceedings". However, as he types this, the computer freezes. In frustration, he hits the keyboard with his head, which opens a new window on his computer. The window is a dialog box displaying the setup options for Praemus. The options are not related to the computer, but to himself and aspects of his life. Options displayed include, "Friends", "Spouse", "Children", "Sanity", "Pets" and "Acumen", all marked "Off". As soon as he tries to change one of the options, the computer turns itself off, and he has a heart attack.

While the Subject is in the hospital, Praemus sends an email to the Subject's wife apologizing for the heart attack. The Subject's heartbeat then appears to stop, and the light on the unit fades away, but it turns out the heart monitor, also from Praemus, is not working. A doctor simply hits the machine and it begins to work, grumbling that he should write to the company as well. Back at home, the Praemus unit finally powers off and disconnects from the computer, and the Subject's cat returns. Finally, the Subject wakes up.

== Production ==
The film was based on an idea by Jonathan Bloom and Robert Popper, who also co-wrote the film with Graham Linehan. The film was produced by Linehan, Peter La Terriere and Kenton Allen. Comic actors David Walliams, Richard Ayoade, Martin Savage and Amelia Bullmore also star, with voice-overs by Peter Serafinowicz and Julia Davis.

No one is shown speaking in the film. Email text is presented as voice-over by Serafinowicz (as the original advertisement), Davis (as Praemus) and Savage (as the Subject) with Walliams as one of the subject's friends. Ayoade plays a computer consultant, presumably Maurice Moss (due to the fact the character wears the same clothing as Moss, notably the short sleeve shirt and tie and the big glasses) from Linehan's show The IT Crowd. Linehan makes a director's cameo as the doctor in the final scene although his face is not seen.

== Release ==
Hello Friend was released as an extra on the first series DVD of The IT Crowd, a television sitcom also directed and written by Linehan. Hello Friend has The IT Crowd's Richard Ayoade making a cameo as the Computer Man. The short has also been shown on Channel 4 several times.
