= List of The IT Crowd characters =

The following is a list of fictional characters from the British television sitcom The IT Crowd, which was broadcast by Channel 4 from 2006 to 2013.

== Overview ==
= Main cast (credited main cast member)
= Recurring cast (3+ appearances in a season)
= Guest cast (1–2 appearances per season)

Actor	Character	Series				Special
Actor	Character	1	2	3	4	Special
Main characters
Chris O'Dowd	Roy Trenneman	Main	Main	Main	Main	Main
Richard Ayoade	Maurice Moss	Main	Main	Main	Main	Main
Katherine Parkinson	Jen Barber	Main	Main	Main	Main	Main
Chris Morris	Denholm Reynholm	Main	Guest	Guest		
Matt Berry	Douglas Reynholm		Recurring	Main	Main	Main
Noel Fielding	Richmond Avenal	Recurring	Recurring		Guest	Main

== Main characters ==
From left to right: Jen, Moss and Roy.

=== Roy Trenneman ===
- Chris O'Dowd

Roy is a work-shy Irish IT technician and geek who spends much of his time playing video games or reading comics in the office. His work attire is casual compared to his colleagues; choosing to wear jeans and geek chic T-shirts. Prior to his IT job, he worked as a waiter; he said he would carry the food of rude customers in his trousers before serving it to them. When answering phone calls, he often uses the phrase "Have you tried turning it off and on again?", even using an automated recording of this phrase in "Fifty-Fifty". The series 4 episodes reveal Roy to have globophobia (fear of balloons) and being extremely uncomfortable when a masseur planted a kiss on his bottom. In the episode special "The Internet Is Coming", Roy says that his new girlfriend described him with the phrase "artistic spectrum" although it is later revealed she probably said "autistic spectrum".

Roy's last name was not given in the first three series. (Note: In "The Haunting of Bill Crouse", Roy presents a business card that shows only his first name.) Following the broadcast of the episode "The Speech" in 2008, Graham Linehan (the show's writer) blogged a graphic showing Roy's last name as Tenneman, and later changed the spelling to Trenneman for the broadcast of the series 4 episode "Something Happened" in 2010. Roy's family do not appear in the series, but in the episode "Aunt Irma Visits", he finds the resemblance of Moss's psychiatrist to his own mother disturbing.

In the documentary "The IT Crowd Manual", Roy is described as a worker who is engaged beneath his capabilities. O'Dowd said that Roy is slightly more capable of talking to people than Moss, but is still a man-child and slightly socially inept. Critic Boyd Hilton has said that Roy thinks he is on the cool edge of nerdiness. Author Cory Doctorow said that Roy's snark and misanthropy is identifiable to a certain tribe of nerds. Regarding his friendship with Moss, O'Dowd said that it seems as if they met in college. Linehan likened the two to 14-year-olds who like spending time with each other. Linehan said he originally thought the role should not be played by an Irish person, but that O'Dowd was the best man for the job, especially appreciating his physical performances.

=== Maurice Moss ===
- Richard Ayoade

"I came here to drink milk and kick ass, and I've just finished my milk." - Maurice Moss, The IT Crowd

Maurice Moss, or simply Moss, is a computer nerd with a side-parted afro and dark-rimmed glasses. The humour in his character is derived from his socially awkward comments and his complex and in-depth knowledge of specialised technical subjects, including chemistry and electronic engineering. Moss has some quirky habits: He switches through glasses of various sizes in reaction when he and Roy scheme; when his ears get hot, he sprays them with a bottle; he uses inhalers; he can detect chemicals such as rohypnol by smell. When faced with conversation concerning women's topics such as bras, he faints; he also spaces out when confronted with sports topics such as football. He lives with his mother, who sends him to work with an apple each day, and had sued him when he was eleven for breaking a window. He admits he is horrible at lying, and demonstrated this with his lies concerning Jen in the episode "The Haunting of Bill Crouse" when he tells Bill that Jen has died. He suppresses his urges to curse and does not like to break the rules, with an exception in the "Bad Boys" episode when he and Roy ditch work after lunch and he gets in trouble for shoplifting, consequently having to do three hours of community service and give a Scared Straight! talk to some kids.

In "The IT Crowd Manual", Linehan said that Moss was an amalgam of various stereotypes with some uniqueness brought together by him and Ayoade, and described him as a really nerdy guy and a geek. Parkinson said Moss was a classic square, a timeless nerd. Ayoade said Moss was very childlike and positive. He had used his normal voice for Moss, and he liked that Moss sometimes adopts a confident persona like a child would do. Linehan said that he built the show around Ayoade so it was appropriate that he ended the show by turning out the light in the final episode.

=== Jen Barber ===
- Katherine Parkinson

Jen becomes Head of the IT department, having been assigned by Denholm at the start of the series because she had impressed the latter by listing computers on her curriculum vitae, but serves as the department's de facto 'Relationship Manager' owing to Roy and Moss's poor working and social relationship with the rest of Reynholm Industries. She knows very little about electronics and computers, pretending to work even when her desktop and landline phone were revealed to be unplugged or disconnected, making statements at executive meetings such as searching "Google" on the Google website would cause the network to crash, believing that the Internet resides in a physical black box (after being told so by Roy and Moss as a prank) and tolerating a virus-riddled personal laptop. In "Tramps Like Us", during a job interview, she struggles with not knowing what 'IT' even stands for. Jen's position as Head of the IT Department is largely insulated by the relative computer illiteracy of her fellow colleagues.

She becomes obsessed by pursuits such as buying cute shoes even though they are far too small for her feet, and trying to impress good-looking men, but her attempts to start relationships turn out to be disastrous. In series 2, Jen reveals that she was a heavy smoker several years prior; she briefly takes up the habit again, but quits when she realises the anti-smoking regulations have made her more socially isolated.

In an interview with The Independent, Parkinson said that Linehan originally wanted Jen to be "likeable" but "I know what he wanted now – he wanted her to be the more normal person people could relate to.” Although she would act as the straight woman to the two guys, her klutziness was well-received by the audience. Arts critic Rupert Christian describes Jen as the normal person going against the new technology. Parkinson also said that Jen is sometimes shallow and egotistic.

=== Denholm Reynholm ===
- Chris Morris

Denholm is the director of Reynholm Industries at the start of series 1, having started the company with "two things in my possession: a dream, and six million pounds." He openly boasts about employing attractive people who do very little work and who engage in adulterous relationships. In his office, he had a picture of himself on the wall, and of the members of The A-Team on the desk. Whenever he hires a new member of staff, he likes to give them a long, hard stare to assess them. He enjoys setting up initiatives intended to boost performance in a company; for example, he "declares war" on stress, mandating employees to attend a stress management seminar, after which he threatens to fire anyone who does not pass a stress test that same day. In the series 1 finale where he celebrates the success of Project Icarus, he forgets to acknowledge the IT department which did most of the work on the project, preferring to thank everyone else including the janitors. In "Return of the Golden Child", during a company executive meeting, he congratulates himself for being so rich, however, when the police arrive to inquire about irregularities in the company's pension fund, he simply opens a window and jumps to his death. He makes a guest appearance in series 3 when he beckons his son to join him in a place initially presumed to be heaven until Adolf Hitler appears in the doorway. In "The IT Crowd Manual", Denholm is described as strict and slightly sociopathic. Linehan said that Morris had set the tone of the series that the characters cannot be realistic.

=== Douglas Reynholm ===
- Matt Berry

Douglas is introduced in series 2 where he takes over Reynholm Industries after his father Denholm's death. Having been away for seven years because of a court case, he attends Denholm's funeral in a dramatic fashion. He has been described as awful, sex-crazed, and a serial dater. He has a history of sexual harassment, which is one of the conditions he has to control in order to take over the company. He flirts with Jen during the funeral, and later tries to flirt with her when he makes her his personal assistant. As part of the subsequent sexual harassment settlement, he was required to wear "electric sex pants" that deliver shocks whenever he is aroused at work, although Moss disarms them later. In the episode "Something Happened", he practises the religion of "Spaceology" where he applies "space star ordering" and has his hand replaced with a robotic one. He occasionally brings up the topic of denying having killed his first wife Melissa, and in the series 4 finale, he reunites with ex-wife Victoria for two weeks before they break up and he is sued for a large sum of money. In sharp contrast to his father, who was a shrewd and very skilled businessman, Douglas lacks even basic business skills, and his management marks a significant downward spiral in the company's fortunes and finances, not helped by his extravagant spending and wasting of company time and resources.

In an interview with Radio Times, Linehan said "I could easily spend an hour, or half an hour, with Douglas. He's my favourite way of making fun of people that I really loathe, like Rupert Murdoch and Donald Trump. I basically just have happen to him all the things that I'd love to happen to them, and it's basically a really enjoyable process." Linehan also likes Berry's extraordinary voice and gift for comedy. In an interview with Slant, Berry said that the part was written for him, and in Digital Spy, he said he tried to "do his own thing" regarding his portrayal. In "The IT Crowd Manual", Berry described Douglas as so confident and privileged that he did not care where things would come out wrong, cause offence, or make him look like a fool.

=== Richmond Avenal ===
- Noel Fielding

Richmond is a mild-mannered, posh-accented goth who resides in the IT department server room. A former up-and-coming executive reporting to Denholm, he discovered black metal band Cradle of Filth and changed his appearance, causing Denholm to feel rather uncomfortable with his appearance and attitude, especially after Richmond had recommended Denholm's grieving mother also listen to Cradle of Filth. Richmond's absence from series 3 is explained as him having scurvy, but Linehan noted in an episode commentary that Fielding was too busy on other projects. In the series 4 finale, he returns without his goth makeup to testify for Douglas Reynholm's divorce case, having founded a business called Goth2Boss where he helps his fellow goths work in society. In "The Internet Is Coming", he is seen in his original goth costume again. He explains Goth2Boss did not work out as planned and he now works as a voiceover artist.

In "The IT Crowd Manual", Parkinson likened Richmond to a damaged bird and vulnerable. Guest star Lucy Montgomery described Richmond as bit of an Edward Scissorhands. Fielding said he based Richmond's voice on Roger Waters' after watching a Pink Floyd documentary.

== Notable guest appearances ==
- Paul (Danny Wallace): A cultural adviser who is fired by Denholm for his choice of gift to a Japanese company, but regains his position due to his quick use of a "Profanity Buzzer".
- Daniel Carey (Oliver Chris): A security guard that Jen falls for, but unfortunately her plans for romance go awry after she fails to help him as a "phone a friend" on Who Wants to Be a Millionaire?. While he is charismatic and good-looking, he is shown to be quite violent and immature when he brutally beats up a clown with the clown's own shoe for mocking his failure on TV.
- Bill Crouse (Adam Buxton): A senior Reynholm Industries employee, he went on a date with Jen which went badly due to his rudeness to their waiter, his dislike of sharing food despite having gone to a tapas restaurant, and an annoying rising inflection in his voice. After Moss, whilst covering for Jen, told him that she had subsequently died, Crouse proceeded to tell the entire office that he was the last person to sleep with her. Nicknamed "The News" because of his propensity to announce those who he has slept with. Subsequent encounters with Jen make him think she was a ghost haunting him.
- Judy (Cheryl Fergison): A cleaner, who has an unrequited crush on Roy. When Roy offers to do work for his own crush, Julie, he mistakes her for Judy and Julie gives Judy his phone number. Judy deliberately breaks her computer, to get Roy's attention. To cover for Roy, Moss tells her he's dead, but after a huge scream, Judy doesn't seem phased by this. However, she's later haunted when she sees Roy in the street.
- April (Lucy Montgomery): A trans woman journalist working for Richest magazine. April becomes romantically involved with Douglas while writing a magazine article about him. Upon finding out she is trans only after they had slept together (initially mistakenly thinking she was "from Iran" rather than "used to be a man") the two break up, and later fight, ultimately accidentally destroying "The Internet".
- Nolan (Tom Binns) is introduced in series 3 while Reynholm Industries is experiencing financial turmoil worsened by Douglas's cavalier behaviour, Nolan is Douglas's responsible and serious right-hand-man who is trying to hold the company together. He was also the one who introduced Jen to the shareholders during her speech for winning Employee of the Month.
- IT Tech Support (Kevin Eldon): Appearing in "Bad Boys" as a laptop phone technician who responds in a strong and incomprehensible French accent. Linehan had based Eldon's character on his real-life interactions with a French technician. Eldon said that at first, he was upset about the character's silliness but looking back at his role, he said that Graham was exactly right, and that his only criticism was that he should have made him more French and more silly.
- Dr. Mendall (Frances Barber): The company psychiatrist who has a crush on Moss, and the feeling is mutual. Roy claims that she looks exactly like his mother. A drunken Roy sleeps with her after a staff party.

Graham Linehan also had cameo appearances in the series. He portrayed The Blind Sorcerer in the episode "Men Without Women", a Restaurant Musician in the episode "Fifty Fifty", a panicked businessman in "The Speech" and as "Beth Gaga Shaggy", a cult leader in "Something Happened".
