= Diet of Worms (comedy group) =

Irish comedy and theatre group

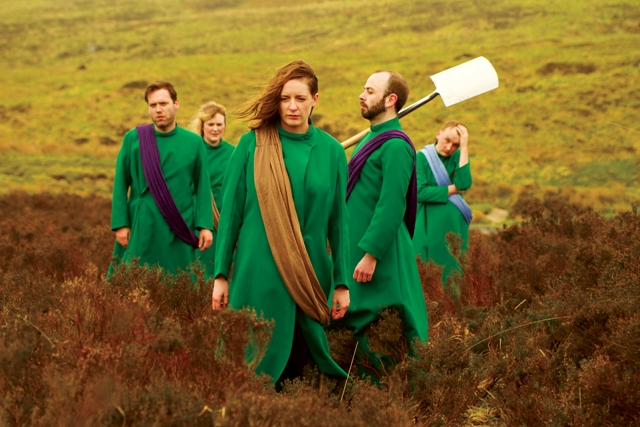
- Promo shot for 2011's CULT. From left to right: Rory Connolly, Philippa Dunne, Amy Stephenson, Niall Gaffney and Shane Langan

Comedy career
- Years active: 2006 to present
- Genres: Sketch Comedy, Theatre, Sitcom, Mocumentary
- Members: Philippa Dunne; Amy Stephenson; Rory Connolly; Niall Gaffney; Shane Langan

Diet of Worms is an Irish comedy and theatre group based in Dublin, Ireland and London, UK, made up of Rory Connolly, Philippa Dunne, Niall Gaffney, Shane Langan and Amy Stephenson. They write and perform sketch and character comedy for stage and screen.

== History ==
The group took their eponymous first show to the Edinburgh Festival Fringe in 2006, only a month after their first live performance together at Dublin's Battle of the Axe comedy club.

In 2007, they took "Diet of Worms on (Melted) Ice", a sketch comedy show performed in a swimming pool, to Edinburgh. They also began to release short mockumentary films online as part of a series entitled "Dublin Stories". The films were a collaboration with filmmakers Alex Gill and Michael Donnelly and were short portraits of odd Dublin characters, created and performed by one or more of the Worms at a time. This was later commissioned by RTÉ to be developed into a half-hour pilot which RTÉ aired in January 2009.

Their 2008 live sketch show was entitled "Friends of the Puffincat". The show ran at the Gilded Balloon during the Edinburgh Festival Fringe. It featured a character created by the group as part of "Adventures of the Puffincat", an online cartoon series they began producing in early 2008. The Puffincat is the apparent star of a faux-Russian children's propaganda cartoon. He is the result of the forced breeding of a puffin and a cat.

In 2010, the group began releasing an online sitcom series called "The Taste of Home". It told the story of a Dublin family called the Walshes, through the lens of a primitive video camera operated by an unseen uncle. The series had five episodes and was set between 1987 and 1990. It was directed by Alex Gill and produced by Michael Donnelly.

In 2010, the group moved from sketch to long form theatre. They presented the play "Strollinstown" at the Dublin Fringe Festival. The show was nominated for the Fishamble New Writing Award. In 2012, the story and characters were re-worked into a live radio production called "The Strollinstown Radio Hour" which was presented as part of the 10 Days in Dublin Festival.

In 2011, they produced a play called "Cult" at the Lir Theatre in the Dublin Fringe Festival which the Irish Times called "sharp and self-aware". Irish Theatre Magazine called it "a highly amusing piece of theatre".

In 2014 Diet of Worms produced a television series, The Walshes (based on their characters from Taste of Home) with Graham Linehan with BBC Television. It was broadcast on BBC Four and RTÉ

In 2016 the Diet of Worms wrote and performed a well-received television "playlet" called "Quints" for Sky Arts.

In 2017 the Worms produced a radio comedy programme called Kult set in a Norwegian Ikea-style furniture store based in Dublin. The programme was broadcast on BBC Radio 4 and also starred Adam Buxton.
