= The Kennedys (2015 TV series) =

- Genre: Sitcom
- Written by: Emma Kennedy
- Directed by: Chris Gernon
- Country of origin: United Kingdom
- Original language: English
- No. of series: 1
- No. of episodes: 6

Production
- Executive producers: Myfanwy Moore; Richard Webb
- Producer: Emma Strain
- Production locations: Stevenage, Hertfordshire, England
- Running time: 27–29 minutes

Original release
- Network: BBC One
- Release: 2 October – 6 November 2015

The Kennedys is a 2015 BBC One British sitcom written by British actress and comedian Emma Kennedy, about her eccentric childhood, on a Stevenage New Town estate, Jessop Square, in the 1970s. The series was based on her memoir.

== Cast ==
- Lucy Hutchinson as Emma Kennedy
- Katherine Parkinson as Brenda Kennedy
- Dan Skinner as Tony Kennedy
- Harry Peacock as Tim
- Emma Pierson as Jenny
- Shola Adewusi as Dee Palmer
- Clive Rowe as David Palmer

== Episodes ==
Episode 1: Secret Whisper (2 October 2015)

Episode 2: Valentine (9 October 2015)

Episode 3: Vikings (16 October 2015)

Episode 4: JessOpportunity Knocks (23 October 2015)

Episode 5: Wedding (30 October 2015)

Episode 6: Camping (6 November 2015)
