= Harry Peacock (actor) =

British actor

- Born: 1 August 1978 (age 48); London, England
- Occupation: Actor
- Years active: 1992–present
- Spouse: Katherine Parkinson (m. 2009)
- Children: 2
- Father: Trevor Peacock
- Relatives: Daniel Peacock (half-brother)

Harry Peacock (born 1 August 1978) is an English actor. He has appeared on film and on television programmes including Toast of London and The Kennedys. He has also appeared in over 50 theatre productions and operas, commercials, and is the co-writer and co-star with Dan Skinner of the comedy podcast Brian and Roger.

== Early and personal life ==
Peacock was born in London, England, the son of the actor and songwriter Trevor Peacock and actress Tilly Tremayne. He appeared alongside his father in a father/son relationship in the UK television series Kingdom. His half-brother is actor and director Daniel Peacock.

Peacock married actress Katherine Parkinson in 2009, and they have two daughters together. Parkinson and Peacock first met in 2003, Parkinson relating, "I met my husband doing a workshop based on the book Heart of A Dog by Mikhail Bulgakov. He was the dog." They both starred in The Kennedys. Peacock has lupus.

== Filmography ==
=== Film ===
Film
Year	Title	Role	Notes
1998	I Just Want to Kiss You	Danny	Short film
2001	High Adventure	Johnny Ford	
2001	Station Jim	George	Television film
2003	Indian Dream	Mark	
2004	Judas	John	
2004	The Banker	Crying man	Short film
2005	Valiant	Recruiting officer	Voice role
2010	Gulliver's Travels	Lilliputian Royal Guard	
2015	Far from the Madding Crowd	Jan Coggan	
2015	High & Dry Blap	Douglas	Television film
2015	We're Doomed! The Dad's Army Story	Michael Mills	Television film

=== Television ===
Television
Year	Title	Role	Notes
1992	The Life and Times of Henry Pratt	Lush	TV miniseries (Episode 2)
1993	The Bill	Kevin Witchell	Episode: "Out of the Mouths"
1995	The Bill	Peter	Episode: "High Score"
1996	No Bananas	Ralph	TV miniseries (Episode: "Cricket")
1997	Pie in the Sky	Mez	Episode: "The Apprentice"
1997	Paul Merton in Galton and Simpson's...	Young boy	Episode: "Visiting Day"
1999	Days Like These	Dylan Jones	Main role
1999	Roger Roger	Darren	Episode: "I'm Not a Little Baby and Daddy Hasn't Gone to Japan"
1999	Harry and Cosh	Unknown	
2000	Jonathan Creek	Floyd Goodman	Episode: "The Three Gamblers"
2001	The Bill	Alan Tovey	Episode: "Collateral Damage"
2001	Band of Brothers	Fake German	TV miniseries (Episode: "Currahee")
2002	My Family	Mr. Bradley's grandson	Episode: "Ding Dong Merrily"
2003	Keen Eddie	Simon	Episode: "Horse Heir"
2006–08	Star Stories	Simon Fuller, George Michael's father, Bono, David Jason, Vinnie Jones, Sylvester Stallone, Ray Winstone, George Clooney, Matt LeBlanc, Jason Orange, Gary Barlow, Rick Astley, Jerome Flynn, Dave Lee Travis, Graham Taylor, Mike Reid, Dane Bowers, Marky Mark	15 episodes
2007	Kingdom	Tom Case Jr.	Series 1, episode 3
2008	Midsomer Murders	Patrick Bradley	Episode: "Left for Dead"
2008	Doctor Who	Proper Dave	Episodes: "Silence in the Library" / "Forest of the Dead"
2008	Wire in the Blood	Victor Del Angelo	2 episodes
2010	Hounded	Funny Bone	Uncredited role (Episode: "Queen Mu")
2012	Grandma's House	Stripper	Episode: "The Day Simon Decided to Express Actual Feelings Just Like a Person"
2012–15	Toast of London	Ray Purchase, Bill Purchase	Main role
2012, 2014	Bad Education	Preet	Episodes "Self Defence" and "Sports Day"
2013	Dracula	Winthrop	Episode: "Servant to Two Masters"
2014	New Tricks	Roald Culley	Episode: "Bermondsey Boy"
2015–16	Drunk History	Policeman, Stanley Gibbons, Thomas Blood's brother-in-law, Joachim von Ribbentrop, Henry George Kendall	4 episodes
2015	Up the Women	Young Winston Churchill	Episode: "Train"
2015	Murder in Successville	Niall Horan	Episode: "The Mob"
2015	The Kennedys	Tim	6 episodes
2016	The Living and the Dead	Smith	2 episodes
2017	Carters Get Rich	Peter Gosling	Episode: "Co-Creator"
2017	The Windsors	Ricky	Series 2, episode 4
2017	Porridge	Dougie Parfitt	3 episodes
2018	High & Dry	Douglas	Main role
2021	Please Help	Uncle Sean	BBC Three pilot
2022	Toast of Tinseltown	Ray Purchase	2 episodes
2022	The Emily Atack Show		1 episode
2024	Changing Ends	Nigel Hudson	Series regular
2024	The Cleaner	Bob Mammot	Episode: "The Wedding"
2026	The Reluctant Vampire	Siegfried Henge	Series 1, episode 6
