= The Speech (The IT Crowd) =

- The IT Crowd episode
- April and Douglas fight in the laboratory
- Episode no.: Season 3 Episode 4
- Directed by: Graham Linehan
- Written by: Graham Linehan
- Production code: 304
- Original air date: 12 December 2008
- Running time: 24 minutes

Guest appearances
- Tom Binns as Nolan; Lucy Montgomery as April

Episode chronology
← Previous "Tramps Like Us"	Next → "Friendface"

"The Speech" is the fourth episode of the third series of the British television sitcom The IT Crowd, and the 16th episode overall. Written and directed by Graham Linehan, it first broadcast on Channel 4 on the 12th of December 2008.

In the episode, Roy Trenneman (played by Chris O'Dowd) and Maurice Moss (played by Richard Ayoade) humiliate Jen Barber (played by Katherine Parkinson) after she wins Employee of the Month at Reynholm Industries after she makes them write her acceptance speech. They lend her a black box claiming it to be the Internet, which she presents at the shareholder's meeting. Meanwhile, Douglas Reynholm (played by Matt Berry) dates a transgender woman named April (played by Lucy Montgomery), believing she is from Iran.

Years after its initial broadcast, the depiction of a transgender woman with the character of April, controversially led to Channel 4 removing the episode from its streaming platform in 2020.

== Plot ==
Jen boasts about winning Employee of the Month to Roy and Moss. She gets a plaque commemorating the award on her office's front door and purchases a new desk. Roy and Moss point out that due to this, she has to give a speech about computers at the monthly shareholder's meeting. After she struggles to put together a speech, she asks Roy and Moss to ghostwrite for her. Roy tells Moss that they should write the speech, noting that Jen's lack of expertise in computers would lead her to blindly trust them, allowing them to humiliate her.

Douglas is interviewed by April, a journalist for Richest magazine for being named the magazine's Man of the Year. He shows her a sketch depicting her with enlarged breasts. After a few questions, he reveals that he admires her and offers to take her to a dinner to Paris, a restaurant in Hull. At the restaurant, Douglas falls in love with April, who points out that she used to be a man. Douglas mishears her statement as her saying that she was from Iran, he accepts her regardless, and they have sex in his bed. Afterwards, they go out together over multiple days doing multiple activities, growing closer.

Moss introduces Jen to a black box with a blinking light, presenting it as "the internet". Roy arrives in the basement and pretends to show panic while she is holding it, claiming that if she broke it, it would result in international chaos. Moss hits back at Roy claiming he spoke to the "elders of the Internet" whom he says were so impressed by Jen's achievement at winning Employee of the Month that they gave him permission to give it to her. Jen is excited at the prospect of the "elders of the Internet" knowing about her, and accepts Roy and Moss' approval for her to use the box for her speech, to the pair's amusement.

Douglas reminisces on the past few days with April in his bed and confesses that he loves her, talking about how she was from Iran. April corrects Douglas stating again that she used to be a man, angering him.

At Jen's acceptance speech at the shareholder's meeting (which Roy and Moss attend, watching with pleasure), she presents the black box as "the Internet", which amazes the shareholders, believing her, confusing Roy. Jen continues to read the speech, stating the chaos that would occur if the box were to break. At a nearby lab, Douglas tells April that he is no longer in love with her due to the fact that she used to be a man, angering her and resulting in a fight which ends in Douglas pushing April through a wall into the conference room towards the end of the speech, thrusting her onto the floor. The box lies broken on the floor, leading to hysteria across the room. After everyone else has fled, Roy and Moss relish with delight at the chaos that they have just caused.

During the credits, Douglas is seen alone at home, regretting breaking up with April.

== Reaction ==
=== 2020 removal ===
Channel 4 removed the episode from its streaming service on 5 October 2020 "in light of current audience expectations" involving the depiction of April and transgender people. The series creator Graham Linehan described the removal of the episode as "an attack on my right to freedom of speech", and described Channel 4's behaviour as disingenuous and motivated by "religious reasons". Linehan felt the joke was "harmless" and says he did not understand the "ferocity" of the response, arguing that a transphobic character did not make him or the episode transphobic.

In an interview with The Spectator about the episode and its ban, he stated that "we are being forced to accept a religious belief that men can become women. It causes harm and leads young people to think that people like JK Rowling hate them".

Linehan has stated that the reaction to the episode caused him to take an active interest in transgender issues, saying in an interview with Andrew Billen in The Times that "When it went out, the pushback was so weirdly aggressive that I just thought there was something a bit strange about it. I thought, this is different from usual. So I started paying attention.".

Matt Berry, whose character in the episode breaks up with and fights a transgender woman, has since described the episode as "ridiculous and dated", stating that he does not condone the portrayal in the episode.
