= Paris (1994 TV series) =

- Title card
- Created by: Graham Linehan; Arthur Mathews
- Directed by: Liddy Oldroyd
- Starring: Alexei Sayle; Neil Morrissey; Allan Corduner
- Country of origin: United Kingdom
- Original language: English
- No. of series: 1
- No. of episodes: 6

Production
- Producer: Talkback Productions
- Running time: 24 minutes approx.

Original release
- Network: Channel 4
- Release: 14 October – 18 November 1994

Paris is a British sitcom produced by Talkback Productions for Channel 4. It was written jointly by Irish writers Arthur Mathews and Graham Linehan, best known for their later sitcom Father Ted. The show only lasted one series, consisting of six episodes, broadcast between 14 October and 18 November 1994. Set in the 1920s, Paris chronicled the antics of a loud-mouthed, hard-drinking French artist called Alain Degout, and the Left Bank pseudo-intellectuals and failed artists he associates with. The show was not well received by the critics, and it has never been repeated.

== Synopsis ==
According to Graham Linehan, "It was about Paris in the 1920s and Alexei Sayle starred as a frustrated artist watching momentous things happen in the world of literature and art." The show lampooned the excesses of the avant-garde art movement in Paris, but also other cultural and political phenomenon of the era, such as the popularity of Jazz and the rise of Communism and Fascism.

== Production ==
Sayle, Linehan, and Mathews had all worked together on The All New Alexei Sayle Show, a comedy sketch show whose first series was broadcast on the BBC in early 1994.

With Alexei Sayle in the lead role, Paris was being fronted by a famous comedian and television veteran, giving it a major audience draw. Sayle was one of the trailblazers of the alternative comedy scene, and his earlier BBC sketch programme Alexei Sayle's Stuff had run for three series between 1988 and 1991, with Sayle winning an Emmy in 1989.

For some scenes, Paris used painted backdrops instead of proper studio sets, which, according to Linehan, gave the sitcom a "fake" feel that made it "harder to engage" with the characters and the fictional world being created.

Speaking to The Guardian in 2013, Linehan said, "It was in the days that I didn't realise writing was rewriting, as they say. We would refuse point-blank to cut the script down to its proper length, so we'd end up with shows that were overlong." This resulted in the recorded episodes being substantially edited down, with many jokes ending up on the cutting room floor.

Channel 4 gave Paris a prominent Friday night slot, with the first episode broadcast on 14 October 1994.

== Critical response ==
The series received poor reviews, has been described as "critically lambasted", and according to the Irish Independent, "Paris more resembled war-torn Beirut".

Linehan later wrote of Paris, "I don't remember the show ever making it on to DVD, which is fair enough. There are fun things in it, but it was a swing and a miss".

However, despite the negative response, Linehan stood by Paris, stating, "It was really painful for us, because I still stand by those scripts. If you look at those scripts, written down, you’d understand why people made it."

== Legacy ==
The key figures who worked on Paris quickly moved on to success in other projects. Linehan and Matthews would receive critical acclaim for Father Ted, whose first series debuted just five months after Paris, and was broadcast by Channel 4. It has been suggested Alain Degout displayed character flaws that resembled those of Father Ted Crilly. For instance, both characters often behaved hypocritically and were easily swayed by temptation (particularly by money).

Prior to Paris, Neil Morrissey, who played Rochet, had already appeared in the second and third series of the sitcom Men Behaving Badly. Morrissey remained with the show, which was a major hit for the BBC during the 1990s. James Dreyfus, who played Belunaire, was in the hit BBC sitcoms, The Thin Blue Line and Gimme Gimme Gimme. The Director of Paris, Liddy Oldroyd, directed Gimme Gimme Gimme.

== Cast ==
- Alexei Sayle as Alain Degout
- Neil Morrissey as Rochet
- Allan Corduner as Minotti
- James Dreyfus as Belunaire
- Simon Godley as Pilo
- Beverley Klein as Mme Ovary
- Walter Sparrow as Hugo

The series contains cameo performances by John Barron, John Bird, Windsor Davies, Ian McNeice, Patrick Marber, Stephen Moore and Rebecca Front. Also, Arthur Mathews and Graham Linehan appear briefly in the first episode playing Gendarmes.

== Episodes ==
No.	Title	Directed by	Written by	Original release date
1	"L'Infamie"	Liddy Oldroyd	Graham Linehan and Arthur Mathews	14 October 1994
Some paint stains and spilt breakfast on Alain's floorboards in his apartment are mistaken by a gallery owner for art and are put up for sale, eventually causing a riot.
2	"Le Critique"	Liddy Oldroyd	Graham Linehan and Arthur Mathews	21 October 1994
Alain tries to advance his career by winning favour with an influential but scathing art critic, Charles Duchont (played by Windsor Davies), who is known as the 'Butcher of Bordeaux'.
3	"Les Gimmiques"	Liddy Oldroyd	Graham Linehan and Arthur Mathews	28 October 1994
Alain hopes to win a lucrative portrait commission by having a gimmick, but soon the rest of his artist friends have jumped on the bandwagon with their own gimmicks. Cameo performances by Stephen Moore as an army general and Rebecca Front as Mme Trombaut.
4	"Les Musiciens"	Liddy Oldroyd	Graham Linehan and Arthur Mathews	4 November 1994
Alain finds himself in an argument with a Jazz band after he is persuaded to impersonate a famous musician as a favour. Cameo performance by Patrick Marber as Paolo.
5	"La Solitude"	Liddy Oldroyd	Graham Linehan and Arthur Mathews	11 November 1994
Alain feels the constant noise and distractions of city life are stifling his creativity, so he decides to head to the countryside and the place where he grew up. Cameo performances by John Barron as Alain's father and Ian McNeice as Leon.
6	"L'Insanitie"	Liddy Oldroyd	Graham Linehan and Arthur Mathews	18 November 1994
Alain is sent to a psychiatric hospital by mistake, but on discharge, he discovers news of his supposed insanity has caused a surge in demand for his art. Cameo performance by John Bird as a psychiatrist.

== Bibliography ==
- Linehan, Graham (2023). Tough Crowd: How I made and lost a career in comedy. London: Eye Books. ISBN 9781785633065.
