= Katherine Parkinson =

English actor

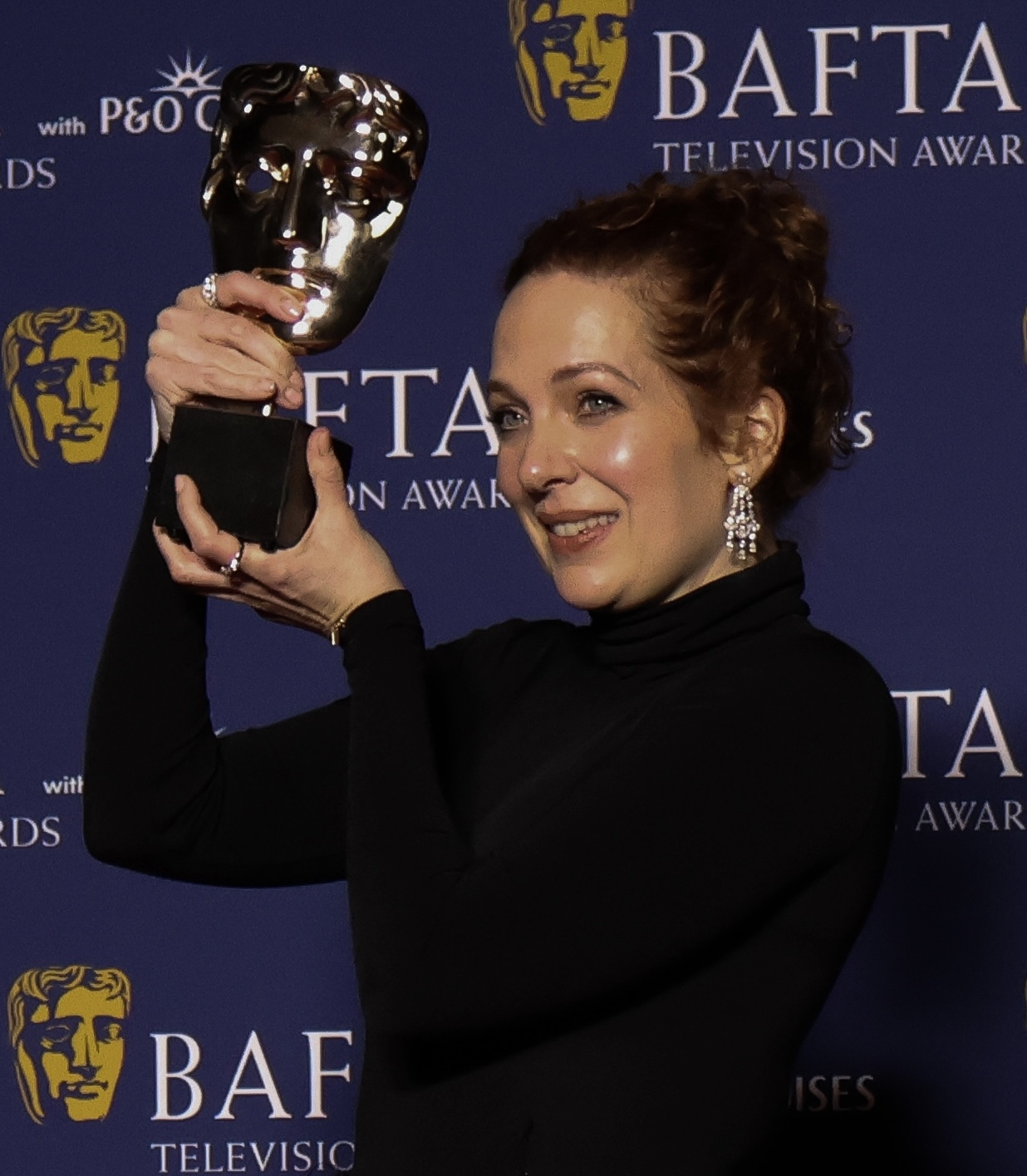
- Parkinson in 2026
- Born: Katherine Parkinson; 1977 or 1978 (age 48–49); Hounslow, West London, England
- Education: St Hilda's College, Oxford (BA)
- Occupation: Actress
- Years active: 2001–present
- Spouse: Harry Peacock (m. 2009)
- Children: 2

Katherine Parkinson (born 1977 or 1978) is an English actress. She appeared in the Channel 4 comedy series The IT Crowd as Jen Barber, for which she won BAFTA's British Academy Television Award for Best Female Comedy Performance in 2014. In 2026, she won her second BAFTA TV Comedy Award for her role in Here We Go.

A University of Oxford graduate, Parkinson studied at the London Academy of Music and Dramatic Art. She has appeared on stage in the plays The Seagull (2007), Cock (2009), and Home, I'm Darling (2018), for which she was nominated for the Olivier Award for Best Actress in a Play.

Parkinson was also a main cast member of the series Doc Martin for three series (2005–2009). She co-starred in all three series of Humans, a science-fiction drama on AMC/Channel 4, which aired from 2015 until 2018. She has also appeared in the films The Boat That Rocked (2009) and The Guernsey Literary and Potato Peel Pie Society (2018).

== Early life ==
Parkinson was born in Hounslow, West London, England, to an English mother, Janet Parkinson, a teacher, and Northern Irish father, the historian Alan Parkinson. She grew up in Tolworth and Surbiton, and attended Tiffin Girls' School before reading classics at St Hilda's College, Oxford. She then attended the London Academy of Music and Dramatic Art, although she left before graduating in order to star in the play The Age of Consent, which premiered at the Edinburgh Festival Fringe in 2001.

== Career ==
From 2005 until 2009, Parkinson played Pauline Lamb, a doctor's receptionist and later phlebotomist, in series two to four of the long-running ITV comedy-drama series Doc Martin.

While working on Doc Martin, she was asked by a friend from London Academy of Music and Dramatic Art, comic actor Chris O'Dowd, to audition for the comedy series The IT Crowd as the show was having trouble casting a female lead. In an interview with The Independent, Parkinson said the show's creator Graham Linehan originally wanted Jen to be "likeable", but she added: "I know what he wanted now – he wanted her to be the more normal person people could relate to." The IT Crowd premiered in 2006 and ran for four series, ending in 2014. Her character of IT Relations Manager shared the lions share of the storylines with her charge, Chris O'Dowd's Roy, a co-boffin with Moss (Richard Ayaode). Parkinson's performance was well received by critics and audiences, prompting her 2011 nomination for, and winning in 2014, the British Academy Television Award for Best Female Comedy Performance.

In 2007 she appeared in a new production of Chekhov's The Seagull at London's Royal Court Theatre, alongside Kristin Scott Thomas and Mackenzie Crook, for which she received positive reviews.

She also contributed sketch characters to Katy Brand's ITV2 show Katy Brand's Big Ass Show (2007–2009), having been friends with Brand since their time at university. At the end of 2009, she appeared in the Olivier award winning play Cock at the Royal Court Theatre with Ben Whishaw and Andrew Scott.

She has performed several times on BBC Radio 4, including on Laura Solon: Talking and Not Talking; Mouth Trap, which she also co-wrote with Brand; and The Odd Half Hour. She also featured in television advertisements for Maltesers alongside fellow actress and comedian Amanda Abbington.

Parkinson played Sophie, one of the lead roles along with Mark Heap in BBC Four's three-part comedy series The Great Outdoors (2010). In 2010 and 2011, she appeared in two plays: Season's Greetings at the National Theatre; and as Lady Teazle in The School for Scandal at the Barbican Centre. That year, she appeared in The Bleak Old Shop of Stuff, which premiered on BBC Two in 2011; in 2012 she made a guest appearance as Kitty Riley in "The Reichenbach Fall", the second series finale of the series Sherlock.

In 2012 and 2013, she played the roles of Diana in Absent Friends at the Harold Pinter Theatre, and Laura in Before the Party at the Almeida Theatre, respectively. In 2014, Parkinson appeared in "Sardines", the first episode of the anthology series Inside No. 9, alongside Ben Willbond, as well as the miniseries The Honourable Woman, which aired in the UK on BBC Two and in the USA on SundanceTV.

In 2015, she starred in the BBC One comedy series The Kennedys, written by Emma Kennedy about growing up on a Stevenage estate in the 1970s. She also played one of the lead roles in all three series of the British-American science fiction series Humans, which aired on Channel 4 and AMC between 2015 and 2018.

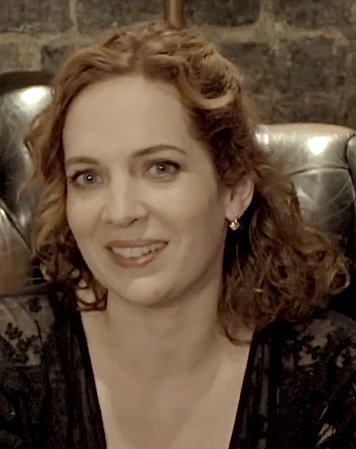
Parkinson being interviewed by Theater Tickets Direct in 2016 for the play Dead Funny

In 2016, Parkinson performed in the stage play Dead Funny at the Vaudeville Theatre. In 2018 and 2019, she performed in Home, I'm Darling, for which she was nominated for an Olivier Award, as well as in Defending the Guilty, a legal sitcom which aired for one series on BBC Two and was subsequently renewed for a second, before being cancelled due to coronavirus.

She played Emma Jeanne Desfosses in Marjane Satrapi's film adaptation of Lauren Redniss's Radioactive in 2019, detailing the life of Marie Curie.

In 2019, Parkinson's debut work as a playwright, Sitting, had its London premiere, following a month-long run at the Edinburgh Fringe. The play was well reviewed, with The Guardian writing "Parkinson delicately reveals connections that, by the end, give the play a wistful emotional weight." Parkinson adapted the play for BBC Four in early 2021.

Parkinson appeared in series 10 of Taskmaster in 2020. Parkinson won the second episode but was behind in total points for the majority of the series, and ended up in last place.

In 2022, Parkinson played Nell Taylor in the film The Nan Movie and, in 2024, she portrayed Lizzie Vereker in Disney+'s period drama Rivals, an adaptation of Jilly Cooper's novel of the same title. For her role in the series, Parkinson was nominated at the 2025 British Academy Television Awards for the Best Supporting Actress category.

In June 2025, it was announced that Parkinson would portray Molly Weasley in the upcoming Harry Potter TV series for which she received attacks on social media regarding writer J. K. Rowling's views.

== Personal life ==
Parkinson married actor Harry Peacock in 2009, and they have two daughters. Parkinson and Peacock first met in 2003, Parkinson relating, "I met my husband doing a workshop based on the book Heart of A Dog by Mikhail Bulgakov. He was the dog." Both starred in the TV series The Kennedys. Peacock has lupus. Parkinson is the daughter-in-law of the late Trevor Peacock. Speaking to Elizabeth Day's podcast in 2026, Parkinson shared her younger aspirations of being an astronaut or working for MI5, going as far as taking the "MI5 exam".

== Filmography ==
Key
†	Denotes works that have not yet been released

=== Film ===
Year	Title	Role(s)	Note
2007	Hard to Swallow	Katie	Short film
2008	Easy Virtue	Marion Whittaker	
2008	How to Lose Friends & Alienate People	PR Woman	
2009	The Boat That Rocked	Felicity	
2009	St. Trinian's 2: The Legend of Fritton's Gold	Physics Teacher	
2010	Cooked	Lucy (voice)	Short films
2011	The Bride of Vernon	Mary Mae (voice)	Short films
2014	Off the Page: Britain Isn't Eating	Marion/Sarah	Short films
2016	The Complete Walk: Much Ado About Nothing	Beatrice	Short films
2018	The Guernsey Literary and Potato Peel Pie Society	Isola Pribby	
2019	Radioactive	Emma Jeanne Desfosses	
2019	How to Fake a War	Kate Hemmings	
2021	Paul Dood's Deadly Lunch Break	Clemmie	
2022	The Nan Movie	Nell Taylor	
2024	That Christmas	Mrs. Forrest (voice)	

=== Television ===
Year	Title	Role	Notes
2005	Ahead of the Class	Vicky Foley	Television film
2005	Casualty	Helen Gibbons	Episode: "The Long Goodbye" (uncredited role)
2005	Extras	Woman in Queue	Episode: "Ross Kemp & Vinnie Jones"
2005–2009	Doc Martin	Pauline Lamb	Series 2-4 & Christmas special, 24 episodes
2006	Comedy Lab	Various roles	Episode: "Slap"
2006–2010, 2013	The IT Crowd	Jen Barber	British Comedy Award for Best Television Comedy Actress; Nominated – BAFTA for Best Female Comedy Performance; Winner of BAFTA award Best Female Performance in a Comedy Programme 2014
2007	Fear, Stress & Anger	Gemma	5 episodes
2007	Love Triangle	Patty (voice)	Television short film
2007	Christmas at the Riviera	Vanessa	Television film
2007–2009	Katy Brand's Big Ass Show	Various characters	18 episodes
2009	Jonathan Creek	Nicola	Episode: "The Grinning Man"
2009–2010	The Old Guys	Amber	8 episodes
2010	The Great Outdoors	Sophie	3 episodes
2010	Whites	Caroline	6 episodes
2011	Psychoville	Fiona	Episode: "The Hunt"
2011	Comedy Showcase	Pip	Episode: "Coma Girl"
2011–2012	The Bleak Old Shop of Stuff	Conceptiva	4 episodes
2011, 2015	Would I Lie to You?	Herself - Panellist	Series 5, Episode 3 Series 9, Episode 2
2012	Sherlock	Kitty Riley	Episode: "The Reichenbach Fall"
2013	Love Matters	Jo Pepper	Episode: "Officially Special"
2014	Cardinal Burns	Super Computer (voice)	Series 2, Episode 4
2014	The Honourable Woman	Rachel Stein	Mini-series; 8 episodes
2014	Inside No. 9	Rebecca	Episode: "Sardines"
2014	Crackanory	Herself - Storyteller	Series 2, Episode 3: "The Crisis Plan"
2014–2016	In the Club	Kim Hall	12 episodes
2015	Horizon	Herself - Narrator	Episode: "Which Universe Are We In?"
2015	The Kennedys	Brenda Kennedy	Lead role; 6 episodes
2015–2018	Humans	Laura Hawkins	Lead role; 24 episodes
2017	Urban Myths	Ange	Episode: "Bob Dylan: Knockin' on Dave's Door"
2018	Hang Ups	Karen Muller	6 episodes
2018–2019	Defending the Guilty	Caroline Bratt	Lead role; 7 episodes
2020	Unprecedented	Liz	Series 1, Episode 3
2020	Taskmaster	Herself - Contestant	Series 10, 10 episodes
2020	Pandemonium	Rachel Jessop	One-off BBC One comedy (pilot episode of Here We Go)
2021	Sitting	Mary	TV adaption of Parkinson's 2018 stage play for BBC Four
2021	Spreadsheet	Lauren	Lead role; 8 episodes
2021	Hitmen	Kat Gaitskill	5 episodes
2022	Travel Man	Herself	Travel documentary
2022–present	Here We Go	Rachel Jessop	Lead role; 13 episodes
2023	Significant Other	Anna	6 episodes
2024	Inside No. 9	Herself	Series 9, Episode: "Plodding On"
2024–present	Rivals	Lizzie Vereker	8 episodes
2026–present	Harry Potter †	Molly Weasley	Recurring cast
TBA	The Dream Lands †	Antonia	Filming

=== Radio ===
Year	Title	Role
2004	A Certain Smile	Catherine
	Good Times Role	Patient
2008	The Odd Half Hour	
2008	Mouth Trap	Writer, performer
2010	Sarah Millican's Support Group	Kim
2011	The Lost Weekend	
2011	The Drover of Clissold Common	
2011	The One and Only	Layla
	Souvenirs	Samantha
2011–2015	Don't Start	Kim
2012	Welcome to Our Village, Please Invade Carefully	Katrina
2012	Diary of a Nobody	Carrie Pooter
2012	The Bat Man	Colette
	The Lady from the Sea	Bolette
2013	Start/Stop	Alice
2019	Date Night	Maddy

=== Stage ===
Year	Title	Role	Notes
2001	The Age of Consent	Stephanie	Pleasance Edinburgh Edinburgh Festival
2002	The Age of Consent	Stephanie	Bush Theatre
2002	Frame 312	Maggie / Doris / Marie	Donmar Warehouse
2002	Deep Throat Live on Stage	Linda Lovelace	Assembly Rooms Edinburgh Festival Fat Bloke Productions
2003	Camille	Olympe	Lyric Hammersmith
2003	The Increased Difficulty of Concentration	Anna Balcar	The Gate (London)
2003	The Riot Act	Antigone	The Gate (London)
2004	The Unthinkable	Fran	Sheffield Crucible
2004	Cigarettes and Chocolate	Gail	King's Head Theatre
2004	Flush	Lily	Soho Theatre
2006	Other Hands	Lydia	Soho Theatre
2006–2007	The Lightning Play	Imogen Cumberbatch	Almeida Theatre
2007	The Seagull	Masha	Royal Court Theatre
2009	Cock	W	Royal Court Theatre
2010	Season's Greetings	Pattie	Royal National Theatre
2011	The School for Scandal	Lady Teazle	Barbican Theatre
2011	66 Books	Jo	Bush Theatre
2012	Absent Friends	Diana	Harold Pinter Theatre
2013	Before the Party	Laura	Almeida Theatre
2016–2017	Dead Funny	Eleanor	Vaudeville Theatre
2018–2019	Home, I'm Darling	Judy	Theatr Clwyd and Royal National Theatre Co-Production Nominated – Olivier Award for Best Actress
2019	Uncle Vanya	Sonya	Theatre Royal Bath
2020	Shoe Lady	Viv	Royal Court Theatre
2022	Much Ado About Nothing	Beatrice	Lyttelton Theatre

=== Video games ===
Year	Title	Role	Notes
2013	Worms Clan Wars	Ms. Tara Pinkle	Narrator
2014	Worms Battlegrounds	Ms. Tara Pinkle	Narrator

== Awards and nominations ==
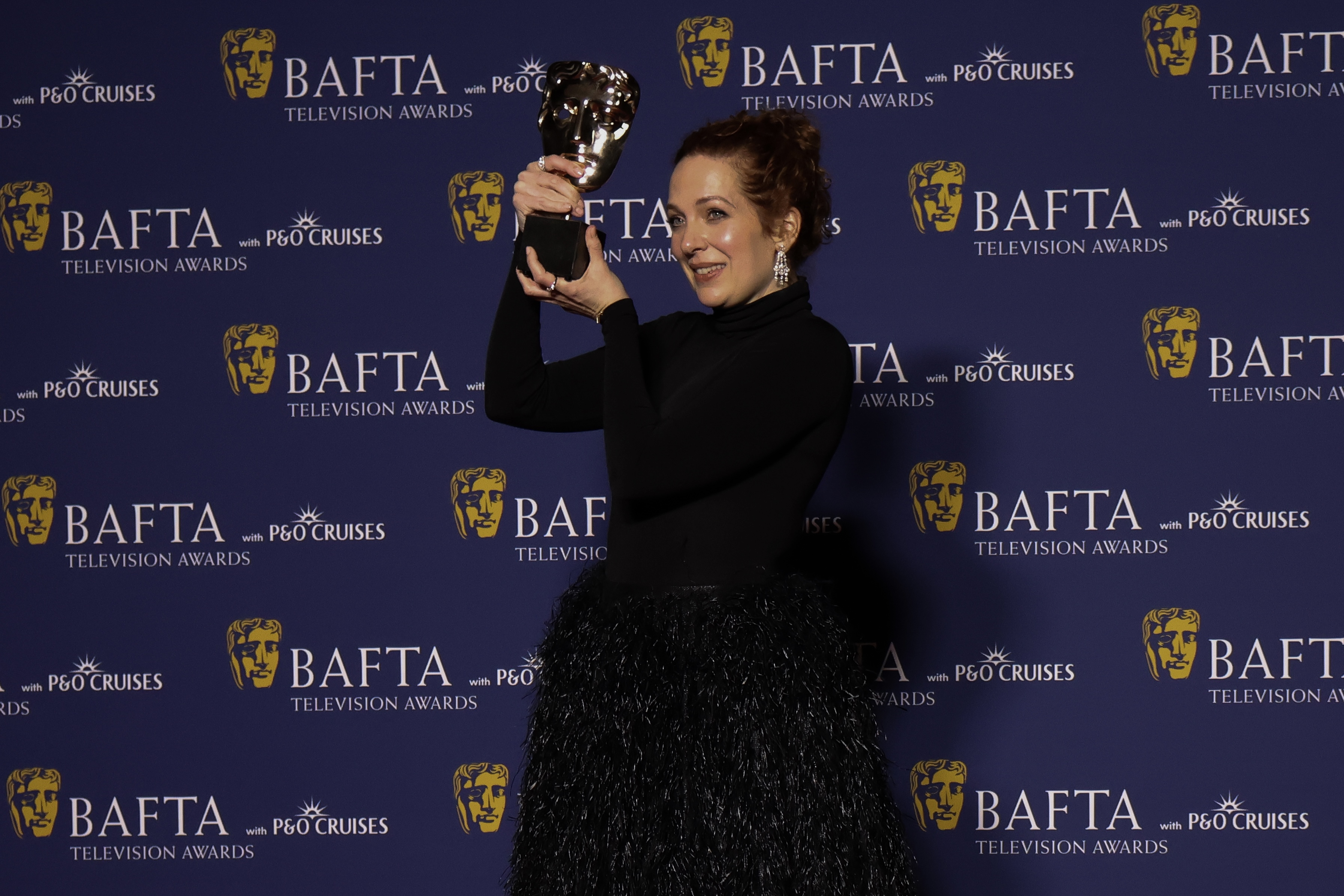
Parkinson at the BAFTA TV Awards 2026

Award	Date	Category	Work	Result	Ref.
2006	British Comedy Awards	Best Female Comedy Newcomer	The IT Crowd	Nominated	
2006	British Comedy Awards	Best TV Comedy Actress	The IT Crowd	Nominated	
2008	Monte-Carlo Television Festival Awards	Golden Nymph - Outstanding Actress - Comedy Series	The IT Crowd	Nominated	
2009	Monte-Carlo Television Festival Awards	Golden Nymph - Outstanding Actress - Comedy Series	The IT Crowd	Nominated	
2009	British Comedy Awards	Best Female Comedy Newcomer	The IT Crowd	Won	
2010	British Comedy Awards	Best TV Comedy Actress	The IT Crowd	Nominated	
2011	British Academy Television Awards	Best Female Comedy Performance	The IT Crowd	Nominated	
2014	British Academy Television Awards	Best Female Comedy Performance	The IT Crowd	Won	
2014	British Comedy Awards	Best TV Comedy Actress		Won	
2025	British Academy Television Awards	Best Supporting Actress	Rivals	Nominated	
2025	Royal Television Society Programme Awards	Supporting Actor – Female	Rivals	Nominated	
2026	British Academy Television Awards	Best Female Comedy Performance	Here We Go	Won	
