= The IT Crowd =

British television sitcom (2006–2013)

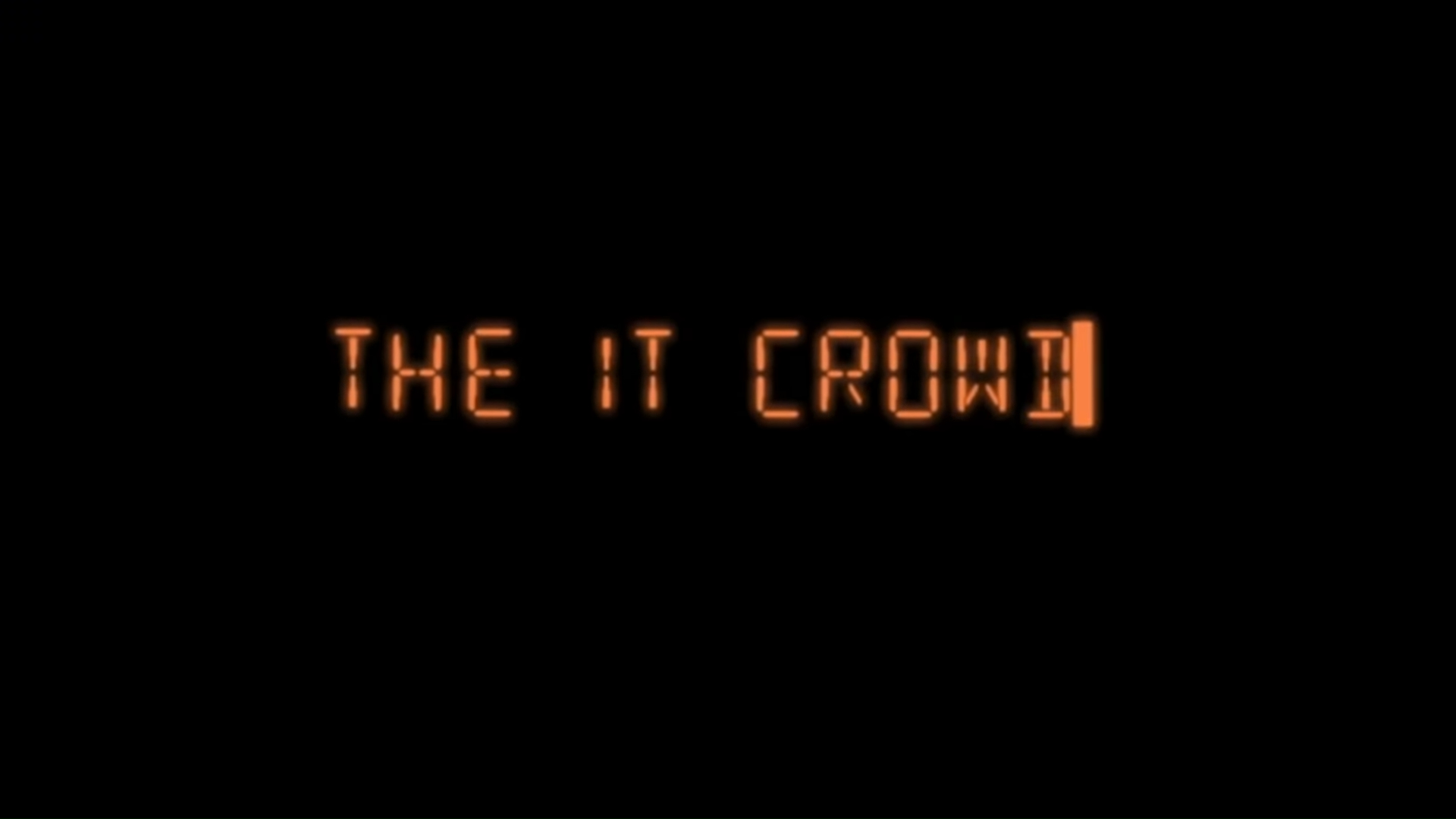
- Genre: Sitcom; Black comedy; Surreal humour; Slapstick
- Created by: Graham Linehan
- Written by: Graham Linehan
- Directed by: Graham Linehan
- Starring: Chris O’Dowd; Richard Ayoade; Katherine Parkinson; Matt Berry; Chris Morris; Noel Fielding
- Music by: Neil Hannon
- Country of origin: United Kingdom
- Original language: English
- No. of series: 4
- No. of episodes: 25 (list of episodes)

Production
- Executive producer: Ash Atalla
- Editors: Paul Machliss; Richard Holiday; Graham Barker
- Camera setup: Multi-camera
- Running time: 24 minutes (special approx 47 minutes)
- Production companies: Talkback Thames (2006–2010); Retort (2013); Delightful Industries

Original release
- Network: Channel 4
- Release: 3 February 2006 – 27 September 2013

The IT Crowd is a British television sitcom originally broadcast by Channel 4, created, written, and directed by Graham Linehan, produced by Ash Atalla and starring Chris O'Dowd, Richard Ayoade, Katherine Parkinson, and Matt Berry.

Set in the offices of the fictional Reynholm Industries in London, the series revolves around the staff of its information technology (IT) department: technical genius Maurice Moss (Ayoade); work-shy Roy Trenneman (O'Dowd); and Jen Barber (Parkinson), the department head/relationship manager who knows nothing about IT. The show also focuses on the bosses of Reynholm Industries: Denholm Reynholm (Chris Morris) and, later, his son Douglas (Matt Berry). Goth IT technician Richmond Avenal (Noel Fielding), who resides in the server room, also appears in several episodes.

The comedy premiered on Channel 4 on 3 February 2006 and ran for four seasons of six episodes each. Although a fifth series was commissioned, it was not produced. The series finale was broadcast on 27 September 2013. The IT Crowd received critical acclaim and has a cult following.

== Series overview ==
Series	Episodes	Originally released	
Series	Episodes	First released	Last released
1	6	3 February 2006	3 March 2006
2	6	24 August 2007	28 September 2007
3	6	21 November 2008	26 December 2008
4	6	25 June 2010	30 July 2010
Special		27 September 2013	

The IT Crowd is set in the offices of Reynholm Industries, a fictional British corporation based at 123 Carenden Road in Central London. It focuses on the shenanigans of the three members of the IT support team, who work in a dingy, cluttered basement – a great contrast to the shining modern architecture and stunning London views enjoyed by the rest of the organisation. The obscurity surrounding the company's business is a running gag; it is stated that the company has bought and sold ITV, has a chemicals laboratory, and makes an unnamed product. In one episode, Denholm Reynholm claims the company has bought mobile phone carriers and television stations, creating "the largest communications empire in the UK", but it is unclear whether this is true within the fictional world of the show. Although 123 Carenden Road is a fictitious address, one episode sees the trio visiting the New Wimbledon Theatre in London, which is said to be a ten-minute walk from the office.

Roy and Moss, the two technicians, are socially inept geeks or, in Denholm Reynholm's words, "standard nerds". Despite the company's dependence on them, they are generally ignored and considered losers by the rest of the staff. Roy's support techniques include ignoring the phone, hoping it will stop ringing, and using reel-to-reel tape recordings of stock IT suggestions such as, "Have you tried turning it off and on again?" and "Is it definitely plugged in?". He wears a different geek-related T-shirt in most episodes. Moss' deep knowledge of technical topics is reflected in his extended, overly detailed suggestions, while he cannot deal with practical problems such as extinguishing fires and removing spiders. His shyness makes it difficult for him to relate to others, often leading him to cite bizarre facts or dwell on himself and/or technology. When someone shows their ignorance about computers, he can be arrogant.

Jen, the team's newest member, is hopelessly non-technical, despite claiming on her CV that she has "a lot of experience with computers", often pronouncing the word as "comp-you-ters". As Denholm is equally technologically illiterate, Jen's interview bluffing convinces him she should be the head of the IT department. After meeting Roy and Moss, Jen redefines her role as "Relationship Manager", yet her attempts to bridge the gap between the technicians and the company's other employees generally have the opposite effect, landing her and her teammates in ludicrous situations.

== Cast and characters ==
From left to right: Jen, Moss and Roy

- Chris O'Dowd as Roy Trenneman, a snarky Irish IT technician. He despises his job, as it requires him to work beneath his capabilities, and he often goes to great lengths to distract his workmates so he can relax and enjoy reading comic books or playing video games.
- Richard Ayoade as Maurice Moss (typically referred to simply as "Moss"), a painfully shy, highly intelligent IT technician with few social skills.
- Katherine Parkinson as Jen Barber, Roy's and Moss's tech-illiterate manager. Roy and Moss initially resent her but soon find she is helpful to them in interacting with "socially normal" people.
- Chris Morris as Denholm Reynholm (series 1; recurring series 2; guest series 3), the egocentric founder and CEO of Reynholm Industries.
- Matt Berry as Douglas Reynholm (series 3–special; recurring series 2), Denholm's long-lost, womanising son, who returns to inherit Reynholm Industries in series 2 when his father, under investigation for embezzlement, steps out of a window.
- Noel Fielding as Richmond Felicity Avenal (special; recurring series 1–2; guest series 4), a former up-and-coming executive banished to the IT department's server room after he became a goth.

== Production ==
Creator Graham Linehan wrote the series after a PC Tech with poor people skills made a house call. The show was video-recorded with a live studio audience. Of this choice, Linehan said, "I trust my instincts, so I'm going to do it my way and hope people come to me." The first series was recorded at Teddington Studios, and subsequent series at Pinewood Studios, with intermittent location footage at locations such as Thomas More Square (E1W) and Amhurst Road (E8). Cinematic-style footage was recorded before live tapings. The show's title sequence was produced by Shynola.

== Broadcast and release ==
=== International syndication ===
The programme is broadcast internationally. In Australia, it has been broadcast on ABC1 and UKTV. In Bulgaria, GTV began airing it in July 2008. Comedy Central Germany started airing the first series in September 2009. ETV has aired the programme in Estonia. In Poland it has been shown on Comedy Central Poland, TVP2, and Fox Comedy. In the Czech Republic, it was broadcast on Czech Television and HBO. TV 2 Zulu has aired it in Denmark, as has Comedy Central in the Netherlands. Canal+ runs it in Spain. It aired in New Zealand on TV One. It airs sporadically in the Republic of Ireland on RTÉ2 and on the RTÉ Player.

In the United States, episodes have been shown on IFC; all four series and the special are also available on Tubi TV, Pluto TV, Amazon Prime Video, and for purchase in the iTunes Store. Canadian channel G4 ran the programme during their Adult Digital Distraction block in July 2007. Reruns also aired on BiteTV in Canada until it relaunched as "Makeful" in August 2015. It was broadcast in Brazil, Argentina, and Chile on I.Sat. In Mexico, it has aired on Canal 11 since 2010. It was also broadcast in Spain on Canal 3xl in 2011.

=== Ending and future ===
A fifth series was commissioned by Channel 4 for release in 2011. Series creator Graham Linehan stated that it would be the programme's last series, and that it would serve as a "goodbye to the characters". The writing team were unable to meet regularly, so they created a virtual writers room using the online project-management tool Basecamp. Linehan found it a disadvantage, calling it "a stuffy, businesslike service that I think it actually ended up making everyone self-conscious", but there was no suitable alternative. Nonetheless, the writers did formulate some story ideas (one was reportedly a Die Hard–based episode), but ultimately, Linehan did not consider the arrangement practical. Due to this, Linehan's conflicting schedule, and the show's budget requirements, the fifth series was shelved.

However, Linehan felt a special "farewell" episode could be produced. He was already busy with his TV adaptation of Count Arthur Strong and his work on The Walshes, and the actors had also taken on other commitments. Thus, it was not until June 2013 that the show's final episode was filmed.

Linehan said he would like to explore particular characters in future spin-off-style specials, particularly Matt Berry's character, Douglas. In a 2014 interview, Linehan said he had a half-formed idea about expanding on the Douglas character but that with Berry busy with his series Toast of London, Linehan would need to "pounce when he's taking a rest". Linehan has also discussed reprising Benedict Wong's character Prime from the episode "The Final Countdown". Wong has said he would be "thrilled" if Prime got his own series, joking that it could be called Prime Time.

=== Home media ===
Series	Episodes	DVD release date (Note: A Region 2 box set containing both the first and second series was released on 1 October 2007.) (Note: A Region 2 box set containing the first three series was released on 16 March 2009 under the 2ENTERTAIN label.)		
Series	Episodes	Region 1	Region 2	Region 4
1	6	31 March 2009	13 October 2006	6 December 2006
2	6	30 June 2009	1 October 2007	19 March 2009
3	6	15 September 2009	16 March 2009	1 April 2010
4	6	14 December 2010	27 September 2010	2 December 2010
Special	1	17 January 2017	23 November 2015	18 December 2013

The first series was released in the UK as The IT Crowd – Version 1.0 in November 2006 by 2 Entertain Video Ltd. The DVD start-up sequence and subsequent menus are designed to resemble a ZX Spectrum. The DVD included a short film written and directed by Linehan called Hello Friend, his directorial debut, and a tongue-in-cheek behind-the-scenes documentary presented by Ken Korda, a filmmaker created and portrayed by comedian Adam Buxton, of Adam and Joe.

The IT Crowd – Version 2.0 DVD was released in the UK in October 2007, with a box set containing both the first and second series. Retail chain HMV sold an exclusive limited-edition version featuring a set of four postcards in the style of popular viral photos such as Ceiling Cat – here replicated as Ceiling Goth. While the first series DVD menus parodied 8-bit games, the Series 2 DVD menus parody 16-bit games and refer to the "All your base are belong to us" meme popularised by Zero Wing, Mortal Kombat, Tetris and Lemmings. There are several "hidden" extras encoded into the subtitles. These are done in much the same way as the base64 subtitles from Series 1, and include three JPG images and a text adventure game file. Episode 4 has a BBC BASIC listing. Episode 6 has light bars in the corner of the screen, which can be decoded using a barcode reader.

Series 3 was released in March 2009. The DVD menus are based on such internet games as GROW CUBE, Doeo and flow. The DVD for series four was released in the UK in September 2010, also under the 2|entertain label. A boxset containing all four series was released the same day, which includes an IT Crowd-themed board game.

The series 4 DVD includes a documentary feature on computer games, which inspired the menus on each of the series' DVDs, culminating in the game Windosill, the basis for the series 4 DVD. The Internet Is Coming was released in Australia in December 2013, but had yet to be released elsewhere until it was announced in November 2015 that a Region 2 DVD version would be released in the United Kingdom and throughout Region 2 on 23 November 2015. All episodes of the programme are available to stream in the United Kingdom and the Republic of Ireland on All 4, except the fourth episode of series three, "The Speech", which was removed from Channels 4's streaming service on 4 October 2020 for perceived transphobic themes.

== Reception ==
Series 1 of The IT Crowd holds an average Metacritic critic score of 67/100 from eight reviews.

=== Ratings ===
The premiere of the programme on Channel 4 was watched by 1.8m viewers, described as "disappointing" by BBC News. Linehan stated he was "playing the long game" and reflected how the first series of Father Ted also "went pretty unnoticed" but went on to gain viewers and awards. The series four finale on 30 July 2010 reached its ratings peak of 2.17 million, and was highly successful in its time slot.

=== Awards and nominations ===
The IT Crowd has won awards from the British Academy of Film and Television Arts (BAFTAs), the International Academy of Television Arts and Sciences (the International Emmys), the Rose d'Or television entertainment awards, and from the fan voted Comedy.co.uk Awards organised by the British Comedy Guide. It received a British Comedy Awards and an Irish Film and Television Award.

In 2006, the series was voted Best New British Sitcom at the 2006 Comedy.co.uk Awards, out of 17 nominees. In 2007, it was voted Comedy of The Year at the 2007 Comedy.co.uk Awards, out of 100 nominees. Nominated in the 2007 BAFTAs for Best Situation Comedy, alongside Green Wing and Pulling, it lost to The Royle Family. In 2008, the series won the International Emmy Award for Comedy and the 2008 Rose d'Or for Best Sitcom.

Nominated in the 2008 BAFTAs for Best Situation Comedy alongside The Thick of It and Benidorm, it lost to Peep Show. In 2009, it won Best Situation Comedy at the 2009 BAFTAs. Also in 2009, Graham Linehan won Best Television Script at the 6th Irish Film and Television Awards, and Katherine Parkinson won Best Comedy Actress at the 2009 British Comedy Awards.

At the 2014 British Academy Television Awards, Parkinson won Best Female Comedy Performance; Richard Ayoade won Best Male Comedy Performance; and Chris O'Dowd was nominated in the same category.

== Adaptations ==
=== American versions ===
The main cast of the American version (left to right) Jen, Roy, Moss, and Denholm

An American version of The IT Crowd was almost aired by NBC in 2007–08, starring Richard Ayoade reprising his role as Moss, with Joel McHale as Roy, Jessica St. Clair as Jen, and Rocky Carroll as Denholm. It was produced by FremantleMedia for NBC Universal Television Studio with Steve Tao as executive producer. Linehan was credited as executive producer but stated he was not involved. The writing staff was David Guarascio, Moses Port, Joe Port, and Joe Wiseman. A pilot was filmed in January 2007. A full series was ordered and advertised by NBC to be aired in 2007–08.

A September 2007 report in The Hollywood Reporter said that the show would not reach production, despite the development of several scripts, as it "didn't quite spark" with new NBC chairman Ben Silverman. In 2012, the pilot was leaked online.

In October 2014, it was announced that NBC would produce another pilot, produced by Bill Lawrence. It, too, did not make it to air.

In January 2018, a third attempt at an NBC remake was confirmed. Unlike the two previous versions, Graham Linehan was to be involved as a writer and executive producer. However, no further developments have been announced.

=== German version ===
The main cast of the German version (left to right, from top) Jen, Roy, Moss and Denholm (bottom)

A German version of the programme was in production from June 2007, starring Sky du Mont, Sebastian Münster, Stefan Puntigam and Britta Horn. Originally titled Das iTeam – Die Jungs mit der Maus (The iTeam – The Boys with the Mouse), the title was changed to Das iTeam – Die Jungs an der Maus (The iTeam – The Boys at the Mouse) at the last minute. The first episode was aired on 4 January 2008 on Sat.1 and received mainly negative receptions. It was criticised for the poor translation of the original stories and jokes, poor direction, poor timing, and the poor performance of the actors, mainly Stefan Puntigam as Gabriel (the German version of Moss).

Quotenmeter's Manuel Weis panned the programme, commenting: "It could indeed be possible that the boys of class 10a from secondary school Brunsbüttel made the series. In short: In this form 'The iTeam' should never have come onto the screen. The look is strongly reminiscent of cheap crime documentaries airing in the afternoon and the actors are reminiscent of lousy daytime formats. The climax of these catastrophes is [...] Stefan Puntigam, who embodies the role of the computer geek Gabriel. [...] his role seems artificial, exaggerated and in any case badly acted." The IT Crowd creator Graham Linehan noted in his blog that even the first gag did not work because it was viewed from the wrong angle. The programme was cancelled after only two episodes due to low ratings. All episodes were later screened on Sat.1 Comedy.
