= The Walshes =

Irish/British sitcom (RTÉ/BBC 2014)

- Genre: Comedy
- Created by: Diet of Worms; Graham Linehan
- Based on: The Taste of Home by Diet of Worms
- Written by: Diet of Worms; Graham Linehan
- Directed by: Graham Linehan
- Starring: Rory Connolly; Philippa Dunne; Niall Gaffney; Shane Langan; Amy Stephenson; Owen Roe
- Composer: Neil Hannon
- Country of origin: Ireland
- Original language: English
- No. of series: 1
- No. of episodes: 3 (list of episodes)

Production
- Producer: Richard Boden
- Production companies: Boom Pictures; Delightful Industries

Original release
- Network: RTÉ One; RTÉ One HD; BBC Four; BBC Four HD
- Release: 6 March – 27 March 2014

The Walshes is an Irish comedy television series that was first broadcast on RTÉ One on 6 March and BBC Four on 13 March 2014. The three-part series was written by Graham Linehan and the comedy group Diet of Worms, and is based on the group's 2010 web series The Taste of Home. The show follows the Walshes, a tight-knit family living in the fictional West Dublin suburb of Strollinstown. Diet of Worms portray the family, reprising their roles from the web series.

In Britain, the show was originally shown on BBC Four and was broadcast again on BBC Two in November 2014. The writer, Graham Linehan, has said that if the show gets higher viewing figures this time it may come back with a new series. In January 2015, Graham Linehan announced on Twitter that the show had been cancelled, blaming "zero publicity" from BBC Two.

== Cast ==
- Niall Gaffney as Tony
- Philippa Dunne as Carmel
- Amy Stephenson as Ciara, daughter of Tony and Carmel
- Rory Connolly as Rory, son of Tony and Carmel
- Shane Langan as Graham, Ciara's new boyfriend
- Owen Roe as Martin, a family friend

== Production ==
The show is based on The Taste of Home, a five-episode web series released in 2010, starring and written by the comedy group Diet of Worms. In November 2013, it was reported that Linehan had directed a pilot based on the web series, marking his first non-audience sitcom. The show is co-produced by Boom Pictures and Delightful Industries for RTÉ and the BBC, but was originally intended for ITV. Richard Boden serves as producer. Studio filming took place at Teddington Studios in London, while some location filming took place in Dublin.

== Episode list ==
No.	Title	Directed by	Written by	Original release date
1	"Doctor Burger"	Graham Linehan	Diet of Worms; Graham Linehan	6 March 2014 (RTÉ One); 13 March 2014 (BBC Four)
2	"Family Night"	Graham Linehan	Diet of Worms; Graham Linehan	20 March 2014 (BBC Four)
3	"Limbo"	Graham Linehan	Diet of Worms; Graham Linehan	27 March 2014 (BBC Four)
