= Graham Linehan =

Irish writer and anti-transgender activist (born 1968)

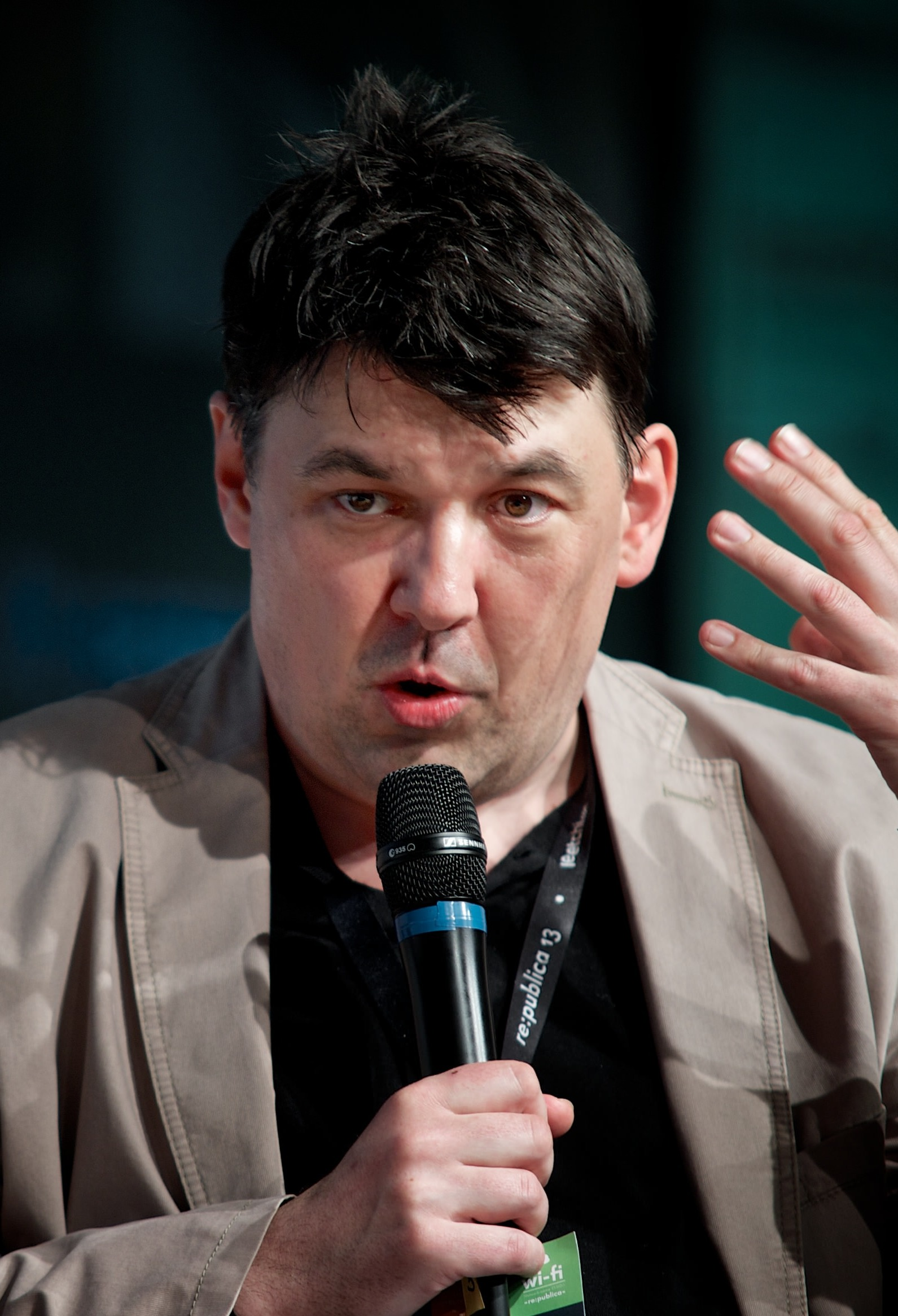
- Linehan in 2013
- Born: Graham George Linehan; May 1968 (age 58); Dublin, Ireland
- Education: Catholic University School
- Occupations: Comedy writer; anti-transgender activist
- Notable work: Father Ted; Big Train; Black Books; The IT Crowd
- Spouse: Helen Serafinowicz (m. 2004; div. 2020)
- Children: 2

Comedy career
- Years active: 1991–present
- Medium: Television
- Genres: Observational comedy; surreal humour

Graham George Linehan (/ˈlɪnəhæn/; born May 1968) is an Irish comedy writer and anti-transgender activist. He created or co-created the sitcoms Father Ted (1995–1998), Black Books (2000–2004), The IT Crowd (2006–2013), and Count Arthur Strong (2013–2017), and the sketch comedy show Big Train (1998–2002). He also contributed to other comedy shows, including The Fast Show, The Day Today, and Brass Eye. During the 1990s, his writing partner was Arthur Mathews, with whom he created Father Ted and Big Train.

Linehan has won five BAFTA awards, including two awards for Best Comedy for Father Ted and one for Best Writer, Comedy, for The IT Crowd. In 2008, he was awarded an International Emmy for The IT Crowd.

Linehan became involved in anti-transgender activism after an episode of The IT Crowd was criticised as transphobic. He argues that transgender activism endangers women and has likened the use of puberty blockers to Nazi eugenics. Linehan said his activism had ended his marriage and lost him work, such as a planned Father Ted musical.

== Life and career ==
Graham George Linehan was born in Dublin in 1968 and attended Catholic University School, a Roman Catholic secondary school for boys. In the 1980s, he joined the staff of the Dublin politics and music magazine Hot Press, where he met his future writing partner, Arthur Mathews. In their early collaborations, they created segments in sketch shows including Alas Smith and Jones, Harry Enfield & Chums, The All New Alexei Sayle Show, The Day Today and the Ted and Ralph characters in The Fast Show. They continued their collaboration with Paris (one series, 1994), Father Ted (three series, 1995–1998), and the first series of the sketch show Big Train. They also wrote the "Dearth of a Salesman" episode for the series Coogan's Run, which featured the character Gareth Cheeseman. In late 2003, Linehan and Mathews were named one of the 50 funniest acts to work in television by The Observer. Father Ted won BAFTA awards for Best Comedy in 1996 and 1999.

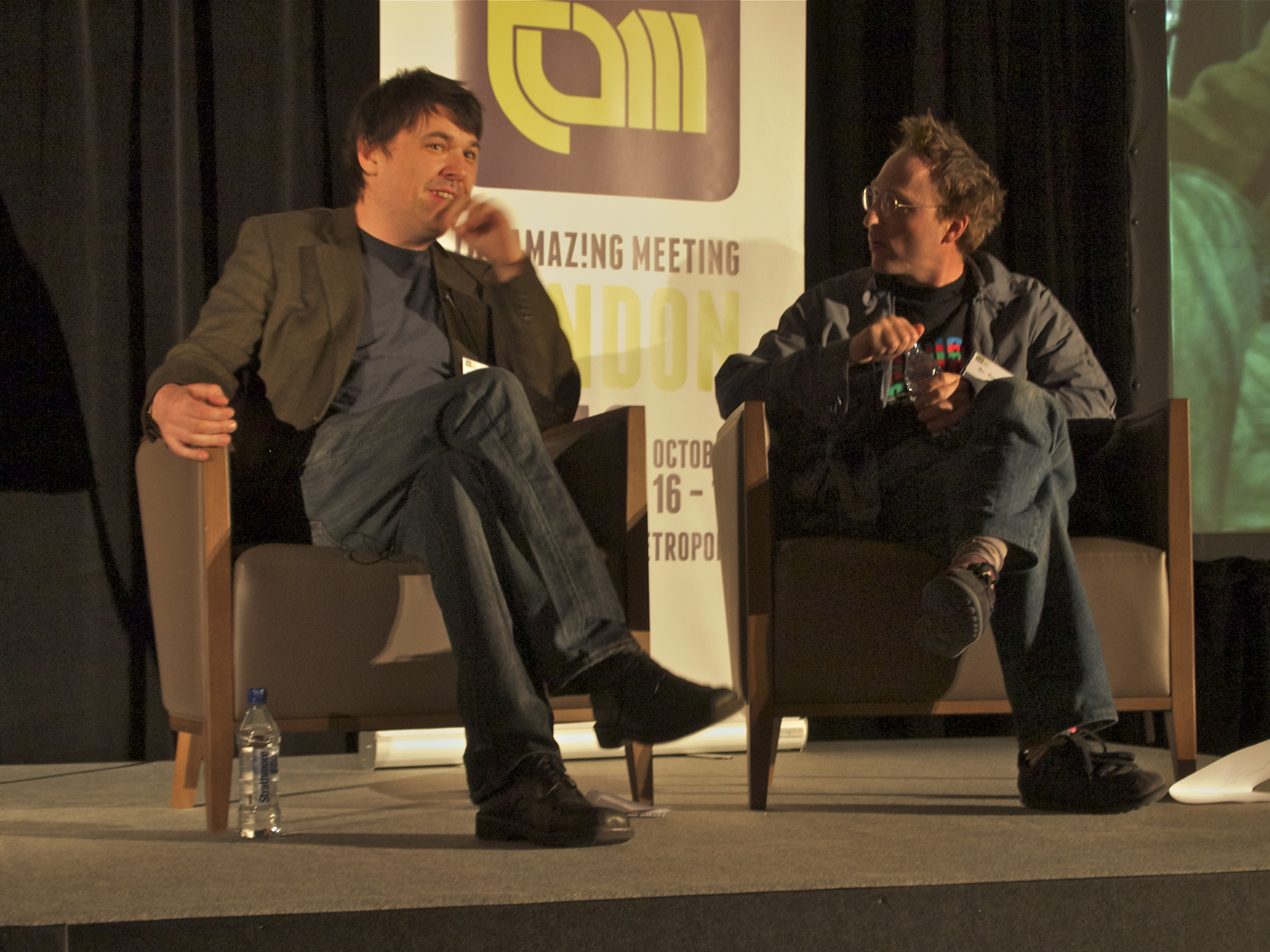
Graham Linehan with the writer Jon Ronson at TAM London 2010. Their friendship ended after Ronson did not endorse Linehan's position on trans rights.

Linehan wrote for the satirical series Brass Eye (1997), Blue Jam (1997–1999) and Jam (2000). With the actor Dylan Moran, he created the sitcom Black Books (2000–2004). Linehan wrote and directed the 2006 Channel 4 sitcom The IT Crowd, in which he sought to move away from the British trend towards mockumentary comedies. Unlike many series of the time, it was recorded before a studio audience. In November 2008, he was awarded an International Emmy for The IT Crowd. In 2013, he wrote and directed the sitcom The Walshes. He co-wrote the first series of the BBC sitcom Motherland and directed its pilot episode. In 2014, Linehan won his fifth BAFTA, for Best Writer, Comedy, for his work on The IT Crowd. He was also nominated for Count Arthur Strong.

In 2018, Linehan and Mathews announced plans for a Father Ted musical. Linehan said it would finish the series as they had planned it before the death of the lead actor, Dermot Morgan. The musical was cancelled by producers following the controversy over Linehan's views on transgender rights. In December 2024, Linehan announced plans to move to Arizona to work on a sitcom and create a production company with the comedians Rob Schneider and Andrew Doyle.

Linehan and Mathews made cameos in their programmes. They also appeared in the sitcom I'm Alan Partridge as two Irish TV producers considering Alan Partridge (Steve Coogan) for a contract.

=== Memoir ===
Linehan's memoir, Tough Crowd: How I Made and Lost a Career in Comedy, was published in October 2023. The month before publication, it had the second-highest number of pre-orders for a book on Amazon. It reached number ten on the Sunday Times bestseller list after it was published. Linehan wrote of his childhood, career, and his five years as an anti-transgender activist.

Reviewing Tough Crowd in The Guardian, Fiona Sturges wrote that while Linehan's account of his comedy career has "verve and charm", the memoir "reads less like the story of a man heroically cleaving to his principles than a document of a peculiar and self-defeating obsession, a sad coda to a once towering talent". In The Critic, Ben Sixsmith described Tough Crowd as "very entertaining" with "some valuable insights into comedy", but that Linehan "admits to losing his rag in a way that might not always be productive". In The Irish Times, Houman Barekat wrote that it had "two distinct narratives" and was "a discomfiting read not because it contains hard-hitting home truths, but because its author clearly hasn't worked through his issues". For The Spectator, Debbie Hayton wrote that it was "a book of two halves" that "may well appeal to two completely different audiences", concluding that "if they want to understand the man they need to read it all". Louis Chilton of The Independent described it as "a strange, sad read ... that crumbles under the slightest scrutiny".

=== Other work ===
Linehan's children voiced characters in the 2012 Adventure Time episode "Goliad", with Linehan directing the children while taking the producers' instructions over the phone. He planned to write a sequel episode, and sent versions of the story to the production team. The episode was never made as Adventure Time ended in 2018. In 2023, Linehan performed a stand-up comedy set at the Backyard Comedy Club in London.

== Anti-transgender activism ==
Linehan is involved in anti-transgender activism. By the time he went into cancer surgery in 2018, he had already drawn attention for publicly siding with gender-critical people, yet as he describes in his memoir, "I had not quite nailed my colours to the gender-critical mast." From his hospital bed, he "sent a few tweets carefully explaining my position", which he believed to be "sound" and "in good faith", having thus "identified myself as a 'Terf' ally". Later that year, he expressed these views on a podcast.

The topic had come up for him in 2013, when an old episode he had written for The IT Crowd was publicly reexamined and widely criticised as transphobic and sexist. Critics said the 2008 episode, "The Speech", used gender stereotypes and trivialised violence against transgender women. The episode features a man who learns that his girlfriend is transgender and gets into a physical fight with her. Channel 4 removed the episode from syndication and streaming in 2020. Linehan felt the joke was "harmless" and says he did not understand the "ferocity" of the response, arguing that a transphobic character did not make him or the episode transphobic.

Linehan has said he is sceptical of gender self-identification, objecting to "privileged white people saying you must accept anyone who says they are a woman". He said that "anyone suffering from gender dysphoria needs to be helped and supported", but he voiced concern over early transgender intervention for children. He used the social network Twitter to criticise "trans ideology", which he believes misrepresents transgender people and lesbians.

=== Before first Twitter ban ===
In 2018, Linehan praised anti-transgender protesters at that year's London Pride event who had carried banners and flyers saying that "transactivism erases lesbians", calling them "heroes".

In a December 2018 interview with Derrick Jensen, Linehan said: "I'm now in a position where I can answer the question honestly of 'if you were around at the time of something terrible happening like Nazism, or whatever it happened to be, would you be one of the people who said "no, this is wrong", despite being opposed?'" He also said the trans movement provides "cover" for "fetishists, con men, and simply abusive misogynists". In an interview with the BBC television programme Newsnight in February 2020, Linehan stated that the Tavistock Centre was providing puberty blockers to the gender-nonconforming children of homophobic parents, with the effect of eliminating gay people, which he compared to Nazi eugenics and experiments on children. Following this interview, Eric Pickles, the United Kingdom Special Envoy for Post-Holocaust Issues, accused Linehan of trivialising the Holocaust.

In January 2019, Linehan expressed concern over the news that Mermaids, a charitable advocacy organisation for transgender children and teenagers, was to receive a £500,000 lottery grant to open clinics around the United Kingdom. He posted to the internet forum Mumsnet encouraging its users to lobby the National Lottery Community Fund to reverse its decision. The grant was reviewed and went ahead. In response to Linehan, YouTuber Hbomberguy held a 57-hour fundraising livestream that raised £270,000 more for Mermaids. The same year, British journalist Dawn Foster accused Linehan and others of targeting a National Society for the Prevention of Cruelty to Children (NSPCC) employee who had been responsible for hiring model and activist Munroe Bergdorf, a transgender woman. Foster called the online abuse "transphobic" and "flatly homophobic". Journalist Chris Godfrey called the treatment of the employee "insidious homophobia".

In June 2020, Linehan criticised comments about author J. K. Rowling after she made comments that were described as transphobic. He linked to a blog post featuring screenshots of replies Rowling had received, which Linehan described as abuse, followed by describing those who wrote them as "ignoring the abuse received by women who speak out against gender ideology" and "literally useless". Hozier, tagged in Linehan's tweets due to his trans-rights advocacy, responded by saying Linehan was conducting an "obsessive little culture war".

=== Twitter ban and evasions ===
On 27 June 2020, Linehan's Twitter account was permanently suspended after what Twitter called "repeated violations of our rules against hateful conduct and platform manipulation". In December, Linehan evaded the suspension with an account posing as a transgender man. He used the account to call Colm O'Gorman "a traitor to women, gay people and yourself" for signing an open letter published by the Transgender Equality Network of Ireland. The account was banned but Linehan said he had created another.

In February 2021, Linehan created a fake account on the lesbian dating app Her and publicly posted screenshots of non-binary people and trans women using it. The developers of Her clarified that transgender women are welcome on the app. In March 2021, Linehan gave oral evidence to the Communications and Digital Committee of the House of Lords on the subject of freedom of expression online, discussing his Twitter ban.

In an interview in the Irish Independent that month, Linehan ruled out working with Channel 4 again as they would not return the controversial IT Crowd episode to broadcast, and he said he would not work with the BBC as they had depicted a transgender lesbian couple, which Linehan described as "a heterosexual couple", in a CBeebies video. Ahead of the 2022 Australian federal election in May, Linehan used his online platforms to rally international support for the Liberal Party candidate Katherine Deves, who had attracted controversy for anti-trans comments. In September 2022, Linehan said that his anti-transgender activism had led him to question the safety of COVID-19 vaccinations and the scientific consensus on climate change "because I've been lied to so conclusively by all the people I used to trust". In 2022, Linehan wrote articles criticising transgender woman Mridul Wadhwa's appointment as director of the Edinburgh Rape Crisis Centre, and published part of her home address. Wadhwa stated that being doxed by Linehan was "the first time she truly feared for her life".

In interviews in 2022 and 2023, Linehan said the debate over transgender issues had "consumed his life": it had lost him work, made him financially destitute, and ended his marriage. Linehan said the Father Ted musical, on which he had been depending financially, was cancelled when the production company decided his involvement would make it impossible to stage. He had previously called for all people working on the musical to sign a declaration agreeing with some of his views on trans people while describing clashes he was having with colleagues over their views on trans rights, and read out a letter he had written to collaborators saying: "I don't think you all have my back as collaborators or as business partners or as friends. Far from being on the wrong side of history, JK Rowling and I have been proved right over and over again that this is a poisonous ideology that is destroying lives." The journalist Megan Nolan wrote that Linehan "is able to persevere with his campaign because he has convinced himself he is battling the greatest danger currently at play in the world".

Linehan blamed cancel culture for his situation, and said: "Every comedian at the moment is living under a kind of state of permanent blackmail ... There's a few hot-button issues where you have to follow a certain line, and if you don't, you'll be destroyed." In 2023, he denied disliking transgender people, but said using their preferred pronouns was "immoral". He said he did not have a problem with "men calling themselves women" and that "as we keep pointing out, we are only talking about places where conflict arises".

=== Post-Twitter reinstatement ===
Linehan's Twitter account was restored in December 2022, following the takeover of Twitter by Elon Musk, who relaxed many of Twitter's content policies and announced an amnesty to restore suspended accounts. Linehan then attacked Ian "H" Watkins of Steps, tweeting: "What may connect him to a man serving 22 years for raping and torturing a 10-year-old girl?", on the basis that Watkins had used a tool to block transphobes. "H" Watkins should not be confused with Ian Watkins who was serving 22 years in prison for the sexual assault of a child until his death in 2025.

In April 2023, Linehan was again banned from Twitter, following his appearance at an anti-trans event called Let Women Speak in Belfast, Northern Ireland. He had tweeted the words "Durr imm gonna kill em" in response to a Twitter user who referenced counter-protestors at the Belfast event. Linehan's account was reinstated days later.

In July 2023, Linehan tweeted that David Tennant was an "abusive groomer" after Tennant wore a T-shirt saying "Leave Trans Kids Alone You Absolute Freaks". In August, during the Edinburgh Festival Fringe, Linehan and other comedians performed a stand-up comedy show outside the Scottish Parliament after his original venues cancelled his booking over his views. Some supporters of Linehan attended the show and criticised the Edinburgh Fringe as oversensitive. Linehan also threatened to sue the first venue that cancelled his gig. On 1 October, he attended the Conservative Party Conference in Manchester, stating in a speech that he was "the most cancelled person in this room". On 3 October, he said he had been dropped by his television agent, Independent Talent, which also represented Tennant. On 12 November 2023, he appeared on This Week on Ireland's national radio station, RTÉ, to talk about his claim of being cancelled, defend his anti-trans activism, and to promote his memoir Tough Crowd.

=== Legal issues ===
==== Verbal warning about harassment ====
In 2018, Stephanie Hayden, a transgender woman, sued Linehan for harassment. Hayden alleged that Linehan had shared photos on Twitter of Hayden's family and her life before transition, suggested she was a criminal, and repeatedly misgendered and deadnamed her. Linehan in turn alleged that Hayden publicised several private addresses linked to his family to silence him. Police issued Linehan a verbal warning not to contact Hayden.

==== Crowdfunding campaign to respond to defamation claim ====
In August 2024, Scottish actor David Paisley brought a defamation claim against Linehan in the High Court. Paisley alleged several statements about him on Linehan's Substack and social media were defamatory. At a pre-trial hearing, a judge ruled that several publications about Paisley were potentially defamatory. Linehan said he would prove he had not libelled Paisley during the trial and launched a crowdfunding campaign for his defence.

==== Harassment and criminal damage prosecution ====
In April 2025, Linehan was charged with harassment and criminal damage following an incident at the Battle of Ideas conference in London in October 2024. Linehan was charged after posting comments about Sophia Brooks, a 17-year-old transgender activist, calling her a domestic terrorist and a groomer, and throwing her phone on the ground after confronting her in public and asking how many children she had groomed. In May, Linehan pleaded not guilty to both charges at Westminster Magistrates' Court and was released on bail with a condition not to contact Brooks.

Linehan's trial began on 4 September 2025. On 5 September, after having heard evidence over two days, the judge adjourned the trial until 29 October. On 25 November, Judge Clark cleared Linehan of the harassment charge and said she was not certain that Linehan had demonstrated hostility based on Brooks's being transgender. Clark found Linehan guilty of criminal damage to Brooks's phone. She fined Linehan £500 and ordered him to pay court costs of £650 and a statutory surcharge of £200.

On 1 May 2026, the conviction was quashed on appeal. The court stated that, due to the lapse of time between the incident and Brooks taking her phone for repair, it could not be sure that the damage had been caused by Linehan.

==== Arrest for posts on X ====
On 1 September 2025, after arriving at Heathrow Airport from Arizona, Linehan was arrested by armed police on suspicion of inciting violence. He was questioned in relation to three posts on X, including one in which he posted: "If a trans-identified male is in a female-only space, he is committing a violent, abusive act. Make a scene, call the cops and if all else fails, punch him in the balls." He was briefly hospitalised for high blood pressure and then released without charge on police bail. He said his bail condition was that he must not post on X; he said the following week that the bail condition had been dropped. Linehan's arrest was criticised by J. K. Rowling, Elon Musk, and British politicians such as Nigel Farage. On 8 September, Linehan told the BBC he planned to sue the police for wrongful arrest and false imprisonment. On 20 October, Linehan was informed that, following an investigation, he would face no further action. In May 2026, the Metropolitan Police apologised to Linehan for "distress and impact" and later paid him £25,000 in compensation.

The controversy over the arrest prompted widespread debate and calls for a change in the law. The Metropolitan Police announced it would no longer police Non-crime hate incidents and its commissioner, Sir Mark Rowley, said that policing "has been left between a rock and a hard place by successive governments", with officers having little discretion over whether to investigate Linehan's tweets. Rowley also said: "I don't believe we should be policing toxic culture wars debates and officers are currently in an impossible position. I have offered to provide suggestions to the Home Office on where the law and policy should be clarified."

== Political views ==
=== Abortion rights ===
In October 2015, the Linehan and then-wife Helen Serafinowicz worked with Amnesty International on a campaign film calling on the Irish government to repeal the Eighth Amendment of the Constitution, which "acknowledges the right to life of the unborn and, with due regard to the equal right to life of the mother, guarantees in its laws to respect, and, as far as practicable, by its laws to defend and vindicate that right". They revealed their decision for Serafinowicz to abort a foetus with acrania while living in England in 2004, and their discovery that undergoing the procedure in Ireland would have been an offence carrying a maximum 14-year prison sentence.

=== Israel–Palestine ===
Linehan has expressed differing views on the Israel-Palestine conflict over time. In 2018, Linehan praised the New Zealand singer Lorde after she cancelled a planned concert in Israel following a campaign by activists associated with the Boycott, Divestment and Sanctions (BDS) movement. Linehan said Lorde had shown "more guts than some". However, by October 2024, Linehan was among the signatories of an open letter organised by Creative Community for Peace opposing cultural boycotts of Israeli institutions. In October 2026, Linehan described himself on X as "proudly a Zionist".

In May 2026, Linehan criticised the Irish public broadcaster RTÉ after it declined to broadcast the Eurovision Song Contest because of Israel's participation. Ireland, Spain and Slovenia withdrew from participation in the contest for the same reason. RTÉ instead broadcast the Father Ted episode "A Song for Europe", to which Linehan also objected. Linehan said that RTÉ's boycott of the contest was "not a principled humanitarian stand", but "antisemitism — the oldest hatred — dressed up in the language of human rights". RTÉ declined to comment beyond referring to a statement issued in December 2025, in which it said it felt "Ireland's participation remains unconscionable given the appalling loss of lives in Gaza and the humanitarian crisis there which continues to put the lives of so many civilians at risk".

== Personal life ==
Linehan is divorced. He was married to English writer Helen Serafinowicz, the sister of actor Peter Serafinowicz, from 2004 until 2020. Linehan and Serafinowicz have two children and lived in Norwich prior to their separation. Linehan attributed the breakdown of his marriage to the backlash resulting from his anti-transgender activism, saying, “My marriage ended because I refused to stop fighting for the rights of my wife and my daughter.”

According to Linehan, the reaction to his activism resulted in legal and financial problems and visits from the police. He said that Serafinowicz "was justifiably scared. They started to target her. They started to target her family. It just got too much for her."

In 2023, Linehan said he had been on anti-anxiety medication for five or six years since having first received legal threats from trans rights activists. He said he had contemplated suicide in 2020 during the COVID-19 lockdowns, as he had lost work and relationships and was "completely alone". Linehan's friendship with the writer Jon Ronson ended when Ronson did not endorse his position on trans rights; Linehan has attacked Ronson repeatedly on social media. Linehan also wrote that his friendships with the comedians and actors Ardal O'Hanlon, Adam Buxton, Amelia Bullmore and Bill Bailey ended.

Linehan is an active Twitter user, calling it "part of [his] nervous system" in a 2015 interview with The Daily Telegraph. On 13 February 2009, Linehan hosted the first BadMovieClub on Twitter which repeated the next day at midnight, hosted by Phill Jupitus. In August 2009, in response to criticism of the National Health Service by the US Republican Party, Linehan created the #welovetheNHS campaign on Twitter. In 2011, he perpetrated a Twitter hoax that Osama bin Laden was a fan of The IT Crowd.

Linehan is an atheist. In January 2009, he helped to publicise the Atheist Bus Campaign. In 2018, Linehan underwent successful surgery for testicular cancer.

== Credits ==
=== Television writer ===
- The Day Today (2 episodes, "additional material by", 1994)
- Paris (6 episodes, 1994)
- The Fast Show (9 episodes, 1994–1996)
- Father Ted (25 episodes, 1995–1998) (also co-creator, associate producer (one episode))
- Brass Eye (6 episodes, "additional material by", 1997)
- Big Train (12 episodes, 1998) (also co-creator)
- Black Books (6 episodes, 2000) (also co-creator, director)
- The IT Crowd (25 episodes, 2006–2013) (also creator, director, executive producer (series 1 only))
- Count Arthur Strong (20 episodes, 2013–2017) (also creator, director)
- The Walshes (3 episodes, 2013) (also director)
- Motherland (pilot episode, 2016)

=== Television director ===
- Black Books (6 episodes, 2000) (also co-creator, writer)
- Little Britain (1 episode, 2003)
- The IT Crowd (25 episodes, 2006–2013) (also creator, writer)
- The Walshes (3 episodes, 2013) (also writer)
- Count Arthur Strong (20 episodes, 2013–2017) (also creator, writer)
- Motherland (pilot episode, 2016)
- Shrink (3 episodes, 2017)

=== Film director ===
- Hello Friend (short, also co-writer, 2003)

=== Film writer ===
- Never Mind the Horrocks (television film, 1996)
- The Matchmaker (1997)

=== Book writer ===
- Tough Crowd: How I Made and Lost a Career in Comedy (2023 memoir)

== Awards and nominations ==
Year	Nominated for	Award	Category	Result
1996	Father Ted	BAFTAs	Best Comedy (Programme or Series)	Won
1996	Father Ted	Writers' Guild of Great Britain	TV – Situation Comedy	Won
1997	Father Ted	BAFTAs	Best Comedy (Programme or Series)	Nominated
1997	Harry Enfield & Chums	Writers' Guild of Great Britain	TV – Light Entertainment	Won
1999	Big Train	BAFTAs	Best Light Entertainment (Programme or Series)	Nominated
1999	Father Ted	BAFTAs	Best Comedy (Programme or Series)	Won
2001	Black Books	BAFTAs	Situation Comedy Award	Won
2007	The IT Crowd	BAFTAs	Best Situation Comedy	Nominated
2008	The IT Crowd	BAFTAs	Best Situation Comedy	Nominated
2009	The IT Crowd	BAFTAs	Best Situation Comedy	Won
2009	The IT Crowd	IFTAs	Best Script for Television	Won
2014	The IT Crowd	BAFTAs Television Craft	Writer Comedy	Won
2014	Count Arthur Strong	BAFTAs Television Craft	Writer Comedy	Nominated
