= Quite Interesting Limited =

British research company

- Company type: Private company limited by shares
- Industry: Research
- Founded: October 27, 1999; 26 years ago in London, England
- Founder: John Lloyd
- Headquarters: Lynton House, 7-12 Tavistock Square, London, WC1H 9BQ
- Area served: Europe; United States
- Key people: John Lloyd; John Mitchinson
- Products: DVDs; Books
- Owner: John Lloyd
- Website: qi.com

Quite Interesting Limited is a British research company, most notable for providing the research for the British television panel game QI (itself an abbreviation of Quite Interesting) and the Swedish version Intresseklubben, as well as other QI–related programmes and products. The company founder and chairman is John Lloyd, the creator and producer of QI, and host of the radio panel game The Museum of Curiosity, which also uses Quite Interesting Limited for its research. John Mitchinson is the company's director and also works as head of research for QI.

== About ==
Lloyd founded Quite Interesting Limited in 1999. It is claimed that the idea of founding the company came on Christmas Eve 1993. According to his profile on QI.com, "he came to the sudden and alarming realisation that he didn't really know anything. Changing gear again, he started reading books for the first time since he was 17. To his horror, he discovered that he hadn't been paying attention and, with painful slowness, unearthed the closely guarded secret that the universe is astoundingly quite interesting."

The philosophy of the company is that it claims that there are four primal drives: food, sex, shelter and curiosity. Out of these, curiosity is supposedly the most important because, "unlike the other three drives, it is what makes us uniquely human." The company claims that, "Whatever is interesting we are interested in. Whatever is not interesting, we are even more interested in. Everything is interesting if looked at in the right way."

Those who carry out research are known as the "QI Elves". Notable elves include Justin Pollard and Vitali Vitaliev. They are also responsible for helping to write the questions used on QI. People wishing to become elves are recommended to start by commenting on the forums of the QI website.

== Products ==
=== DVDs ===
Name	Region 2 release
QI: A Quite Interesting Game	2004-11-04
QI: The Complete First Series	2006-11-06
QI Presents: Strictly Come Duncing	2007-11-26
QI: The B Series	2008-03-17
QI: The C Series	2008-09-01
QI: The Complete A to D	2017-05-08
QI: The Complete E to G	2017-05-08
QI: The Complete H to J	2017-10-23
QI: The Complete K to M	2017-10-23

=== Books ===
Name	Released	ISBN
The Book of General Ignorance	2006-10-05	ISBN 0-571-23368-6
The Second Book of General Ignorance	2010	ISBN 978-0-307-95174-8
The Book of Animal Ignorance	2007-10-04	ISBN 0-571-23370-8
The QI Annual 2008	2007-11-01	ISBN 0-571-23779-7
