= Ted Dewan =

American-British cartoonist and children's illustrator

Ted Dewan is an American-born British writer and illustrator of children's books who resides in England. He is best known as the creator of the award-winning book series Bing, now adapted into an animated television series.

== Life ==
Dewan was born in Boston and raised in Lexington, Massachusetts, the first son of physicist Dr Edmond M Dewan and scholar/attorney Karen Dean-Smith. He grew up with his brother, musician and artist Brian Dewan and both brothers had musical and artistic aspirations from a young age. He studied engineering and electronic music at Brown University, Rhode Island where he studied with his mentor, author/illustrator David Macaulay, before working for five years as a Physics teacher at Milton Academy. As well as his science-teaching duties at Milton Academy, Dewan directed various musical shows including a touring satirical student pop band.

He relocated to London where he began to make a living as a full-time illustrator and cartoonist, drawing for British newspapers including The Times (and Times Educational Supplement), The Guardian, The Independent and The Daily Telegraph. In his spare time, he performed a solo accordion act on London's comedy circuit, to mixed and "misunderstood" reviews at such venues as The Comedy Store and the Hackney Empire. Within a few years of moving to London, he met Helen Cooper, another children's illustrator and writer. They have one daughter.

Dewan and Cooper moved from London to Oxford, where Dewan worked closely with David Fickling Books, the original publisher of the Bing books. His move to Oxford also saw the beginning of an eight-year pilot project to transform his residential street in the UK's only DIY redesign project designed and built entirely by its residents with guidance and funding from Bristol-based Sustrans. He was given stewardship of the writer's shed from Oxford-based author Philip Pullman in 2002, with a covenant agreed that only creative work shall take place in it, and that the shed was to be passed on freely to another maker when the time came. The shed has now been passed on and its story continues.

Divorced in 2018, Dewan remarried in 2023 to Kadra Ibrahim and now lives and works in South London.

== Books ==
Dewan began his career with science-writer Steve Parker on a number of children's non-fiction books. Dewan's pen and ink and watercolor artwork complemented "Parker's examination of the morphology of the world's largest mammals" (and also Inside dinosaurs and other prehistoric creatures). For Inside the Whale and Other Animals he won the 1992 Mother Goose Award from Books for Children as "the most exciting newcomer to British children's book illustration". Concurrently he illustrated a couple of adult non-fiction books by Dr. Robert Ornstein.

Dewan next turned his hand to writing as well as illustrating, producing in 1994 a baseball version of The Three Billy Goats Gruff. A number of other solo writing/illustrating projects have followed since, in particular the Bing Bunny series, which has been adapted into a TV series.

The first of three Crispin picture books won the Blue Peter Award, and was a runner-up for the 2000 Kate Greenaway Medal from the Library Association, recognising the year's best children's book illustration by a British subject. (Note: Since 1995 there are usually eight books on the Greenaway shortlist. According to CCSU, some runners-up through 2002 were Commended (from 1959) or Highly Commended (from 1974). There were 99 commendations of both kinds in 44 years including Anthony Browne's high commendation and Dewan's commendation for 2000.) Cooper had won the 1996 and 1998 Medals.

More recently, his illustration work has featured in books related to the BBC comedy panel game television quiz show QI. In particular, he contributed "400 diagrams and cartoons" to The Book of Animal Ignorance, and various illustrations to The QI "E" Annual (or The QI Annual 2007), both published by Faber and Faber in 2007.

His latest picture book with Orchard Books is about a courageous teddy bear charged with warming the heart of a troublesome boy. One True Bear (2009) was noted for its daring inclusion of actual young boys' drawings, including the "violent" ones not normally reproduced, especially in young children's literature.

== Television ==
In 2014 a television series called Bing based on his books began broadcast on CBeebies, produced by Acamar Films and animated by Brown Bag Films. He co-developed the series, co-wrote the pilot, and wrote or contributed to most of the scripts, while working with the animators on set and character design. The series has since become one of the most viewed programmes for children across the whole BBC, winning a BAFTA nomination and an International Emmy Award. The series features the voice talent of Oscar-winning actor, Mark Rylance.

Dewan is currently developing another television animation project for children and has acted as consultant on other television projects.

== 3D artwork and machines ==
Dewan began his commissioned three-dimensional artwork, including 2004's Cyclemas Tree, a 20-foot 1.5 tonne illuminated Christmas Tree made of derelict bicycles and scaffolding. In 2007, he was appointed lead artist for Oxford's Millennial celebration's extravaganza, Luminox, which featured his 70-foot bamboo spire pendulum sculpture with a flaming pendulum bob. The sculpture formed the centrepiece of a large-scale fire installation by the renowned French group Carabosse. He is the creator of the Storyloom at Oxford's Story Museum, which remained from the 2012 steampunk The Fabulous Account of Rochester's Extraordinary Storyloom before its removal and reassembly in Dewan’s London home studio.

His most recent commission was a sculpture and photography/design featured on the cover of Philip Selway's (Radiohead) second solo album, The Weatherhouse.

== Awards and honors ==
Winner

1992, Mother Goose Award, best new illustrator, for Inside the Whale and Other Animals, written by Steve Parker

2002, Blue Peter Book Award

Best Book to Read Aloud, the picture book Crispin, the Pig Who Had It All

2015, BAFTA nomination, "Bing"

2016, International Emmy Award, "Bing"

2016, Writers' Guild of Great Britain, team scriptwriter "Bing"

Runners-up, shortlists

1992, shortlisted for the TES information book award for his illustration of Inside the Whale & Other Animals, written by Steve Parker.

1997, shortlisted for Kurt Maschler Award, integrated writing and illustration, The Sorcerer's Apprentice, and named one of the Young Book Trust 100 Best Books

2002, commended runner-up for the Kate Greenaway Medal, Crispin the Pig Who Had It All

2004, named one of the Publishers Weekly Books of the Year, the Bing Bunny series of books for toddlers

== Works ==
=== As writer and illustrator ===
- 3 Billy Goats Gruff (André Deutsch, 1994)
- Top Secret (André Deutsch/Scholastic 1996)
- The Sorcerer's Apprentice (Corgi/Transworld 1997)

The Sorcerer's Apprentice and Music of Magic and Electricity (Corgi Audio Tape, 1997)

- The Weatherbirds (Puffin Books/Penguin, 1999)
- Crispin, the Pig Who Had It All (Transworld, 2000)
- Baby Gets the Zapper (Transworld, 2001)
- Crispin and the 3 Little Piglets (Transworld, 2002)
- Crispin and the Best Birthday Surprise Ever (Transworld, 2007)
- One True Bear (London:Orchard and New York:Walker/Bloomsbury, 2009)

==== Bing Bunny ====
- Bing Bunny: Bing Get Dressed (David Fickling Books, 2003)
- Bing Bunny: Bing Paint Day (Fickling, 2003)
- Bing Bunny: Bing Bed Time (Fickling, 2003)
- Bing Bunny: Bing Something for Daddy (Fickling, 2003)
- Bing Bunny: Bing Go Picnic (Fickling, 2004)
- Bing Bunny: Bing Make Music (Fickling, 2004)
- Bing Bunny: Bing Swing (Fickling, 2004)
- Bing Bunny: Bing Milkshake (Fickling, 2004)
- Bing Bunny: Bing Yuk (Fickling, 2004)

=== As illustrator ===
==== Children's non-fiction ====
- Inside the Whale and Other Animals (Dorling Kindersley/Doubleday, 1992), written by Dewan and Steve Parker
- Inside Dinosaurs and Other Prehistoric Animals (Kindersley, 1993), Dewan and Parker

==== Children's fiction ====
- Rumpelstiltskin (Scholastic, 1998), written by Kit Wright
- Sandmare (Corgi/Transworld, 2001), Helen Cooper
- The Divide (Chicken House, 2005), Elizabeth Kay
- The Ice Cream Swipe (Oxford University Press, 2003), Elizabeth Laird
- Back to the Divide (Scholastic, 2007), Elizabeth Kay
- Jinx on the Divide (Scholastic, 2007), Elizabeth Kay
- The Thomas Trew Series (Hodder & Stoughton, 2006–2008), Sophie Masson
  - Book 1: Thomas Trew and the Hidden People HB (2006); PB (2007)
  - Book 2: Thomas Trew and the Horns of Pan PB (2007)
  - Book 3: Thomas Trew and the Klint-King's Gold PB (2007)
  - Book 4: Thomas Trew and the Selkie's Curse PB (2007)
  - Book 5: Thomas Trew and the Flying Huntsman PB (2007)
  - Book 6: Thomas Trew and the Island of Ghosts PB (2008)
- A Midsummer Night's Dream (Hodder & Stoughton, 2006), the 1590s Shakespeare classic retold by Beverly Birch

==== Adult non-fiction ====
- The Evolution of Consciousness (Prentice-Hall, US 1991), written by Dr. Robert Ornstein,
- The Roots of the Self (HarperCollins, US 1993), by Ornstein
- The Axemaker's Gift (G. P. Putnam's Sons, US 1995), James Burke and Ornstein
- Wild Minds (Henry Holt, New York 1999), Marc Hauser
- The Book of Animal Ignorance (Faber and Faber, UK Oct 2007) (ISBN 978-0-571-23370-0), John Lloyd and John Mitchinson, designed and illus. by Dewan
- The QI "E" Annual (alternate title, The QI Annual 2007) (Faber and Faber, UK Nov 2007), by the QI Elves with some illustrations by Dewan
- The QI "F" Annual (alt. title, The QI Annual 2008) (Faber and Faber, UK Nov 2008), by the QI Elves, some illus. by Dewan
- Mindreal (Malor Books, US 2008), Ornstein
