= Quite Interesting =

Quite Interesting may refer to:

- QI (short for Quite Interesting), a BBC comedy panel game featuring Sandi Toksvig and Alan Davies
- Quite Interesting Limited, the company that provides the research used on QI, The Museum of Curiosity and related works
