= Tsutomu Yamaguchi =

Japanese atomic bombing survivor

- 山口 彊
- Tsutomu Yamaguchi in 2009
- Born: 16 March 1916; Nagasaki, Empire of Japan
- Died: 4 January 2010 (aged 93); Nagasaki, Japan
- Occupation: Engineer
- Employer: Mitsubishi Heavy Industries
- Known for: Hibakusha of both the atomic bombings of Hiroshima and Nagasaki
- Movement: Nuclear disarmament
- Spouse: Hisako (died 2008)
- Children: 3

Tsutomu Yamaguchi (Japanese: 山口 彊, romanized: Yamaguchi Tsutomu; 16 March 1916 – 4 January 2010) was a Japanese marine engineer who survived and witnessed both the Hiroshima and Nagasaki atomic bombings during World War II. Although at least 160 people are known to have been affected by both bombings, he is the only person to have been officially recognized by the government of Japan as surviving both explosions.

A resident of Nagasaki, Yamaguchi was in Hiroshima on business for his employer Mitsubishi Heavy Industries when the city was bombed at 8:15 AM, on 6 August 1945. He returned to Nagasaki the following day and, despite his wounds, returned to work on 9 August, the day of the second atomic bombing. That morning, while he was being told by his supervisor that he was "crazy" after describing how one bomb had destroyed the city, the Nagasaki bomb detonated. In 1957, he was recognized as a hibakusha ("explosion-affected person") of the Nagasaki bombing, but was not officially recognized as a survivor of Hiroshima by the Japanese government until 24 March 2009. He died of stomach cancer on 4 January 2010, at the age of 93.

== Early life ==
Yamaguchi was born on 16 March 1916 in Nagasaki. He joined Mitsubishi Heavy Industries in the 1930s and worked as a draftsman designing oil tankers.

== Second World War ==
Yamaguchi said he "never thought Japan should start a war". He continued his work with Mitsubishi Heavy Industries, but soon Japanese industry began to suffer heavily as resources became scarce and tankers were sunk. As the war dragged on, he was so despondent over the state of the country that he considered honor killing his family with an overdose of sleeping pills in the event that Japan lost.

=== Hiroshima bombing ===
Yamaguchi lived and worked in Nagasaki, but in the summer of 1945 he was in Hiroshima for a three-month-long business trip. On 6 August, he was preparing to leave the city with two colleagues, Akira Iwanaga and Kuniyoshi Sato, and was on his way to the train station when he realized he had forgotten his hanko (a type of identification stamp common in Japan) and returned to his workplace to get it. At 8:15 a.m., he was walking towards the docks when the American B-29 bomber Enola Gay dropped the Little Boy atomic bomb near the centre of the city, only 3 kilometres (1.9 mi) away. Yamaguchi recalls seeing the bomber and two small parachutes, before there was "a great flash in the sky, and I was blown over". The explosion ruptured his eardrums, blinded him temporarily, and left him with serious burns over the left side of the top half of his body. After recovering, he crawled to a shelter and, having rested, he set out to find his colleagues. They had also survived and together they spent the night in an air-raid shelter before returning to Nagasaki the following day. In Nagasaki, he received treatment for his wounds and, despite being heavily bandaged, he reported for work on 9 August.

=== Nagasaki bombing ===
At 11:00 a.m. on 9 August 1945, Yamaguchi was describing the blast in Hiroshima to his supervisor, when the American bomber Bockscar dropped the Fat Man atomic bomb over the city. His workplace again put him 3 kilometres (1.9 mi) from ground zero, but this time he was unhurt by the explosion. However, he was unable to replace his now-ruined bandages and he suffered from a high fever and continuous vomiting for over a week.

== Later life ==
During the Allied occupation of Japan, Yamaguchi worked as a translator for the occupation forces. In the early 1950s, he and his wife, who was also a survivor of the Nagasaki atomic bombing, had two daughters. He later returned to work for Mitsubishi designing oil tankers. When the Japanese government officially recognized atomic bombing survivors as hibakusha in 1957, Yamaguchi's identification stated only that he had been present at Nagasaki. He was content with this, satisfied that he was relatively healthy, and put the experiences behind him.

As he grew older, his opinions about the use of atomic weapons began to change. In his eighties, he wrote a book about his experiences, Ikasareteiru inochi (A Life Well-Lived), as well as a book of poetry, and was invited to take part in a 2006 documentary about 165 double A-bomb survivors (known as nijū hibakusha in Japan) called Twice Survived: The Doubly Atomic Bombed of Hiroshima and Nagasaki, which was screened at the United Nations. At the screening, he pleaded for the abolition of atomic weapons.

Yamaguchi became a vocal proponent of nuclear disarmament. He told an interviewer, "The reason that I hate the atomic bomb is because of what it does to the dignity of human beings." Speaking through his daughter during a telephone interview, he said, "I can't understand why the world cannot understand the agony of the nuclear bombs. How can they keep developing these weapons?"

On 22 December 2009, Canadian film director James Cameron and author Charles Pellegrino met Yamaguchi while he was in a hospital in Nagasaki and discussed the idea of making a film about nuclear weapons. "I think it's Cameron's and Pellegrino's destiny to make a film about nuclear weapons", Yamaguchi said.

=== Recognition by government ===
At first, Yamaguchi did not feel the need to draw attention to his double-survivor status. However, in later life he began to consider his survival as destiny, so in January 2009, he applied for double recognition. This was accepted by the Japanese government in March 2009, making Yamaguchi the only person officially recognized as a survivor of both bombings. Speaking of the recognition, he said, "My double radiation exposure is now an official government record. It can tell the younger generation the horrifying history of the atomic bombings even after I die".

== Personal life ==
Yamaguchi was married to his wife Hisako (1920–2008), and had three children. Their children, all of whom experienced serious health problems throughout their lives, were his son Katsutoshi (1946–2005), and daughters Toshiko (born 1948/1949) and Naoko. Yamaguchi's wife, also a survivor of the atomic bombing of Nagasaki, died in 2008 at the age of eighty-eight; her cause of death was liver and kidney cancer, likely related to health complications from the atomic bombing that she had experienced her entire life. At the time of her death, Yamaguchi was living with his daughter Toshiko in Nagasaki.

=== Health ===
Yamaguchi lost hearing in his left ear as a result of the Hiroshima explosion. He also went bald temporarily and his daughter recalls that until she was the age of 12 Yamaguchi was constantly wrapped in bandages. (Note: Toshiko Yamaguchi was 60 in March 2009 and would have been 12 in 1960 or 1961.) Despite this, Yamaguchi went on to lead a healthy life. Later in life, he began to suffer from radiation-related ailments, including cataracts and acute leukemia.

His wife also suffered radiation poisoning from black rain exposure after the Nagasaki explosion and died in 2008 at the age of eighty-eight of kidney and liver cancer. All three of their children reported suffering from health problems, which they blamed on their parents' exposures to radiation.

== Death ==
In 2009, Yamaguchi learned that he was dying of stomach cancer. He died on 4 January 2010, in Nagasaki at the age of 93.

== BBC controversy ==
On 17 December 2010, the BBC featured Yamaguchi in its comedy programme QI, referring to him as "The Unluckiest Man in the World". Both Stephen Fry, the host of QI, and celebrity guests drew laughter from the audience in a segment that included examples of black humor such as asking if the bomb had "landed on him and bounced off". A clip from the episode was uploaded by the BBC after the show but was later deleted. A BBC spokesperson told Kyodo News, "We instructed our crew to delete the file since we have already issued a statement that the content was not appropriate".

The episode triggered criticism in Japan. Toshiko Yamasaki, Yamaguchi's daughter, appeared on NHK's national evening news and said: "I cannot forgive the atomic bomb experience being laughed at in Britain, which has nuclear weapons of its own. I think this shows that the horror of atomic bomb is not well enough understood in the world. I feel sad rather than angry".

The Japanese Embassy, London, wrote to the BBC protesting that the programme insulted the deceased victims of the atomic bomb. It was reported that Piers Fletcher, a producer of the programme, responded to complaints with "we greatly regret it when we cause offence" and "it is apparent to me that I underestimated the potential sensitivity of this issue to Japanese viewers".

On 22 January 2011, the BBC and Talkback Thames jointly issued a statement. In addition to the joint statement, the BBC delivered a letter from Mark Thompson, Director-General of the BBC, to the Japanese Embassy.

== See also ==
- Effects of nuclear explosions
- Effects of nuclear explosions on human health
- Jacob Beser, the only member of the strike crews for both Hiroshima and Nagasaki
