= 1,227 QI Facts to Blow Your Socks Off =

Book by John Lloyd

1,227 QI Facts To Blow Your Socks Off
- The original UK cover.
- Author: John Lloyd; John Mitchinson; James Harkin
- Language: English
- Subject: Trivia
- Publisher: Faber and Faber (UK) W. W. Norton & Company (US)
- Publication date: 1 November 2012 (UK) 9 September 2013 (US)
- Publication place: United Kingdom
- Media type: Hardback
- Pages: 322
- ISBN: 978-0-571-29791-7
- Preceded by: The Second Book of General Ignorance

1,227 QI Facts To Blow Your Socks Off is the sixth in a series of books based on the intellectual British panel game QI, written by series-creator John Lloyd, director of research John Mitchinson, and chief researcher James Harkin. Published on 1 November 2012 (9 September 2013 in the US), it is a trivia book containing 1,227 facts collected during the making of the series, which had been ten years in the making at the time of publication.

== Publication history ==
Lloyd said in an interview with The Daily Telegraph: "This book is like a set of haiku. I think it's the best thing we've ever done. It has purity and simplicity."

== Structure ==
The book contains lists of facts, normally four per page. All the sources for the facts are listed online on the QI website. Other than Lloyd, Mitchinson and Harkin, credit for authorship is also given to QI researchers (also known as "Elves") Anne Miller, Andy Murray and Alex Bell.

The reason for the number of facts being 1,227, according to Lloyd and Mitchinson, was that they had originally planned to have 1,000 facts and when they wrote down the list containing all the facts that would go in the book, they discovered that they had gone past the number, to 1,227.
