= The Second Book of General Ignorance =

- The original UK cover.
- Author: John Lloyd; John Mitchinson
- Illustrator: The UK cover.
- Language: English
- Subject: Trivia
- Publisher: Faber and Faber
- Publication date: 7 October 2010
- Publication place: United Kingdom
- Media type: Hardback
- Pages: 342
- ISBN: 978-0-571-26965-5
- Preceded by: The QI Book of the Dead
- Followed by: 1,227 QI Facts To Blow Your Socks Off

The Second Book of General Ignorance is the fifth in a series of books based on the final round in the intellectual British panel game QI, written by series-creator John Lloyd and head-researcher John Mitchinson. It is the second book to be based on the show's final round "General Ignorance", the first being The Book of General Ignorance first published in 2006. Like the original book, it is a trivia book aiming to address and correct the comprehensive and humiliating catalogue of all the misconceptions, mistakes and misunderstandings in 'common knowledge' — it is therefore known not as a 'General Knowledge' book, but as 'General Ignorance'. A second, expanded edition called The Discreetly Plumper Second QI Book of General Ignorance was released on 4 October 2012.

== Publication history ==
The original Book of General Ignorance was first published in the UK on 4 October 2006. The book became a hit, becoming an Amazon bestseller in Christmas 2006, selling more copies in the last quarter of the year than any other book. The Book of General Ignorance became the fourth bestselling book in the history of Amazon.

Following the success of the original book, a new, larger paperback edition of the book was published, entitled The Noticeably Stouter Edition in Christmas Day 2008 to celebrate the TV series moving from BBC Two to BBC One, and an audiobook edition entitle The Sound of General Ignorance read by Lloyd and Mitchinson was released on 1 October 2008. The Book of General Ignorance has been translated into 26 languages and has sold over 1.2 million copies. The Second Book of General Ignorance, a sequel to the original was first published on 7 October 2010. A hardback version of The Noticeably Stouter Edition was published on the same day.

== Structure ==
Like the first Book of General Ignorance, The Second Book of General Ignorance contains a list of questions, most of which previously appeared in episodes of QI. Each question explains the correct answer, and usually attempts to show why people tend to make the wrong assumptions, or believe certain urban myths. The book also features an introduction entitled "Forethought" written by the host of the TV series Stephen Fry.
