= Advanced Banter =

2008 book

- The UK cover.
- Author: John Lloyd; John Mitchinson
- Illustrator: Cover illustration by Piers Sanford
- Language: English
- Subject: Quotations/Trivia
- Publisher: Faber and Faber
- Publication date: 1 October 2008
- Publication place: United Kingdom
- Media type: Hardback
- Pages: 428
- ISBN: 978-0-571-23372-4
- Preceded by: The Book of Animal Ignorance
- Followed by: The QI Book of the Dead

Advanced Banter: The QI Book of Quotations, known as If Ignorance Is Bliss, Why Aren't There More Happy People? in the United States, is the third title in a series of books based on the intellectual British panel game QI, written by series-creator John Lloyd and head-researcher John Mitchinson. It is a book of "quite interesting" quotations.

== Publication history ==
Advanced Banter was first published by Faber in hardback on 1 October 2008. A paperback version of Advanced Banter was published on 5 November 2009. The book was released in the United States under the title If Ignorance Is Bliss, Why Aren't There More Happy People? on 4 August 2009.

== Structure ==
Of the previous QI books, the structure is akin to the second book, The Book of Animal Ignorance, which is an encyclopaedic listing of 100 animals, compared to the first book, The Book of General Ignorance, which was written in a question and answer format. Advanced Banter contains a series of quotes which are divided into over 400 separate topics, such as "Acting", "Action" and "Adventure", which are listed alphabetically. However, there are no topics under the letter "X". As with the two previous books, there are also contributions by two television stars of QI: host Stephen Fry and panellist Alan Davies. Fry writes an introduction entitled "Prologue", while Davies writes a section called "Proverb", which contains a proverb which he himself has written: "A small pie is soon eaten."

== Reception ==
Boyd Tonkin in The Independent wrote of Lloyd and Mitchinson: "They prove in spades that the distinction between reference and entertainment has collapsed, with no exact sources given and a preface that styles the book as a 'manifesto' for pithy wit rather than a monument of scholarship. For all that, Lloyd and Mitchinson – the Two Horsemen of the Apocryphal, maybe – manage on every page an Oxford- and Chambers-beating ratio of gems to duds when it comes to imperishable one-liners. Quotation of the year for 2008? Thomas Jefferson on high finance: 'I believe that banking institutions are more dangerous to our liberties than standing armies.' Give that man an overdraft."
