= The Divide trilogy =

Series of novels by Elizabeth Kay

The Divide trilogy is a fantasy young adult novel trilogy by Elizabeth Kay, which takes place in an alternate universe. The three books are The Divide (2002), Back to The Divide (2005), and Jinx on The Divide (2006). The first novel was originally published by the small press publisher Chicken House (now a division of Scholastic), with subsequent volumes published by Scholastic, which also reprinted the first novel. The books have been translated into French, German, Spanish, Finnish, Chinese, Japanese, Portuguese, Italian, Romanian and Dutch. Interior illustrations are by Ted Dewan.

== The Divide ==
=== Plot summary ===
A thirteen-year-old boy, Felix Sanders, has a life-threatening heart condition. While his family is vacationing in Costa Rica at a place called the Divide, the point where water flows to both the Pacific and Atlantic oceans, he passes out and he finds himself in an alternate world, where the Earth's mythical creatures are real and humans are a legend. He sets off on a journey with a resident of this world, Betony, a tangle-child (elf) who later becomes his lifelong best friend, to cure his illness and get home. Felix and Betony's siblings, Tansy and Ramson, tangle with a cunning japegrin (pixie) named Snakeweed, who markets his company called Global Panaceas, an unscrupulous potions business. Snakeweed captures Ramson and Felix with the help of his sinistroms (devil-hyenas) Architrex and Vomidor to get information, but unable to extract anything useful, throws them both in jail. The two children escape and reunite with Betony. Along with Betony and a brazzle (griffin) named Ironclaw, Felix travels to the seaside town of Andria in order to find Ironclaw's mate, Thornbeak, who works as a historian and might be able to produce a cure for his illness. Snakeweed, who also ventured there for publicity, is torn apart by newspapers (introduced into this world by Felix) and Betony's annoying classmate Agrimony (hired as eye candy). Just in time, Thornbeak discovers Felix's cure, a spell combined with one of her own feathers, and saves him from the brink of death, telling him the cure will be permanent. Felix and his new friends travel back to the original Divide he woke up on, but are intercepted by Snakeweed and Architrex, who force Ironclaw to use the spell he calculated to send them all to Felix's world. Architrex is shot and killed by hunters, Snakeweed is not seen again, and Felix reunites with his parents, who are shocked to find him cured.

== Back to the Divide ==
=== Plot summary ===
One year later, Snakeweed wants to return home, but in order to do so, he needs the Divide spell hidden in Felix's notebook. In order to obtain the spell, Snakeweed turns Felix's parents into marble. The curse spreads to any living creature that touches them, and Felix must head back across the Divide to find the countercharm and save the Earth. However, he is deeply unsettled to find a new president, Fleabane, threatening to burn down the library and everyone inside, including Betony and Thornbeak. Felix rashly sets off to save them himself, at the same time as Ironclaw, who finds himself plied for the spell by two of Fleabane's thugs. By sheer bad luck, Ironclaw arrives to interrupt Betony and Thornbeak's attempt to neutralize the incendiary spell over the library, accidentally resurrecting a long-dead sinistrom named Harshak. After making it back to Betony's treehouse, her talking plant tells Felix of a riddle-paw (sphinx) named Leona, whom Felix is sure can neutralize the marble spell. After a difficult journey across the desert in which the two children are separated from Ironclaw and Thornbeak, they reunite and find Leona at the rock-cut city of Sebeth. After successfully obtaining the countercharm Felix needs and nearing home, the group are sidetracked yet again by Snakeweed, who attempts to steal Ironclaw's gold. Surrounded by beings with a grudge against him, Snakeweed snatches the brazzles' newborn chick, Fuzzy, and holds her hostage. She is rescued by Felix and a carrionwing (harpy) who helps him save the king and queen, who have been under a sleeping spell in a reproduction of Sleeping Beauty. In a dramatic turn of events, Snakeweed ends up under the spell himself and Felix's group are free to carry on.

In the meantime, two scientists named Rutherford Tripp and Emily Parsons become interested in Snakeweed's spell, mistaking it for a new pesticide at first, but soon, prompted by curiosity, invade Felix's yard and discover all kinds of things the secrets in Felix's notebooks (which he used to document everything in the other world) might be capable of. Felix and Betony return to his world only to find his parents and all manner of petrified animals stolen. Betony uses a directional spell to find them and they free Felix's parents and everything else affected by the curse, dealing with the two scientists along the way. Felix and Betony part ways once again, Felix and his father swearing to keep the incident secret from his mother, and Felix returns to his house to enjoy the rest of his summer.

== Jinx on the Divide ==
=== Plot summary ===
A bully, Rhino, at Felix's school accidentally releases a brandee (djinn/genie) from a lamp Felix accidentally obtained from across the Divide. The djinn demands to be returned home and to be given a solid form. Felix and Betony (who is spending Christmas with Felix across the Divide with Nimblenap, Betony's flying carpet), return to that world. Meanwhile, inside the lamp, Rhino has found a box that will grant him any of his desires, in exchange for hearing Rhino say the magic words that could destroy both worlds.
