= The QI Book of the Dead =

- The UK cover.
- Author: John Lloyd; John Mitchinson
- Language: English
- Subject: Obituaries/Trivia
- Publisher: Faber and Faber
- Publication date: 5 November 2009
- Publication place: United Kingdom
- Media type: Hardback
- Pages: 435
- ISBN: 978-0-571-24490-4
- Preceded by: Advanced Banter
- Followed by: The Second Book of General Ignorance

The QI Book of the Dead (sold as The Book of the Dead in the United States) is the fourth title in a series of books based on the intellectual British panel game QI, written by series-creator John Lloyd and head-researcher John Mitchinson. It is a book of "quite interesting" obituaries.

== Publication history ==
The QI Book of the Dead was first published by Faber and Faber in hardback on 5 November 2009. The idea of the book originated before the television series QI was broadcast. Mitchinson wrote in an article for the Daily Telegraph newspaper that, "It first appeared on one of our "how to make life more interesting" lists at a time when Stephen Fry's erudite put-downs and the anteater impressions of Alan Davies weren't even gleams in Lloyd's eye."

== Structure ==
The book is divided into 10 chapters, covering 68 different people. However, instead of dividing the chapters into subjects normally found in such books, like "Royalty", "Scientists" and "Sportsmen", The QI Book of the Dead uses "more diverting categories". Examples include "There's Nothing Like a Bad Start in Life", covering people who had bad childhoods; "Man Cannot Live by Bread Alone", about people with unusual diets; and "Is That All There Is?" about people interested in life after death.

== Reception ==
Ian Wolf for the British Comedy Guide was mostly positive with his review, saying: "The QI Book of the Dead is definitely an enjoyable read, and makes for a great gift idea. For one thing, it allows us to look back and learn on the mistakes of our ancestors. Amongst those ancestors are Confucius and Nefertiti, whom everyone in the world is related to... interesting, isn't it!"

However, Wolf also wrote that the book made mistakes. He wrote that the book wrongly claimed that Lord Shelburne was Prime Minister, when in fact he was First Lord of the Treasury, with the title of "Prime Minister" not being used to describe the leader of the British government until a century after Shelburne died by Henry Campbell-Bannerman.

== Obituaries ==
The people covered in The QI Book of the Dead are as follows.

Chapter	Title	Subject	People
1	There's Nothing like a Bad Start in Life	People with unhappy childhoods	Leonardo da Vinci; Sigmund Freud; Isaac Newton; Oliver Heaviside; Lord Byron; Ada Lovelace; Hans Christian Andersen; Salvador Dalí
2	Happy-go-lucky	People who were always happy	Epicurus; Benjamin Franklin; Edward Jenner; Mary Seacole; Moll Cutpurse; Richard Feynman
3	Driven	The highly motivated	Genghis Khan; Robert Peary; Mary Kingsley; Alexander von Humboldt; Francis Galton; William Morris
4	Let's Do It	The sex mad	Giacomo Casanova; Catherine the Great; Cora Pearl; H. G. Wells; Colette; Marie Bonaparte; Alfred Kinsey; Tallulah Bankhead
5	Man Cannot Live by Bread Alone	People with strange diets	Helena, comtesse de Noailles; George Fordyce; Elizabeth, Empress of Austria; John Harvey Kellog; Henry Ford; George Washington Carver; Howard Hughes
6	Grin and Bear It	The pain ridden and disabled	Pieter Stuyvesant; General Antonio de Santa Anna; Daniel Lambert; Florence Nightingale; Fernando Pessoa; Dawn Langley Simmons
7	The Monkey-Keepers	People who kept pet monkeys	Oliver Cromwell; Catherine de Medici; Sir Jeffrey Hudson; Rembrandt van Rijn; Frida Kahlo; Madame Mao; Francis Buckland; King Alexander of Greece
8	Who Do You Think You Are?	Impostors	Titus Oates; Count Cagliostro; George Psalmanazar; Princess Caraboo; Louis de Rougemont; James Barry; Ignácz Trebitsch Lincoln; Tuesday Lobsang Rampa; Archibald Belaney
9	Once You're Dead, You're Made for Life	People who died penniless	Emma, Lady Hamilton; John Dee; Jack Parsons; Nikola Tesla; Karl Marx
10	Is That All There Is?	People interested in life after death	St. Cuthbert; Ann Lee; William Blake; Jeremy Bentham; Buckminster Fuller
