= Piers Fletcher =

Piers Fletcher is a British television producer and researcher, mainly working for the BBC panel game QI.

Before working in television, Fletcher served in the British Army, where he was in charge of the northernmost Observation Post in Hong Kong, meaning that if China invaded, he would have been one of the first soldiers to have faced them. After leaving the army he went to study at Balliol College, Oxford, and then left to become a commodity broker in the City of London specialising in potato futures, where he worked for twenty-two years.

Fletcher then left his job and began working for QI, where he became one of the show's "Question Wranglers" at the beginning of the second series, where he was involved in writing the questions. He was also given the post of "Health and safety, retractions and compliances officer", which involves dealing with complaints from viewers over questions, answers or statements that were broadcast which may be wrong. By the sixth series of QI, Fletcher, or "Flash" as he is nicknamed by the rest of the QI crew, was given the post of producer, taking over from the original producer and creator of QI, John Lloyd.
