= Ian Lorimer =

British television director

Ian Lorimer is a television director, most noted for being the director for the British panel game QI. He is also a director of Room 101.

Formerly a freelance vision mixer, Lorimer is well known in the British television industry for winning a court case against the Inland Revenue over his tax status as a freelancer, which served as a precedent for many other media workers.
