= Anne Miller (author) =

Scottish author (born c. 1988)

Anne Miller (born c. 1988) is a Scottish author, scriptwriter, producer, comedian, and researcher, best known for her work on the BBC Two quiz show QI.

== Early life and education ==
Miller was born in Fife, Scotland, and grew up in Newport and Tayport. She attended Madras College in St Andrews for secondary school and subsequently studied sociology and politics at The University of Edinburgh. She graduated with a masters in 2009. She wrote her first book at six years old.

== Career ==
Miller joined QI in 2011 and has variously worked as scriptwriter, assistant producer, producer, and researcher on the show and many of its other projects. She is the second-most frequent guest personality on the QI podcast No Such Thing as a Fish and is a producer and head researcher for BBC Radio 4's comedy talk show The Museum of Curiosity.

As part of the QI team, Miller has co-authored the following books:

- 1,342 QI Facts to Leave You Flabbergasted by John Lloyd, John Mitchinson, James Harkin, and Anne Miller. Published 2016, Faber & Faber.
- 1,423 QI Facts to Bowl You Over by John Lloyd, James Harkin, Anne Miller, and John Mitchinson. Published 2017, Faber & Faber.
- 2,024 QI Facts to Stop You in Your Tracks by John Lloyd, James Harkin, and Anne Miller. Published 2018, Faber & Faber.
- Funny You Should Ask... Your Questions Answered by the QI Elves by QI Elves. Published 2020, Faber & Faber.

In 2020, she released the first book in the Mickey and the Animal Spies children's series. This story centers on a young girl named Mickey who discovers a network of animal spies. The book contains and teaches readers how to crack coded messages.

- Mickey & the Animal Spies by Anne Miller. Published 2020, Oxford University Press.
- Mickey & the Trouble with Moles by Anne Miller. Published 2021, Oxford University Press.
- Mickey & the Missing Spy by Anne Miller. Published 2021, Oxford University Press.

She has also been published in online newspapers such as The Guardian, The Bookseller and The Herald. She wrote a literary column for Standard Issue magazine before it became a podcast in 2017.

== Personal life ==
She lives in London with husband Sam, who is a musical director and lecturer.
