= West Hill Park School =

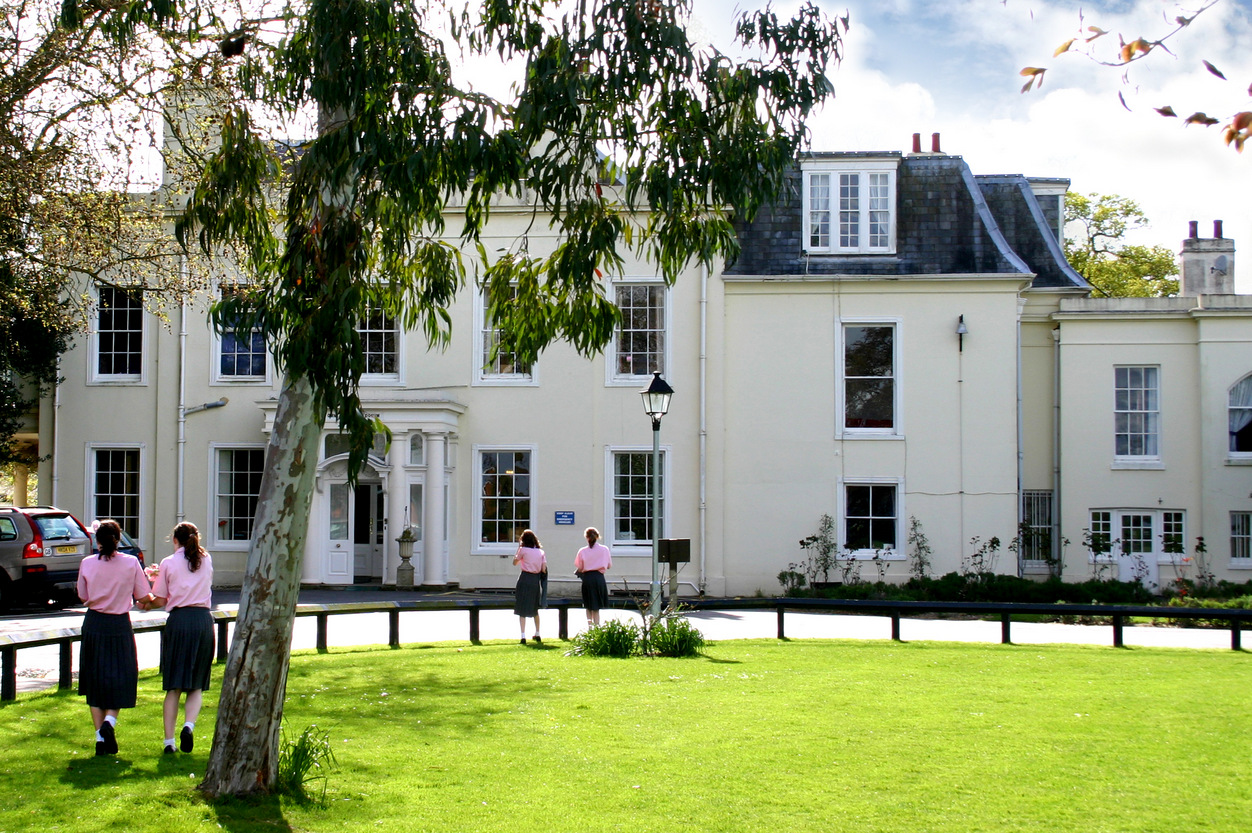
- West Hill Park School Building

Location
- St. Margaret's Lane; Titchfield, Hampshire, PO14 4BS; England; 50.84944°N 1.24554°W

Information
- Type: Independent day and boarding
- Established: 1920
- Department for Education URN: 116551 Tables
- Head teacher: Chris Ward
- Gender: Mixed-sex
- Age: 2.5 to 13
- Houses: Beaulieu, Hamble and Meon
- Colour
- Yearbook: The Lookout
- Website: http://www.westhillpark.com

West Hill Park School is an independent, coeducational, day and boarding school for boys and girls aged 2 years to 13 years. It is situated in Fareham, England close to the Hampshire coast, between Southampton and Portsmouth.

== History ==
West Hill Park School was established in 1920 by Charles Ransome. The school remained family owned until 1959 when it became a charitable trust. The school is set in 28 acres (11 hectares) in rural Hampshire overlooking the village of Titchfield. The main school building dates back to the 18th century and was originally the private residence of the influential Delmé family. It was established as a preparatory school in 1920 by Charles Ransome and has continued to this day.

== Today ==
West Hill Park is a non-selective school and does not have a formal entrance exam.

West Hill Park School is a member of The Boarding Schools' Association, The Independent Association of Prep Schools and The Independent Schools Council.

== Inspection Report ==
West Hill Park School was inspected by The Independent Schools Inspectorate (ISI) in March 2016. The Inspection Team considered West Hill Park to be ‘excellent’ in all of their judgements on each of the aspects of the school's work.

== Early years ==
Children may enter the Early Years Centre during the term in which they become three years old. They move into the Reception Class in the September following their fourth birthday. Children may attend full-time or part-time.

== Boarding ==
Ofsted inspected Boarding, health and welfare provision in June 2010. The report gives Boarding at West Hill Park an overall quality rating of ‘outstanding'. Health care, catering and the strong leadership of the school were specifically mentioned. The Boarding ethos of the school is described as professional but also relaxed, open and homely with an emphasis placed on respecting each other and showing courtesy and manners to everyone.

The Boarding Welfare Intermediate Inspection took place in November 2013.

== Saturday mornings ==
The "activity-based" Saturday encourages pupils from years 3–8 to attend Saturday school. The format of Saturday mornings is much less formal, uniform is not necessary on most Saturdays. (Saturday mornings count towards the mandatory statutory number of hours that a child must spend in school.)

Two activity slots of ninety minutes give the opportunity to offer activities off-site, (e.g. sailing or fishing) as well as a programme of pre-seasonal sports training, play rehearsals, art and design projects, bushcraft and other outdoor pursuits.

== Facilities ==
- Floodlit astroturf hockey surface
- Heated indoor swimming pool
- Netball and tennis courts
- Woodland classroom
- Riding school
