= Elizabeth Kay =

British writer

Elizabeth Kay (born 9 July 1949 in London) is an English writer. She is the author of The Divide trilogy, a series of children's fantasy novels, originally published by Chicken House Press, then picked up by Scholastic Books.

== Biography ==
Before going to art school she attended Nonsuch High School for girls in Cheam. Then went to art school and in her mid-twenties started writing radio plays, which were broadcast on BBC Radio 4. She also wrote stories which were published in newspapers and magazines and broadcast on Capital Radio in London.

Kay has an MA in creative writing from Bath Spa University, and has taught both creative writing and art for a number of years. She has illustrated several books and produced nearly all the artwork for her own website.

She has won several awards, including the Cardiff International Poetry Competition for a sestina "Pond Life" and the Canongate Prize for her short story "Cassie". A chapbook of poetry, The Spirit Collection, was published in 2000.

The Divide, her first book for children, was published in 2003. She was a keynote speaker at Accio 2005, the Harry Potter conference, and spoke at a children's book conference in Ukraine in 2007. She has appeared at other literary events, including the Cheltenham and Edinburgh festivals.

She has had three shorter books for children published by Barrington Stoke. Fury, in 2008, Hunted in 2009 and Lost in the Desert in 2011. The Tree Devil, for reluctant readers, was published in 2010 by Eprint. A novella for adults, Missing Link, was published in October 2009.

She self-published a novella for adults on the Kindle and iPad in 2012, Beware of Men with Moustaches, which was shortlisted for the Dundee International Book Prize.

Her latest book is Ice Feathers, a children's novel set in prehistoric Antarctica.

She has two adult daughters.
