= The Book of Animal Ignorance =

- The UK cover.
- Author: John Lloyd; John Mitchinson
- Illustrator: Ted Dewan
- Language: English
- Subject: Trivia
- Publisher: Faber and Faber
- Publication date: 4 October 2007
- Publication place: United Kingdom
- Media type: Hardback
- Pages: 203
- ISBN: 978-0-571-23370-0
- Preceded by: The Book of General Ignorance
- Followed by: Advanced Banter

The Book of Animal Ignorance is the second title in a series of books based on the intellectual British panel game QI, written by series-creator John Lloyd and head-researcher John Mitchinson. It is a trivia book, consisting largely of little-known facts about various animals, alongside factual corrections to other pieces of supposedly "well-known" trivia that, although widely believed, are not always accurate. It is a sequel to The Book of General Ignorance.

== Publication history ==
The Book of Animal Ignorance was first published in the UK by Faber and Faber on 4 October 2007, almost exactly a year after The Book of General Ignorance, and clearly targeted towards the same Christmas market. An American printing is likely to be forthcoming, since the success of General Ignorance in the UK Christmas market 2006 reputedly prompted "a two-book, six-figure" sale of the US publication rights, although the UK edition is already available through Amazon.com. From November 2007, it is distributed in Australia by Allen & Unwin. A Dutch translation of the book, Het grote boek van foute feiten over dieren, was published on 1 March 2009 by Uitgeverij Forum.

== Structure ==
Differing from its forebear, the QI Book of General Ignorance's structure as a question-and-answer trivia tome, The Book of Animal Ignorance instead opts for an encyclopaedic listing of 100 animals, providing information and facts for each. This change in style may be dictated simply by the content, but could also be as a direct result of criticism directed at the former title by Marcus Berkmann, referring to its disappointing similarity in format to a number of titles, and specifically New Scientist's 2005 book Does Anything Eat Wasps?

Touted on the cover as being "from the team that brought 'Ignorance' to millions", it promised to be a "bestiary for the 21st century," and contains almost-completely new "quite interesting" facts on 100 different animals, described in Fry's introduction as "the oats in the QI muesli". This new style and emphasis on new material clearly demonstrates the evolution of the QI brand, moving as it does away from the look of the initial book, a far more obvious simple rehashing of content from the TV series ('"General Ignorance" round), rather than being a complementary companion volume in its own right, as is Animal Ignorance.

Animal Ignorance again features forewords from both regular QI personalities, Stephen Fry and Alan Davies. In contrast to the preceding books' "Four words," Davies here contributes a 'proper' foreword, labelled a "Forepaw", in keeping with the book's subject matter. It comprises two-page spreads on 100 diverse mammals, reptiles, rodents, fish, birds and other beasts ranging from aardvark to worm (and not strictly "Aardvark to Zebra" as initially reported). The book was designed, typeset also illustrated (with "400 diagrams and cartoons") "by the brilliant Ted Dewan".

== Reviews, comments & criticism ==
QI: The Book of Animal Ignorance was one of 51 titles to make "The 2007 Exclusive Books List" (formerly the Publisher's Choice list) of "the best books to give or get" at Christmas, 2007.
