= Vitali Vitaliev =

Ukrainian-born journalist & writer (born 1954)

- Born: 1954 (age 71–72); Kharkov, Ukrainian SSR, Soviet Union
- Occupations: Newspaper journalist; author; TV presenter; radio presenter

Vitali Vitaliev (Ukrainian: Віталій Віталієв; born 1954) is a Ukrainian-born journalist and writer who has worked in Russia, the United Kingdom, Australia and Ireland.

== Biography ==
Vitaliev was born in 1954 in Kharkiv, USSR (present-day Ukraine). He graduated from Kharkiv University in French and English, working as an interpreter and translator before becoming a journalist in 1981. He worked as a special correspondent for Krokodil magazine in Moscow when he appeared as Clive James' 'Moscow Correspondent' on Saturday Night Clive. On 31 January 1990, he and his family 'defected', moving first to London, then taking up residence (and citizenship) in Australia. After a few years there, he moved back to the United Kingdom, living in London. He is now back in London again after spending some time in Edinburgh and Dublin. Vitaliev's books were translated from English into German, Japanese, Russian, Italian, Finnish, French, Spanish, Portuguese, Dutch and some other languages (see: Books).

In June 2018, Vitaliev was appointed Fellow of the Royal Geographical Society of Great Britain (FRGS) and in 2021-24 - Fellow of the Royal Literary Fund and the RLF Writing Fellow and Teaching Associate at Magdalene & Wolfson Colleges, University of Cambridge. He is also a member of the International Travel Writers Alliance (MITWA).

== Journalism ==
Vitaliev was the first Soviet journalist to publicly expose organised crime, the so-called Soviet Mafia, as well as the existence of prostitution, political prisoners and Soviet neo-Nazis. It was largely due to all those ground-breaking investigations and the resulting threats from both the criminal underworld and the KGB that he was forced to defect.

Vitaliev then worked for newspapers in Australia and the UK; and for the Irish magazine Village. In the UK he has written for Punch, The Listener, The Observer, The Spectator, The Independent, London Courier, The Sunday Times and The Sunday Telegraph. At different times, he was a staff writer and/or regular columnist for The Guardian, The European, The Glasgow Herald, The Australian, The Age, The Canberra Times, South China Morning Post, The Daily Telegraph, The Sunday Herald Sun and some other newspapers and magazines. In 1997–98, he worked as associate editor of Transitions magazine, in 2006-07 - as Editor-at-Large of Entrepreneur magazine and from May 2007 was Features Editor of E&T magazine (circulation 160,000; distribution in 120 countries)- until his retirement in July 2020. From February, 2025, Vitali has been contributing a regular 'Second Life' column to Prospect magazine, and from August 2025 - a fortnightly column to RAIL magazine.

== Television, Radio, Film ==
Vitaliev has written and presented several television documentaries for Channel 4, Australian Broadcasting Corporation and the BBC, including Tasmania, Moscow Central, Vitali's Australia, a 1990 episode in the BBC One series Byline titled "My Friend Little Ben," and a 1994 episode in the Channel 4 series Travels with My Camera titled "The Train To Freedom." He was a regular on BBC TV's Saturday Night Clive, broadcasting from Moscow and later from Melbourne live via satellite, and a guest on After Dark and Have I Got News for You. For almost 3 years, he appeared regularly in Europe Direct, BBC World's magazine programme on weekday evenings. His appearances on BBC Radio 4 include Breakaway, Excess Baggage, Midweek, Start the Week, In Our Time and his own series Eye on the East. In 2007, he was a researcher and script-writer for the multi-award-winning BBC comedy quiz TV show QI.

In October 2010, Vitaliev's factual drama (feature) film treatment The Pavlovsk Station made it to the shortlist of ten (out of 270 submissions) in the prestigious "Inspired by Science" film treatment award competition at London Screenwriters Festival. In 2016, his fantasy novel Granny Yaga was optioned by a Hollywood-based film production company. Vitali wrote and presented a 30-minute BBC Radio 4 programme The Life of Dental Losses, first broadcast on 16 March 2017.

== Awards ==
In the West, Vitaliev has won several literary and journalistic awards, including The Royal Melbourne Show Journalism Award (First Prize) in Australia, RTS Award for the best TV entertainment Show of 2007 (as part of the QI team). In 2009, he was shortlisted and "Highly Commended" in the UK Columnist of the Year category of the PPA Awards.

In July 2010, he was declared Winner of the USA Trade Association & Business Publications International Awards (TABPI) in three categories. In spring 2010, "Life as a Literary Device" made it to The Independent newspaper's list of Top Ten Best New Books. In April 2011, he was again shortlisted for a prestigious PPA UK Columnist of the Year Award, and in summer 2012 won another TABPI (see above) for the best regular magazine column. In 2013, was shortlisted for a BSME (British Society of Magazine Editors) Award for the Best Feature Idea.

In 2014, won another TABPI Award for Best Regular Column (Bronze), with the following judging comments: "Extraordinarily well written, crafted around unique technology topics and written in a personal way. Terrific entry."

In 2015, he was shortlisted again for the PPA Award in the "Columnist of the Year" category and won the GOLD TABPI AWARD for the best regular column for his "After All" column in E&T, with the following judging comments: "Vitali Vitaliev is a brilliant writer, with a huge depth and breadth of knowledge and is on top of his game in this column format where he uses his storytelling skills superbly. You cannot put his columns down until you have soaked up every word". Year 2016 saw him shortlisted for a PPA Award in the "Columnist of the Year" category and winning again (for the second year in a row) another USA-administered GOLD TABPI AWARD for the best regular column ("After All" for E&T magazine), with the following judging comments:"Engaging and approachable, Vitali's storytelling skill is exceptional. The dry humor, descriptive and simple language makes it not only easy, but enjoyable to read. I would have been happy had the column been double the length."

Years 2017 and 2018 were both marked two more PPA Columnist of the Year shortlistings.

In June 2018, Vitaliev was appointed Fellow of the Royal Geographical Society of Great Britain (FRGS) and in July of the same year won the SILVER TABPI AWARD for the best regular column, with the following judges' comments: "Outstanding column ... appealing to the 'real' people... Fabulous tone of voice."

In September 2018, Vitali got shortlisted for a BTJA (Business Travel Journalism Award) in the Features Writer of the Year category for his feature on the DMZ (demilitarised zone between North and South Korea) "The Zone of Fear and Hope" and in November 2018 came second in the Best Consumer Feature category of the 2018 Caribbean Travel Media Awards for his "Migrants of the Caribbean" feature in Geographical magazine. In October 2022, his Atlas of the World's Geographical Curiosities was named Stanford's Book of the Month, and the following month (in November 2022), a series of his 'After All' columns about the Russian invasion of Ukraine was shortlisted for the British Society of Magazine Editors (BSME) Columnist of the Year Award. In July 2024, Vitali's latest book Trucks in the Garden of Eden. In Search of Britain's Utopias was named Amberley's Book of the Month.

== Books ==
- 1987 King of the Bar Pravda Publishers. A collection of articles written for Krokodil magazine (in Russian).
- 1990 Special Correspondent – Investigating in the Soviet Union, Hutchinson, ISBN 0-09-174297-8; translated into German (Econ Verlag), French & Japanese (Shinchosa).
- 1991 Dateline Freedom – Revelations of an Unwilling Exile, Hutchinson, ISBN 0-09-174677-9.
- 1991 Vitali's Australia, Random House, ISBN 0-09-182554-7
- 1993 The Third Trinity (with Derek Kartun), Hodder & Stoughton, ISBN 0-340-55366-9; Seven editions in Germany: Aufbau Taschenbuch, Rutten & Loening, Fischer Taschenbuch etc.
- 1995 Little is the Light- Nostalgic Travels in the Mini-states of Europe, Simon & Schuster, ISBN 0-671-71925-4
- 1997 Dreams on Hitler's Couch, RC Books, Simon & Schuster, ISBN 1-86066-088-6
- 1999 Borders Up! Eastern Europe Through the Bottom of a Glass, Simon & Schuster, ISBN 0-684-81810-8
- 2008 Vitali's Ireland. Time Travels in the Celtic Tiger, Gill & Macmillan, September, ISBN 978-0-7171-4076-3
- 2008 Passport to Enclavia. Travels in Search of a European Identity, Reportage Press, October, ISBN 978-0-9558302-9-7; Russian translation (SNOB magazine, March 2009); Italian edition in 2010 (FBE Edizione);
- 2009 Life as a Literary Device, Beautiful Books, 31 October, ISBN 978-1-905636-44-0
- 2012 Life as a Literary Device, Kindle Edition by Thrust Books
- 2012 Passport to Enclavia, Kindle Edition by Thrust Books
- 2012 Vitali's Ireland, Kindle Edition by Thrust Books
- 2014 Granny Yaga A Fantasy Novel for Children and Adults released by Thames River Press, ISBN 978-1783081646
- 2014 Borders Up! Eastern Europe Through the Bottom of a Glass, Kindle and print edition by Thrust Books, ISBN 978-1908756510
- 2015 Little is the Light. Nostalgic Travels in the Mini-States of Europe; Kindle and print edition by Thrust Books, ISBN 978-1908756633
- 2016 Passport to Enclavia. Travels in Search of a European Identity; new print edition by Thrust Books, ISBN 978-1908756725
- 2016 Granny Yaga. A Fantasy Novel for Children and Adults; Kindle and print editions by Thrust Books, ISBN 978-1908756749
- 2018 Out of the Blu. A Science Fiction Comedy Thriller; published on 1 May 2018, ISBN 978-1908756992
- 2020 Vitali's Ireland, 2nd print edition, Thrust Books, ISBN 978-1912741045
- 2021 The Bumper Book of Vitali's Travels: Thirty Years of Globe-Trotting (1990 - 2020), Thrust Books, ISBN 978-1912741090
- 2021 Life as a Literary Device, Paperback Edition, Thrust Books, ISBN 978-1912741113
- 2022 Atlas of Geographical Curiosities, five editions in five languages, Jonglez publishers, ISBN 978-2-36195-530-4, English Edition; ISBN 978-2361955311, French Edition; ISBN 2361955318, Spanish edition; ISBN 2361956128, ISBN 2361955326, German Edition; ISBN 2361958325, Second German edition (2024); Italian edition (2023); Dutch Edition (2025) ISBN 2361959208;
- 2024 Trucks in the Garden of Eden. Around Britain in search of a Utopia., Amberley publishers; ISBN 978 1398100244 Kindle and print editions
- 2024 Dreams on Hitler's Couch, 3rd Edition; Thrust Books, ISBN 1912741156
- 2025 Atlas of Geographical Curiosities of Britain, Jonglez, ISBN 9782361959104

=== Anthologies ===
- Granta 64, Winter 1998 Russia, The Last Eighteen Drops (15 pages). Finnish translation in "Granta" Finland, 2015
- QI Annual, Faber & Faber, 2007. In collaboration.
- Nastoyashcheye Vremia magazine - an anthology of Vivisection columns (in Russian) - 2006
- The Best of Ogonyok. The New Journalism of Glasnost. William Heinemann, 1990. Three stories.
- The New Soviet Journalism: The Best of Soviet Weekly Ogonyok, Beacon Pr, 1991, Three stories.
- The Penguin Book of Fights, Feuds & Heartfelt Hatreds. An Anthology of Antipathy. Hardcover: Viking, 1992. Paperback: Penguin Books Ltd, 1993. One story
- Central Asia: Threats, Attacks, Arrests & Harassment of Human Rights Defenders. One of three authors/editors. Front Line, 2006
