= QI =

British comedy panel game television quiz show

- Also known as: Quite Interesting; QI XL (extended episodes); QI VG (compilation episodes); QI XS (compilation episodes)
- Genre: Comedy; Panel show
- Created by: John Lloyd
- Directed by: Ian Lorimer
- Presented by: Stephen Fry; Sandi Toksvig
- Starring: Alan Davies
- Theme music composer: Howard Goodall
- Country of origin: United Kingdom
- Original language: English
- No. of series: 24
- No. of episodes: 338 (list of episodes)

Production
- Producers: John Lloyd; Piers Fletcher (Series F–)
- Production locations: The London Studios (Series A–P); Television Centre, London (Series Q–)
- Editors: Nick King; Richard Everton (Series A)
- Running time: 30 minutes; 45 minutes (XL); 30 minutes (VG); 14 minutes (XS series 1); 8 minutes (XS series 2)
- Production companies: Quite Interesting Limited; Talkback (2003–2006; 2012–2025); Talkback Thames (2006–2012; 2025–present)

Original release
- Network: BBC Four (2003–2008); BBC One (2009–2011); BBC Two (2003–2008; 2011–present)
- Release: 11 September 2003 – present

Related
- The Museum of Curiosity; No Such Thing as a Fish; No Such Thing as the News; The Unbelievable Truth

QI (Quite Interesting) is a British comedy panel game quiz show for television created and co-produced by John Lloyd. The series currently airs on BBC Two and is presented by Sandi Toksvig. It features permanent panellist Alan Davies and three guest panellists per episode; the panellists are mostly comedians. The series was presented by Stephen Fry from its beginning in 2003 until 2016.

The format of the show focuses on the panellists answering questions that are extremely obscure, making it unlikely that the correct answer will be given. To compensate, the panellists are awarded points not only for the correct answer, but also for interesting ones, regardless of whether they are correct or even relate to the original question, while points are deducted for "answers which are not only wrong, but pathetically obvious" – typically answers that are generally believed to be true but in fact are misconceptions. These answers, referred to as "forfeits", are usually indicated by a loud klaxon and alarm bell, flashing lights, and the incorrect answer being flashed on the video screens behind the panellists. Bonus points are sometimes awarded or deducted for challenges or incorrect references, varying from show to show. QI has a philosophy that "everything is interesting if looked at in the right way". Many factual errors in the show have been corrected in later episodes or on the show's blog.

For its first five series shown between 2003 and 2007, episodes premiered on BBC Four before receiving their first analogue airing on BBC Two a week later. From 2008 to 2011, the show was moved to BBC One, with an extended-length edition of each episode often broadcast on BBC Two a day or two after the regular show's broadcast under the title of QI XL. Series G and H saw the regular show broadcast in a pre-watershed slot with the extended edition remaining within a post-watershed slot. Beginning with the I series, the regular show returned to a post-watershed slot on BBC Two. Syndicated episodes of previous series are regularly shown on Dave. In November 2020, a new compilation series titled QI XS started, with a run-time of 14 minutes per episode. A second series of XS, with an 8-minute running time, started in February 2023. Series of QI are assigned letters in sequence and episodes are themed around topics starting with that letter.

The show has received very positive ratings from critics and has been nominated for multiple awards; QI itself has the highest viewing figures for any show broadcast on BBC Two and Dave. Several books, DVDs and other tie-ins to the show have been released, and international versions of QI have been made in other countries.

== Format and concept ==
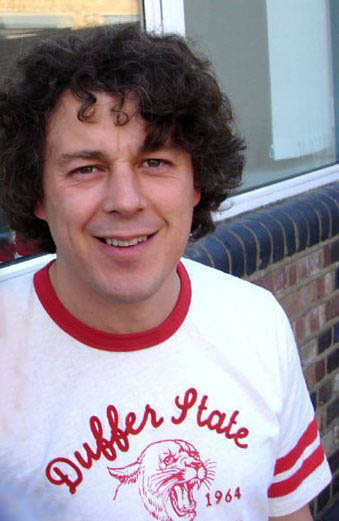
Comedian Alan Davies (pictured in 2007) has been a permanent QI panellist in every series.

The panel consists of four participants: three rotating guests and one regular, Alan Davies, who has the seat to the immediate right of the host. (Note: Davies has only sat to the immediate left in the R series episode "Reflections". He also sat to the left of Stephen in the G series episode "Green" because it was decided they should save energy by powering down one of the screens and have all panelists to the left.) Davies has appeared in every episode. However, in "Divination" he was not able to appear at the studio; he was still able to play "from beyond". (Note: Alan Davies was absent for the recording of this episode, as he did not want to miss his favourite football team, Arsenal, playing in the Champions League final that same evening. He did however make an appearance through pre-recorded material, which ended with him being 'teleported' to the match as he tested his buzzer.) Despite frequent wins, Davies often finishes last due to incurring forfeits.

Questions posed to the panellists are often misleading, obscure, or very difficult. Providing an "obvious but wrong" answer (referred to as a "forfeit") results in a sequence of klaxons, alarm bells, flashing lights, and a score penalty. Davies is often the panellist who gives these answers. In the first two series, Fry produced the given answer on a card to show the panellists, while it also flashed on the large screens behind them (except in the pilot episode and the first show of the first series, when only the cards were used). Starting in the third series, Fry's answer cards were dispensed with altogether, leaving only the screens as proof that such answers had been predicted.

Because the show's creators expected that hardly anyone would be able to give a correct answer without significant prompting, they instead encourage sheer "interestingness", which is how points are mainly scored. As such, tangential discussions are encouraged, and panellists are apt to branch off into frivolous conversations, give voice to trains of thought, and share humorous anecdotes from their own lives. The number of points given and taken away are normally decided by the host or beforehand by QI researchers known as "The QI Elves". For example, in one episode Davies was docked 10 points for suggesting "oxygen" to the question "What is the main ingredient of air?"

Negative scores are common, and occasionally even the victor's score may be negative. Score totals are announced at the conclusion of the show. Fry has said, "I think we all agree that nobody in this universe understands QI's scoring system." John Lloyd, QI's creator, has, on one occasion, admitted that not even he has any idea how the scoring system works, but there is someone who is paid to check on the scores. According to the Series A DVD, guests are allowed the right of appeal if they believe their score is wrong, but none has so far exercised that right.

=== Buzzers ===
Panellists are given buzzers to use in signalling a response, each of which produces a different sound when pressed. For the first three series, the sounds were seemingly random things or followed an arbitrary theme in each episode, such as commonly heard everyday sounds in the Series C episode "Common Knowledge." From Series D onward, all four sounds are based on the particular episode's theme, such as in the Series F episode "Films and Fame", sound clips associated with well-known movies, with Davies receiving Porky Pig's stuttering "That's all, folks!". The buzzers are always demonstrated at the beginning of the programme, but are usually given a shortened version for repeated use during the episode, mostly in General Ignorance. Davies "always gets the most demeaning sound" for his buzzer.

Sometimes, the buzzers have unique points to them, such as having questions based on them; in most cases they are about Davies' own. For example, one of his buzzer noises in the Series D episode "Descendants" sounded like a Clanger, and the panel had to try and guess what was being said. In the Series F episode "Fakes and Frauds", all the buzzers sounded like ordinary household objects, but three turned out to be the sound of the superb lyrebird mimicking the noises.

In other episodes, they were sometimes changed to suit the theme of an episode. For the Series D episode "Denial and Deprivation", the panellists had to use unique buzzers – two had bells, one flicked a ruler over the edge of a school desk, and Davies squeezed a toy chipmunk. In the Series G episode "Green", the buzzers were replaced with whistles so the show could be seen to be eco-friendly. On one occasion, points were automatically deducted from Davies' score solely because the buzzer did not match the theme of the episode, or activated the Klaxon.

=== General Ignorance ===
In a parody of ubiquitous general knowledge quizzes, the final round is off-topic and called "General Ignorance". It focuses on seemingly easy questions which have widely believed but wrong answers. Whereas in the main rounds of the show, the panellists' buzzer usage is not usually enforced, the "General Ignorance" questions are introduced by the host's reminder to keep "fingers on buzzers". "General Ignorance" was featured in every episode until the I (ninth) series, but featured only occasionally in the J (tenth) and K (eleventh) series before appearing regularly again in the L (twelfth) series. Due to the large number of "obvious but wrong" answers, panellists—especially Davies—usually incur the greatest point losses in this round.

=== Tasks and themes ===
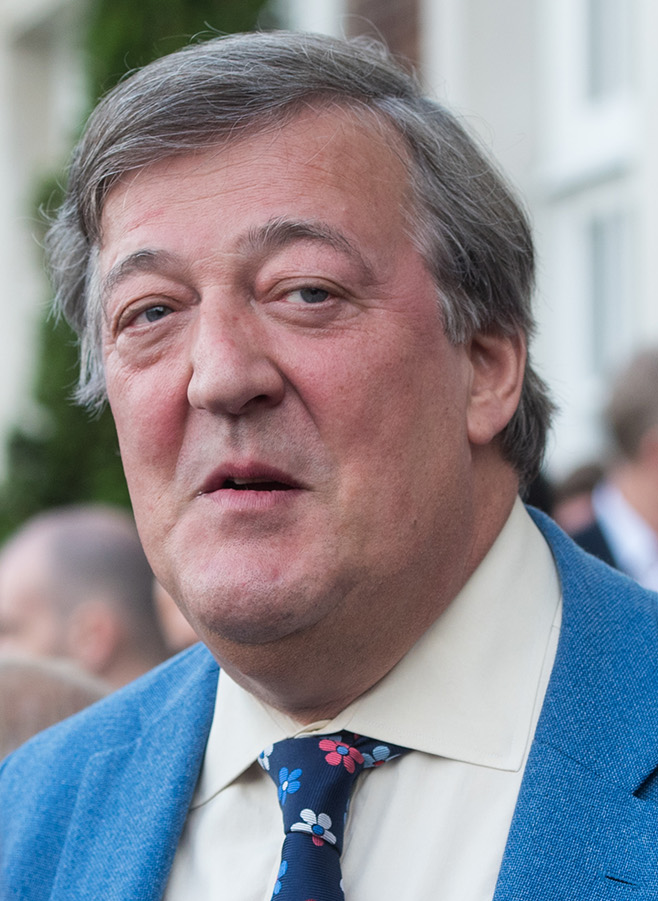
Stephen Fry was the QI Master from the pilot through to Series M in 2015.

In a number of episodes, either the set, the panellists' clothing, the opening theme, or a mixture of all, are changed to match the episode's theme. For example, in "Denial and Deprivation", the set was replaced with an auctioneer stand for Fry and school desks or side tables for the panellists, and the lighting was stripped down; while in "Health and Safety", the panellists wore hard hats, safety glasses, and bright yellow work vests and Fry wore a doctor's white coat and stethoscope.

In some episodes, an extra task is given to the panellists to complete during the course of an episode, which can earn them extra points. Such tasks have included a drawing contest, or spotting an item on the video screens and waving a "joker" card (e.g. Cuttlefish). Several series have had a recurring task spanning every episode, often involving the use of a joker card to respond to a question whose answer fit a specified theme. Examples include "The Elephant in the Room" (series E, elephants), "Nobody Knows" (Series I, for questions without a known answer) and "Spend a Penny" (Series L, lavatories).

In addition to assigning tasks, the host performs scientific experiments or demonstrations during certain episodes. Fry did so once an episode in the J, K and L series, where they were called "Jolly Japes", "Knick-Knakes" and "Lab Larks", respectively, and usually occurred towards the end of the episode. Such experiments either use simple objects, various chemical compounds, odd contraptions, or a mixture of all. If an experiment's outcome is too fast to be seen, a short "replay" of it is shown (sometimes with multiple angles) to reveal precisely what happened.

== Production ==
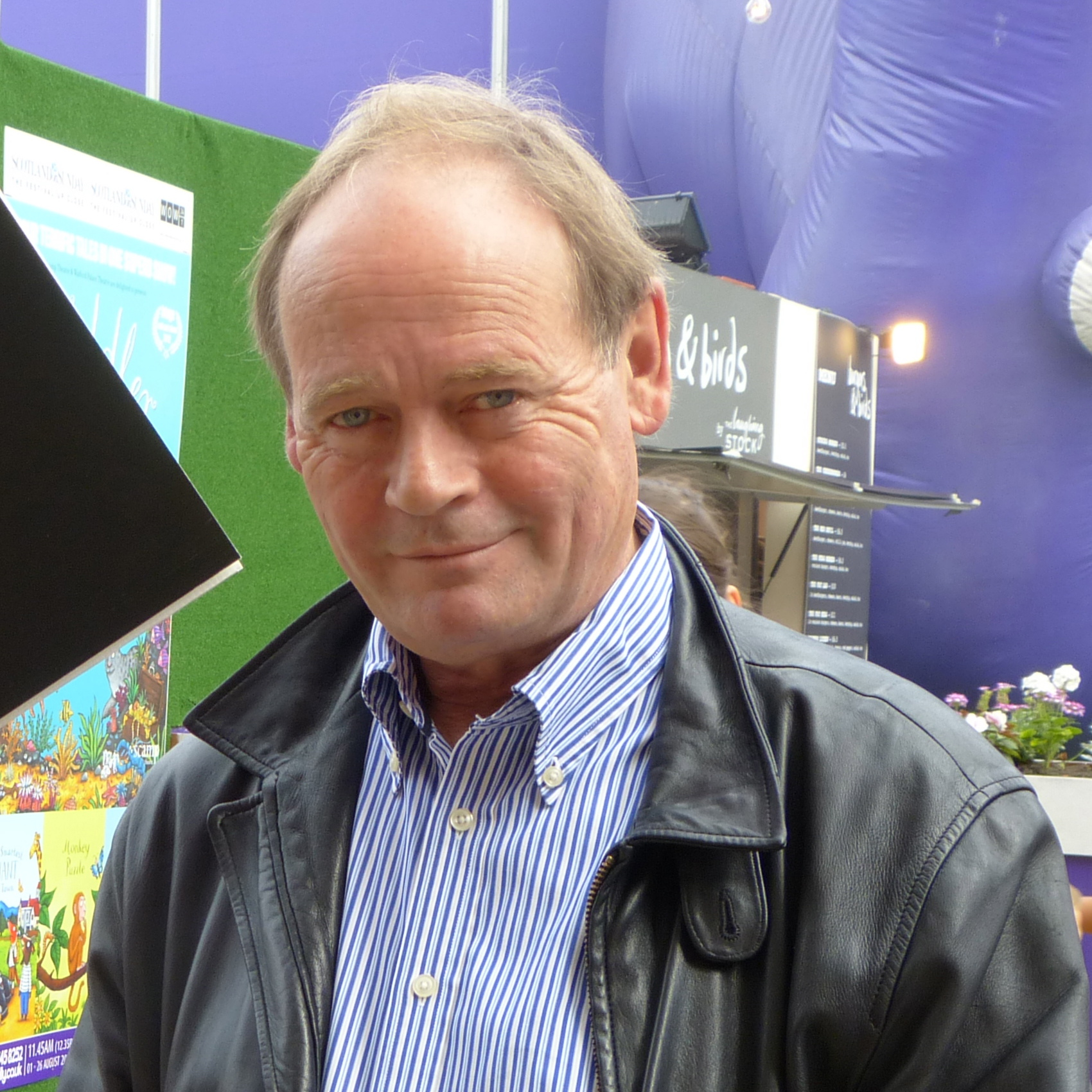
Veteran comedy producer John Lloyd was the driving force behind QI's creation.

Writer and former BBC producer John Lloyd devised the format of the show, and it is produced by Quite Interesting Limited, an organisation set up by Lloyd. QI was originally seen as being an "Annotated Encyclopædia Britannica ... the world's first non-boring encyclopaedia." As a panel game, it was conceived as a radio show, with Lloyd as chairman. While developing the show with Peter Fincham and Alan Yentob, Lloyd decided that it would work better on television. The three pitched it to Lorraine Heggessey, controller of BBC One at the time. Heggessey passed on the format, opting to commission a similar panel game called Class War, which was never made. When Fincham became controller of BBC One, Lloyd pitched it to him, only to be turned down by his former collaborator. Eventually, he pitched it to Jane Root, then controller of BBC Two, who agreed to develop it. When it was decided that the show would air on television, Michael Palin was offered the job of chairman with Fry and Davies as captains of the "cleverclogs" and "dunderheads" teams, respectively. However, when Palin decided not to take the job, the producers opted to change the format; Fry became the host, with Davies as the only regular panellist. Root commissioned a pilot and a further 16 episodes after that, although budget limitations reduced the first series to 12 episodes.

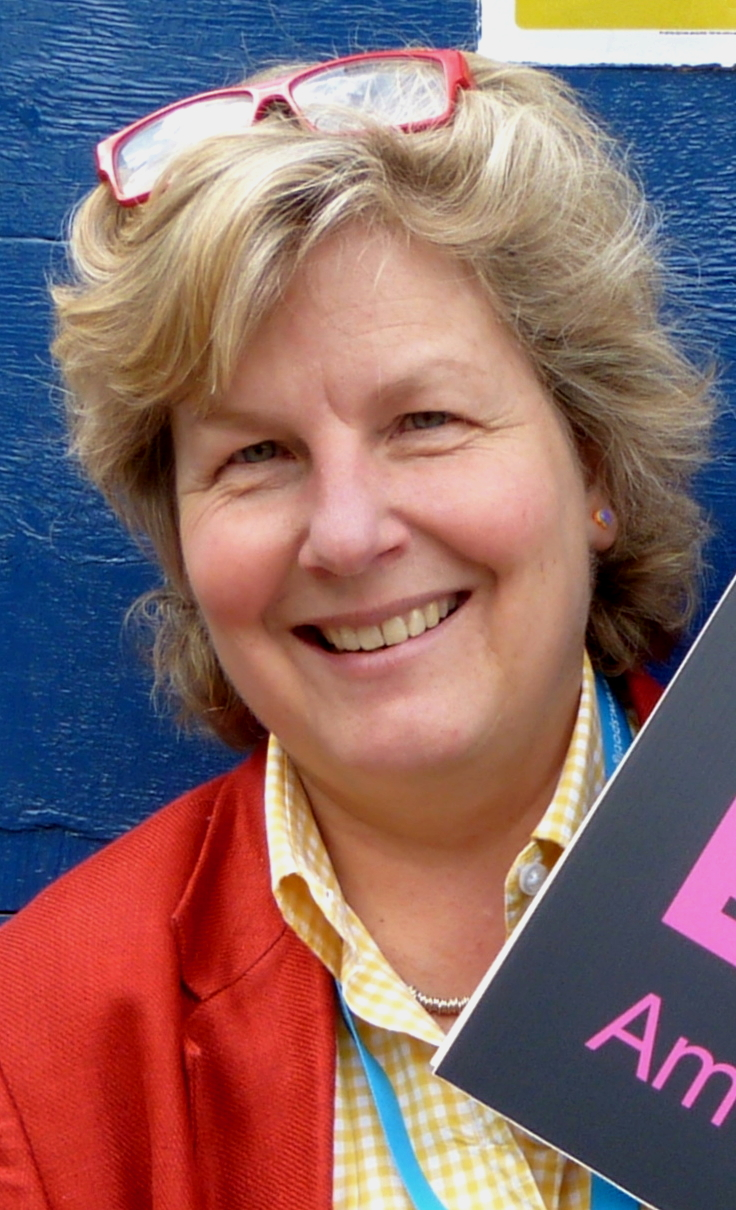
Danish-born Sandi Toksvig, a regular QI guest (Bantermeister), took over from Fry as QI Master (credited as "Nøgleperson") from Series N in 2016.

In October 2015, it was announced that Fry would be stepping down as host after Series M and would be replaced by Sandi Toksvig. Fry described his position on QI as "one of the best jobs on television", but that "it was time to move on". According to Alan Davies, Fry quit because the BBC cut the budget, so that three shows had to be recorded on the same day. "For budget reasons, they ended up making him do three shows in 24 hours", Davies said. Toksvig said that "QI is my favourite television programme both to watch and to be on". Lloyd said that Toksvig will be "the first female host of a mainstream comedy panel show on British television", and that although she is very different from Fry, she "will bring to the show the same kind of wonderful thing that Stephen does, the mixture of real brains and a hinterland of knowledge, plus this naughty sense of humour." He also said it will give the show a chance to "do things in a slightly different way".

=== Recording ===
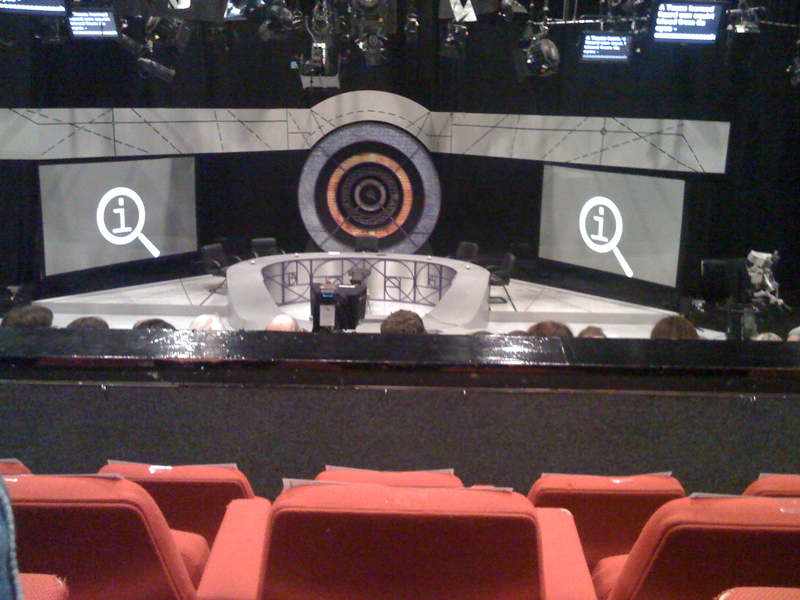
The QI panel set, seen empty in 2009, incorporates the QI logo.

Recordings usually take place over a few weeks in May or June; three episodes are typically filmed per week and sixteen are filmed for each series. Series A–P were filmed at The London Studios, with Series Q onwards being filmed at Television Centre.

In the morning on the day of recording, the studio has to be set up. Seven cameras are used to record QI. To check that images, forfeits, buzzers and lighting are working, the first technical rehearsal is hosted by floor manager Guy Smart with stand-ins for panellists. Fry, who was given the list of questions roughly an hour beforehand, hosted the second technical rehearsal at 2:00 pm. Guests may have time to practice with a set of warm-up questions.

For earlier series, warm-up comedians were used before recording began, frequently Stephen Grant, credited as the "audience wrangler". There have been no warm-ups for recent series. Fry recorded and tweeted audience AudioBooms and introduced the guests before the show. Recordings start at either 4:30 pm or 7:30 pm and last up to two hours, although only 30 minutes of footage is used for normal episodes and 45 minutes for "XL" episodes. By 10:00 pm, recording has usually finished and the set has been disassembled. Roughly 16 questions are asked and about half of those make it into the show; about 20% of material researched is used in a QI episode, while other facts may appear in the XL versions, a QI book, on QI's Twitter feed or on their website.

In March 2020, due to the COVID-19 pandemic, two episodes of series R were filmed without an audience, due to social distancing requirements. Further series R episodes were recorded with a virtual audience via Zoom.

=== Questions seen beforehand ===
The makers of the show insist that the answers are not given to the panellists beforehand. The host is given a list of questions about an hour before the show, for preparatory purposes, but the guests are forbidden to ask for preparatory materials or other help. Alan Davies never does any preparation.

In a 2010 interview with the Radio Times regarding the current state of the BBC, Fry revealed that one of the regular panellists insisted on seeing the questions before they appear in the show.

There's only one regular guest who always insists on seeing the questions beforehand and prepares for them. I won't tell you his or her name ... It really annoys me. In fact, one day, I'll make sure that person is given a list from another programme because they don't need them.

Following this comment, people asked Fry to identify the guest and some posted their own speculations. Fry later posted on his Twitter account that it was neither Davies nor Rob Brydon. In a 2022 Q&A at the Oxford Union, regular panellist Dara Ó Briain said that the guest in question was someone who had since died, but was not Sean Lock.

=== Research ===
The research for the show is mostly carried out by seven people called the "QI Elves", a team which has included Justin Pollard, Vitali Vitaliev, Molly Oldfield (daughter of Mike Oldfield), Stevyn Colgan and Jenny Ryan. The "elves" devise the questions for the show, and one is on set during filming who is able to communicate with the host during the show to provide and correct information. Other people involved in researching questions and compiling the scripts are John Mitchinson and Piers Fletcher, known (along with Justin Pollard, Molly Oldfield, and James Harkin) as the Question Wranglers, whose research uses both Encyclopædia Britannica and Wikipedia. The QI website also has a forum.

A QI Elves podcast, No Such Thing as a Fish, began on 8 March 2014. The title is taken from an entry into the Oxford Encyclopedia of Underwater Life (although in the opening theme of the first 41 episodes it is incorrectly referenced as the Oxford 'Dictionary' of Underwater Life), which was used on the show. The audio from the first episode in which they discuss how they found this fact is used as an introduction. Regular elves are Anna Ptaszynski, James Harkin, Dan Schreiber, and Andrew Hunter Murray, with occasional appearances from Alex Bell and Anne Miller. Schreiber is the host of the show. Its theme song is "Wasps" from the band Emperor Yes, which is based on a fact about bees which was used on QI. The song is written as an exchange between the bees, as they defend their hive from attacking wasps by swarming the wasp, and using their body heat to kill the wasps by overheating. A TV show entitled No Such Thing as the News aired for two seasons in 2016, following a similar format based around news stories and current events. In 2018, an online behind the scenes series that followed the podcasters on their UK tour was released called 'Behind The Gills'.

== Episodes ==
In QI, every series takes its theme from a different letter of the alphabet, starting with the letter "A". Series are referred to by letter rather than number. The first series started on 11 September 2003, and consisted of topics beginning with "A". The second series consisted of topics beginning with "B" and also saw the first attempts to pay attention to a particular theme throughout one episode, e.g. "Birds" (the over-riding theme did not necessarily begin with "B", although the questions always contained an element that did). The only exceptions to the alphabet system have been the Christmas specials, where the topics are often Christmas-based and do not necessarily correspond to that series' letter (although greater attempts have been made to do so since Series D).

Series D was the first to see all the episodes focus upon a single topic or theme, beginning with the series letter (e.g. Danger), and for each to be given an official title connected to the topic/theme. It also saw Fry modify his introduction of the panellists, by incorporating the theme/topic of the episode, with Davies often getting the "demeaning" introduction. This trend has continued with each subsequent series; episodes from previous series were retroactively given titles. A video podcast (featuring the best moments with some out-takes) was planned to accompany Series E, but this was instead turned into a set of "Quickies" featured on the QI homepage of the BBC's website. As this decision was not reached until after recording, the videos are still referred to as "vodcasts" by whoever is introducing them (usually Fry but occasionally a panellist or even the audience.) The series was ended by a special outtake compilation entitled "Elephants".

Points may be given to (or taken from) the studio audience, and six episodes have the distinction of being won by the audience: "Death", the fifth episode in Series D; "England", the 10th episode in Series E; "Flora & Fauna", the 10th episode in Series F; "Greeks", the 14th episode in Series G; "Next", the 15th episode in Series N; and "Quantity and Quality", the 15th episode in Series Q. The audience's win in "Greeks" was only announced during the XL broadcast as their contribution was cut out of the main broadcast. In contrast, the audience lost the fifth episode of Series E, "Europe", receiving a forfeit of −100 when they incorrectly sang the first stanza of the German national anthem, and the fourth episode of Series Q, “Queasy Quacks”, when they received a forfeit for referring to the first patient in a disease outbreak as Patient Zero. Several others have scored points in certain episodes by making appearances on the set or screens; these have included ASIMO (a humanoid robot) and US President Barack Obama.

A special stand-alone episode was filmed between 1:00 and 2:00 a.m. (GMT) on 6 March 2011 as part of Comic Relief's special 24 Hour Panel People featuring David Walliams, who appeared in various old and new panel game shows throughout a 24-hour period. The shows were streamed live on the Red Nose Day website, and parts of each show were shown during five half-hour specials on Comic Relief. The QI episode featured panellists Sue Perkins, Jo Brand, Russell Tovey and David Walliams. Davies admitted through Twitter that he was asked to host the episode when it was not certain if Fry would be available, but Davies declined. Once Fry confirmed his participation, Davies did not hear back from the production team. Unlike the classic format of the show where most questions follow a subject, this episode was instead an hour-long General Ignorance round.

== Guest appearances ==
As of 10 November 2026, the following have all appeared multiple times as one of the guest panellists on the show. This list does not include the unbroadcast pilot, nor the special editions for the Comic Relief and Sport Relief telethons, nor any live stage editions.

47 appearances

- Bill Bailey^{[a]}

46 appearances

- Phill Jupitus

44 appearances

- Jimmy Carr^{[c]}

43 appearances

- Jo Brand^{[b]}^{[e]}

33 appearances

- David Mitchell

27 appearances

- Sean Lock

25 appearances

- Rich Hall

20 appearances

- Ross Noble
- Josh Widdicombe

19 appearances

- Aisling Bea
- Jason Manford

18 appearances

- Holly Walsh

17 appearances

- Sara Pascoe

16 appearances

- Clive Anderson
- Cariad Lloyd
- Sandi Toksvig^{[c]}^{[d]}

15 appearances

- Rob Brydon
- Sue Perkins^{[b]}

14 appearances

- Susan Calman
- Jeremy Clarkson
- Dara Ó Briain
- Johnny Vegas

12 appearances

- Sarah Millican

11 appearances

- Gyles Brandreth
- Joe Lycett

10 appearances

- Nish Kumar
- John Sessions

9 appearances

- Danny Baker
- Victoria Coren Mitchell
- Jack Dee
- Sally Phillips^{[e]}

8 appearances

- Cally Beaton
- Noel Fielding
- Zoe Lyons
- Lee Mack^{[c]}

7 appearances

- Tom Allen
- Ronni Ancona
- Daliso Chaponda
- Rhod Gilbert
- Andy Hamilton
- Colin Lane
- Richard Osman
- Lou Sanders

6 appearances

- Maisie Adam
- Eshaan Akbar
- Bridget Christie
- Matt Lucas
- Chris McCausland
- Romesh Ranganathan
- Liza Tarbuck

5 appearances

- Stephen K. Amos
- Desiree Burch
- Rosie Jones

4 appearances

- Ed Byrne
- Jeremy Hardy
- Alice Levine
- Vic Reeves
- Ahir Shah
- Mark Steel
- Jack Whitehall

3 appearances

- Nabil Abdulrashid
- James Acaster
- Chris Addison
- Julian Clary
- Richard Coles
- Roisin Conaty
- Reginald D. Hunter
- Lucy Porter
- Kiri Pritchard-McLean
- Arthur Smith
- Linda Smith
- Sindhu Vee
- Mark Watson
- Julia Zemiro

Rich Hall has the highest number of guest appearances in a single series—six times in Series B (half of the episodes that year), while Phill Jupitus has won the most episodes of any guest panellist, with 14.

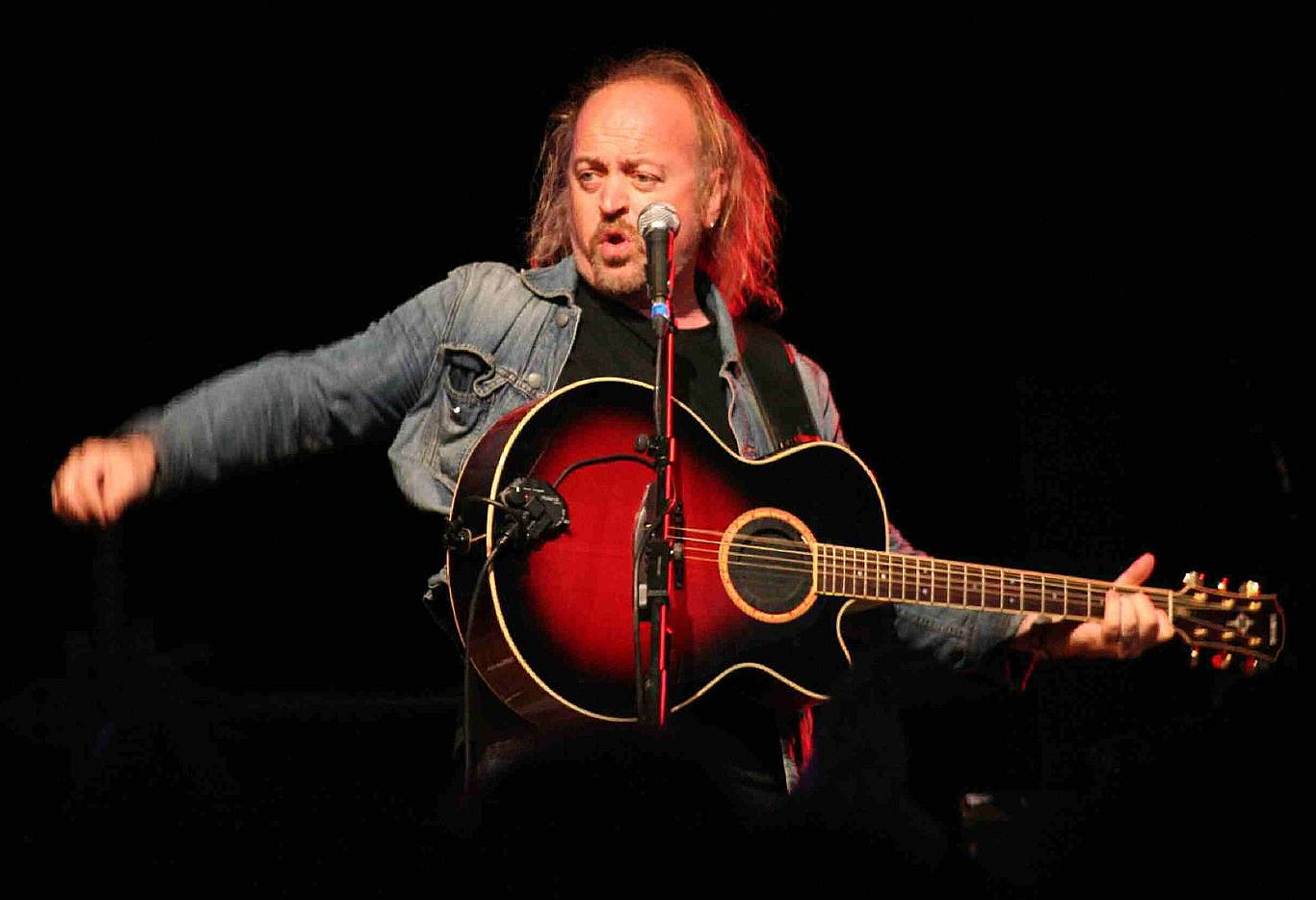
Musical comedian and actor Bill Bailey has appeared on 47 episodes - more than any other guest panellist - as well as the pilot.

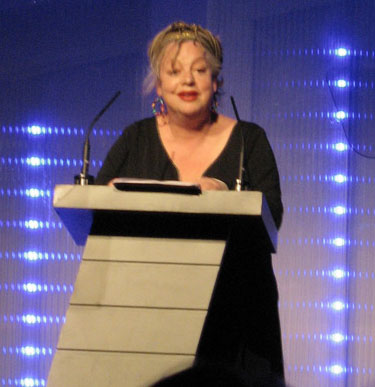
Comedian and actor Jo Brand has appeared on 43 episodes of the show.

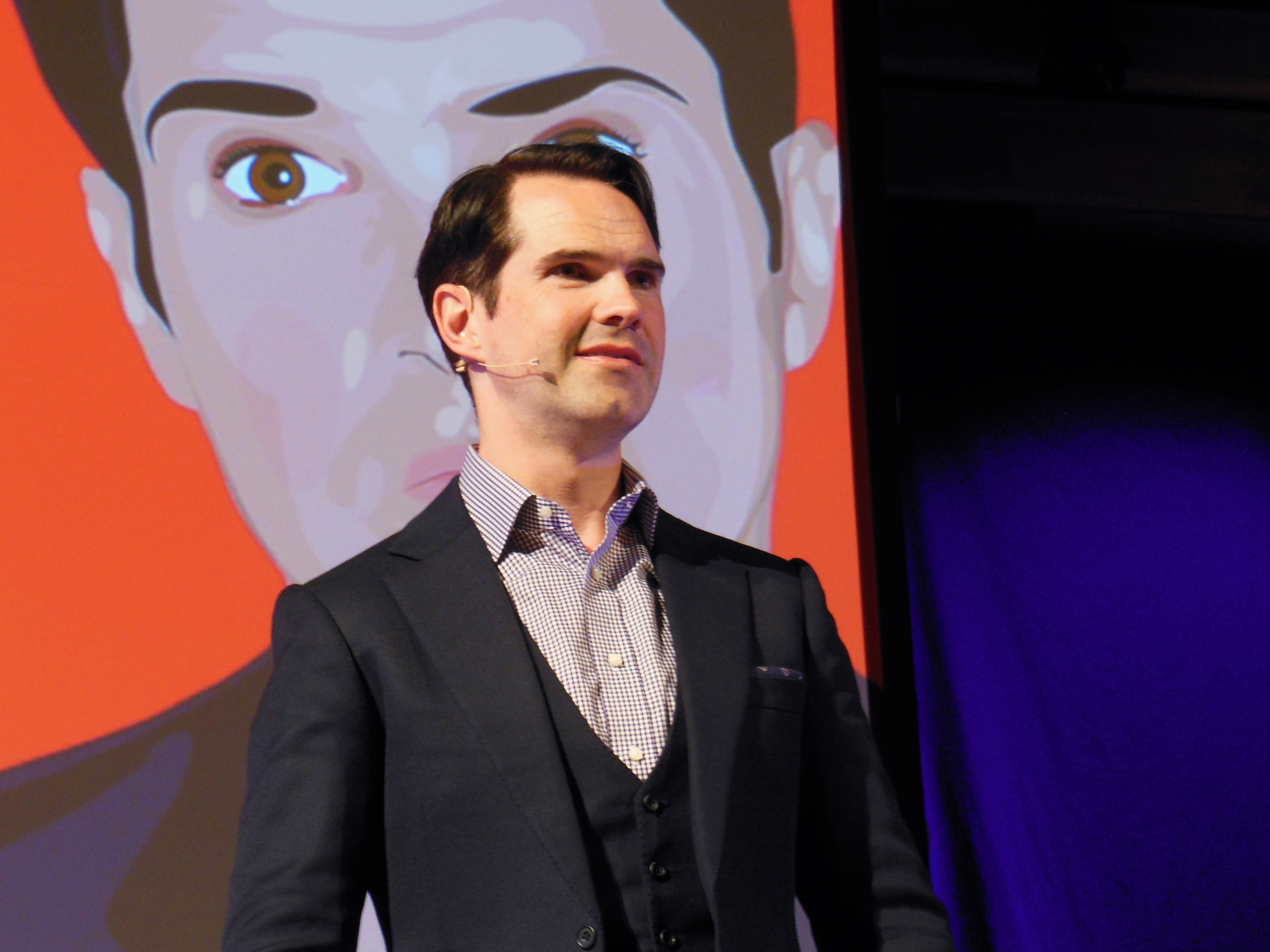
Comedian and 8 Out of 10 Cats host Jimmy Carr has appeared in every series except series 'R'.

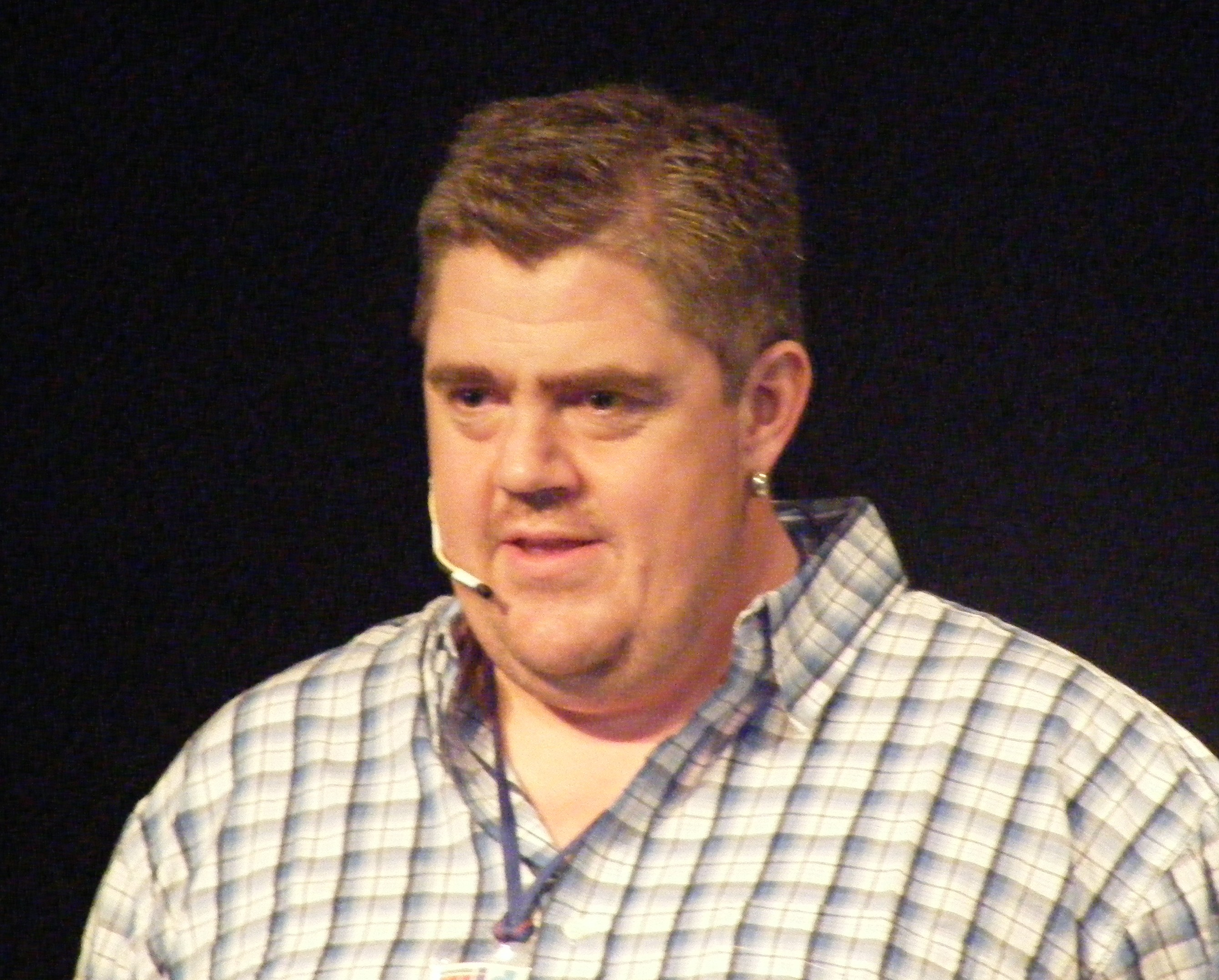
Former Never Mind the Buzzcocks captain and comedian Phill Jupitus appeared in every series up to series 'R'.

Bailey, Brand, Carr and Jupitus are the only guest panellists to have made 40 or more appearances.

a. ^{1} Also made an additional appearance in the unbroadcast pilot.
b. ^{1} ^{2} Also made an additional appearance in the 2011 Comic Relief episode.
c. ^{1} ^{2} ^{3} Also made an additional appearance in the live Sport Relief episode.
d. ^{1} Excluding Series N onwards. Toksvig took over hosting duties from Fry from the start of Series N.
e. ^{1} ^{2} Also made an additional appearance in the 2022 Comic Relief episode.

== International broadcasts ==
As of 2011, QI is distributed by Fremantle.

In Australia, QI is broadcast on the ABC. The programme was first broadcast on 20 October 2009 after the surprise ratings success of Stephen Fry in America. The ABC aired QI Series F first, but subsequently, in July 2010, ABC1 began broadcasting QI from the very beginning with Series A. QI has also been broadcast on the pay TV channel UKTV.

In March 2010, QI began a run in New Zealand on Prime. This was also aired on BBC UKTV in New Zealand. On 27 May 2011, Series A of QI was broadcast in South Africa on BBC Entertainment. QI series A-Q has also aired on BBC Entertainment in the Nordic countries.

There have been several attempts to broadcast QI in the United States. US networks that have tried to broadcast the series include Comedy Central, PBS, Discovery Channel and BBC America. Show creator and producer John Lloyd said that one factor in the failure to get the show broadcast is due to the cost. As QI features several images during each episode there are copyright issues. Lloyd said in an interview with TV Squad that: "No country in the world has bought the original show and this is partly a matter of cost. The pictures in the background of the show are only cleared for UK usage, so until the show is bought by a Stateside TV company and the rights cleared for World, the programme (is) unaffordable by smaller countries."

Amongst the famous names also to express anger over QI not being shown in the US include comedian John Hodgman, who appeared as a "fifth guest" in the second episode of Series G. In 2013, QI was picked up in the US by the streaming video service Hulu. On 30 January 2015, BBC America announced that they had acquired QI and planned on airing the show, beginning with Series J, on 19 February 2015.

Davies has criticised QI being repeated so often, saying "QI being in a soup of shows on one of these repeat channels ... completely devalues the brand". Davies thought the show would gain more viewers when a new series aired if channels made "an audience wait for a couple of months".

== Versions and spin-offs ==
=== International versions ===
In 2008, the QI format was sold to the Dutch broadcaster VARA. Also called QI, the Dutch version of the show aired for the first time on 27 December 2008 and was hosted by the writer Arthur Japin with the comedian Thomas van Luyn taking the role of regular panellist. Japin also appeared (in the audience) in a British QI episode, "Gothic", explaining how the name Vincent van Gogh should be pronounced. The Dutch series was discontinued after six episodes.

A Swedish version of QI started airing on SVT1 8 September 2012, and was called Intresseklubben. Comedian Johan Wester hosted Intresseklubben, and Anders Jansson was featured as the regular panellist. A second series covering the letter B started airing in September 2013; Series C was recorded in June 2014 and aired in late 2014, while season D was recorded in June 2015 and started airing in August 2015.

A Danish version of QI, called Quiz i en hornlygte aired on DR2 between 2012 and 2013. The show was hosted by Danish comedian Carsten Eskelund. While not directly branded as a Danish version of QI, it maintained some recognisable elements, such as the difficulty of some questions and awarding points for interesting answers as well as negative points for wrong, but widely believed, answers.

The Czech version of QI was first broadcast on TV Prima on 14 August 2013. The programme is hosted by Leoš Mareš, with Patrik Hezucký appearing as a guest in every episode.

=== The QI Test ===
The QI Test was a planned spinoff version of QI that was to be broadcast on BBC Two. Created by Lloyd, Talkback Thames' Dave Morely and former QI Commercial Director Justin Gayner, The QI Test differed from QI in that it would have featured members of the public as contestants instead of comedians and celebrities. It would have been broadcast during the daytime schedules. The pilot was not hosted by Fry and was recorded in November 2009, but a series was never broadcast.

== Mistakes and fact correction ==
Some of the answers on the show have been disputed and shown to be incorrect. In Series A, the show claimed that the longest animal in the world was the lion's mane jellyfish, but this was later corrected in Series C, saying that the longest animal in the world is the bootlace worm.

Members of the public and members of the QI website contact the show to correct information. At the end of the third series, Dara Ó Briain was docked points for having stated, in the previous series, that the triple point of water is zero degrees Celsius, an answer which earned him 2 points at the time. Viewers had written in to say that the triple point of water is in fact 0.01 degrees, and so the 2 points awarded Ó Briain in the previous series were revoked and he received a further deduction of 10 points for "saying a now obvious answer".

Various other retractions are made by the producers of the show on the special features of the DVD releases. The origin of the error may also be explained. For instance, Fry made a mistake when explaining why helium makes your voice higher, in the Series B Christmas special. He claimed that the gas only affected the frequency, but not the pitch, despite them being the same thing; in actuality, the timbre is affected.

Information contributed by a panellist during a discussion, but which has since been found to be false, have also been corrected. In the "Knowledge" episode in Series K it was explained that many facts on the show are later shown to be incorrect. Points were refunded to three panellists who had appeared previously; The largest refund went to Davies, who received in excess of 700 wrongly deducted points. Fry gave some examples of incorrect facts told in previous episodes, such as ones relating to lobster ages, the evolution of giraffe's necks and millipede legs.

More recently, the online forum now includes a "QI Qibbles" blog, which aims to rectify further mistakes in the show.

=== Notable examples ===
==== Welsh word for "blue" ====
The error that has attracted the most complaints to date was made in Series B, when it was claimed that the Welsh language has no word for blue. In fact, the word is glas. The error was explained on the "Banter" section of the Series B DVD as a mistake on the part of John Lloyd himself (the show's producer).

==== Flobbadob ====
An episode in Series B claimed that the language spoken by children's TV characters Bill and Ben was called "Flobbadob" and was named after the onomatopoeic phrase that supposed creator Hilda Brabban's younger brothers (after whom the characters were named) gave to their bath farts during their early childhood. However, in Series D, Fry read out the following letter written by Silas Hawkins, the son of veteran voice-over talent Peter Hawkins, who provided the original voices of the characters:

The fart-in-the-bath story was trotted out last year in an episode of Stephen Fry's otherwise admirable quiz show QI. It (the story) first appeared some twenty years ago in a newspaper article, to which my father immediately wrote a rebuttal. This was obviously ferreted out by some BBC researcher. It may be quite interesting, but in this case, it just isn't true.

Fry then apologised and corrected the error, saying "Their language is called 'Oddle poddle'. 'Flobbadob' means 'Flowerpot' in Oddle poddle."

It has later been established that while Hilda Brabban did sell stories about characters named Bill and Ben to the BBC in the 1950s, these bear no resemblance to the Bill and Ben of the Flower Pot Men.

== Culture ==
QI has stated it follows a philosophy: everything in the world, even that which appears to be the most boring, is "quite interesting" if looked at in the right way. The website states that:

"We live, they say, in The Information Age, yet almost none of the information we think we possess is true. Eskimos do not rub noses. The rickshaw was invented by an American. Joan of Arc was not French. Lenin was not Russian. The world is not solid, it is made of empty space and energy, and neither haggis, whisky, porridge, clan tartans nor kilts are Scottish. So we stand, silent, on a peak in Darien a vast, rolling, teeming, untrodden territory before us. QI country. Whatever is interesting we are interested in. Whatever is not interesting, we are even more interested in. Everything is interesting if looked at in the right way. At one extreme, QI is serious, intensely scientific, deeply mystical; at the other it is hilarious, silly and frothy enough to please the most indolent couch-potato."

On 28 December 2009, the BBC Radio 4 panel game The Unbelievable Truth, hosted by frequent QI guest panellist David Mitchell, broadcast a New Year's Special which paid tribute to QI. The show featured Fry, Davies and Lloyd on the panel, as well as Rob Brydon, another regular QI participant.

== Controversies and criticism ==
=== Content perceived as offensive ===
In December 2010, panellists on QI made jokes during a discussion about Tsutomu Yamaguchi, who survived both atomic bombings of Hiroshima and Nagasaki in August 1945. Yamaguchi had died only earlier that year. The Japanese embassy in London wrote a letter of complaint to the BBC about the content of its quiz show after being alerted to the content when viewers in Japan contacted diplomatic staff. Yamaguchi's daughter also made known how upset she was as a result of the comments broadcast on the BBC. She said that Britain, as a nuclear power, had no right to "look down" on her father.

In January 2011, the BBC issued an apology for "any offence caused" to Japan by the incident, recognising "the sensitivity of the subject matter for Japanese viewers". In February 2011, the BBC cited a "strength of feeling" in Japan following its atomic bomb joke broadcast in its decision to cancel the filming of part of its Planet Word documentary in Japan, which was due to be presented by Fry.

In February 2011, the BBC received several complaints about jokes made in an episode of QI about Margaret Thatcher. Regular panellist Jo Brand commented that Lady Thatcher sounded like "a device for removing pubic hair". Later, panellist Phill Jupitus shouted "Burn the witch!" when a digitally altered picture of Thatcher, showcasing the Thatcher effect optical illusion, was shown on-screen. Several Conservative politicians condemned the remarks; and Lord Tebbit complained that "Lady Thatcher has been treated like this by the BBC for the past 30 years".

In 2011, an episode of QI featuring Jeremy Clarkson was withdrawn due to controversial comments Clarkson had recently made about people dying by suicide by jumping in front of trains. The QI episode did not contain any such statements, but was postponed "to avoid putting Clarkson in the spotlight". The episode, on the subject of "idleness", was broadcast later.

On 11 January 2013, an episode of QI ending with Fry reading a limerick about paedophilia was criticised by viewers, especially as it was broadcast directly before a Newsnight report on Jimmy Savile. The BBC Trust described the incident as "unfortunate and regrettable" and the limerick as "capable of causing offence", but ruled it was not in breach of BBC guidelines.

=== Gender gap ===
Number of female panellists in the first 170 episodes (up to September 2014) of QI (30.1% female guests).
1. None (38.0%)
2. One (55.9%)
3. Two (5.40%)
4. Three (0.70%)

The BBC has received criticism regarding the lack of women on their comedy panel shows. As a result, the corporation decided to ban all-male panels on comedy shows in February 2014, with BBC's director of TV Danny Cohen stating in an interview with The Observer that "shows without women are unacceptable". In November 2014, Mirror reported stats revealing that 38% of all QI episodes at that time had featured only men, 55.9% featured only one woman, and only the remaining 6.1% had two or three women, out of a total of three guest panellists per episode (the fourth one being regular panellist Alan Davies).

In 2017, creator of QI John Lloyd commented on BBC's decision, telling the Cheltenham Literature Festival that "arguing a BBC quota for women panellists risked being mere tokenism". His wife Sarah Wallace—director of QI Limited—stated that female comedians are hesitant to appear on the show.

In April 2014, Sandi Toksvig, who was hosting The News Quiz on BBC Radio 4 at that time, had also criticised BBC's decision saying that "recruiting more female hosts would be a more desirable way of correcting the imbalance." She explained that women would feel more comfortable about participating with a female host, and described the fact that many quiz shows are presented by men as "slightly ridiculous".

In 2015, when Toksvig took over from Fry as a host of QI, she told the Guardian newspaper: "If I can show that by hosting a programme like this women neither destroy the social fabric of this country [nor] frighten the horses, it's a very good job." She herself continues to encourage women to be smart and funny when they appear on the show. In 2018, Emma Cox of Radio Times highlighted a notable difference between QI and other "aggressively masculine" panel shows.

In September 2018, while responding to a question on equal pay at the Women's Equality Party's conference, Toksvig revealed that she receives 40% of what Stephen Fry was being paid as the host of QI, and the same amount as panellist Alan Davies. Talent fees for QI are managed by Talkback.

Approximately ten years after the Mirror reported that 30.1% of QI guests were female, this number had increased to 31.9%.

== Reception ==
You feel like you're at the pub with the funny, clever people, ear-wigging on their slightly tipsy meanderings, rather than standing against a wall while they fire their joke cannons at you. It draws you in, all that familiarity and casual pontification.

— Julia Raeside of The Guardian

QI was received very positively by its viewers. It was the most popular programme on BBC Four in 2005, and one of its books, The Book of General Ignorance, became a global best-seller for Christmas 2006.

QI has been supported by nearly all critics. Peter Chapman said, "When the schedules seem so dumbed-down, it's a delight to encounter the brainy and articulate Stephen Fry. He excels in this format, being both scathing and generous." Another critic, Laura Barton said, "QI and its canny coupling of Stephen Fry and Alan Davies, which manages to condense tweedy goodness, cockney charm, pub trivia and class war into one half-hour."

Julia Raeside from The Guardian reviewed the show during its tenth series, calling it "still rather more than quite interesting" and complimenting it for being "one of the last truly popular programmes on mainstream television where comedians are allowed to be clever". Raeside noted ratings were still high, as four million viewers in total watched the first J series episode of QI and QI XL. American critic Liesl Schillinger described QI as "Jeopardy! with Stephen Colbert as host, with Steve Martin and Ellen DeGeneres as guests, working off a game board loaded with unanswerable questions."

Matt Smith gave QI Live a positive review, calling it "funny, educational, and ... quite interesting"; Smith noted there was a "great deal of Fry worship" and that, due to high ticket prices, "only the most dedicated Fry fans ... would come to this show". He commented that "much like the television show, your enjoyment of the stage version will be affected by how you perceive the guests", but went on to say that he enjoyed the line-up in the show he saw.

=== Awards ===
Year	Ceremony	Category	Outcome	Notes
2004	BAFTA Awards	Best Entertainment Performance; Stephen Fry	Nominated	
2005	BAFTA Awards	Best Entertainment Performance; Stephen Fry	Nominated	
2005	BAFTA Awards	Lew Grade Award; John Lloyd; Ian Lorimer	Nominated	
2006	British Comedy Guide	Best British TV Panel Show/Satire	Won	
2006	Rose d'Or Light Entertainment Festival	Best Game Show Host; Stephen Fry	Won	
2007	British Comedy Guide	Best British TV Panel Show/Satire	Won	
2007	BAFTA Awards	Best Entertainment Performance; Stephen Fry	Nominated	
2007	British Comedy Awards	Lifetime Achievers Award; Stephen Fry	Won	
2007	British Book Awards	TV and Film Book of the Year; The Book of General Ignorance	Nominated	
2008	Royal Television Society	Entertainment	Won	
2008	Royal Television Society	Entertainment Performance	Nominated	
2008	Televisual Bulldog Awards	Best Panel, Quiz or Chat Show	Won	
2008	BAFTA Awards	Best Entertainment Performance; Stephen Fry	Nominated	
2008	British Comedy Awards	Best Comedy Panel Show	Won	
2009	BAFTA Awards	Best Entertainment Performance; Stephen Fry	Nominated	
2009	BAFTA Awards	Best Entertainment Programme	Nominated	
2009	Televisual Bulldog Awards	Best Panel, Quiz or Chat Show	Won	
2010	BAFTA Awards	Best Entertainment Performance; Stephen Fry	Nominated	
2011	BAFTA Awards	Best Entertainment Performance; Stephen Fry	Nominated	
2011	British Comedy Awards	Best Female TV Comic; Sarah Millican	Nominated	
2011	TV Quick Awards	Best Entertainment Show	Nominated	
2011	National Television Awards	Most Popular Entertainment Programme	Nominated	
2012	Comedy.co.uk Award	Best TV Panel Show	Won	
2012	National Television Awards	Most Popular Comedy Panel Show	Nominated	
2013	National Television Awards	Most Popular Comedy Panel Show	Won	
2018	BAFTA Awards	Best Entertainment Performance; Sandi Toksvig	Nominated	

== Media releases ==
QI has entered a number of different media, and has seen an increasing number of tie-in DVDs, books and newspaper columns released since 2005.

=== Books ===
==== United Kingdom ====
The first QI book was 2006's The Book of General Ignorance, published in hardback on 5 October by Faber and Faber. (ISBN 9780571233687) Written by producer and series-creator John Lloyd and QI's head of research, John Mitchinson, it includes a foreword by Fry and "Four words" by Davies ("Will this do, Stephen?".) Most of the book's facts and clarifications have appeared on the programme, including its list of 200 popular misconceptions, many of which featured during the "General Ignorance" rounds. On 8 December 2006, the book "became a surprise bestseller over the Christmas period, becoming Amazon's number one Global bestseller for Christmas 2006." By the end of January 2007, it had sold more than 300,000 copies (and subsequently over half a million), paving the way for subsequent (projected) annual book releases to capitalise on the UK Christmas book market. As of 2008, the Official QI website notes that it will soon be published in 23 countries.

Pocket-sized and audio versions of General Ignorance went on sale the following year. In 2008, a newly revised version was published under the title of The Book of General Ignorance: The Noticeably Stouter Edition. This edition corrected and updated some of the information from the first print, while adding 50 new sections (and extra illustrations) to the original 230. It also included quotes from the series, new "Four Words" by Davies and added a complete episode listing from Series A–F, along with an index.

QI's second book, The Book of Animal Ignorance, was released in the UK (in the same hardback format) by Faber & Faber on 4 October 2007. (ISBN 978-0-571-23370-0) It promised to be a "bestiary for the 21st century," and contains almost completely new quite interesting facts. The book includes "400 diagrams and cartoons by the brilliant Ted Dewan", another Foreword by Stephen Fry and a "Forepaw" by Alan Davies. This publication has also been followed by a pocket-sized version.

On the Factoids feature of the Series A DVD, John Lloyd mentioned an idea he'd had for a QI book of quotations, under the working title Quote Interesting. This book was eventually published in 2008 as Advanced Banter. Similarly, on the Banter feature of the Series B DVD, Lloyd also previewed the title of QI's fourth book, The QI Book of the Dead, which went on sale on 15 October 2009.

7 October 2010 saw the publication of QI's fifth book—The Second Book of General Ignorance. Written by the same authors, this book covers a whole new series of questions on a wide variety of topics, which promises to prove that "everything you think you know is (still) wrong".

The sixth QI book, 1,227 QI Facts To Blow Your Socks Off, a list of facts, was published on 1 November 2012. James Harkin, QI's chief researcher, co-wrote the book with Lloyd and Mitchinson.

QI's first annual, The QI "E" Annual or The QI Annual 2008 was published by Faber and Faber on 1 November 2007, to coincide with the initial airing of the TV show's E series (ISBN 978-0-571-23779-1.) Succeeding years have seen the publication of F, G and H annuals, concurrent with the BBC show's chronology, though retrospective annuals on the first four letters of the alphabet have yet to be published. The covers, which feature various cartoon scenes starring caricatures of Fry and regular QI panellists, are produced by David Stoten (one of Roger Law's Spitting Image team), who also contributed to the annuals' contents. Many of said cover stars are also credited with contributing content to the annuals, which also provide a showcase for Rowan Atkinson's talents as a 'rubber-faced' comic, as well as the comic stylings of Newman and Husband from Private Eye, Viz's Chris Donald, Geoff Dunbar, Ted Dewan and The Daily Telegraph's Matt Pritchett.

==== France ====
A French edition entitled Les autruches ne mettent pas la tête dans le sable : 200 bonnes raisons de renoncer à nos certitudes ("Ostriches don't put their heads in the sand: 200 good reasons to give up our convictions") was published by Dunod on 3 October 2007. (ISBN 978-2-100-51732-9) It is released as part of Dunod's "Cult.Science"/"Oh, les Sciences !" series, which also includes titles by Robert L. Wolke, Ian Stewart and Raymond Smullyan.

==== Italy ====
In 2007, an Italian edition entitled Il libro dell'ignoranza ("The book of ignorance") was published by Einaudi. In 2009, the same publisher published Il libro dell'ignoranza sugli animali ("The book of ignorance about animals".)

==== United States ====
On 7 August 2007, The Book of General Ignorance was published in America by Harmony Books. (ISBN 0-307-39491-3) It features a sparser cover downplaying its links to the TV series, which had yet to be broadcast in the US. The book received glowing reviews from both Publishers Weekly and The New York Times, which recommended it in its "Books Holiday Gift Guide". It entered the New York Times' "Hardcover Advice" best-seller charts at No. 10 on 9 December, falling to No. 11 two weeks later where it stayed until mid-January, before falling out of the top 15 on 20 January.

=== DVDs ===
A number of DVDs related to QI have also been released, including interactive quizzes, and complete series releases.

==== Interactive quizzes ====
In November 2005 an interactive QI DVD game, called QI: A Quite Interesting Game, was released by Warner Vision International. A second interactive game, QI: Strictly Come Duncing followed in November 2007, once again from Warner Vision International. Both games feature Fry asking questions, and then explaining the answers in full QI-mode.

==== Series releases ====
===== United Kingdom =====
A DVD release for the first series was the direct result of an internet petition signed by 1,821 people, which persuaded the BBC of the interest in such a move. Series A, was therefore released by BBC Worldwide's DVD venture, 2 entertain Ltd. in November 2006, as "QI: The Complete First Series." It contains a number of outtakes and the unbroadcast pilot. Sales over the Christmas period, in stark contrast to The Book of General Ignorance, which topped the Amazon.co.uk best-seller list, were not as strong as hoped. A lack of adequate advertising is thought to be to blame (and subsequent episodes of QI have since trailed the DVD), and may have factored in the label change for Series B. Series B was released in March 2008, followed by Series C in September. In 2014, a message on the QI site read "Due to a number of copyright issues there are difficulties releasing further series of QI on DVD".

In December 2015, the Network imprint announced on its website that it had made a deal with FremantleMedia so previously unreleased shows could be made available on DVD sometime in 2016; among the list was QI. The DVD sets, released in May 2017, were split into two initial volumes of series A-D and E-G, containing additional features including a 'Making of' feature, interviews and bloopers. Two additional sets, series H-J and K-M were released in October 2017.

===== Australia =====
A box-set of series 1–3 (Series A-C) was released in September 2011. A single DVD titled "The Best Bits" containing clips from Series G was released in June 2010. In August 2012, a three DVD set labelled as "Series 9" was released, containing the Series H episodes. The Series 9 DVD title was later changed to "The H Series". The Series J was released in March 2014.

===== List of releases =====
Series	No. of Discs	Year	No. of Episodes	Individual releases		Box Set releases	
Series	No. of Discs	Year	No. of Episodes	Region 2	Region 4	Region 2	Region 4
Series A	2	2003	13	6 November 2006	—	Complete Series (A-D) 8 May 2017	Complete Series; 1–3 (A-C) 14 September 2011
Series B	2	2004	12	17 March 2008	—	Complete Series (A-D) 8 May 2017	Complete Series; 1–3 (A-C) 14 September 2011
Series C	2	2005	12	1 September 2008	—	Complete Series (A-D) 8 May 2017	Complete Series; 1–3 (A-C) 14 September 2011
Series D	—	2006	13	—	—	Complete Series (A-D) 8 May 2017	—
Series E	—	2007	13	—	—	Complete Series (E-G) 8 May 2017	—
Series F	—	2008	12	—	—	Complete Series (E-G) 8 May 2017	—
Series G	—	2009–2010	18	—	3 June 2010 (The Best Bits)	Complete Series (E-G) 8 May 2017	—
Series H	3	2010–2011	18	—	2 August 2012 (Note: This DVD was originally released as "Series 9" but later had its name changed to "The H Series".)	Complete Series (H-J) 23 October 2017	—
Series I	3	2011–2012	18	—	—	Complete Series (H-J) 23 October 2017	—
Series J	3	2012–2013	18	—	5 March 2014	Complete Series (H-J) 23 October 2017	—
Series K	—	2013–2014	18	—	—	Complete Series (K-M) 23 October 2017	—
Series L	—	2013–2014	18	—	—	Complete Series (K-M) 23 October 2017	—
Series M	—	2015–2016	18	—	—	Complete Series (K-M) 23 October 2017	—
Series N		2016–2017	18				
Series O		2017–2018	18				
Series P		2018–2019	18				
Series Q		2019–2020	18				
Series R		2020–2021	18				
Series S		2021–2022	16				
Series T		2022–2023	16				
Series U		2023–2024	17				
Series V		2024–2025	16				
Series W		2025–2026	16				

==== Online releases ====
United Kingdom

- The entire show is available to watch on BBC's iPlayer.
- Additionally UKTV Play also offers a number of episodes that have been repeated on Dave on its on-demand service.

United States Multiple services have made QI available to stream in the United States, including Acorn TV (Series A through G - unavailable as of 2024) and Hulu (Series I, J and K).
By April 2024, twelve seasons (series J-U) had been available through BritBox.

=== Other media ===
Since 10 February 2007, a weekly QI column has run in The Daily Telegraph newspaper. Fifty-two columns were planned, originally alphabetically themed like the TV series and running from A to Z twice, but the feature is ongoing and was recently re-launched in the newspaper's Saturday magazine and online. A QI feature has appeared in BBC MindGames magazine since its fifth issue, and revolves around facts and questions in the General Ignorance-mould. A weekly QI-linked multiple-choice question is featured in Radio Times, with the solution printed in the feedback section. QI also has an official website, QI.com, which features facts, forums and other information. It also links to QI's internet show QI News, a parody news show which broadcasts "News" items about things which are "quite interesting". QI News stars Glenn Wrage and Katherine Jakeways as the newsreaders, Bob Squire and Sophie Langton.
