= John Mitchinson (researcher) =

British writer and researcher

- Education: University of Oxford
- Occupations: Author, publisher, broadcaster
- Years active: 1980s–present
- Known for: Head of research for QI; managing director of Quite Interesting Limited; Backlisted Podcast, Unbound
- Website: www.QI.com

John Mitchinson is a British publisher, podcaster and the head of research for the British television panel game QI. He is the managing director of Quite Interesting Limited and co-writer of the QI series of books with the show's creator John Lloyd. The two men are normally referred to as "The Two Johns" and are seen as the main controllers of QI. He also has a column called "The Upsidedown" at the Byline Times.

Mitchinson is cofounder of the international publishing company Unbound, and along with Andy Miller presents Unbound's literature podcast Backlisted ("giving new life to old books"). In March 2025, Unbound went into administration, leaving many of its authors owed thousands of pounds in unpaid royalties. Unbound relaunched as Boundless Publishing and Mitchinson retained his role as Director of the company, having purchased Unbound's assets in a pre-pack sale. In May 2025, he quit Boundless.

== QI ==
Mitchinson acted as an associate producer for the first series. For several years Mitchinson was also director of the "QI Club", which was situated at 16 Turl Street, Oxford. Under his management the building consisted of a bookshop, a café-bar and a vodka bar, as well as a number of rooms devoted to use by the private members club.

== QI books ==
After the success of the QI TV series, Mitchinson co-authored, with QI's creator John Lloyd, the QI Annuals for 2008 and 2009, as well the main QI books, these being The Book of General Ignorance, The Book of Animal Ignorance, Advanced Banter: The QI Book of Quotations, and The QI Book of the Dead.

Mitchinson's most recent QI books were 1,227 QI Facts to Blow Your Socks Off and 1,411 Quite Interesting Facts to Knock You Sideways.

== Backlisted Podcast ==
With Andy Miller, Mitchinson co-presents the Backlisted podcast since 2015 for over 250 episodes. The premise of the podcast is to "give new life to old books" by discussing them.

== Publishing background ==
For the ten years before QI, Mitchinson was a book publisher, running the Harvill Press, Cassell & Co and acting as Deputy Publisher of the Orion Group, now the UK's third largest publisher. Prior to that he spent six years as marketing director of Waterstone’s the booksellers. He is a vice-president of the Hay Festival, a director of Jonathan Burrows contemporary dance group, a Fellow of the RSA and a Trustee of the London Centre for International Storytelling.

== Personal life ==
Mitchinson lives in the Oxfordshire village of Great Tew, where his spare time is spent with his wife and children, raising pigs, chickens, and sheep.
