= John Lloyd (producer) =

British producer and writer (born 1951)

John Lloyd CBE
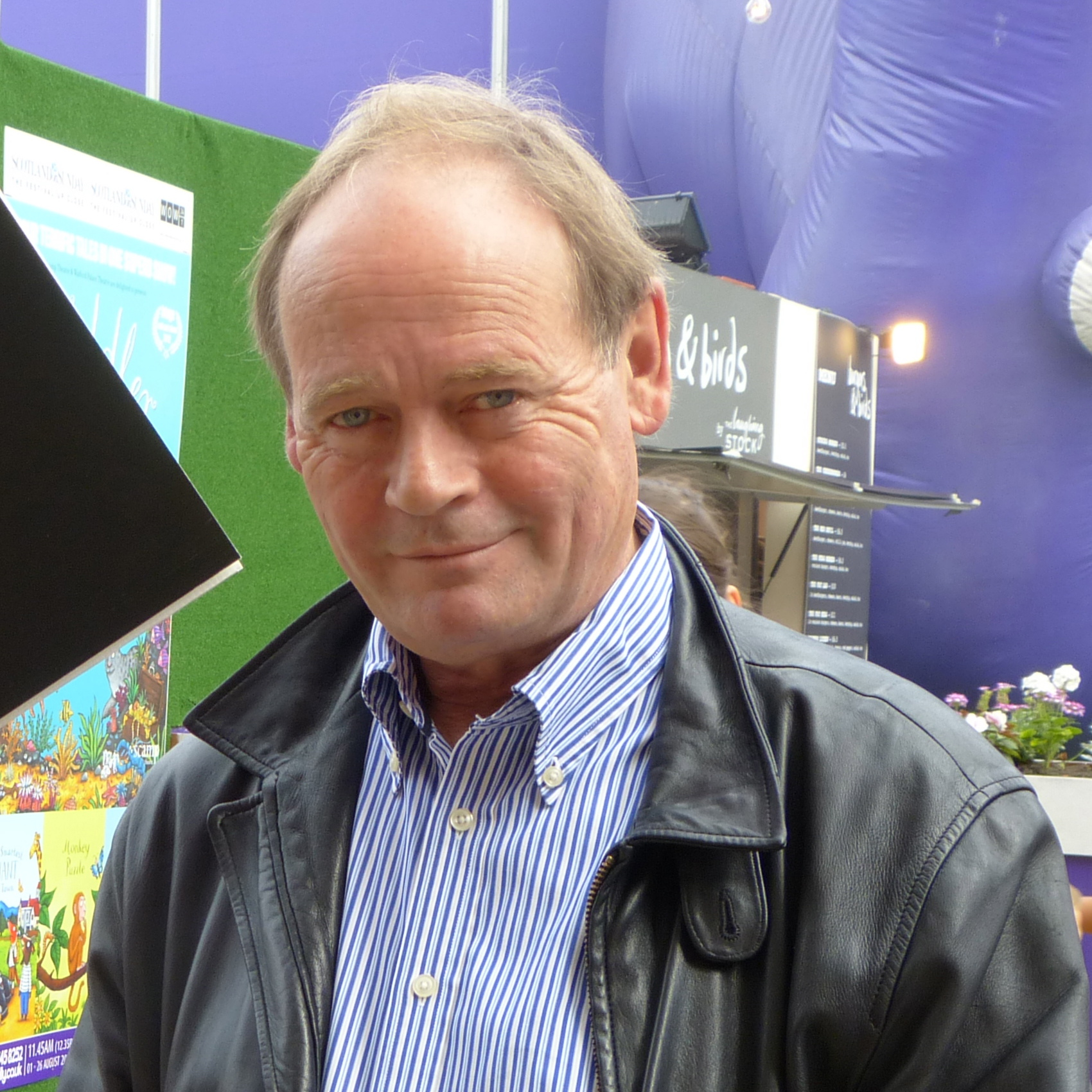
- Lloyd in 2013
- Born: 30 September 1951 (age 75); Dover, Kent, England
- Education: Trinity College, Cambridge (BA)
- Occupations: Author; director; presenter; producer; writer
- Notable work: Not the Nine O'Clock News; The Hitchhiker's Guide to the Galaxy; Spitting Image; Blackadder; QI
- Spouse: Sarah Wallace (m. 1989)
- Children: 3

John Hardress Wilfred Lloyd (born 30 September 1951) is an English producer and writer of television and radio comedy. His television work includes Not the Nine O'Clock News, The Hitchhiker's Guide to the Galaxy, Blackadder, Spitting Image and QI. He presents BBC Radio 4's The Museum of Curiosity.

== Early life ==
John Hardress Wilfred Lloyd was born on 30 September 1951 in Dover, Kent. His father, H. L. "Harpy" Lloyd, was an Anglo-Irish captain with the Royal Navy. As a child, Lloyd lived in several different places, owing to his father's job. This led him to attend school properly only at the age of 9. He was educated at West Hill Park School in Titchfield, Hampshire, a place where he claims bullying was "endemic", and later at The King's School, Canterbury. He read law at Trinity College, Cambridge, and was a member of the Footlights. He became friends with fellow student Douglas Adams, with whom he later worked and shared a flat.

Lloyd is the great nephew of the soldier John Hardress Lloyd.

== Career ==
Lloyd worked as a radio producer at the BBC between 1974 and 1978 creating The News Quiz, The News Huddlines, and Quote... Unquote (with Nigel Rees). He wrote Hordes of the Things (as J. H. W. Lloyd) with Andrew Marshall, co-authored two episodes of Doctor Snuggles with Douglas Adams, and co-wrote the fifth and sixth episodes of the first radio series of The Hitchhiker's Guide to the Galaxy with Adams (Adams wrote all the previous and subsequent episodes solo, as well as the television adaptation). He pitched a story for Doctor Who, The Doomsday Contract, while Adams was script editor of the series, which was never made at the time but eventually became an audio play adapted by Nev Fountain and produced by Big Finish Productions. He also produced series three and four of The Burkiss Way on Radio 4.

Lloyd then worked as a television comedy producer at both the BBC and ITV. As well as being associate producer of The Hitchhiker's Guide to the Galaxy, he created Not the Nine O'Clock News (co-produced with Sean Hardie) and produced Spitting Image. He also produced all four Blackadder series.

Lloyd was originally to have been the host of BBC topical news quiz Have I Got News for You, with the programme initially intended to be called John Lloyd's Newsround. A pilot episode of the show was recorded under this name in mid-1990, with Lloyd hosting alongside team captains Ian Hislop and Paul Merton. Lloyd subsequently decided to pull out of hosting the programme full-time and the pilot episode was never broadcast. Lloyd was replaced by Angus Deayton as host and the show was renamed Have I Got News for You in time for its debut on BBC2 later that year.

Lloyd's first new TV series for 14 years, QI starring Stephen Fry (2003 - 2016), Sandi Toksvig (from 2016 - present) and Alan Davies, began on 11 September 2003 at 10pm on BBC Two for a run of 12 episodes. In its eighth series, which started on BBC One in September 2010, Lloyd appeared as a panellist in one of the episodes. Lloyd has presented the radio series The Museum of Curiosity (2011), which he co-created with producers Richard Turner and Dan Schreiber and former co-host Bill Bailey. In December 2011, Lloyd appeared as captain of the winning Trinity College, Cambridge, team on the Christmas University Challenge.

Lloyd was appointed Commander of the Order of the British Empire (CBE) in the 2011 New Year Honours for services to broadcasting. Lloyd was also awarded an honorary degree from Southampton Solent University.

In August 2014, Lloyd was one of 200 public figures who were signatories to a letter to The Guardian opposing Scottish independence in the run-up to September's referendum on that issue.

Lloyd's book 1,411 Quite Interesting Facts to Knock You Sideways, a collaboration with John Mitchinson and James Harkin, was published in 2014 by Faber and Faber.

== Personal life ==
Lloyd married Sarah Wallace in 1989, with whom he has three children.

== Influences ==
In a 2016 interview with the spiritual Beshara Magazine, Lloyd talked about the process of self-knowledge, and explained his interest in the Indian guru Nisargadatta Maharaj's book I Am That and in Sufi mysticism, particularly the works of the writer, thinker and Sufi teacher Idries Shah. On BBC radio's Desert Island Discs, he chose The Book: On the Taboo Against Knowing Who You Are, by Alan Watts.

== Awards ==
Awarding Body/Event	Awarded
BAFTA Television Awards	1989 Best Comedy Series, for Blackadder Goes Forth; 1987 Comedy Series, for Blackadder; 1980 Light Entertainment Programme, for Not the Nine O'Clock News

== Books ==
- Not! The Nine O'Clock News
- Not 1982 (Calendar)
- Not 1983 (Calendar)
- Not the Royal Wedding
- Not the General Election
- The Meaning of Liff (1983, with Douglas Adams)
- The Deeper Meaning of Liff (1990, with Douglas Adams)
- The Appallingly Disrespectful Spitting Image Book
- Spitting Image
- Blackadder: The Whole Damn Dynasty 1485–1917 (2000, with Richard Curtis, Rowan Atkinson and Ben Elton)
- The Book of General Ignorance (2006, with John Mitchinson and the QI Elves)
- The Book of Animal Ignorance (2007, with John Mitchinson and the QI Elves)
- The QI Annual E [editor] (2007, with various authors)
- Advanced Banter (2008, with John Mitchinson and the QI Elves)
- The QI Annual F [co-editor] (2008, with John Mitchinson [co-editor] and various authors)
- The QI Annual G [editor] (2009, with various authors)
- The QI Book of the Dead (2009, with John Mitchinson and the QI Elves)
- If Ignorance is Bliss, Why Aren't There More Happy People? Smart Quotes for Dumb Times (2009, with John Mitchinson)
- The Second Book of General Ignorance (2010, with John Mitchinson and the QI Elves)
- 1,227 QI Facts To Blow Your Socks Off (2012, with John Mitchinson, James Harkin and the QI Elves)
- Afterliff (2013, with Jon Canter)
- 1,339 QI Facts To Make Your Jaw Drop (2013, with John Mitchinson, James Harkin and the QI Elves)
- 1,411 QI Facts To Knock You Sideways (2014, with John Mitchinson, James Harkin and the QI Elves)
- 1,234 QI Facts to Leave You Speechless (2015, with John Mitchinson, James Harkin and the QI Elves)
- The Third Book of General Ignorance (2015, with John Mitchinson, James Harkin, Andrew Hunter Murray and the QI Elves)
- 1,342 QI Facts To Leave You Flabbergasted (2016, with John Mitchinson, James Harkin, Anne Miller and the QI Elves)
- 1,423 QI Facts to Bowl You Over (2017, with John Mitchinson, James Harkin, Anne Miller and the QI Elves)
- 2,024 QI Facts To Stop You in Your Tracks (2018, with James Harkin, Anne Miller and the QI Elves)
- Funny You Should Ask... Your Questions Answered by the QI Elves (2020, with the QI Elves)
- Funny You Should Ask... Again (2021, with the QI Elves)
