= The Book of General Ignorance =

2006 nonfiction book

- Cover of the first UK edition
- Author: John Lloyd; John Mitchinson
- Illustrator: Mr. Bingo
- Language: English
- Subject: Trivia
- Publisher: Faber and Faber
- Publication date: 5 October 2006
- Publication place: United Kingdom
- Media type: Hardback
- Pages: 282
- ISBN: 0-307-39491-3
- Followed by: The Book of Animal Ignorance

The Book of General Ignorance is the first in a series of books based on the final round in the intellectual British panel game QI, written by series-creator John Lloyd and head-researcher John Mitchinson, to help spread the QI philosophy of curiosity to the reading public. It is a trivia book, aiming to address and address many of the misconceptions, mistakes and misunderstandings in 'common knowledge'—it is therefore known not as a 'General Knowledge' book, but as 'General Ignorance'.

As well as correcting these "all-too-common" mistakes, the book(s) attempt to explain how the errors have been perpetuated, and why people believe incorrect 'facts' to be true.

== Publication history ==
First published by Faber and Faber in Britain on 19 October 2006, The Book of General Ignorance was published in the United States (on 7 August 2007 by Harmony Books), in France as Les autruches ne mettent pas la tête dans le sable: 200 bonnes raisons de renoncer à nos certitudes (on 3 October 2007 by Dunod) and in the Netherlands as Het grote boek van foute feiten (on 1 November 2007 by Uitgeverij Forum). A surprise Christmas 2006 best-seller in the UK, the book became "Amazon's number one Global bestseller for Christmas 2006." By the end of January 2007 it had sold more than 300,000 copies, and later passed half a million. Unexpectedly high sales led to a sequel and an annual.

In the United States the book received good reviews from both Publishers Weekly, and the New York Times, who recommended it in their "Books Holiday Gift Guide". It has a different cover (above ) to the UK edition, downplaying links with the QI TV series which had not been shown in North America. The book remained in the top 15 places on the New York Times Best Seller list for "Hardcover Advice" books from 9 December 2007 to 13 January 2008.

== Background ==
The title "General Ignorance", chosen both to emulate and parody general knowledge quizzes, was first used to describe the final round of the panel game QI, which was created by Lloyd and had Mitchinson as head researcher. Appearing initially in the unbroadcast pilot (subsequently available on DVD), the round has varied little in content and style since, although the questions became slightly more obtuse. From the start the round consisted of several deliberately misleading questions which appear to have obvious answers that are actually inaccurate (for example, aircraft black boxes are in fact orange, for visibility.) The pilot also introduced the concept of penalising answers that were overly predictable, especially obvious jokes: one such question in the pilot was, "What is the sixth most popular name for a baby boy in Germany?" The answer to the question is, in fact, "Tim". However, QI's regular panellist Alan Davies answered with the jokey suggestion "Adolph", allowing host Stephen Fry to produce a prepared piece of card reading "Adolph," whereupon the obvious-but-inaccurate answer was revealed to carry a penalty score of −10 points. When the pilot was shown to the then-controller of BBC Two (Jane Root), it was this feature that particularly caught her attention, and penalties remained a regular feature throughout the first nine series of the programme. Due to the nature of the questions in the final round, however, the majority of penalties would always be awarded during "General Ignorance".

While most episodes are structured around a theme topic beginning with the Series' initial letter (each Series is alphabetically structured, with Series 5 being "E", etc.), "General Ignorance" contains questions on a range of diverse subjects, linked only by common misunderstanding. Occasionally the round differs, in particular during the Christmas specials. During the course of the "B" Series special, Fry and Davies swapped places for "General Ignorance", with Fry attempting to answer questions ostensibly written by Davies to stump him. During "D"s Christmas Special, all the "GI" questions revolved around saints.

== Structure ==
The Book of General Ignorance contains a list of 230 questions, most of which previously appeared in episodes of QI. Each question explains the correct answer, and usually attempts to show why people tend to make the wrong assumptions, or believe certain myths. Each book contains two forewords, one by Fry, the other by Davies. Davies' initial "foreword" was credited as "Four words," which read simply: "Will this do, Stephen?"

== Critical reception ==
An earlier version of the cover, playing on the idea of ignorance with a typo

Response to the book has been mostly positive, both critically and commercially. Critic Jennifer Kay said, "The Book of General Ignorance won't make you feel dumb. It's really a call to be more curious." Liesl Schillinger in The New York Times praised the book for gathering "so much repeatable wisdom […] in one place," asking the rhetorical question of interested parties—"In the Information Age, can you afford to remain ignorant of these precious factoids?"

Doug Brown reviewed the book for Powell's Books, noting that it has a "UK-heavy emphasis", and that "Overall The Book of General Ignorance is a lot of fun, and you're guaranteed to learn something you didn't know (but thought you did)." Aileen Marshall rates it with the maximum five stars for the Librarian Book Review at TeensPoint.org, writing:

This book is just fun to read, alone or with your spouse or friends. And it broadens your horizon. Even if you don't plan on attending a trivia-gameshow anytime soon, your newly acquired knowledge will be beneficial when the need for smalltalk arises.

The book was favourably reviewed in other places, among them such American newspapers as the Los Angeles Times, Monsters and Critics, USA Today, Seattle Times, Chicago Sun-Times and Seattle Post-Intelligencer. However, some reviews were critical; Kirsten Garrett suggested in her review that, The Book of General Ignorance "is in danger of being too smart for its own good. In fact, a bit smart-arse." She also noted that "It's a disgrace that in a book of this kind there is no index. It's not possible to look up a subject about which you are ignorant".

Marcus Berkmann drew attention to the over-abundance of similarly themed books (to which the QI title—and series—clearly owe a certain debt), commenting that:

A book of the show has become all but necessary, if only to allow us to ingest this information at normal brain speed, and because such fine and creative research genuinely deserves to be captured in print. So it's slightly disappointing that the book arrives in the question-and-answer format made so familiar by last year's big hit Does Anything Eat Wasps? There are actually about 20 such books out this year, all asking these quirky questions (Do Sheep Shrink in the Rain? Do Fish Drink Water?), all piled up in Waterstones, making book-buyers feel a bit depressed.

Berkman's complaints, however, are countered by his admission that "this book is already the amusing trivia success of the season," containing many "eye-watering" and "eyebrow-raising" facts, even if he thinks it a little smug.

Both the "question and answer" format and indexing issues were addressed for the follow-up The Book of Animal Ignorance, which had an alphabetised structure (with contents page), and stand-alone facts, rather than responses.

== Sequels ==
A "Pocket edition" of The Book of General Ignorance was published on 3 April 2008. A second book in the series, The Book of Animal Ignorance, was released in the UK a year after The Book of General Ignorance, on 4 October 2007. An audiobook adaptation called The Sound of General Ignorance was scripted and read by the authors on 4 November 2008. On 25 December 2008 an extended version of the book, entitled The Noticeably Stouter Edition, was published to coincide with QI moving to BBC One. This new version included new facts, quotes from the show, a list of all the episodes made at the time, an index, and a new collection of "Four words" from Davies.

On 1 November 2007 another QI spin-off title was produced: The QI annual, intended as a continuing work focusing on the Series' alphabetic themes. The annual featured contributions from most of "QI"s guest panellists and the comedian Rowan Atkinson. In 2010 the second book of General Ignorance was released.

== See also ==
- List of common misconceptions
