= Dragon Gate =

Dragon Gate may refer to:

- Dragon gate (architecture), architectural feature in Hong Kong skyscrapers
- Dragon Gate (mythology), Chinese myth where carp turn into dragons by leaping up a waterfall
- Dragon Gate (San Francisco), gateway to San Francisco's Chinatown
- Dragon Gate (Sweden), business/cultural center in Sweden
- Dragon Gate, gate at the Great Mosque of Kufa
- Dragon Gate Taoism, sect of Taoism
- Dragon Gate Team, former professional League of Legends team in Hong Kong
- Dragongate, Japanese wrestling promotion
  - Dragon Gate USA, American expansion of Dragongate
  - Team Dragon Gate, former pro wrestling tag team of Genki Horiguchi and Masato Yoshino in the defunct WSX
- Dragon's Gate, video game
- Dragon's Gate (novel), by Laurence Yep

== See also ==
- Longmen (disambiguation), dragon gate in Chinese
