= The Museum of Curiosity =

British radio panel game show

- Other names: The Professor of Curiosity (unbroadcast pilot)
- Genre: talk show
- Running time: 30 minutes
- Country of origin: United Kingdom
- Language: English
- Home station: BBC Radio 4
- Starring: John Lloyd; Bill Bailey (Series 1); Sean Lock (Series 2); Jon Richardson (Series 3); Dave Gorman (Series 4); Jimmy Carr (Series 5); Humphrey Ker (Series 6); Phill Jupitus (Series 7); Sarah Millican (Series 8); Noel Fielding (Series 9); Jo Brand (Series 10); Romesh Ranganathan (Series 11); Sally Phillips (Series 12); Lee Mack (Series 13); Bridget Christie (Series 14); Alice Levine (Series 15); Holly Walsh (series 16); Anna Ptaszynski (series 17)
- Created by: John Lloyd; Dan Schreiber; Richard Turner
- Produced by: Richard Turner; Dan Schreiber; James Harkin; Anne Miller; Victoria Lloyd
- Original release: 20 February 2008 – 27 March 2023
- No. of series: 17
- No. of episodes: 106 + 1 unbroadcast pilot
- Opening theme: Bill Bailey (Series 1); House of Strange (Series 2 onwards)
- Ending theme: Bill Bailey (Series 1); House of Strange (Series 2 onwards)
- Website: BBC Homepage

The Museum of Curiosity is a comedy talk show on BBC Radio 4 that was first broadcast on 20 February 2008. It is hosted by John Lloyd. He acts as the head of the fictional titular museum, while a panel of three guests – typically a comedian, an author and an academic – each donate to the museum an 'object' that fascinates them. The radio medium ensures that the suggested exhibits can be absolutely anything, limited only by the guests' imaginations.

Each series has had a different co-host, under the title of curator of the museum. Bill Bailey acted as co-host of the programme in the first series, whilst Sean Lock, Jon Richardson, Dave Gorman, Jimmy Carr, Humphrey Ker, Phill Jupitus, Sarah Millican, Noel Fielding, Jo Brand, Romesh Ranganathan, Sally Phillips, Lee Mack, Bridget Christie, Alice Levine, Holly Walsh and Anna Ptaszynski have all assumed the role in later series. Gorman also stood in for Richardson for one episode of the third series, after Richardson was stranded due to the eruption of Eyjafjallajökull. Ker also functioned as a stand-in, this time for Jimmy Carr, when Carr was unable to attend one episode in series 5.

The programme has often been compared to the television panel game QI. Both were co-created by Lloyd, several of the Museum's 'curators' and comic guests have appeared regularly on QI, and the QI Elves (QI's research team, who provide hosts Stephen Fry and Sandi Toksvig with live information as required during the programme) provide the research. As a result, some critics consider the radio show to be a spin-off of the TV programme, and some have further ventured that The Museum of Curiosity is not as good as its forerunner. Most reviews of The Museum of Curiosity, however, are positive.

In May 2025 Lloyd confirmed that the show had been cancelled after 17 series and 106 episodes.

== Format ==
In series one, the programme began with Bailey introducing the show and playing its theme tune, which he performed in a slightly different way in each episode. In subsequent series, the theme tune was, instead, performed by House of Strange Studios of East London. The host/professor and the curator/sidekick introduce themselves. They then give a short guide to the museum, followed by the introduction of the "advisory committee", a guest panel made up of celebrities and academic experts, during which Lloyd reads their CVs aloud. This introductory section takes up about half the programme.

Then, each member of the "committee" donates something to the museum. The donation can be anything, regardless of its size, cost, tangibility, or even existence. Examples of donations include a yeti, the Battle of Waterloo, and absolutely nothing. Lloyd and the curator then decide what form the exhibit could take and where in the museum it could be displayed. In series one, the programme ended either with Lloyd and Bailey reading audience suggestions for additional exhibits or asking the audience curious questions. Bailey ended the show by giving a humorous comment on a Bertrand Russell quote. Both of these ideas were dropped in series two.

From series two onward, the show has maintained a standard format. It is presented in two halves; in the first half, Lloyd and the curator introduce the three guests, provide an explanation of who they are, and the five engage in a general discussion. In the second half, the curator declares the Museum open for donations, and each guest explains what they wish to "donate" to the museum (again, as the museum is fictional, nothing is actually exchanged, though guests occasionally bring real objects to discuss). Questioning of all three guests ensures that everyone says something about each donation.

== Production ==
The programme's pilot episode was recorded on 16 April 2007 and was entitled The Professor of Curiosity. The guests for this episode were Alastair Fothergill, Victoria Finlay and Simon Munnery. This pilot, recorded at the Rutherford Room at the institute of Physics, has not been broadcast. The first series was recorded at the Pleasance Theatre in Islington and, since then, the show has been recorded at the BBC Radio Theatre, with occasional recordings at other venues, such as the Shaw Theatre and RADA Studios (formerly The Drill Hall), all in London. The series was created by Lloyd, Richard Turner and Dan Schreiber. The show is produced by Anne Miller. The show's researchers are Mike Turner, Lydia Mizon and Emily Jupitus of QI.

A live version of the show was staged at the Natural History Museum, London on 9 November 2012 for charity. The guests for this edition were Terry Pratchett, Dave Gorman, Alan West, Baron West of Spithead, Helen Keen, Richard Fortey and Erica McAlister. The show was hosted by John Lloyd, with Producer Dan Schreiber taking the role of curator.

Further live shows were staged at the 2014 Edinburgh Fringe featuring a number of top comedians and other guests.

Series 15 and Series 16 were recorded remotely during 2020 and 2021 because of the COVID-19 pandemic.

== Episodes ==
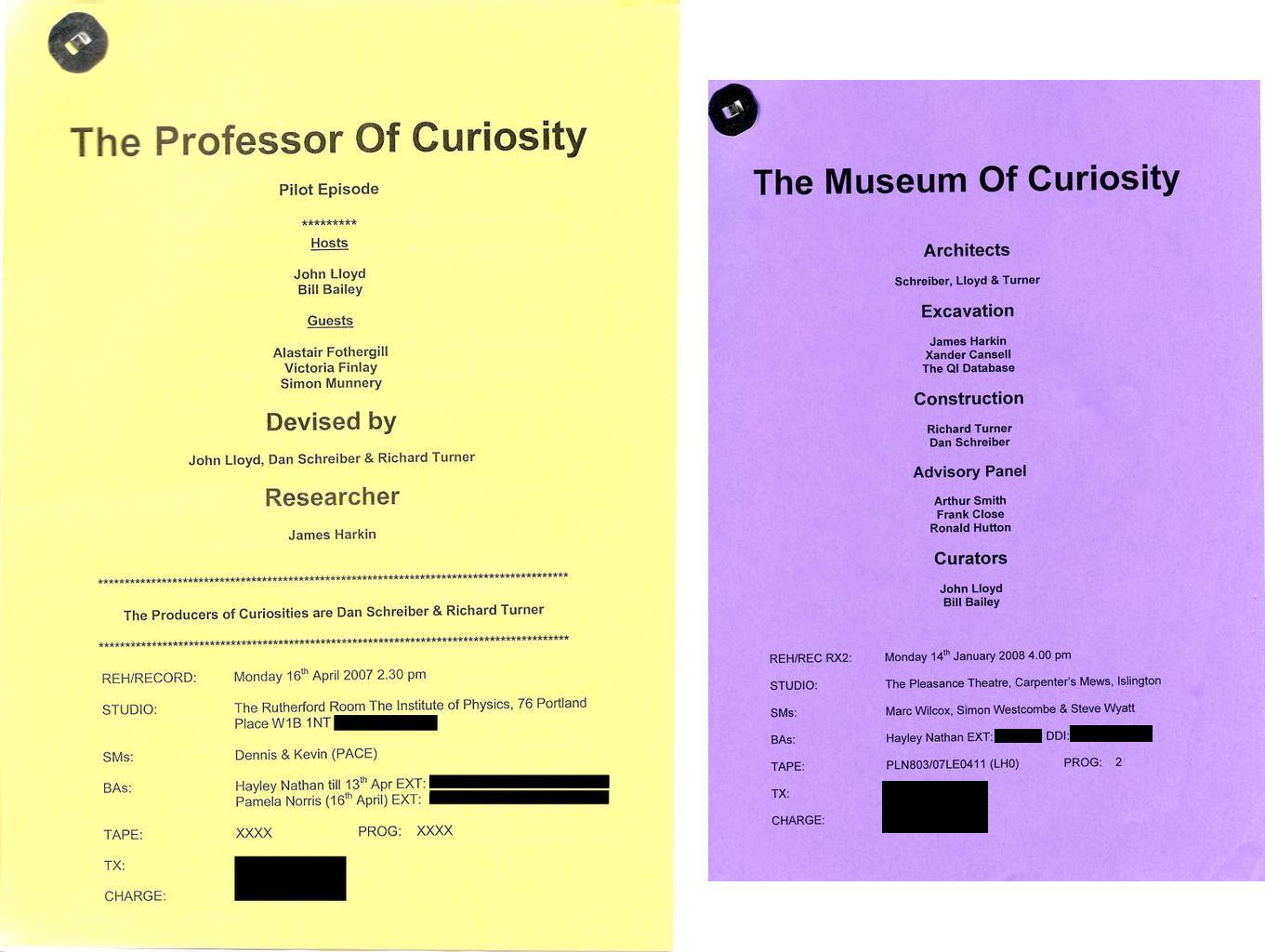
The front covers of the scripts for The Professor of Curiosity and episode three of The Museum of Curiosity.

=== Series 1 ===
Episode	Air date	Advisory committee	Exhibits donated
1	20 February 2008	Richard Fortey; Brian Blessed; Sean Lock	The giant hornet of Chang Jiang. (Fortey); Curators of the Natural History Museum. (Fortey); A yeti or Sasquatch. (Blessed); The modern scarf knot, or the "Sean Lock neck knot". (Lock)
2	27 February 2008	Fran Beauman; Gary Sheffield; Ben Elton	A pineapple (Beauman); Anderson Shelters (Sheffield); Privacy (Elton)
3	5 March 2008	Arthur Smith; Frank Close; Ronald Hutton	Arthur Cravan (Smith); Nothing (Close); Father Christmas (Hutton)
4	12 March 2008	Victoria Finlay; Kevin Day; Alastair Fothergill	Pliny the Elder (Finlay); The Battle of Waterloo (Day); A hairy anglerfish (Fothergill)
5	19 March 2008	Jonathan Miller; Philip Ball; Marcus du Sautoy	The Nottingham Alabasters (Miller); Phlogiston (Ball); The Monster (du Sautoy)
6	26 March 2008	John Gribbin; Alan Davies; Martha Reeves	The Big Bang (Gribbin); Epping Forest (Davies); Silence (Reeves)

=== Series 2 ===
Episode	Air date	Advisory committee	Exhibits donated
1	4 May 2009	Chris Donald; Brian Eno; Dave Gorman	A British Railways bridge plate (Donald); Grímsvötn (Eno); The urge to press red buttons that you know you shouldn't press (Gorman)
2	11 May 2009	Gavin Pretor-Pinney; Simon Singh; Tim FitzHigham	A Kelvin–Helmholtz cloud (Pretor-Pinney); The Holmdel Horn Antenna (Singh); Don Quixote (FitzHigham)
3	18 May 2009	Bettany Hughes; Chris Addison; Rupert Sheldrake	Helen of Troy (Hughes); Alan Shepard's six iron (Addison); A sheep rolling over a cattlegrid (Sheldrake)
4	25 May 2009	Charlotte Uhlenbroek; John Hodgman; Oliver James	A chimpanzee rain dance (Uhlenbroek); Complete world knowledge (Hodgman); Matt Ridley's nameplate from his office door at Northern Rock (James)
5	1 June 2009	Kate Adie; Jon Richardson; Roger Law	The Holy Grail (Adie); Hannah Hauxwell (Richardson); The perfect English Spot rabbit (Law)
6	8 June 2009	Clive James; Tim Minchin; Philip Pullman	A P-51 Mustang (James); Tempting fate (Minchin); Inventions being used for things they were not designed for (Pullman)

=== Series 3 ===
Episode	Air date	Advisory committee	Exhibits donated
1	10 May 2010	Marcus Chown; Terry Pratchett; Shappi Khorsandi	The Omega Point (Chown); A procrastinator (Pratchett); Charlie Chaplin (Khorsandi)
2	17 May 2010 (Note: Richardson was unable to attend the recording as he was stranded in Australia due to the air travel disruption after the 2010 Eyjafjallajökull eruption. His role was taken over for the show by Dave Gorman.)	Suggs; Ruth Padel; Leigh Francis	The Great Exhibition (Suggs); 10,000 tigers (Padel); Spider-Man (Francis)
3	24 May 2010	Richard Wiseman; Kevin Eldon; Jon Ronson	The Milgram Experiment (Wiseman); The ten worlds (Eldon); A gay bomb (Ronson)
4	31 May 2010	Michael Welland; Sarah Bakewell; Simon Evans	Singing sand dunes (Welland); Michel de Montaigne's medallion (Bakewell); A total eclipse (Evans)
5	7 June 2010 (Note: For this episode, the museum was looking for "new members of staff", so all the donations were curious people.)	Ronni Ancona; Daniel Tammet; Robin Hanbury-Tenison	Barry Marshall (Ancona); Humphry Davy (Ancona); Saul Bellow (Tammet); Nyapun, a Penan hunter-gatherer (Hanbury-Tenison)
6	14 June 2010	Sarah Millican; David Eagleman; Neil Gaiman	Pictures of animals in clothes (Millican); International Ignorance Day (Eagleman); Jack Benny's vault (Gaiman)

=== Series 4 ===
Episode	Air date	Advisory committee	Exhibits donated
1	3 October 2011	Francesca Stavrakopoulou; Alex Bellos; Jimmy Carr	God (Stavrakopoulou); A Curta calculator (Bellos); A book containing all the jokes in the world (Carr)
2	10 October 2011	Graham Linehan; Helen Scales; Rory Sutherland	A cassette tape (Linehan); A tank full of seahorses (Scales); A single Shreddie shown from angle of 45° (Sutherland)
3	17 October 2011	Roger Highfield; Robin Ince; Gareth Edwards	An invisibility cloak (Highfield); The essential trifle (Ince); The first story ever told (Edwards)
4	24 October 2011	David McCandless; Natalie Haynes; David Crystal	The super-ego (McCandless); TV detectives (Haynes); A waffle generator (Crystal)
5	31 October 2011	Alain de Botton; Sara Wheeler; Alex Horne	A High Street psychotherapist (de Botton); A carved walrus baculum (Wheeler); The word "dord" (Horne)
6	7 November 2011	Lucie Green; Harry Enfield; Alan West	An invisible coronal mass ejection (Green); A stupid German (Enfield); A tot of rum (West)

=== Series 5 ===
Episode	Air date	Advisory committee	Exhibits donated
1	1 October 2012	Erica McAlister; Al Murray; Jan Bondeson	A cow pat (McAlister); A travellator (Murray); A security coffin (Bondeson)
2	8 October 2012	Stuart Clark; Tom Hart Dyke; Jo Brand	Johannes Kepler's drink dispenser (Clark); Puya raimondii (Hart Dyke); Childhood, represented by a badly knitted jumper made by your nan. (Brand)
3	15 October 2012	Humphrey Ker; Dr. Pamela Stephenson-Connolly; Prof. Sir Andre Geim	Chrétien de Troyes, inventor of chivalry (Ker); The object of desire (Stephenson-Connolly); The ghost of curiosity (Geim)
4	22 October 2012	Frank Cottrell Boyce; Dr. Alice Roberts; Andy Nyman	St. Columba's Psalter (Cottrell Boyce); The love child of a modern human and a Neanderthal (Roberts); Friday the 13th Part III 3-D (Nyman)
5	29 October 2012	Dr. Helen Czerski; Irving Finkel; Sean Hughes	A bubble (Czerski); An authentic portrait of Jane Austen (Finkel); A tab of LSD (Hughes)
6	5 November 2012	Dr. Buzz Aldrin; Marc Abrahams; Sara Pascoe	Aldrin Mars cycler (Aldrin); The reports of Professor John Trinkaus on his pet peeves (Abrahams); User-friendly poisons, such as Botox (Pascoe)

=== Series 6 ===
Episode	Air date	Advisory committee	Exhibits donated
1	30 September 2013	John Blashford-Snell; Mark Watson; Joann Fletcher	Henry Morton Stanley's compass (Blashford-Snell); Mark Watson's glasses (Watson); A silver denarius struck to celebrate the Battle of Actium found in Barnsley. (Fletcher)
2	7 October 2013	Andrew O'Neill; Amanda Palmer; Volker Sommer	A third class ticket on the London Necropolis Railway (O'Neill); A living statue (Palmer); A dozen defecated ant heads. (Sommer)
3	14 October 2013	Howard Stringer; Jane Bussmann; Richard Ingrams	A sandbag (Stringer); A funnyometer (Bussmann); A machine to give judges electric shocks if they slept in court (Ingrams)
4	21 October 2013	Richard Herring; Kristen Lippincott; Christofer Clemente	Grigori Rasputin (Herring); A eureka moment (Lippincott); A lizard popping a wheelie (Clemente)
5	28 October 2013	Robert Llewellyn; Cleo Rocos; Kevin Warwick	An elm tree. (Llewellyn); A field of agave plants. (Rocos); A thinking machine (Warwick)
6	4 November 2013	Paul Sinha; Maggie Aderin-Pocock; David Frost (Note: This episode was broadcast after Frost's death on 31 August 2013.)	C. B. Fry's mantelpiece (Sinha); The Prospero satellite (Aderin-Pocock); The Nixon Interviews (Frost)

=== Series 7 ===
Episode	Air date	Advisory committee	Exhibits donated
1	6 October 2014	Jimmy Wales; Helen Keen; Kees Moeliker	A mobile phone in 2019 that will cost £10 to buy in Kenya (Wales); The Jack Parsons Moon crater (Keen); A single pubic louse (Moeliker)
2	13 October 2014	Kevin Dutton; Sandra Knapp; Richard Osman	A smile (Dutton); Chuño (Knapp); A bar of Cadbury's Dairy Milk (Osman)
3	20 October 2014	Sandi Toksvig; Will Storr; Lieven Scheire	The alphabet (Toksvig); Some type of tiny wasps (Storr); A parasitic wasp (Scheire)
4	27 October 2014	Rich Hall; Anna Keay; Henry Marsh	The front porch (Hall); St. Edward's Crown (Keay); A sea squirt's brain (Marsh)
5	3 November 2014	Clive Anderson; Anne Dudley; Richard Williams	The Old Bailey (Anderson); The Woolsack (Dudley); A Disney desk (Williams)
6	10 November 2014	Neil Innes; Bradley Garrett; Isabel Behncke Izquierdo	The Institute of Cognitive Stupidity (Innes); London's hidden rivers (Garrett); A laughing tree (Behncke Izquierdo)

=== Coding Special ===
Air date	Advisory committee	Exhibits donated
10 September 2015	Sydney Padua; Eben Upton; Matt Parker	The Analytical Engine (Padua); A BBC Micro (Upton); A Williams–Kilburn tube (Parker)

=== Series 8 ===
Episode	Air date	Advisory committee	Exhibits donated
1	11 January 2016	Holly Walsh; David Bramwell; Stephen J. Dubner	The Vows of the Peacock (Walsh); Part of a time machine made by the Federation of Damanhur (Bramwell); A microchip implanted into a human brain that could read all thoughts (Dubner)
2	18 January 2016	Greg Jenner; Hannah Fry; Ken Dodd	The Eighteenth Amendment to the United States Constitution (Jenner); The equation for the perfect marriage (Fry); William Shakespeare's chucklemuscle (Dodd)
3	25 January 2016	Henry Blofeld; Helen Sharman; Felicity Ward	P. G. Wodehouse (Blofeld); The Deep Space Climate Observatory (Sharman); A toilet (Ward)
4	1 February 2016	Tim Smit; Doris Vickers; Rufus Hound	The New Emperor's new clothes, which change colour when you lie (Smit); A star clock (Vickers); The monkey mirror (Hound)
5	8 February 2016	William Hartston; Sophie Scott; Matt Lucas	A black pawn on top of an entire of pile of chess pieces balancing on top of a rook (Hartston); A human tongue (Scott); A fart (Lucas)
6	15 February 2016	Lucy Cooke; Adam Lowe; Susan Calman	A pygmy sloth (Cooke); A Lucida 3D laser scanner (Lowe); Fifty Shades of Grey (Calman)

=== Series 9 ===
Episode	Air date	Advisory committee	Exhibits donated
1	29 July 2016	Howard Goodall; Rachel Armstrong; Nish Kumar	A pantalon (Goodall); A witch bottle (Armstrong); Blonde on Blonde (Kumar)
2	5 August 2016	Janey Godley; Milton Wainwright; Corey Taylor	Some random dogs that wandered the streets in the 1970s (Godley); A box used to detect microscopic alien life in the stratosphere. (Wainwright); A deep fried wing of the Museum. (Taylor)
3	12 August 2016	Susie Dent; Mike Shanahan; Ross Noble	A fly on the wall in a meeting between Francis Grose and Samuel Johnson (Dent).; Some wild fig trees (Shanahan).; Rarajipari (Noble).
4	19 August 2016	Tristram Wyatt; Vic Reeves; Kate Williams	A voucher for the as-yet-undiscovered human pheromone. (Wyatt); An albino lapwing used by Sir Mick Jagger in 1966. (Reeves); A Cottingley fairy. (Williams)
5	26 August 2016	Janina Ramirez; Peter Frankopan; Jenny Colgan	Hildegard of Bingen. (Ramirez); A retro 1970s spice rack. (Frankopan); Narnia red. (Colgan)
6	2 September 2016	George Monbiot; Katie Birkwood; Craig Brown	A short-faced bear (Monbiot); A Treatise on Astronomy by Gerolamo Cardano. (Birkwood); Crossroads Motel. (Brown)

=== Series 10 ===
Episode	Air date	Advisory committee	Exhibits donated
1	9 January 2017	Helen Arney; Thomas Thwaites; Aseem Hashmi	The 4 newest chemical elements: Nh, Mc, Ts, Og (Arney); A history book published in 2222AD (Thwaites); A ship's anchor (Hasmi)
2	16 January 2017	Lucy Porter; Mark Forsyth; Dave Trott	Lycra (Porter); A wayzgoose (Forsyth); A ploughman's lunch (Trott)
3	23 January 2017	Amber Butchart; Jack Waley-Cohen; Jimeoin	The colour mauve (Butchart); A book of Tom Swifties (Waley-Cohen); The speed of cheese (Jimeoin)
4	30 January 2017	Sofie Hagen; Jon Ablett; Kate Fox	The manifesto for the rules of Dogme 95 (Hagen); A snail glued to a board (Ablett); Stone age selfies (Fox)
5	6 February 2017	Deborah Frances-White; Dave Goulson; Tony Robinson	Emilia Lanier (Frances-White); A pair of virgin deathwatch beetles (Goulson); A war memorial depicting the finale of Blackadder Goes Forth (Robinson)
6	13 February 2017	Henry Eliot; Bee Wilson; Michelle Wolf	Longplayer (Eliot); The smell of coffee (Wilson); CNN (Wolf)

=== Series 11 ===
Episode	Air date	Advisory committee	Exhibits donated
1	28 July 2017	Cally Beaton; Sally Phillips; Suzy Lishman	The population of The Netherlands. (Beaton); A knitted tea cosy to cover the museum. (Phillips); An exact replica of the foot bones of Richard III. (Lishman)
2	4 August 2017	Phill Jupitus; Roger Graef; Prue Leith	A Siouxsie and the Banshees concert at Chelmsford Odeon on Sunday 26 July 1981. (Jupitus); The theory of deterrence (Graef); Alexis Soyer (Leith)
3	11 August 2017	Rainer Hersch; Beth Healey; Kaffe Fassett	A descant recorder (Hersch); The International Space Station (Healey); The Watts Towers (Fassett)
4	18 August 2017	Cariad Lloyd; Amanda Owen; Gyles Brandreth	A Moomin (Lloyd); A shepherd's whistle (Owen); A button from the actor Donald Wolfit's King Lear costume (Brandreth)
5	25 August 2017	Clive Oppenheimer; Penny Rose; Francis Wheen	A small tin of magma (Oppenheimer); A skirt lifter (Rose); A much-misinterpreted letter from Darwin to Marx (Wheen)
6	1 September 2017	Andy Miller; Kathy Lette; Stephen Fry	A burst balloon and an empty honey pot (Miller); The maternal instinct (Lette); A bunch of grapes (Fry)

=== Series 12 ===
Episode	Air date	Advisory committee	Exhibits donated
1	8 January 2018	Nikki Bedi; Pete Brown; Rory Bremner	Ganesha (Bedi); The Moon Under Water (Brown); "Mad Jack" Churchill (Bremner)
2	15 January 2018	Joe Lycett; Tom Shakespeare; Konnie Huq	A half-folded towel (Lycett); Georges Couthon's rolling chair / wheelchair (Shakespeare); A Blue Peter badge (Huq)
3	22 January 2018	Stephen K. Amos; Victoria Hislop; Suze Kundu	Tooting Broadway tube station (Amos); The mati (Hislop); Kevlar (Kundu)
4	29 January 2018	Sindhu Vee; Paul Nurse; Rowan Pelling	The concept of hygge (Vee); The Large Hadron Collider (Nurse); A saucy limerick (Pelling)
5	5 February 2018	Ella Al-Shamahi; Dillie Keane; Richard Curtis	The perfect cave (Al-Shamahi); Her own homemade, slow-made chutney (Keane); The Australian word googies, meaning "eggs" (Curtis)
6	12 February 2018	Robert Twigger; Suzanne Williams; Jack Carroll	The attentionometer (Twigger); The bus seat that Rosa Parks refused to give up (Williams); Football Manager (Carroll)

=== Series 13 ===
Episode	Air date	Advisory committee	Exhibits donated
1	1 October 2018	Benjamin Zephaniah; Kat Arney; Lucy Beaumont	Tai chi (Zephaniah); A multi-coloured corn on the cob studied by Barbara McClintock (Arney); The smallest window in the world (Beaumont)
2	8 October 2018	Dolly Alderton; Athena Kugblenu; Professor Nigel Shadbolt	The world's worst wedding list (Alderton); A tin of corned beef (Kugblenu); Deep Blue (Shadbolt)
3	15 October 2018	Karen Dunbar; Professor John Wood; Shaun Keaveny	Side B, track 14 on disk 8 of a Pioneer LaserDisc karaoke machine (I Will Survive by Gloria Gaynor) (Dunbar); A single atom of iron and an X-ray free-electron laser (Wood); An old-fashioned tube of toothpaste (Keaveny)
4	22 October 2018	Steve Mould; Lucy Mangan; Graeme Le Saux	Tomy the Talking Tutor (Mould); An amusement arcade penny pusher machine (Mangan); A 1980s Sony Walkman (Le Saux)
5	29 October 2018	Daisy Goodwin; Lord Butler of Brockwell; Nina Conti	Prince Albert (Goodwin); 30 Russian MiG jet fighters found buried in the sand (Butler); A set of false teeth (Conti)
6	5 November 2018	Andrea Wulf; Vikram Jayanti; Bridget Christie	A Labelling Machine (Wulf); A mirror showing unfinished masterpieces (Jayanti); A vial of her own tears (Christie)

=== Annual Stock Take (2018 Christmas Special) ===
Air date	Advisory committee	Exhibits donated
25 December 2018	Lee Mack; Sally Philips; Jo Brand; Jimmy Carr	Boredom (Mack); Things that are so mediocre they normally they wouldn't be remembered (Philips); The smell of an estate agent (Brand); Laughter (Carr)

=== Series 14 ===
Episode	Air date	Advisory committee	Exhibits donated
1	30 September 2019	Linda Agran; Shini Somara; Jessica Fostekew	Test cricket (Agran); A slotted screw (Somara); A sign saying "Live, Love, Laugh" (Fostekew)
2	7 October 2019	James Wong; Sarah Kendall; Sir Chris Evans	A terrarium (Wong); A ship in a bottle (Kendall); A cabbage (Evans)
3	14 October 2019	Bobby Acharya; Fern Riddell; Ahir Shah	The Extra Dimension Observatory (Acharya); The Fruits of Philosophy published by Annie Besant (Riddell); A tin of tobacco (Shah)
4	21 October 2019	Jen Brister; Jason Hazeley; Edward Brooke-Hitching	A microphone (Brister); Maurice Ravel's royalties (Hazeley); A land grant for 60 acres of land in the Poyais (Brooke-Hitching)
5	28 October 2019	Celia Imrie; Lindsey Fitzharris; Andrew Maxwell	A half-burnt candle (Imrie); A cemetery gun (Fitzharris); A scale model old-school gypsy caravan (Maxwell)
6	4 November 2019	Philippa Perry; Carlo Ratti; Doug Allan	A swarm of fruit flies (Perry); A bionic arm (Ratti); The feeling you get when a wild animal trusts you (Allan)

=== 2019 Christmas Special ===
Air date	Advisory committee	Exhibits donated
23 December 2019	J. K. Rowling; Glyn Johns; Shazia Mirza	Inspiration (Rowling); A 3M M23 8 Track tape machine featuring a recording of Something by George Harrison. (Johns); A pair of real eyebrows. (Mirza)

=== Series 15 ===
Episode	Air date	Advisory committee	Exhibits donated
1	7 September 2020	Georgia Lewis Anderson (broadcaster and tech expert)	A mobile phone inside a crystal ball
1	7 September 2020	James Prichard (great-grandson of Agatha Christie)	Agatha Christie's 900ml mug inscribed "Don't Be Greedy", from which she drank cream
1	7 September 2020	Danny Wallace	A giant balloon for transportation
2	14 September 2020	Helen Fielding	The African plant Welwitschia mirabilis
2	14 September 2020	Ainsley Harriott	The Victoria Falls
2	14 September 2020	Suzi Ruffell	A Dutch upright bicycle
3	21 September 2020	Roopa Farooki	A virtual patient
3	21 September 2020	Eddie Izzard	The centre of the universe
3	21 September 2020	Miranda Lowe	A moon jellyfish
4	28 September 2020	Ian Hislop	All the printed material in the world
4	28 September 2020	Josh Widdicombe	Bowerman's Nose
4	28 September 2020	Eugenia Cheng	An equals sign
5	5 October 2020	Jo Frost	A bottle of Mount Gay Rum
5	5 October 2020	Ken Cheng	The Starship Enterprise
5	5 October 2020	Theo Fennell	The perfect after dinner singsong
6	12 October 2020	Hannah Gadsby	A tardigrade
6	12 October 2020	Sarah Beynon	A wildflower meadow
6	12 October 2020	Ade Adepitan	A headtorch

=== Series 16 ===
Episode	Air date	Advisory committee	Exhibits donated
1	18 October 2021	Jamie MacDonald	A Blue Badge
1	18 October 2021	Jennifer Higgie	A Self Portrait of Catharina van Hemessen
1	18 October 2021	Francis Hamel	Hieronymus Bosch's painting The Garden of Earthly Delights
2	25 October 2021	Evelyn Mok	Dragon Gate in Sweden
2	25 October 2021	Alun Withey	A mechanical beard
2	25 October 2021	Allan Scott	The Biggles books
3	1 November 2021	Jon Culshaw	The view from the surface of an alien planet
3	1 November 2021	Rosie Jones	The missing piece of the jigsaw
3	1 November 2021	Elisabeth Robinson	The high seas.
4	8 November 2021	Mary Roach	NASA's faecal simulant
4	8 November 2021	Griff Rhys Jones	The River Lea.
4	8 November 2021	Lemn Sissay	A button which when pressed tells you your talent.
5	15 November 2021	Catherine Bohart	A perfect soft-boiled egg
5	15 November 2021	Elizabeth Day	A red apple and a discarded hair extension, referencing The Real Housewives of New York
5	15 November 2021	Bruce Dickinson	A bible with a history
6	22 November 2021	Daliso Chaponda	A church of laughter
6	22 November 2021	Sabrina Cohen-Hatton	A pack of Xoloitzcuintle dogs
6	22 November 2021	Kevin Fong	The sunrise after a night shift

=== Series 17 ===
Episode	Air date	Advisory committee	Exhibits donated
1	20 February 2023	Bill Liao	Drosophila melanogaster
1	20 February 2023	Miriam Margolyes	Charles Dickens and all his works
1	20 February 2023	Chris McCausland	A Vinyl record
2	27 February 2023	Rosie Holt	The unwritten second half of Coleridge's Kubla Khan
2	27 February 2023	Olivia Potts	A jar of marmalade
2	27 February 2023	Carlo Rovelli	A white hole
3	6 March 2023	Polly Morgan	A hognose snake in a tupperware box
3	6 March 2023	Randall Munroe	10^{39} litres of soup
3	6 March 2023	Steve Nallon	His own larynx, posthumously
4	13 March 2023	Alasdair Beckett-King	The Red Book of Appin
4	13 March 2023	Sarah Storey	A map of the world
4	13 March 2023	Hannah Rose Thomas	The idea of getting lost
5	20 March 2023	Isabel Hardman	A bee orchid, Ophrys apifera
5	20 March 2023	Alfie Moore	A Chis (covert human intelligence source)
5	20 March 2023	Jess Wade	A Raman spectrometer
6	27 March 2023	Sikisa Bostwick-Barnes	A Game Boy Color
6	27 March 2023	Bridget Nicholls	A termite mound
6	27 March 2023	Levison Wood	A megalodon tooth

== Reception ==
Initial reaction to the series was mixed. Phil Daoust in The Guardian described the show as being "unusual" and "eclectic". Chris Campling, who wrote a preview of the first episode, highlighted it in his "Radio Choice" column for The Times. Gillian Reynolds highlighted the programme as one of her radio choices in the Daily Telegraph. Rosanna Chianta in Scotland on Sunday compared the show positively to QI, also created by Lloyd, while Frances Lass from the Radio Times said it was better, claiming it was, "QI with even more jokes. Made me bark with laughter", that, "Lord Reith would be so proud" and the programme was, "Pornography for the brain!"

Miranda Sawyer of The Observer criticised the show, saying that, "it's no QI, because the joy of that programme rests almost entirely in the host, Stephen Fry, and his subversion of the prissy, clever character we're familiar with (in QI, Fry is clever, but relaxed). The Museum of Curiosity is presented partly by Bill Bailey and mostly by John Lloyd, producer of QI (are you getting a theme?). Lloyd may well be a nice chap, but we haven't a clue who he is, and, on the evidence of this, he isn't a big or witty enough character for us to feel desperate to get to know him."

Nicholas Lezard in The Independent on Sunday was lukewarm about the show, saying that the combination of comedian and scientist guests "more or less worked", but he felt the show may not have been greenlit without Lloyd and Bailey's involvement.

Kate Chisholm in The Spectator found the show a welcome change from the "smutty jokes and banal innuendo" usually associated with the timeslot, and compared the series to Paul Merton's Room 101, "but without the ego".

Elisabeth Mahoney in The Guardian was critical of the second series. While praising the discussion between the guests as, "funny and flowing, and quite endearingly quirky", she found that the programme "fizzled away when it reached what ought to have been its crux: the donation of kooky items to the imaginary museum. Instead, we had a reminder of what they were, and then a sudden ending that was both limp and abrupt."

After appearing on the show in series 6, Richard Herring wrote on his blog: "What a delightful and fascinating programme this is (and one that I think might benefit from an extended podcast release – two hours of material is recorded for the 27-minute show and it's pretty much all gold!). At times I was so enjoying listening to the others talking that I almost forgot that I was meant to be taking part. It was a wide-ranging discussion taking in ants on stilts, pianists with crippling, mechanical little fingers, the changing meridian and okapi sex (can you guess what I contributed?). The show has a dedicated team of nerds behind it who have dug out amazing facts and I love the way it has a panel comprising comedians, scientists and experts and attempts to link each contribution to similar areas of the different disciplines. While most TV panel shows (including to some extent even QI) gravitate to putting in the same well-known comedy faces, you get a lot more interesting stuff by mixing it up a bit. The zoologist, Dr Christofer Clemente, came up with the funniest lines of the show. But would they book him on Mock The Week? It's intelligent and stimulating programming that is increasingly being edged out of TV and even radio, leaving a gaping open goal for independent internet productions to score in. I discussed this with one of the razor-minded team after the show. The TV companies insist on getting big names into all shows, which takes up all the budget and seems to ignore the fact that the pool of possible contributors gets smaller and more boring. But glad that a few shows designed to expand the mind rather than crush the spirit still exist."

On 13 September 2016, The Museum of Curiosity won the Rose d'Or in the radio talk show category.
