= Longmen =

Longmen (simplified Chinese: 龙门; traditional Chinese: 龍門; pinyin: Lóngmén; lit. 'dragon gate') may refer to:

- Longmen (mythology), the Dragon Gate in Chinese mythology that turns carp into dragons
- Longmen Grottoes, collection of Buddhist cave art in Luoyang
- Longmen Mountains, mountain range in Sichuan
- Dragon Gate Taoism, also known as the Longmen lineage
- Longmen County, Guangdong

== Township-level administrative divisions in China ==
Longmen Town (Chinese: 龙门镇):

- Longmen, Anxi County, Fujian
- Longmen, Chongqing, in Liangping County
- Longmen, Guangdong, in Leizhou
- Longmen, Hainan, in Ding'an County
- Longmen, Henan, in Luolong District, Luoyang
- Longmen, Pingjiang (龙门镇), a town in Pingjiang County, Hunan province.
- Longmen, Jiangxi, in Yongxin County
- Longmen, Lintao County, Gansu
- Longmen, Mianyang, in Fucheng District, Mianyang, Sichuan
- Longmen, Nanchong, in Gaoping District, Nanchong, Sichuan
- Longmen, Pubei County, in Pubei County, Guangxi
- Longmen, Shaanxi, in Hancheng
- Longmen, Zhejiang, in Fuyang District, Hangzhou, Zhejiang

Longmen Township (Chinese: 龙门乡):

- Longmen Township, Anhui, in Huangshan District, Huangshan City
- Longmen Township, Emeishan, Sichuan
- Longmen Township, Gansu, in Lingtai County
- Longmen Township, Guangxi, in Daxin County
- Longmen Township, Hebei, in Laishui County
- Longmen Township, Lezhi County, Sichuan
- Longmen Township, Meigu County, Sichuan
- Longmen Township, Qinghai, in Tian'e County
- Longmen Township, Ya'an, in Lushan County, Sichuan
- Longmen Township, Yunnan, in Yongping County

Longmen Subdistrict (Chinese: 龙门街道):

- Longmen Subdistrict, Longjing, Jilin
- Longmen Subdistrict, Longyan, in Xinluo District, Longyan, Fujian
- Longmen Subdistrict, Pingyuan County, Shandong

== See also ==
- Dragon Gate (disambiguation)
