= Mecca Gate =

Landmark at the Jeddah–Makkah Highway

- بوابة مكة; Bawwābāt Makka
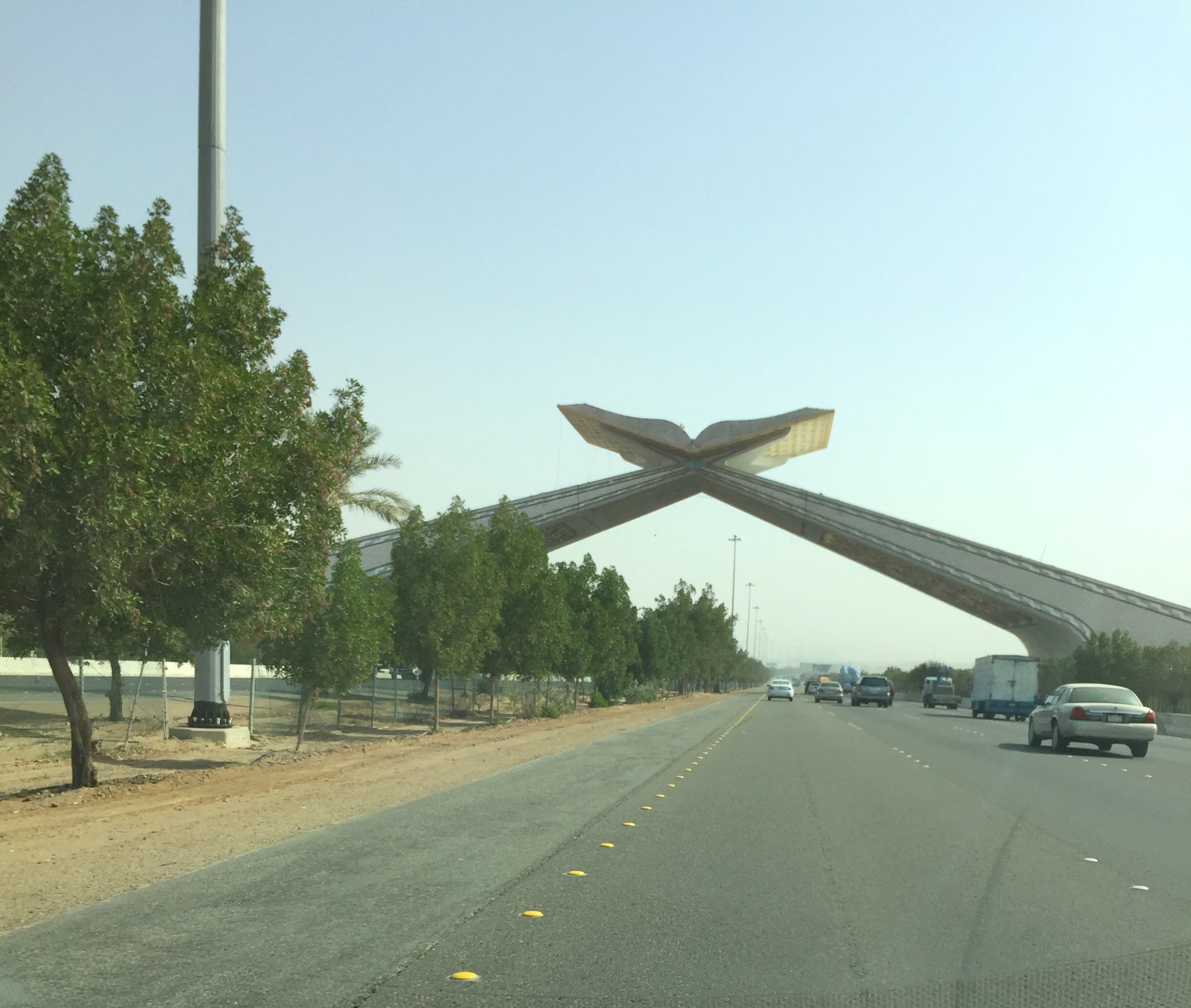
- Gate (2015)
- Interactive map of Mecca Gate
- Location: Jeddah–Makkah Highway; Mecca, Mecca Region, Saudi Arabia
- Coordinates: 21°21′44.5″N 39°40′0.2″E
- Designer: Dia Aziz Dia (designer); Samir Elabd (architect)
- Type: road arch gateway
- Material: reinforced concrete
- Length: 135–152 m (443–499 ft)
- Width: 26–48 m (85–157 ft)
- Height: premises: 3 m (10 ft) wings: 3–23 m (10–75 ft) book: 23–31 m (75–102 ft)
- Beginning date: 1979; 47 years ago
- Dedicated to: Qur'an, Muhammad
- Bawabat Makkah Co. is wholly owned by Al-Balad al-Ameen Company.

The Gate of Mecca, Mecca Gate or Makkah Gate (Arabic: بوابة مكة Bawwābāt Makka), also known as Qur'an Gate (Arabic: بوابة القرآن Bawwābāt al-Qurʾān), is an arch gateway monumental on the Makkah al-Mukkarramah road of the Jeddah–Makkah Highway. It is the entrance to Mecca, the birthplace of the Islamic prophet Muhammad and signifies the boundary of the haram area of the city of Mecca, where non-Muslims are prohibited to enter.

== History ==
The Gate was built in 1979. Design was done by Dia Aziz Dia, and architect was Samir Elabd.

Mecca Mayor, Osama bin Fadl al-Bar, acts as Bawabat Makkah Co. Board of Directors Chairman. Complex Bawabat Makkah consists of 5 types of currently developing projects: Governmental Projects, Special Development Projects, Investment Projects, Non-profit Projects, and Funding Projects.

== Description ==
The gateway is built as an arch over the road, and consists of three main parts:

- two premises each 30 m × 48 m (98 ft × 157 ft) wide and about 3 m (10 ft) tall, and located at sides of the road; act as support blocks for wings (make arch)
- two wings each about 80 m (262 ft) long, 48–18 m (157–59 ft) wide and 20 m (66 ft) tall, and stretching-up from premises to merge about 23 m (75 ft) above the road; act as support foundation for book (its stand)
- open book with two pages about 16.5 m (54 ft) long and 26 m (85 ft) wide each, and spanning 23–31 m (75–102 ft) above the road; acts as main symbol for arch

The main part is structure of Islam's Holy Book – Qur'an, sitting on a rehal (book stand).

Reinforced concrete was used as primary building material; plastic, glass, wood and other materials are also present (e.g. Islamic luminous mosaics/vitrails beneath arches, arched entrances into premises etc.). Whole structure is decorated with various patterns and can get illuminated at night in many different ways.

Under structure there are palm trees planted in line along divide-island, as well as other lower trees and ornamental bushes growing on island around palms and at free land space beside four-laned parkway (divided highway). On its sides there is fine-cut boxwood inside tidy gardens, with shaped and perimeter fences, small parking lots and other auxiliary facilities extending into a big complex.

== See also ==
- Dragon Gate
- Gateway Arch
- Jamaraat Bridge
- Masjid-u-Shajarah
- Holiest sites in Islam
- Memorial gates and arches
