= Whelton =

Whelton is a surname. Notable people with the surname include:

- Bill Whelton (born 1959), American ice hockey player
- Daniel A. Whelton (1872–1953), American politician
- James Whelton, Irish computer programmer
- Joe Whelton (born 1956), American basketball coach
- Paul Whelton, American physician
