= Jos Hackforth-Jones =

Academic administrator and art historian

Jos Hackforth-Jones is an academic administrator, art historian, author, curator, and lecturer. She is the CEO and Director of Sotheby's Institute of Art - London She holds an MA from Courtauld Institute of Art, University of London and a BA from the University of Sydney.
