= Isabel Behncke =

Chilean primatologist

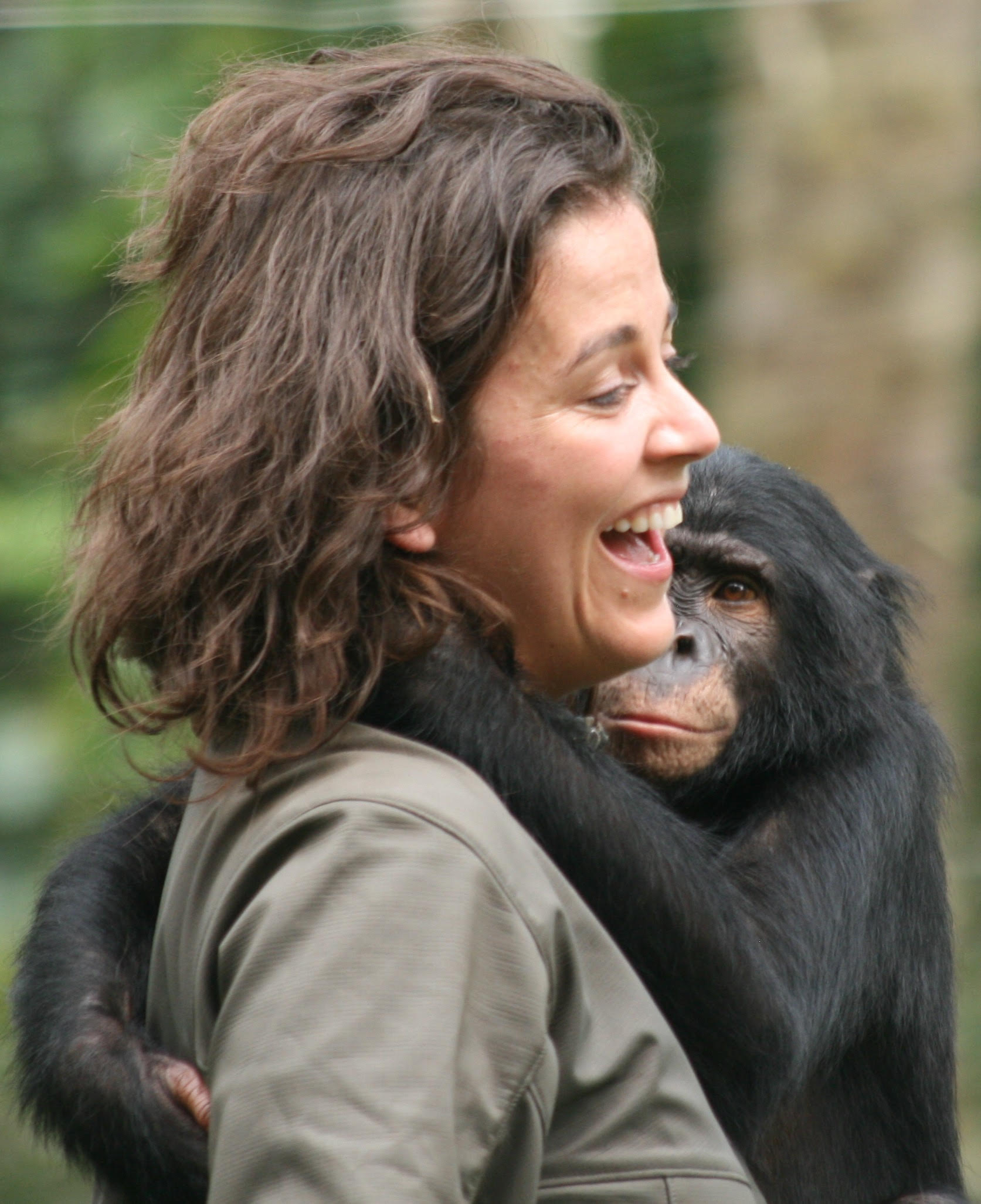
- Born: Santiago de Chile, Chile.
- Education: University College London; University of Cambridge (BA); University of Oxford (PhD)
- Known for: Study and conservation of the bonobos
- Scientific career
- Fields: Primatology
- Workplaces: University of Oxford; Universidad del Desarrollo

Isabel Behncke Izquierdo is a field ethologist who studies animal behaviour to understand other animals. Originally from Chile, she is a primatologist, a pioneer adventurer-scientist and the first South American in following great apes in the wild. Behncke is currently director of the Centro de Estudios Públicos (CEP), and advisor to the Chilean government, working on long-term strategies in science, technology, innovation and knowledge as a member of the National Council of Science, Technology, Knowledge and Innovation for Development (CTCI), of the Ministry of Science, Technology, Knowledge and Innovation of Chile She is a board member of the PERC research institute, which is dedicated to promoting environmental conservation, Gruter Institute research fellow, researcher at the Social Complexity Research Center, Faculty of Government, Universidad del Desarrollo, and Member of the conservation area team at Estancia Cerro Guido in Chilean Patagonia.

== Education ==
Behncke has a BSc in Zoology and an MSc in Wildlife Conservation from University College London, an MPhil in Human Evolution from Cambridge and a DPhil in Evolutionary Anthropology from Oxford.

== Career ==
She walked more than 3,000 km following wild bonobos (Pan paniscus) in the Congo jungle. Her PhD for Oxford University was the first comprehensive study of play behaviour in wild bonobos known to science.

Behncke applies an evolutionary lens to derive insights into human behaviour and the modern challenges that humanity and the planet face. Her focus in studying play in non-human primates has been to shed light on the role of play in our own development, as humans are one of the few species that play during adulthood. For Behncke, play is at the root of creativity, social bonding and healthy development.

As of 2019 she is an Academic Collaborator of the Research Centre in Social Complexity (CICS) in Universidad del Desarrollo, Santiago, Chile; a Fellow of the Bay Area-based Gruter Institute for Interdisciplinary Research on Human Behavior & Institutions; and Visiting Researcher at Robin Dunbar's Social Neuroscience Evolutionary Research Group (SNRG) at University of Oxford.

In her profile for TED, Behncke summarises her research as:

What makes us human? What does it really mean to be a social animal? And how can these Q's help humans live win-win with the rest of nature? Knowing our past help us situate our present - & co-create our future. Looking at other animals help us understand ourselves - & our place in the web of life.

=== Conservation of Temperate Rainforests ===
As Director of Huilo-Huilo Foundation, she was part of the emerging private conservation movement of the early 2000s. At 60,000 square km, Huilo-Huilo is a private for profit natural reserve and ecotourism project in southern Chile. For this work, she lived in the field (years 2001-2004), near the shores of Northern Patagonia's Pirihueico Lake with her parrot Tuk. With the aim of enhancing ecosystem resilience Behncke was part of a group of people who were pioneering social and ecosystem integration through the creation of biodiversity corridors and habitat conservation. She worked with organizations such as Senda Darwin and Parques para Chile, and international wilderness conservation Planet Heritage Foundation.

=== Wild bonobo research ===
Bonobos, together with chimpanzees, are our living closest relatives. Yet they are the least known of apes. They are highly endangered and live only south of the river Congo in the tropical jungles of DRC. Bonobos are unusual in that they are highly sexual, peaceful, and have a matriarchy where non-related females bond strongly with each other. They, like humans, play throughout their lives. It appears that the regular experience of social fun is core to developing and maintaining bonobo cohesive societies. Behncke has highlighted the importance of the role of females in animal societies not just in bonobos but also in other species such as elephants Behncke worked at Wamba, Luo Reserve, the world's longest running bonobo research site, run by Japanese scientists of Kyoto University. Wamba has survived a number of political upheavals in the region. Chronic bloodshed in Congo meant that at the time of her study Behncke was the first western person in more than 20 years to do bonobo research at Wamba.

=== Burning Man and ethology in festivals ===
Behncke highlights how social gatherings are a natural and fundamental part of our lives as highly social animals. Doing human ethology at festivals like Burning Man in the desert or Carnival in Brazil, she has studied how the function of parties isn't for excessive indulgence; rather, parties enable social and economic interaction and integrate and build our social complexity

=== Applied human sciences ===
Behncke has developed a style of knowledge integration that she applies to current human issues. She uses evolutionary, behavioural and ecological sciences to derive principles relevant to the capacity to adapt to change both of individuals and organisations. She is often an invited guest to teach and participate in think-tanks issues that require trans-disciplinary approaches, such as the future of cities as social habitats, depression and mental health, behavioural economics and engagement or how to design rituals for organizational change

== Other activities ==
Behncke studies play as an ethologist and as a direct participant to gain insights on creativity, collaboration, and well-being. In NYC she took up Improv and did a TED Residency talk on the parallels of the creative process of nature and those arising by the rules of improv, titled 'Does nature have a sense of humour?' Behncke has been avid traveller all her life, and enjoys music, wilderness, large dogs, horses, mountains, and connecting people and ideas.

=== Patagonia expeditions and history of exploration ===
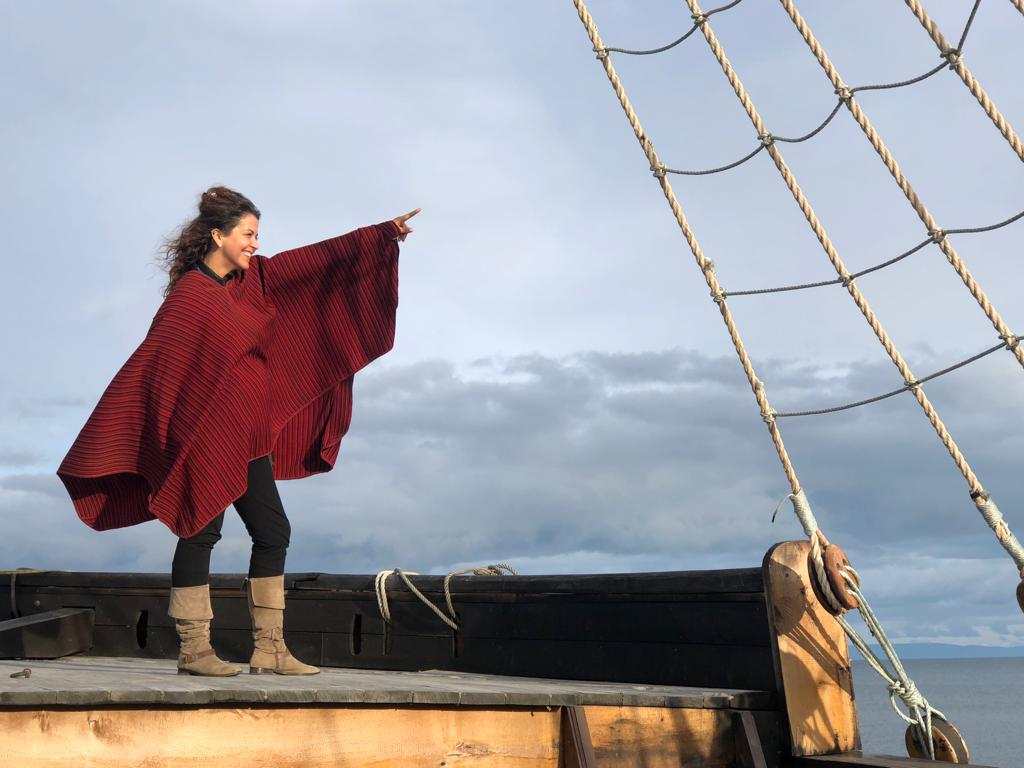
Expeditions to Patagonia

Behncke often participates and co-leads expeditions to Patagonia, highlighting its wild nature as well as its role in the history of exploration. In collaboration with Congreso Futuro in January 2017 she took a group of scientists including Richard Dawkins on board the world's only 1:1 replica of HMS Beagle, the ship that took Captain FitzRoy and Charles Darwin around the world, and from whose journey the Origin of Species was eventually born.

== Public speaking ==
In 2011 she was a TED Fellow and gave a talk "Evolution's gift of play, from bonobo apes to humans".

TED main event, 2017, Español session 'Why we party?', on the natural history of human festivals.

TEDx BRC 2014 and TEDx BRC 2016 (together with Esther Perel).

Behncke has delivered keynote plenaries at stages as diverse as the Gruter Institute, SUMMIT LA, and Aspen Circles. Other speaking invitations include the United Nations General Assembly NYC, Google Zeitgeist, House of Lords London, SXSW, WIRED, G20, as well as academic meetings such as Human Evolution and Behaviour Society (HBES) and Human Ethology (ISHE).

== Radio, film, newspapers & TV ==
=== Radio ===
- In October 2013 she appeared on BBC Radio 4's The Museum of Curiosity. Her hypothetical donation to this fictional museum was "a laughing tree", a tree in which Bonobos congregated and laughed such that the tree itself seemed to laugh.

=== Podcast ===
- The Tim Ferris Show. Primatologist Isabel Behncke on Play, Sexual Selection, and Lessons from Following Bonobos for 3,000 Kilometers in the Jungles of Congo (#598). June 1, 2022.
- NPR TED Hour ('Play, social health and Burning Man'). Podcasts: Mating Grounds with Geoffrey Miller and Tuker Max

=== Documentaries ===
- ´Animals in Love' (BBC), Ape Man (National Geographic), ´Animals At Play´ (BBC, 2019) and Independent film ´Bounce: How the ball taught the world to play´.

=== Newspapers ===
- In 2020, she was interviewed by BBC News to find out her opinion and observation of human behavior in the pandemic caused by Covid-19. "What I'm seeing with humans in confinement isn't too dissimilar to caged parrots I've seen plucking their feathers." This interview was listed by BBC Mundo as one of the 12 best interviews it published during 2020.

== Prizes and awards ==
- ENEL Premio Energía Mujer (2018) (National recognition for women for commitment to social and cultural developments)
- Chilenos Sin Frontera (2017) (Initiative that recognizes 30 Chilean talents who are innovating in various disciplines)

- 10 Chileans who are changing the world (2017) (1-hr homage documentary produced by the Chilean public television broadcaster TVN)
- 100 Women Leaders by El Mercurio newspaper (2012) (National recognition for a group of women for their contributions in science, innovation and academic trajectory)
- 100 Young Leaders by El Mercurio newspaper (2010) (National recognition for a group of young promising talents)

Behncke's has also been featured in publications highlighting female achievement and women in science.

== Other honors ==
- TED Fellowship (2011)
- TED Residency, Inaugural class Spring 2016, at TED HQ in Soho, NYC.

== Selected publications ==
- Behncke, Isabel (January 2015). "Play in the Peter Pan ape". Current Biology. 25 (1): R24–R27. doi:10.1016/j.cub.2014.11.020. PMID 25562296.
- Sakamaki, Tetsuya; Behncke, Isabel; Laporte, Marion; Mulavwa, Mbangi; Ryu, Heungjin; Takemoto, Hiroyuki; Tokuyama, Nahoko; Yamamoto, Shinya; Furuichi, Takeshi (2015). "Intergroup Transfer of Females and Social Relationships Between Immigrants and Residents in Bonobo (Pan paniscus) Societies". Dispersing Primate Females. Primatology Monographs. pp. 127–164. doi:10.1007/978-4-431-55480-6_6. ISBN 978-4-431-55479-0.
- David-Barrett, Tamas; Rotkirch, Anna; Carney, James; Behncke Izquierdo, Isabel; Krems, Jaimie A.; Townley, Dylan; McDaniell, Elinor; Byrne-Smith, Anna; Dunbar, Robin I. M.; Jiang, Luo-Luo (16 March 2015). "Women Favour Dyadic Relationships, but Men Prefer Clubs: Cross-Cultural Evidence from Social Networking". PLOS ONE. 10 (3) e0118329. Bibcode:2015PLoSO..1018329D. doi:10.1371/journal.pone.0118329. PMC 4361571. PMID 25775258.
- Dávid-Barrett, Tamas; Rotkirch, Anna; Carney, James; Izquierdo, Isabel Behncke (2015). "Mating strategies in Mozart's Figaro". Human Ethology Bulletin. 30 (1): 83–98.
- Sullivan, Richard; Behncke, Isabel; Purushotham, Arnie (16 July 2010). "Why do we love medicines so much?". EMBO Reports. 11 (8): 572–578. doi:10.1038/embor.2010.108. PMC 2920438. PMID 20634806.
- Behncke, I; Hooley, J.L; Hooley, G.J. (2006). "Lord of the Thesis: Lessons from Middle Earth for Research Students". Academia.
- Behncke, I.; Armesto, J. (2004). "Conservation Innovation in South-Central Chile". The Report on Conservation Innovation. Harvard Forest, Harvard University: 12–20.
- Armesto, Juan; Behncke, Isabel (2004). "Innovación en conservación en Chile" [Innovation in conservation in Chile]. Revista Ambiente y Desarrollo (in Spanish). 20 (2): 5–11.
- Cabello, Gertrudis; Vilaxa, Arnaldo; Spotorno, Angel E.; Valladares, John; Pickard, Mark; Sinha, Arun; McArthur, John; Behncke, Isabel; Duerr, Annette; Sullivan, Richard; Gomperts, Bastien D. (April 2003). "Evolutionary adaptation of a mammalian species to an environment severely depleted of iodide". Pflügers Archiv: European Journal of Physiology. 446 (1): 42–45. doi:10.1007/s00424-002-0972-0. PMID 12690461. S2CID 20664097.
