= Miranda Lowe =

British museum curator

Miranda Lowe CBE FLS FRSB
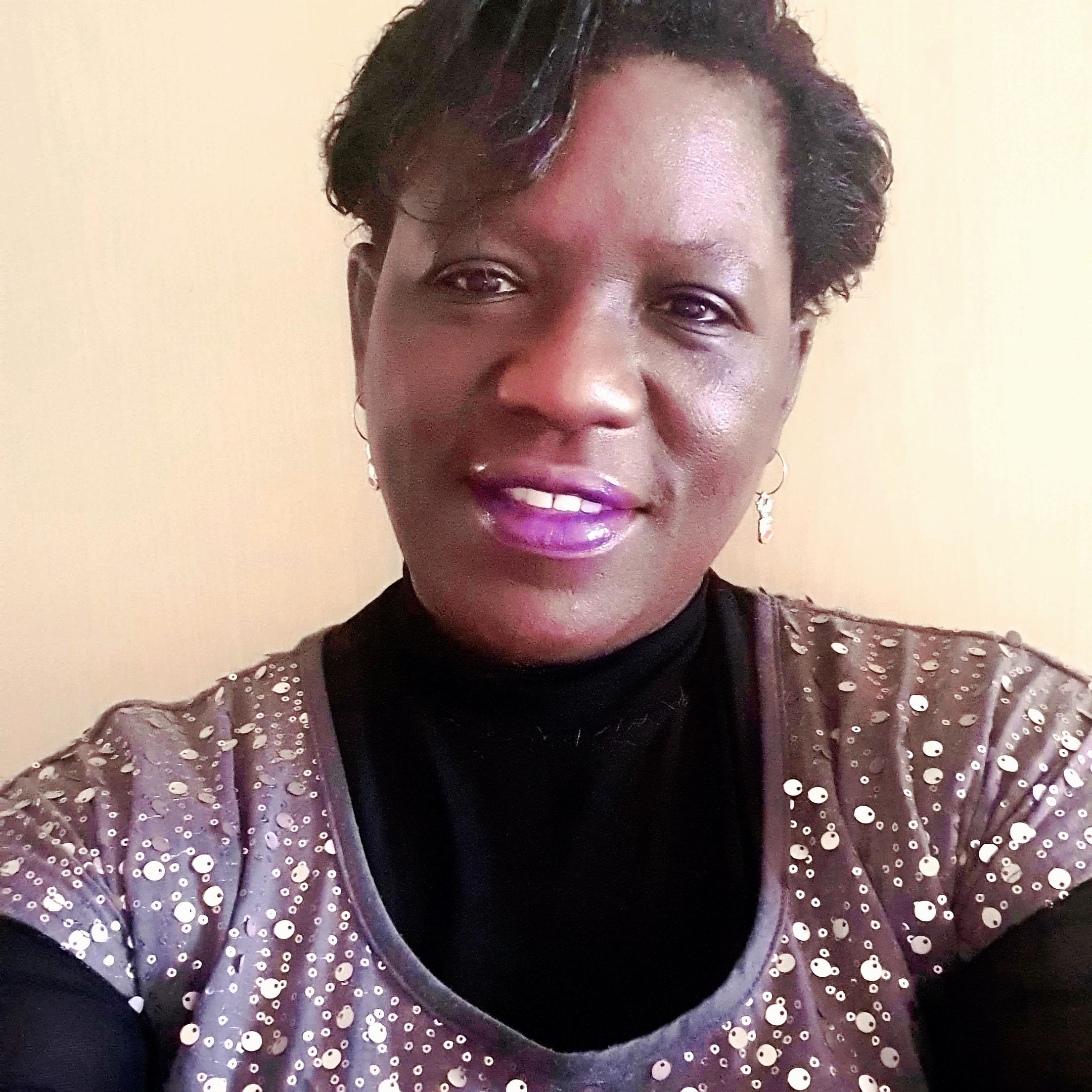
- Occupations: Natural historian Curator

Academic work
- Discipline: Natural history
- Institutions: Natural History Museum

Miranda Constance Lowe CBE FLS FRSB is a British museum curator. She is principal curator of crustacea at the Natural History Museum, London and a founder member of Museum Detox.

== Career ==
She has particular expertise in peracarida and coral taxonomy, and she manages the museum's collections in crustacea and cnidaria. She has published work on the museum's collection of 182 glass sea creatures made by Leopold and Rudolf Blaschka.

She is a committee member of NatSCA, the Natural Sciences Collections Association.

In 2018 Lowe and Subhadra Das of the Grant Museum of Zoology and Comparative Anatomy co-authored "Nature Read in Black and White: decolonial approaches to interpreting natural history collections", described by the Linnean Society's head of collections as "eye-opening". They went on to be founding members of Museum Detox, an organisation bringing together BAME museum workers in the UK.

In July 2020 Lowe was appointed as a Trustee of York Museums Trust.

In September 2020 she appeared on BBC Radio 4's The Museum of Curiosity, when her hypothetical donation to this imaginary museum was a moon jellyfish.

In December 2020 she explained about bias in the fossil record within the Royal Institution Christmas Lecture about Planet Earth given by Christopher Jackson. Four months later she was elected chair of the Board of Trustees overseeing the United Kingdom arts diversity charity Culture&.

== Selected publications ==
- Miller, C. Giles; Lowe, Miranda (February 2008). "The Natural History Museum Blaschka collections". Historical Biology. 20 (1): 51–62. doi:10.1080/08912960701677531. S2CID 85173379.
- Lowe, Miranda; Boulter, Carolyn J. (2015). "Darwin's Barnacles: Learning from collections". In Boulter, Carolyn J.; Reiss, Michael J.; Sanders, Dawn L. (eds.). Darwin-Inspired Learning. Springer. pp. 273–284. ISBN 978-94-6209-833-6.
- Sivell, Duncan; Beale, Joe; Reilly, Nicky; Lowe, Miranda; et al. (November 2019). "The wildlife garden at the Natural History Museum: Developments of the flora and fauna. Update 2018-2019 - Twenty-four years of species recording". The London Naturalist. 98: 248–258.
- Syperek, Pandora; Wade, Sarah; Lowe, Miranda; Sabin, Richard (27 May 2020). "Curating Ocean Ecology at the Natural History Museum: Miranda Lowe and Richard Sabin in conversation with Pandora Syperek and Sarah Wade". Science Museum Group Journal. 13 (13). doi:10.15180/201314.

== Honours and awards ==
In November 2020 she was included in the BBC Radio 4 Woman's Hour Power list 2020.

In 2021, Lowe and Subhadra Das were awarded the Society for the History of Natural History President's Award. The citation said that "their efforts have together sent a clarion call to museums and heritage organisations to acknowledge colonial histories and to take action."

Lowe was appointed Commander of the Order of the British Empire (CBE) in the 2022 Birthday Honours for services to science communication and diversity in natural history.
