= Bill Liao =

Australian entrepreneur (born 1967)

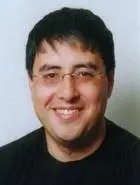
Bill Liao (born William Fu Wei Liao, 1967) is an Australian entrepreneur. He is a venture partner with SOSV and recognised as one of the Top 100 minority ethnic leaders in technology by the Financial Times.

== Career ==
Liao is a social networking pioneer, author and speaker. He is a regular attendee at the TED conferences and also the World Economic Forum New Champions conference. Mr. Liao also has worked in the commodities trading arena with several boutique Swiss investment funds. Since May 9, 2022 Bill Liao has been appointed Chairman of the Board of Directors of the SRF (SENS Research Foundation)

== Venture capital ==
Liao joined SOSV as their European Venture Partner specialising in Internet and social media in 2011. Most notably he has invested in Mark Little's Storyful venture, Silicon Republic as well as MavenHut. In 2014 he founded SOSV's biotech practice, RebelBio (formerly IndieBio), a VC-led investment programme for BioTech, HealthTech And Life Sciences. Liao is Managing Director of RebelBio, which is a world pioneer for life sciences accelerators.

Liao co-founded XING.com, a European early social network founded by Lars Hinrichs in Germany in 2003. He was the first external investor in the company, then called openBC.com. Later, Liao became a supervisory board member.

Previously, Liao was the Director of Operations (DOO) of telecommunications company Davnet, which achieved the fastest capital value growth in the history of the Australian Stock exchange. Davnet was acquired by Japanese telecommunications carrier Nippon Telegraph and Telephone Corporation (NTT) in 1996. Liao left Davnet after the acquisition.

Davnet was previously named Golden Hills Mining NL, a mining and exploration company of precious metals in Australia and was the source of a reverse merger in the creation of Davnet Limited effective January 13, 1999 to February 28, 2002 and subsequently became Davnet Telecommunications Pty Ltd .

In 2024, Liao joined Seed Healthcare, an early-stage venture fund focused on preventative care and early disease detection, as a member of its Advisory Board and Chair of its Investment Committee.

== Social entrepreneurship ==
Alongside James Whelton, Liao founded CoderDojo in Ireland in 2011, a not-for-profit organisation that teaches children how to code. A champion of teaching children to code CoderDojo has spread to many countries, even getting a royal seal approval to coding clubs by Prince Andrew.

He is Chair of Nominet UK's Social Tech Trust, a dedicated grant maker in socially motivated tech in the UK. Whilst acting as a trustee, Mr William Fu Wei Liao, for Nominet UK in 2013, CoderDojo (Hello World Foundation - now part of part of the Raspberry Pi Foundation) received the sum of £27,990 in grant support.

He is also a CoderDojo mentor and he has participated as an investor and volunteer in The Hunger Project in Uganda, New York and Mexico.

== Climate activism ==
In 2009, Liao founded WeForest.org, an organisation promoting reforestation as a way to combat global warming. WeForest.org continues, with a stated goal of planting two trillion trees by 2020 and is run from Belgium by its current CEO Marie-Noelle Keijzer.

He is a frequent blog poster on Medium on the subject of Climate Change (and other subjects including, 'Psychopaths and how to spot them').

He was an official part of the delegation of St Kitts and Nevis to the COP15 UN climate change summit in Copenhagen where he also promoted the science and concepts behind WeForest.org.

Liao was appointed as a special diplomatic envoy for St Kitts and Nevis for sustainable development and the environment. He has contributed to the St Kitts and Nevis recovery fund for the sugar cane industry there.

The award of this diplomatic status was given to Liao via support from Henley & Partners a firm where he sits on their advisory board, and act as the global leader in residence and citizenship by investment. Henley & Partners were subject to an investigative piece by the Guardian newspaper in 2021.

Mr Liao provided a written testimonial to Henley & Partners for the services they provide; 'Henley & Partners is a truly global firm of global citizens supporting global citizens with absolutely outstanding service and results'.

== Involvement in oil and minerals ==
In 2016 WeForest.org published a statement that confirmed Bill Liao sat on the board of a US based oil exploration company Starboard Resources (latterly known as Brushy Resources, Inc, then acquired by Lillis Energy, Inc. (OTC: LLEXQ)). An oil exploration and development company operating in the Permian Basin of West Texas and South Eastern New Mexico. Lillis Energy were acquired by Ameredev.

In a 2016 filing with the SEC its states that 'The Chairman of the Company's Board of Directors, Bill Liao, works for SOSventures'. Further, a group composed of SOSventures, Sean O’Sullivan Revocable Living Trust and Bradford R. Higgins constitute a group owning 4,863,720 or 39.34% of the Company's common stock shares. The CEO of SOSV Sean O'Sullivan is known for his environmental projects and is a frequent speaker on the subject, including a lecture on 'Reducing Oil Dependence' given in 2012 to the IIEA.

Liao was named in legal proceedings where he is referred to as an SOSv representative in a dispute with fellow shareholders.

In SEC filings in 2013 stated clearly that Bill Liao was Director and Chairman of Board of Directors of Starboard Resources. A fellow director of Starboard Resources was Bradford (Brad) Higgins, also a venture partner at SOSV and former CFO at the US Department of State.

== Start-up mentor and investor ==
Mr Liao is a frequent mentor and investor in technology start-up companies. A key subject he delivers advice on is 'the importance of listening'.

== Author ==
Mr Liao's publication issued in 2014, 'Forests. Reasons to be hopeful', is available to purchase on Amazon and currently has a single 5 star rating.

In November 2018, Liao was named to the Financial Times' list of the 'Top 100 minority ethnic leaders in technology.'

== Personal life ==
He is married with three children and lives in Cork, Ireland.

He appeared on BBC Radio 4's The Museum of Curiosity in February 2023. His hypothetical donation to this imaginary museum was Drosophila melanogaster.
