= Doris Vickers =

Austrian archaeoastronomer

Doris Vickers (born 1980) is an Austrian archaeoastronomer and content manager for the Unesco Portal to the Heritage of Astronomy.

She was a global co-ordinator of the Ancient Skies project, along with Ruediger Schulz. The project began in 2006 aiming to create a knowledge base of human cultures and their knowledge of astronomy, with the vision "One Planet – One Mankind – One Sky – One Knowledgebase", and as of July 2016 is "currently transferring the complete project to a new environment".

In February 2016 she appeared on BBC Radio 4's The Museum of Curiosity. Her hypothetical donation to this imaginary museum was a star clock.

== Publications ==
- Schultz, Rüdiger; Vickers, Doris (26 July 2011). "The 'Ancient Skies' project—human cultures and their skies". Proceedings of the International Astronomical Union. 7 (S278): 397–403. Bibcode:2011IAUS..278..397S. doi:10.1017/S1743921311012853.
