= The Bug Farm =

Research centre and insect restaurant

Coordinates: 51.8895°N 5.2358°W

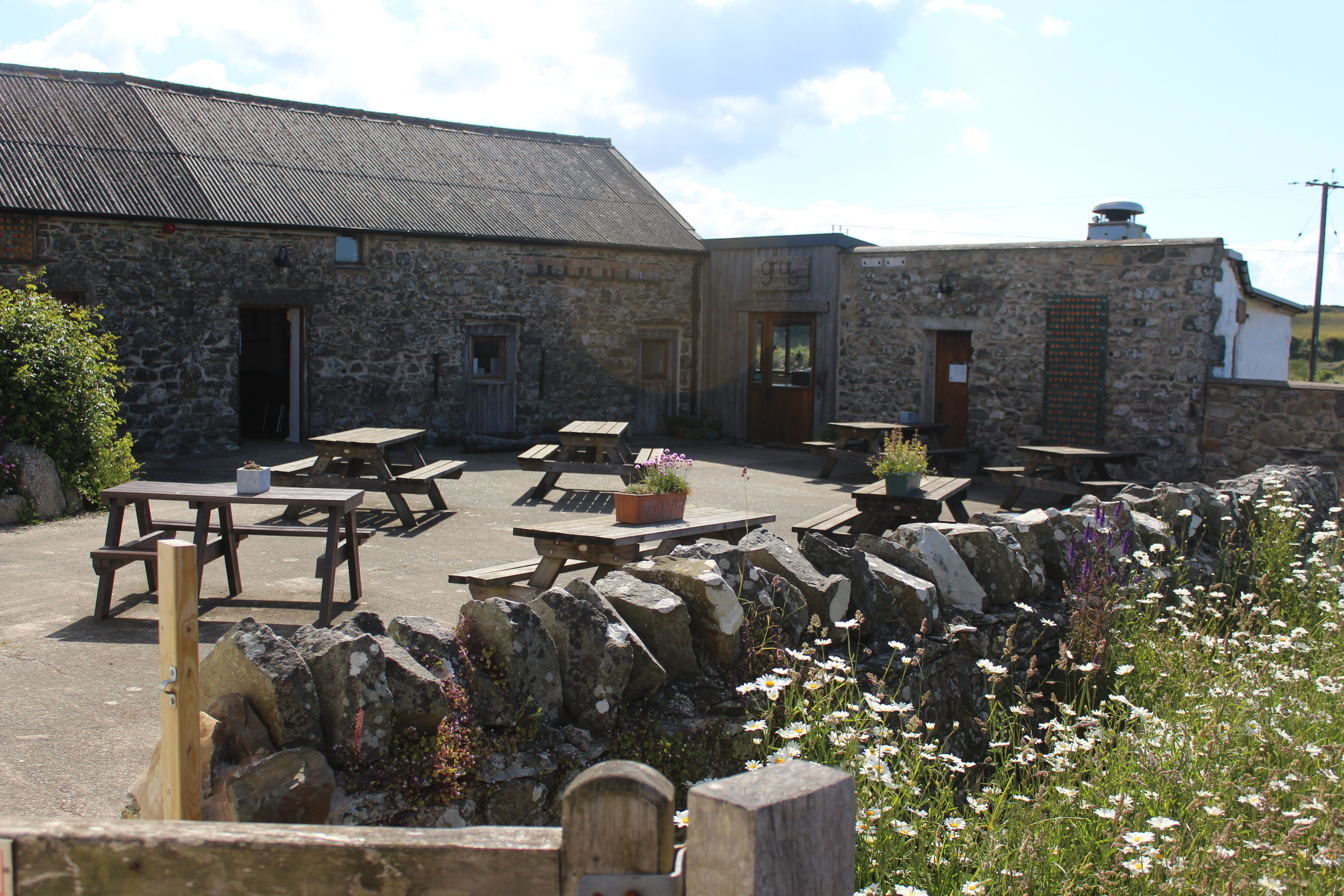
Outdoor seating in the cafe of the Bug Farm

The Bug Farm or Dr Beynon's Bug Farm is a multipurpose farm and research centre near St Davids, in Pembrokeshire, Wales, run by Dr Sarah Beynon, an entomologist and farmer on her former family farm.

The farm aims to look into nature recovery and sustainable farming practices, and in particular the use of bugs within agriculture including as a form of sustenance. The farm also has publicly accessible venues such as a museum, art gallery, garden, bug zoo, and the Grub Kitchen with chef Andy Holcroft which serves insect based dishes. These include recreations of popular dishes such as burgers as well as insects which remain in an identifiable state. Both Beynon and Holcroft featured in the 2017 BBC documentary "The Bug Grub Couple".

Insects for consumption are sourced from Canada and the Netherlands which have legal guidelines for insect farming practices which the United Kingdom lacks.

During 2025–26 the farm is running a National Lottery Heritage Fund Nature Networks Fund project to connect up wildlife habitats across the St Davids peninsula and reduce the impact of dog spot-ons and livestock wormers on local Pembrokeshire soils and waters.
