= CoderDojo =

Irish grassroots coding organisation

- Formation: 23 July 2011
- Founders: Bill Liao, James Whelton
- Founded at: Cork, Ireland
- Location: Ireland
- Website: coderdojo.com

CoderDojo is a global volunteer-led community of free programming workshops for young people. The movement began in 2011 as a grassroots organisation with each individual clubs acting independently, with one founding principle: One Rule, Be Cool. Supporters of CoderDojo believe it is part of the solution to address the global shortage of programmers by getting young people more involved with ICT learning. The movement has seen significant growth since its founding. The CoderDojo Foundation estimates 1,250 Dojos spread across 69 countries, with a growth rate of several new Dojos every week.

== History ==
Founded in July 2011 by James Whelton and Bill Liao, the first Dojo took place in NSC Cork, Ireland, on 23 July. James and Bill were self-taught programmers and wanted to create a space where young people could learn code in a social environment. In less than one year, the CoderDojo movement was spread across Ireland and other cities like London in England, and San Francisco in the United States.

In 2012, Dojocon began as a series of annual gatherings for the global CoderDojo community. In 2012, Coolest Projects began as an annual showcase of ninja projects. In 2013, the Hello World Foundation was established by James Whelton. In 2014, Hello World foundation is rebranded as CoderDojo Foundation, focused on supporting, scaling, and empowering the CoderDojo Community. In 2015, the first of a series of Megadojo events was held. In 2017, Coderdojo merged with Raspberry Pi foundation, which also runs a parallel program called Code Club. Since then, CoderDojo has officially become part of the Code Club Community. However, some Coderdojos are electing to continue operating independently as they always have done.

== Press Coverage and Academic Studies ==
The emergent CoderDojo received positive reviews from newspapers including BBC, CNN, The Guardian, The Irish Times and TechCrunch.

In 2023, Dr Abeer Alsheaibi of the School of Computer Science and Statistics published her phd thesis An Investigation of Teaching Approaches in a Non-formal Setting: An Exploratory Case Study of Irish CoderDojos

== CoderDojo Girls ==
Many CoderDojo volunteers focus on improving the extreme shortage of women in technology by using specific strategies to engage girls. Some Dojos run special CoderDojo Girls sessions to encourage young women to participate in computer science. There has been some success with attracting girls into Dojos through making female mentors visible to newcomers.

== See also ==
- Ghana Code Club
