= Sarah Beynon =

British entomologist, ecologist and presenter

- Education: University of Oxford (BSc, DPhil)
- Scientific career
- Workplaces: University of Oxford The Bug Farm

Sarah Beynon is an entomologist, ecologist and presenter in the UK. She is a senior research associate at the University of Oxford and is founder of The Bug Farm.

== Education and career ==
Beynon was educated at the University of Oxford, she did an undergraduate degree in Biology and a DPhil looking at the impacts of agricultural intensification on non-target invertebrates and ecosystem services at Jesus College, Oxford graduating in 2012; in 2014 she was appointed senior research associate at the University of Oxford.

Her research looks at the importance of dung beetles and she surveyed species in agricultural pastures on Ramsey Island. She showed that the presence of dung beetles can speed up rates of dung decomposition in pastures where cattle graze. Her work showed that the value of British dung beetles is £367 million because of the work they do breaking down cattle dung and fertilising soil, she also calculated that if cattle anti worming medicines such as ivermectin were not used then the value would increase by £6.2m

Beynon was an entomological consultant on the Beetle Boy trilogy of children's fiction books by M G Leonard and has appeared at the Hay festival with the author.

== Media presenting ==
During her DPhil at the University of Oxford, Beynon presented her research in several programmes including BBC Springwatch as well as Countryfile, Discovery Channel's Eating Giants: Hippo and Channel 4's Jimmy's Forest.

She was an expert on BBC Operation Cloud Lab: Secrets of the Skies in 2014 and then featured on Countryfile again and BBC Radio 4's Midweek in 2015.

In 2020, she appeared on BBC Radio 4's The Museum of Curiosity, introduced by John Lloyd as an 'entomological agrarian', her donation to the museum was a wildflower meadow.

== The Bug Farm ==
Beynon founded The Bug Farm entomological visitor attraction in Pembrokeshire, Wales in 2013, with chef Andy Holcroft, who created the Grub Kitchen restaurant in 2015 on the site. They founded Bug Farm Foods in 2017 creating a range of foods made from insects such as cricket flour and biscuits, adding in 2019 a low fat mince made from insects and plants. Beynon and Holcroft featured in a BBC Our Lives documentary 'The Bug Grub Couple' in 2017.

== Awards and honours ==
Beynon was awarded the Alfred Russel Wallace award in late 2013 by the Royal Entomological Society for an outstanding PhD thesis that significantly contributes to the science of entomology.

In 2015 she was made Plantlife International Meadow Maker of the Year for Wales for her environmental work at the Bug Farm

Beynon was named as one of the Welsh Government's Year of Legends legendary people in 2017.
