= Kristen Lippincott =

American art historian

Kristen Lippincott is a London-based art historian and museums consultant. From 1990 to 2006 she worked for the National Maritime Museum, and was its Deputy Director (2000–2006) after being Director of the Royal Observatory, Greenwich (1998–2001).

In October 2013 she appeared on BBC Radio 4's The Museum of Curiosity and chose to donate "The Eureka Moment" to the hypothetical museum.

She has a BA in Comparative Literature from Bennington College, Vermont, USA (1976) and an MA (1976) and PhD (1987) in Art History from the University of Chicago.

In 1999, she was the main author of The Story of Time, a collection of texts and reflections made by several authors, among them: Umberto Eco, Ernst Gombrich, a book issued by the National Maritime Museum.
