= Richard Turner (producer) =

British radio producer

Richard Turner is a British radio producer for the BBC. He is one of the co-creators of the BBC Radio 4 panel show The Museum of Curiosity, along with John Lloyd, who also presents the series, and Dan Schreiber, who co-produces the series with Turner. He also worked as script editor for the BBC Radio 7 series The Penny Dreadfuls Present....
