= Christofer Clemente =

Australian scientist

Christofer J. Clemente
- Education: University of Western Australia
- Known for: Biomechanics research
- Awards: Australian Research Council grant (2011)
- Scientific career
- Fields: Biomechanics
- Workplaces: University of Queensland
- Thesis: Evolution of Locomotion in Australian Varanid lizards (2006)

Christofer J. Clemente is an Australian scientist specialising in biomechanics. He is a Research Fellow in the School of Biological Sciences at the University of Queensland and in 2011 was awarded a grant of A$375,000 for "Design of a biologically inspired running and climbing robotic lizard" by the Australian Research Council.

He has a B.Sc. (2000) and Ph.D. (2006) from the University of Western Australia, his doctoral thesis being on "Evolution of Locomotion in Australian Varanid lizards (Reptilia: Squamata: Varanidae): Ecomorphological and ecophysiological considerations". He has held post-doctoral positions at Cambridge (2007-2009) and Harvard (2010-2012).

In October 2013 he appeared on BBC Radio 4's The Museum of Curiosity. His hypothetical donation to this fictional museum was "a lizard popping a wheelie": he explained that when a dragon lizard reaches a certain running speed its front legs lift off the ground because they cannot match the speed of the back legs, so it acquires a bipedal gait, analogous to a bicycle's wheelie.
