= Skirt lifter =

Device for use with a long skirt

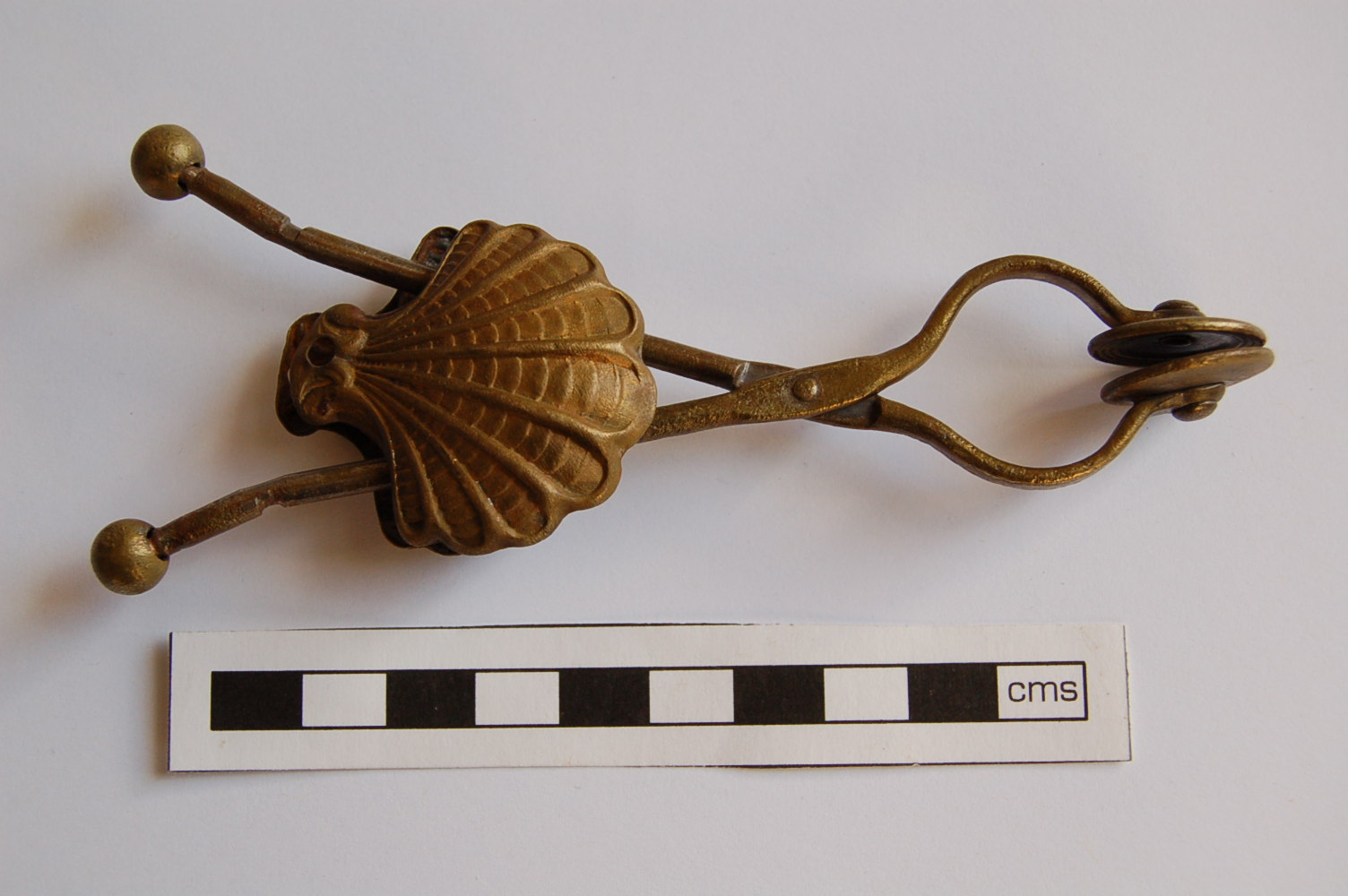
An 1870 English skirt lifter

A skirt lifter, also known as a dress lifter, skirt grip, dress suspender, hem-holder, page or porte-jupe, was a device for lifting a long skirt to avoid dirt or to facilitate movement. It clamped on to the hem and was attached to the belt by a cord, ribbon, or chain.

The first skirt lifters date from around 1846 and they were most popular from the 1860s to 1880s.

Costume designer Penny Rose chose a skirt lifter as her hypothetical donation to the imaginary museum in an August 2017 episode of BBC Radio 4's The Museum of Curiosity.
