= Ernestina Edem Appiah =

Ghanaian social entrepreneur

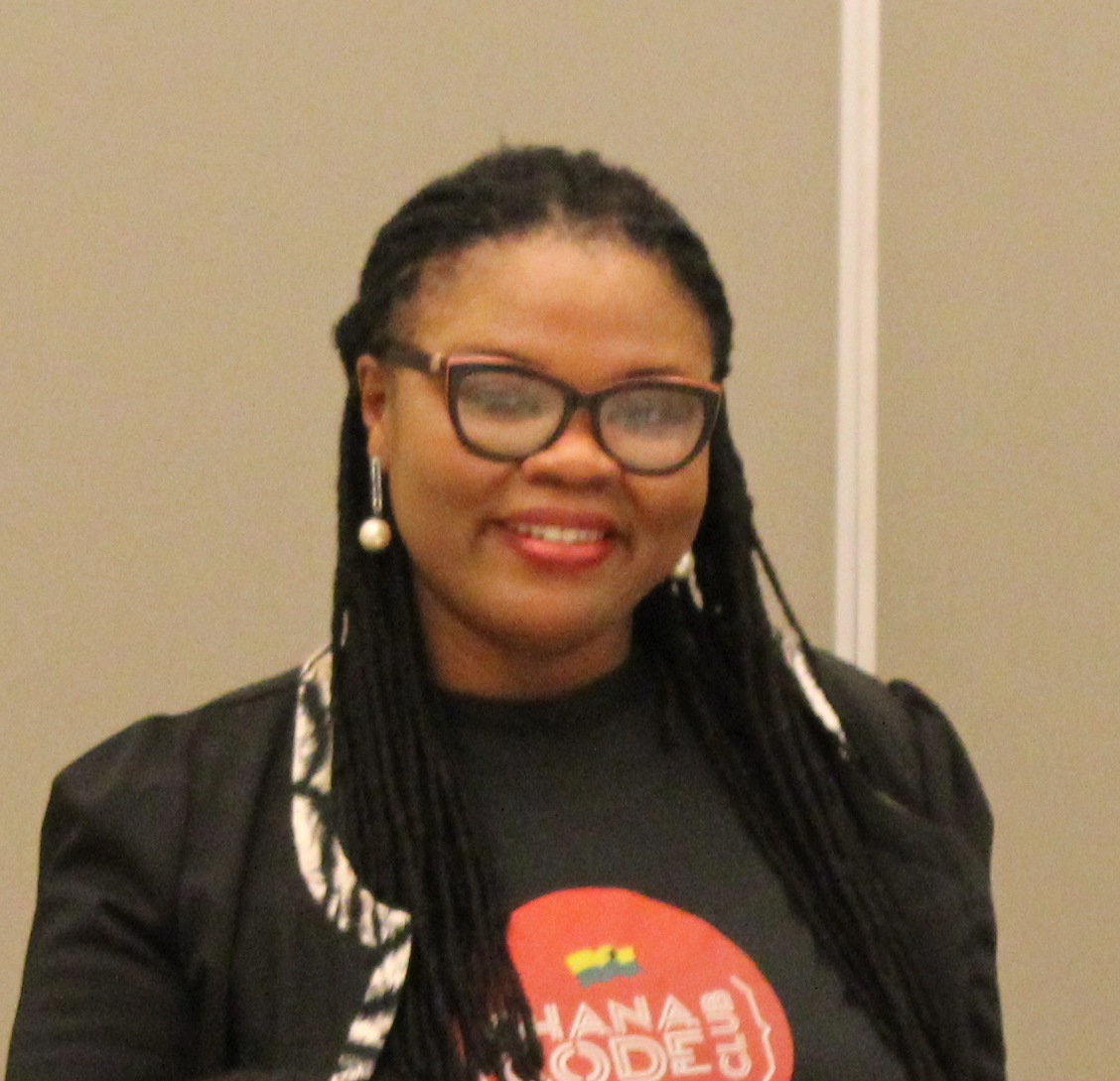
- Occupation: Social entrepreneur
- Years active: 2007–current
- Known for: IT education
- Notable work: Founder of Ghana Code Club

Ernestina Edem Appiah (born c 1977) is a Ghanaian social entrepreneur. She founded the Ghana Code Club as an after-school program to teach children how to write computer programs. In 2015, she was named to the "BBC 100 Most Inspirational Women" list for her work to promote computing in Ghana.

== Biography ==
Appiah's passion for computing began when she was employed as a secretary for a local information technology company. Inspired by the work of her colleagues, but earning less than 10% of their salary as a secretary, she learned how to code in HTML on her own, teaching herself to build websites. She transferred her IT skills into a virtual assistance business, which would become her first company.

=== Ghana Code Club ===
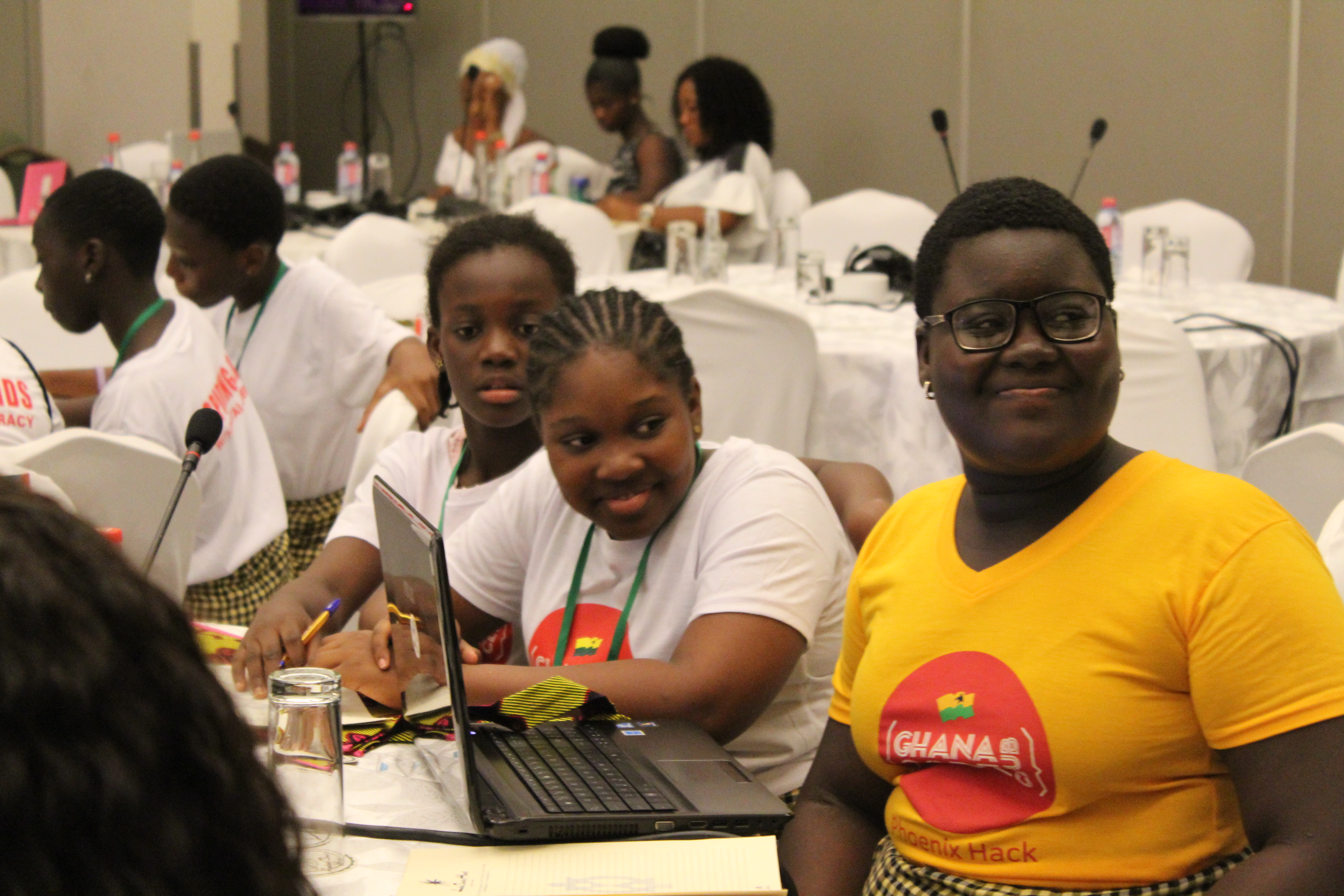
Young Coders from the Ghana Code Club at the Wikipedia workshop at the 2018 African Summit on Women and Girls in Technology

In 2007, she founded her first social enterprise, Healthy Career Initiative as a means of sharing and mentoring girls in ICT. This gave rise to the foundations of the Ghana Code Club established in the same year. Ghana Code Club is a non governmental social enterprise teaching children computer programming skills throughout Ghana.

In 2015, Appiah was named to the British Broadcasting Corporation's list of most inspirational women, the only Ghanaian woman to have made the list in that year. As of 2020, Ghana Code Club has trained 1,700 students and 300 teachers across 100 computer centers in Ghana.

=== Beyond coding ===
Today, Appiah serves as Ghana Code Club's CEO. Appiah has led Ghana Code Club to develop strategic partnerships to offer additional programming for learners in Ghana, including opening an innovation hub with Samsung. Appiah has worked to expand Ghana Code Club's educational offerings beyond coding, to address other critical skills needed in information technology, namely in artificial intelligence. In 2023, Ghana Code Club opened the Hopper Dean AI Centre in Accra's Kwabenya district, in an effort to help prepare Ghana's youth for careers in artificial intelligence. In 2024, she led a partnership collaboration between Ghana Code Club and Ecobank to support further opportunities for children's education in artificial intelligence.
