= Beth Healey =

British medical doctor

Beth Healey (born 1986 or 1987) is a British medical doctor who spent a year in Antarctica at Concordia Station, a French-Italian base, as a Research MD. She worked for the European Space Agency, researching the effects of physical and psychological isolation on a group of people. Concordia has been called "The White Mars", the nearest equivalent on earth to the kind of isolation which would be experienced by long-distance space travellers.

== Early life and education ==
Beth Healey grew up in Ballingham, Herefordshire, and attended Hereford Sixth Form College before studying medicine at Bristol University.

== Career and research ==
After finishing her course at the university, she went on to become a junior doctor in Chelsea and Westminster Hospital, working in the Accident and Emergency Ward.

In August 2017, she appeared on BBC Radio 4's The Museum of Curiosity. Her hypothetical donation to this imaginary museum was the International Space Station.

With an interest in extreme conditions, Beth Healey spent 105 days in Concordia, Antarctica, described as White Mars, to research on the medical advances that can be done while in extreme conditions for example the International Space Station. Healey was selected by the European Space Agency to investigating long duration space flight missions through physiological and psychological experiments that would allow astronauts to withstand a longer time on the Moon or on Mars. She conducted five experiments looking at how humans adapt to living in isolation and at high altitudes.
