= Olivia Potts =

British cookery writer

Olivia "Livvy" Potts is a British food writer and caterer.

== Early life, education and legal career ==
She grew up in Newcastle and studied English at Corpus Christi College, Cambridge. During her time at Cambridge she was president of the Cambridge Union. She then studied law at City, University of London and was called to the bar in 2011, practising criminal law for five years.

== Food career ==
Soon after Potts had qualified as a barrister, her mother died suddenly aged 54. Potts found that cooking, especially baking, helped her to cope with her loss, and took this further by enrolling for a nine-month pâtisserie diploma course at Le Cordon Bleu in London. She wrote about this part of her life in a memoir, A Half Baked Idea, which was published in 2020, and won the Debut Book section of the Fortnum & Mason Food and Drink Awards. She won the Guild of Food Writers award for Food Writing in 2020, for her writing in Slightly Foxed, The Guardian, Grazia, The Spectator and Glamour. Her second book, Butter, a cookery book, appeared in 2022; Nigella Lawson said of it that Potts "explains, educates, inspires, and writes like an angel with devilish wit".

She writes on food for publications including The Spectator and North-West England website Confidentials.com.

On 27 February 2023, Potts was a guest on BBC Radio 4's The Museum of Curiosity. Her hypothetical donation to this imaginary museum was a jar of marmalade.

== Personal life ==
Potts lives with her husband and child in the west of Greater Manchester.

== Selected publications ==
- Potts, Olivia (2022). Butter: a celebration. London: Headline Home. ISBN 978-1472284648.
- Potts, Olivia (2020). A half baked idea: how grief, love and cake took me from the courtroom to Le Cordon Bleu. Penguin. ISBN 978-0241380468.
