= Sotheby's Institute of Art =

For-profit art school based in New York

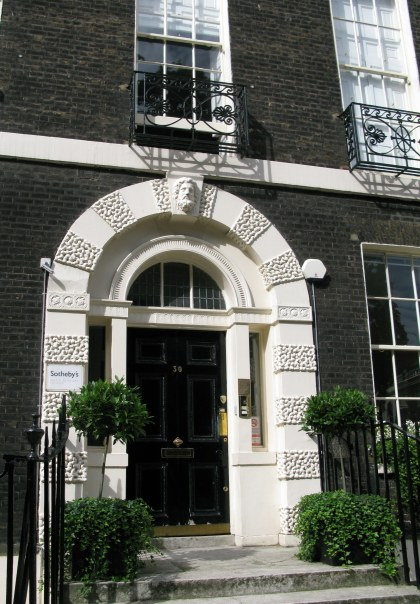
- Sotheby's Institute of Art in Bedford Square, London
- Founder: Sotheby's
- Established: 1969
- Faculty: 3
- Adjunct faculty: 22
- Members: 175 students
- Website: sothebysinstitute.com

Sotheby's Institute of Art is a private, for-profit college in London and New York City and online.

== History ==
Originally conceived as a training program for connoisseurship by Sotheby's auction house in 1969, Sotheby's Institute of Art aims to provide students with education on the business of art while exploring both the scholarly and practical sides of the art world.

In 1995, Sotheby's Institute of Art – London was granted the status of an Affiliated Institution of the University of Manchester's Department of Art History and Archaeology. At the end of 2002, Sotheby's sold its Institute to a US-based information and educational services firm, Cambridge Information Group (CIG), which retains the Sotheby's name. Sotheby's Institute continues to have strong links with Sotheby's auction house, having members on the Sotheby's Institute of Art – London advisory board and students having access to internships, auctions and exhibitions at Sotheby's. From September 2023 a partnership with Culture&, a Black arts and education charity, attempts to increase diversity in the UK art world by offering scholarships for courses within the institute's Masters programmes to students from under-represented communities.

In September 2006, the Institute broadened its course offerings in New York and in 2010 the New York Institute received degree-granting authority from the Regents of the State of New York. It has been an accredited member of the National Association of Schools of Art and Design since 1989. Between 2013 and 2019 Sotheby's Institute in partnership with the Peter F. Drucker and Masatoshi Ito Graduate School of Management at Claremont Graduate University, established a new master's degree in Art Business. The institute also began offering courses in mainland China in 2013 and in March 2014 announced a partnership with Tsinghua University to offer a six-week international field study programme with a professional certificate.

As of December 2023, the New York branch of the school was on the list for heightened cash monitoring 2 for problems related to financial responsibility by the US Department of Education.

== Academics ==
The Institute runs full-time master's degree programs in Art Business, Contemporary Art, Fine and Decorative Art, East Asian Art and Contemporary Design. In the summer, the institute offers two week and month long certificate programs in topics ranging from curation to art evaluation and provenance research.

At the London campus, master's degrees are awarded by the University of Manchester. In New York, master's degrees are granted through the Regents of the State of New York and accredited by the National Association of Schools of Art and Design.

== Campuses ==
Sotheby's Institute London is situated in Bedford Square, Bloomsbury (51°31′07″N 0°07′52″W), a well-preserved Georgian square with a private central garden, built between 1775 and 1783. The New York campus is located in the General Electric Building in midtown Manhattan (40°45′25″N 73°58′21″W).

=== Library ===
The libraries on the London and New York campuses collectively contain more than 3 million volumes, 350 databases, 70 print subscriptions, and 126 serials—all of which are academic in nature and related to art and the art market.

== Relationship with Sotheby's auction house ==
Sotheby's Institute of Art was founded by Sotheby's auction house in London in 1969. Initially, the Institute served as a training program for auction house employees and provided lessons in connoisseurship. Auction house experts and professionals often serve as Sotheby's Institute of Art faculty and guest speakers.

The Kiddell Collection (also known as "The Black Museum") is an accumulation of fakes, forgeries, and reproductions, built up over a number of decades by Sotheby's Auction House former director, Jim Kiddell. It is now on permanent loan to Sotheby's Institute of Art in London. Originally a resource for auction house employees, the collection continues to be used for teaching and research.
