= Ghana Code Club =

Computer programming club in Ghana

- The logo of Ghana Code Club
- Founder: Ernestina Edem Appiah
- Type: Nonprofit organisation
- Location: Ghana
- Services: Education in computer programming
- Methods: Classroom teaching
- Website: Official website

The Ghana Code Club is an after-school programme in Ghana that teaches children computer programming skills. The programme was founded by Ernestina Edem Appiah, and the programme is organized in various schools by Healthy Career Initiative, a nonprofit organisation in Ghana. Healthy Career Initiative was also founded by Appiah, in 2007. Ghana Code Club is a digital fun club that is being organized in schools in Ghana for children between the ages of 8–17. It is an after-school extracurricular programme.

As of January 2016 in Ghana, the present information communications technology curriculum in Ghana does not include learning activities for technology. The club encourages children to attain modern skills in computer technology to help them with future careers. Some of the activities include learning how to create websites, animations and video games. In January 2016, the programme began operations in five schools, and the organisation is prepared to expand into most schools in Ghana in 2016, with a goal of educating at least 20,000 children.

Challenges faced by the Ghana Code Club includes problems with internet connectivity in Ghana, and access to capital and computer equipment. As a result, a significant portion of the classes are presently taught on paper with printouts.

== History ==
The founder and CEO of Ghana Code Club is Ernestina Edem Appiah, her interest was initiated by an article she read about children in the United Kingdom learning coding (computer programming). Appiah was one of the BBC's 100 Women.

== See also ==
- CoderDojo
