= List of former Wrestling Society X personnel =

This is a list of former employees of the professional wrestling promotion Wrestling Society X. Wrestling Society X was founded in 2007. All wrestlers listed competed in the original incarnation of WSX.

== Alumni ==
=== Male wrestlers ===
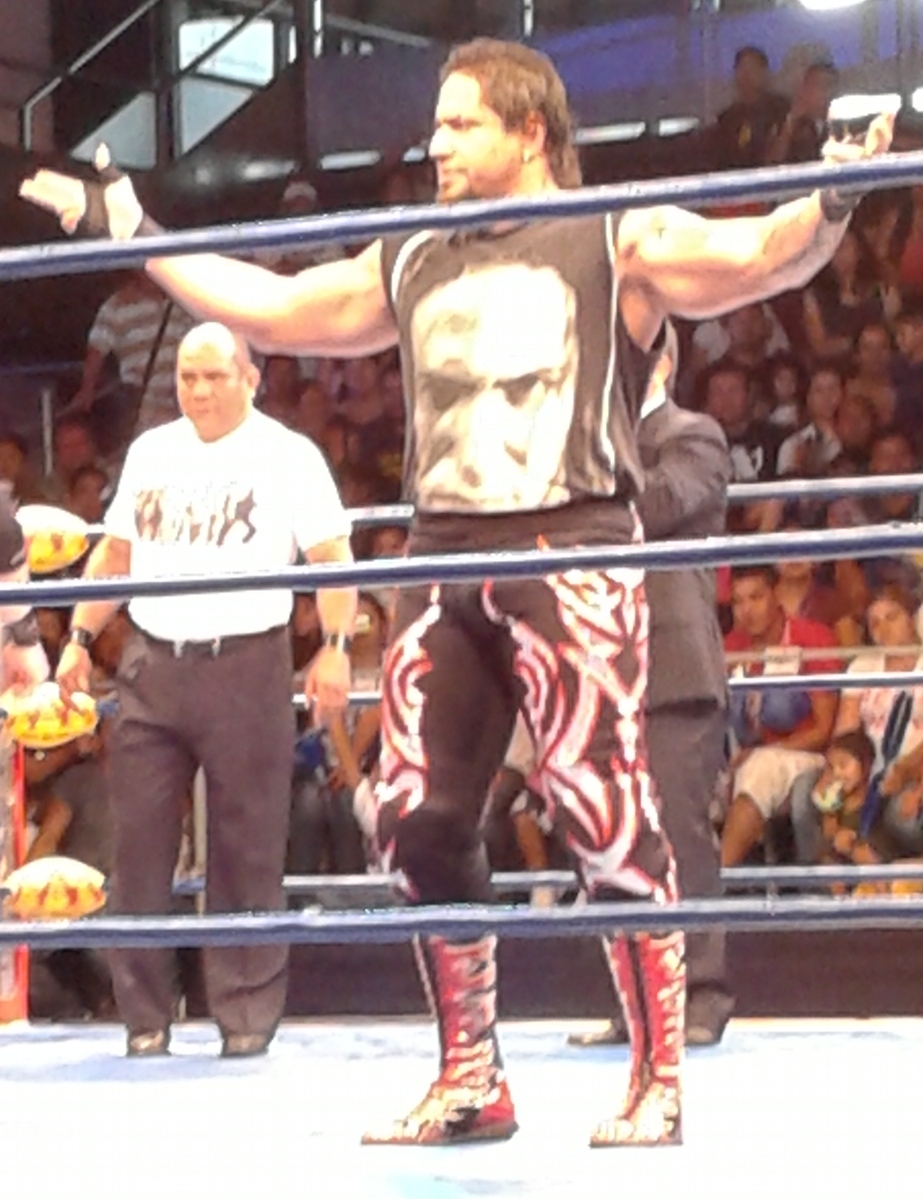
Ricky Banderas

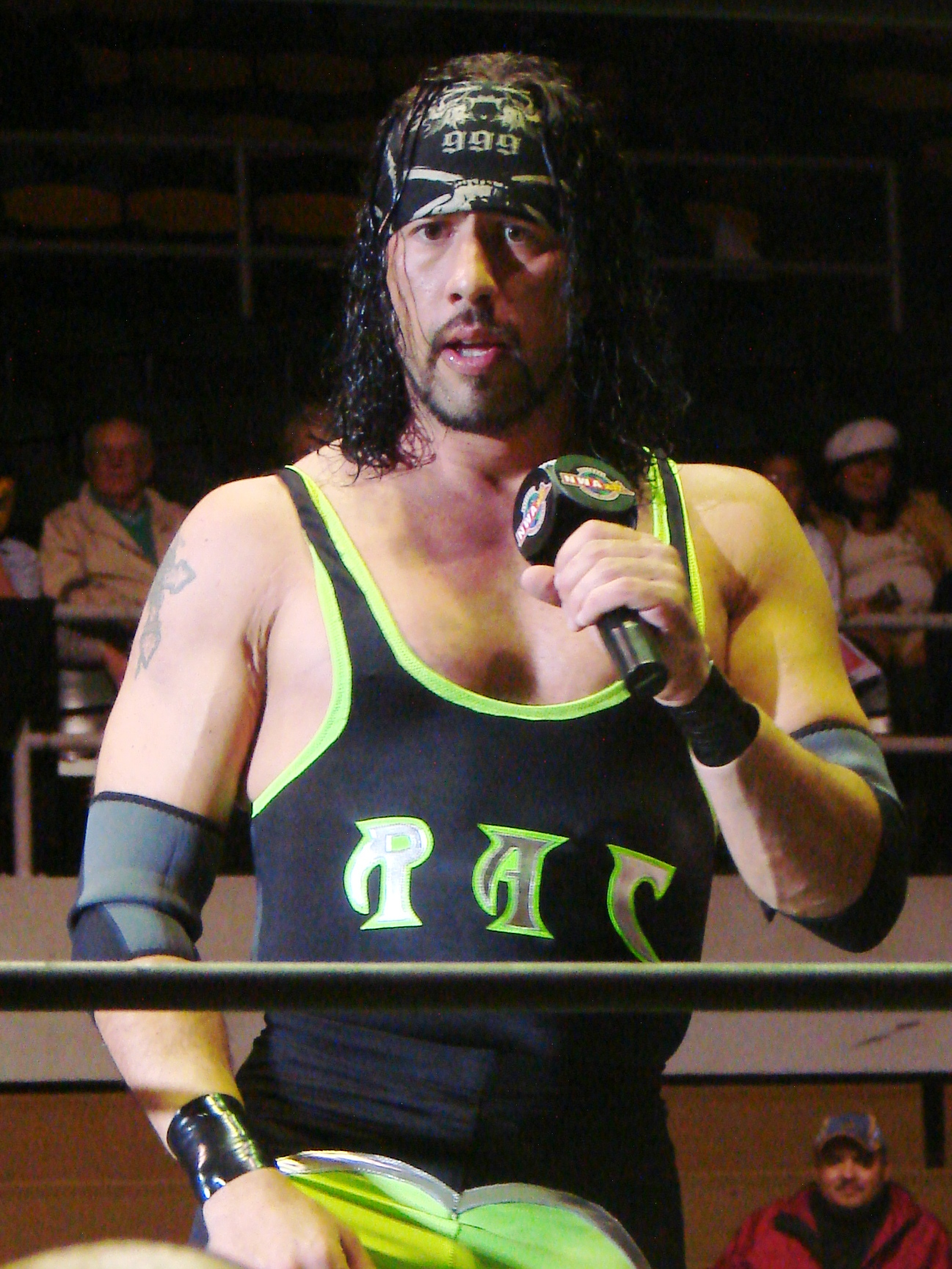
6-Pac

Ring name	Notes
6-Pac	
Aaron Aguilera	
Alkatrazz	
Arik Cannon	
Babi Slymm	
Chris Hamrick	
Delikado	
Disco Machine	
El Hombre Blanco Enmascarado	
Horiguchi	
The Human Tornado	
Jack Evans	
Jimmy Jacobs	
Joey Ryan	
Josh Raymond	
Justin Credible	
Kaos	
Lil' Cholo	
Luke Hawx	
Marcus Riot	
Matt Classic	
Matt Sydal	
Matt Cross	
Mongol	
Nate Webb	
New Jack	
Puma	
Ricky Banderas	
Ruckus	
Scorpio Sky	
Teddy Hart	
Tyler Black	
Vampiro	
Vic Grimes	
Yoshino	
Youth Suicide	

=== Female wrestlers ===
Ring name	Notes
Mickie Knuckles	

Managers

- El Jefé
- Johnny Webb
- Lizzy Valentine
- Nic Grimes
- Sakoda

Stables and Tag Teams

- Alkatrazz & Luke Hawx
- Arik Cannon & Vic Grimes, with Nic Grimes
- The Cartel (Delikado, Lil’ Cholo & Mongol) with El Jefé
- Do It For Her (Jimmy Jacobs & Tyler Black)
- The Filth and The Fury (Teddy Hart & Matt Cross)
- Keepin’ It Gangsta (Ruckus & Babi Slymm)
- Los Pochos Guapos (Aaron Aguilera & Kaos)
- Team Big Japan Pro Wrestling (Kamitani & Ito) with Nate Webb
- Team Dragon Gate (Horiguchi & Yoshino) with Sakoda
- That 70's Team (Joey Ryan & The Disco Machine)
- The Trailer Park Boyz (Nate Webb & Josh Raymond) with Johnny Webb

Broadcast Team

- Fabian Kaelin – ring announcer, co-host of WSXtra
- Kris Kloss – play-by-play analyst
- Lacey – interviewer/correspondent, co-host of WSXtra

Referees

- Danny Ramirez
- John Moore
- Patrick Hernandez
- Rick Knox

== See also ==
- Wrestling Society X
