= Victoria Finlay =

British writer and journalist

Victoria Finlay is a British writer and journalist, known for her books on colour and jewels. Her best-known book is Colour: Travels through the Paintbox.

== Career ==
Finlay, born in 1964, studied social anthropology at St Andrew's University, Scotland, and the College of William & Mary, Virginia, after which she joined Reuters. From 1991 to 2003 Finlay worked in Hong Kong as a journalist. By the time of the handover in 1997, she was arts editor of the South China Morning Post.

Finlay had become obsessed with colour as a child, when her father took her to Chartres Cathedral and said that people were no longer able to make the blue in the stained glass. In 2000, she decided to investigate this and other aspects of colour; Colour: Travels through the Paintbox was published in 2002.

Finlay has worked in radio presenting, and was director of communications for the Alliance of Religions and Conservation.

== Works ==
- Colour: Travels through the Paintbox published in North America as Color: A Natural History of the Palette (2002) ISBN 978-0812971422
- Buried Treasure published in the United States as Jewels: A Secret History
- Palmer, M and Finlay, V. (2003) Faith in Conservation; New Approaches to Religions and the Environment, Washington DC, The World Bank
- Fabric: The Hidden History of the Material World (2021) ISBN 978-1781257067
- The Brilliant History of Color in Art (2014) ISBN 978-1606064290
