= Longmen Township, Ya'an =

Longmen Township 龙门乡
- Township
- Location in Sichuan
- Coordinates: 30°15′19″N 103°01′00″E
- Country: People's Republic of China
- Province: Sichuan
- Prefecture-level city: Ya'an
- County: Lushan
- Village-level divisions: 6 villages
- Elevation: 771 m (2,530 ft)
- Time zone: UTC+8 (China Standard)
- Area code: 0835

Longmen Township (simplified Chinese: 龙门乡; traditional Chinese: 龍門鄉; pinyin: Lóngmén Xiāng; lit. 'dragon door') is a township of Lushan County in a valley on the western edge of the Sichuan Basin of Sichuan province, China, located about 14 kilometres (8.7 mi) northeast of the county seat. As of 2011, it has six villages under its administration. On 20 April 2013, the township was the location of the epicentre of a magnitude 6.6 earthquake.
