= James Whelton =

Irish software developer and computing club promoter

James Whelton is an Irish computer coder, venture capital advisor, and co-founder of CoderDojo, a network of free computer clubs for children.

At the age of 16, Whelton became famous for hacking the iPod Nano and creating watch faces for the device. In 2011, at the age of 18, he co-founded, CoderDojo, along with entrepreneur Bill Liao. Whelton headed up his school's computer club in Cork, Ireland. After CoderDojo was established, he became an entrepreneur-in-residence at Polaris Ventures.
