= Dragon Gate Team =

Hong Kong League of Legends team

- Short name: DG
- Game: League of Legends
- Founded: 29 November 2018
- Folded: 24 April 2019
- League: League of Legends Master Series
- Based in: Hong Kong
- Parent group: Hong Kong Fish Dive International Culture Media Limited

Dragon Gate Team was a professional League of Legends team based in Hong Kong and active for one split in 2019. It competed in the League of Legends Master Series (LMS) – then the game's tier-one league in Taiwan, Hong Kong, and Macau – until it was removed for allegedly coercing its players to match fix.

== History ==
Garena, the organisers of the LMS, announced on 29 November 2018 that Hong Kong Fish Dive International Culture Media Limited had acquired Team Afro's spot in the league and established Dragon Gate Team to replace Team Afro. Dragon Gate Team finished last in the 2019 spring split and was scheduled to play a relegation match against Taiwanese team Super Esports on 25 April 2019. However, a day before the match, Garena announced that Dragon Gate Team had been removed and banned from the LMS in light of credible allegations that the team's staff and players had been match fixing and betting on their own games.

Garena stated that it had received reports of possible match fixing by Dragon Gate Team on 10 April, and sent relevant evidence to Riot Games, the developer of League of Legends and the global organiser of the game's esports leagues, on 17 April. Consequently, Dragon Gate Team's owner Hu Weijie was permanently banned from involvement with a professional or semi-professional League of Legends team, while the team's jungler Liu "JGY" Yang received the same punishment for 18 months and the two coaches Fan Jiangpeng and Li Xinyu for a year. Super Esports was given Dragon Gate Team's LMS spot but ultimately disqualified for failing to submit documents in time. Dragon Gate Team's management responded to the announcement by threatening to sue Garena, claiming the allegations had been fabricated because its players were in deep gambling debts and Garena favoured Super Esports over Dragon Gate Team.

On the same day as Garena's announcement, Dragon Gate Team's top laner Huang "2188" Jin-long made a Facebook post alleging that management had offered bot laner Liu "Soul" Kai 5,000 renminbi per match thrown by him, and had replaced him after he refused. 2188 also claimed that JGY's acceptance of the offer in contrast had negatively impacted his teammate's performances as well; JGY was noted for his unorthodox, overly-aggressive playstyle.
