= Culture& =

British diversity charity

Culture&, formerly Cultural Co-operation, is a British charity which "work[s] in partnership with arts and heritage institutions and artists to develop programmes that promote diversity in the workforce and expand audiences". Miranda Lowe was appointed its chair in March 2021.
