= Dragon Gate (Sweden) =

Unfinished business and culture center in Sweden

Coordinates: 60°27′45.19″N 17°24′55.09″E

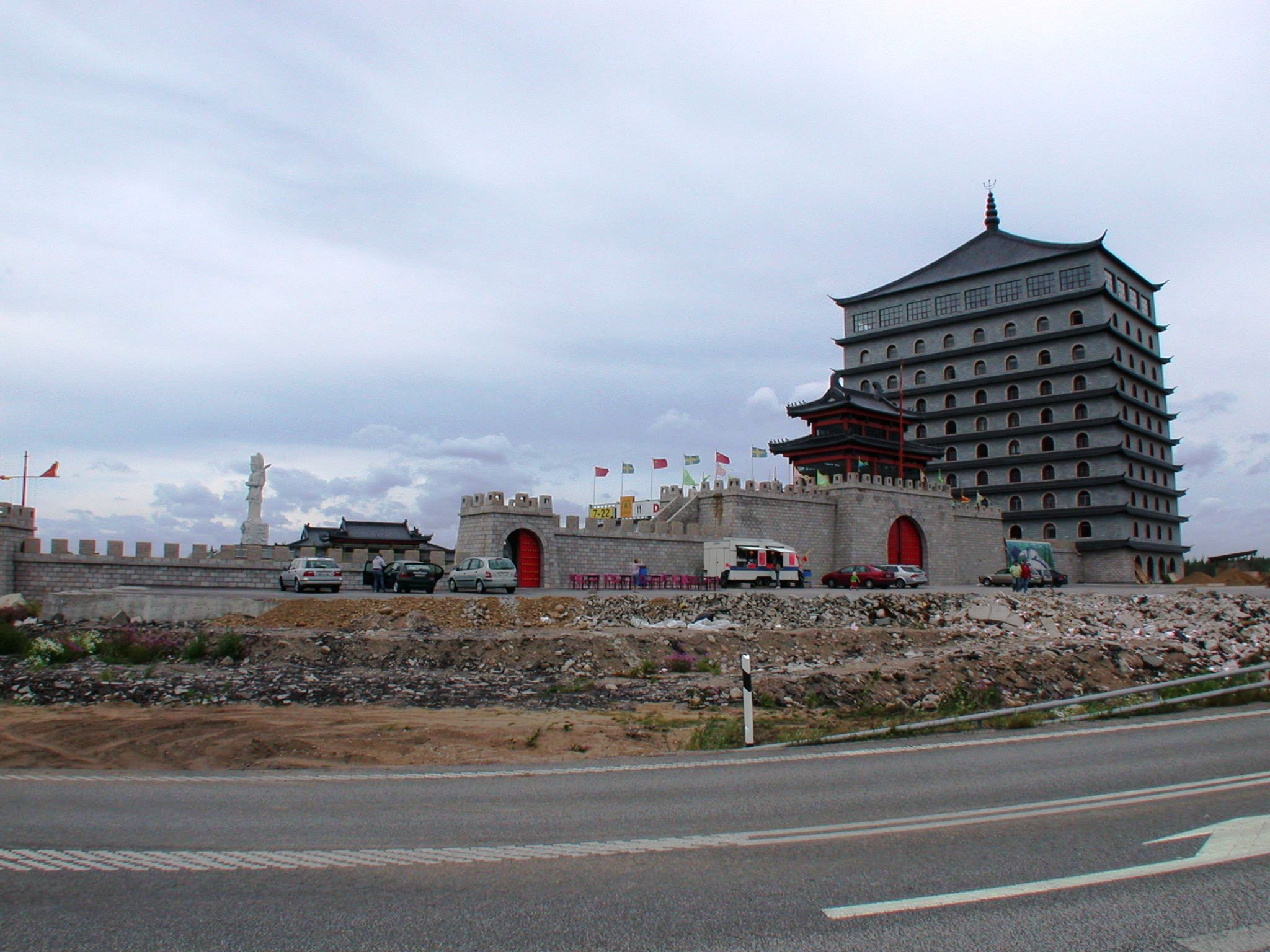
Dragon Gate.

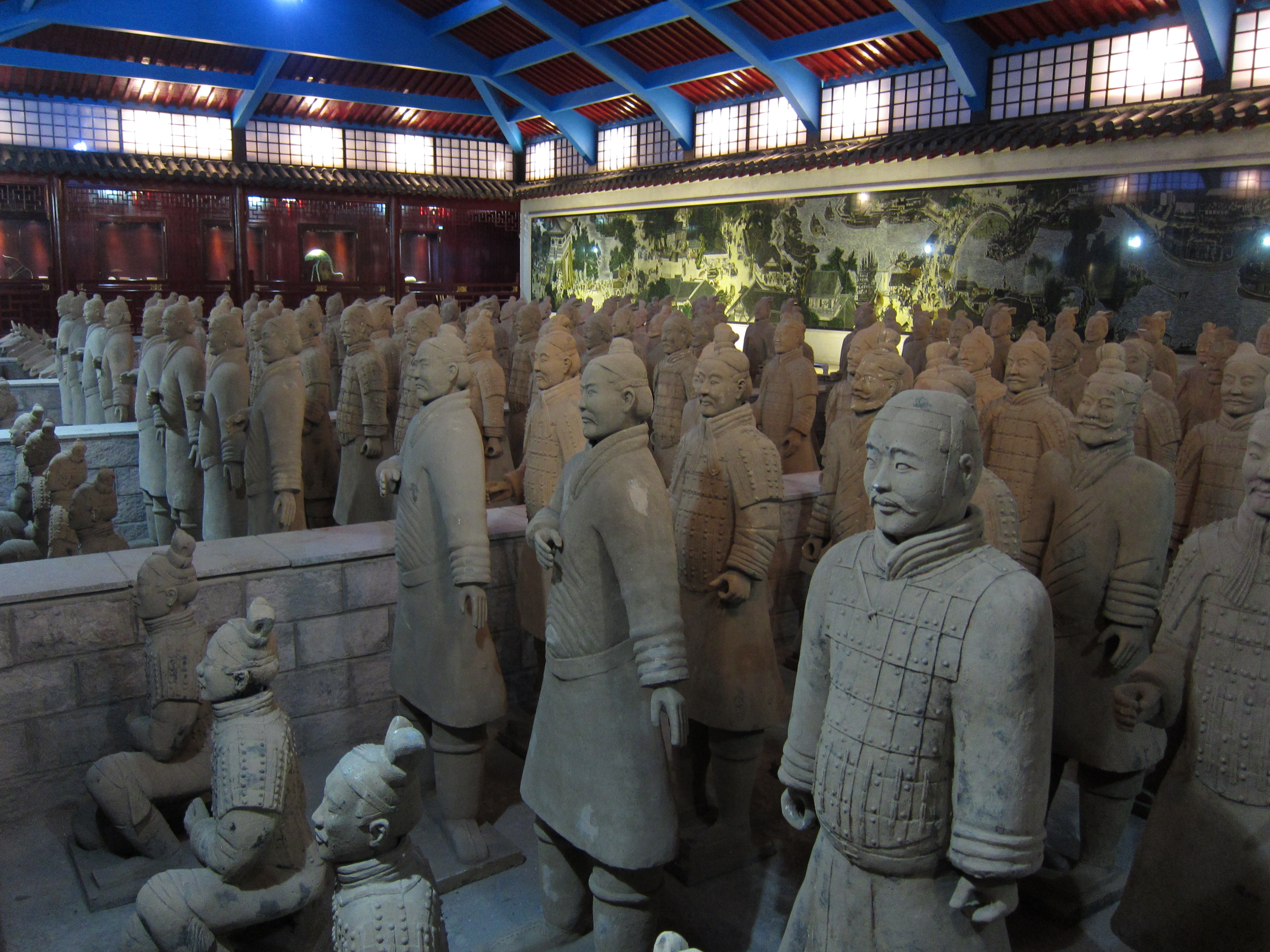
Terracotta Army, Dragon Gate museum

Dragon Gate is an unfinished business and culture center in Älvkarleby Municipality near European route E4. The idea was to create a place where Chinese and Swedish culture can meet.

The project was started in 2004, and the first stage was completed in 2008, when the center's museum was opened to the public. The tourist and culture activity at Dragon Gate is run by Eastern Expo Center AB. In 2016 the hotel was given the green light by Älvkarleby municipality to open.

== Background ==
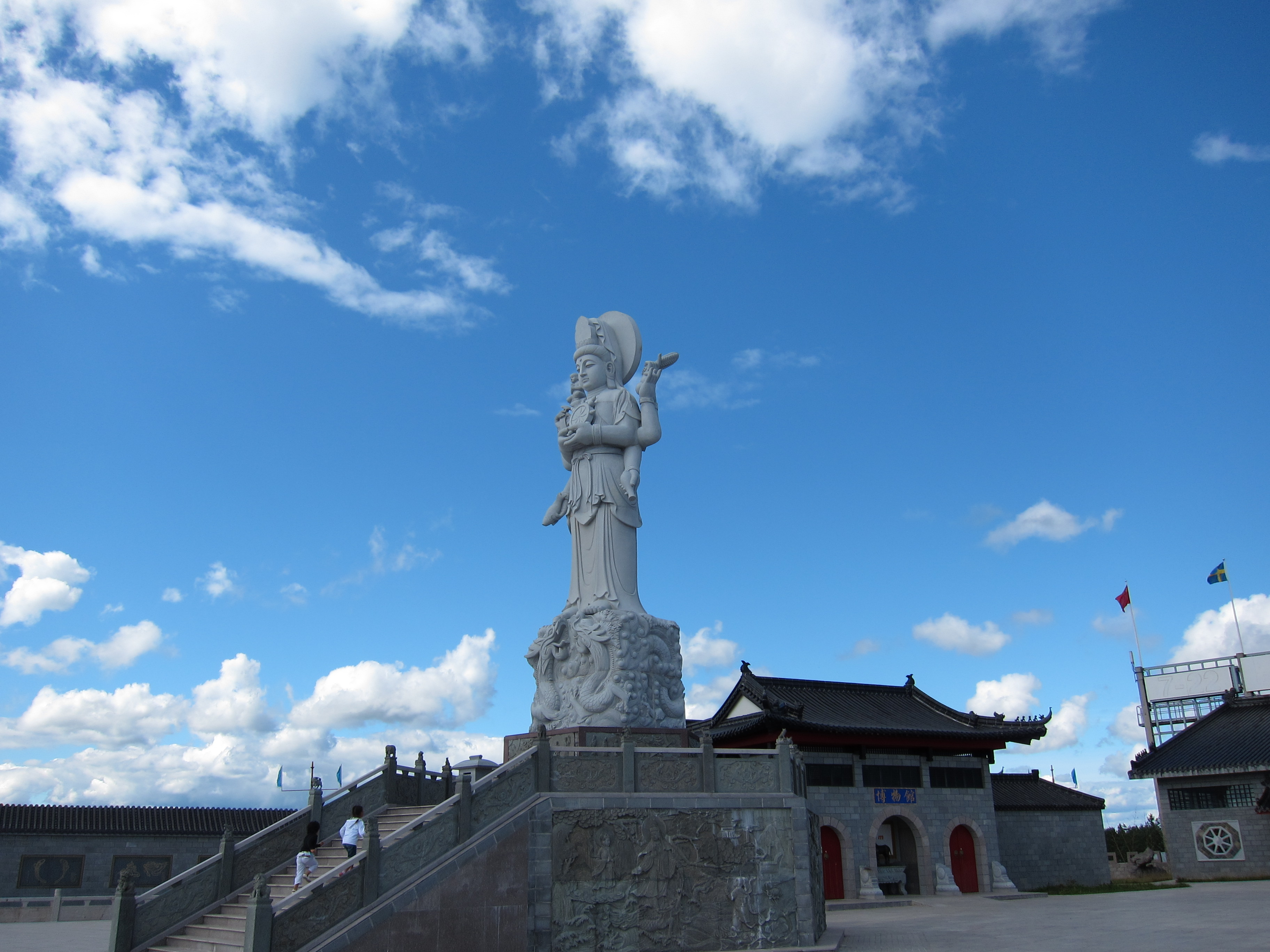
Statue of the Buddhist saint Guanyin

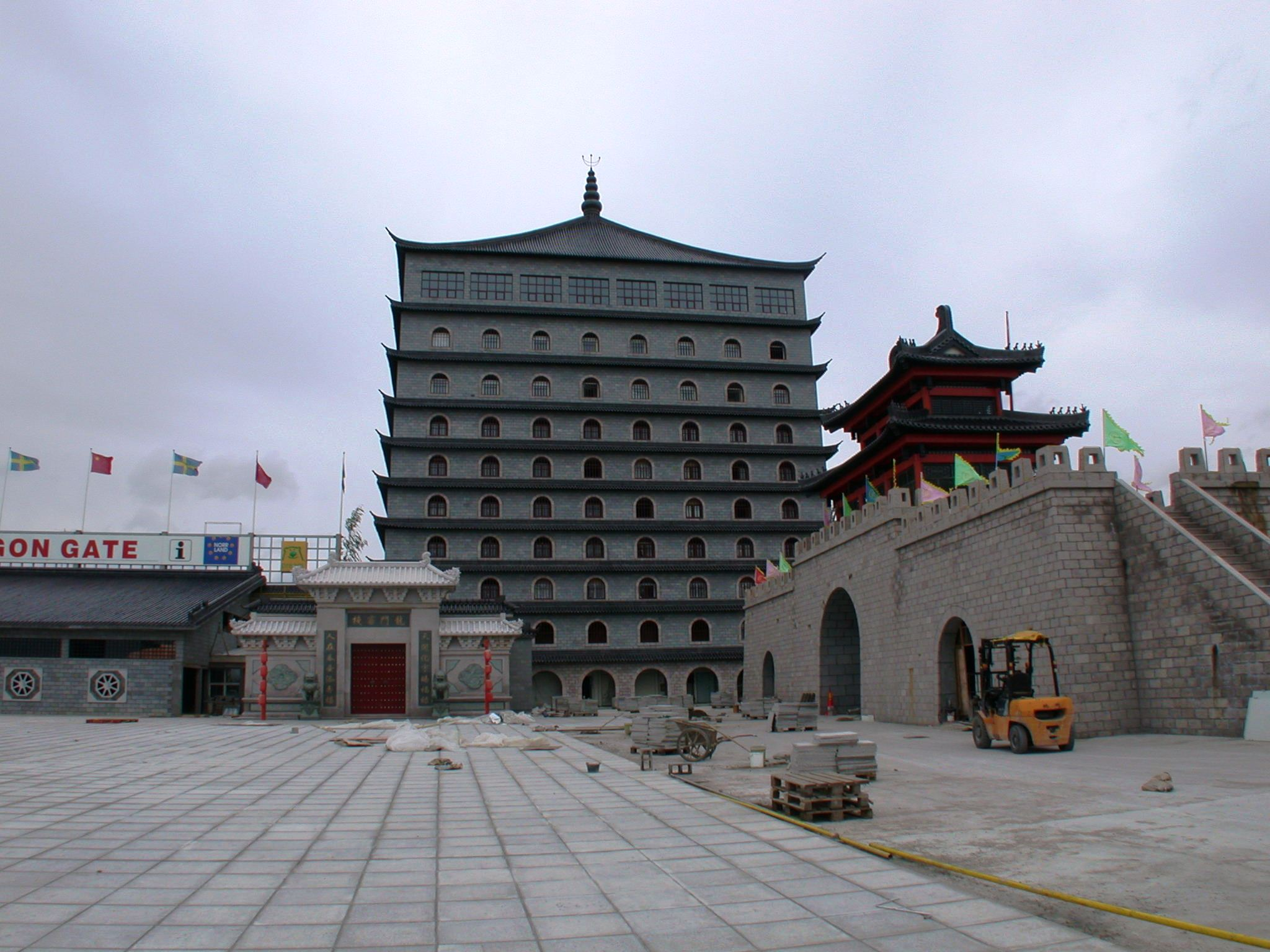
The inner courtyard as it looked in 2007. In the background the not yet completed hotel and the entrance to the restaurant.

Dragon Gate (龙门, Lóngmén) was originally named Hotel Älvkarlen and was built in 1986 by the company Östanå owned by Älvkarleby municipality. 1988 the business went into bankruptcy and the following year the property was transformed into a refugee centre. 1992 Hotel Älvkarlen was sold for five million crowns to Erland Ågren and Eriks Friis and was renamed Checkpoint Dalälven. The property was resold in 2004 to the Chinese businessman Li Jingchun (李经春), from Zhejiang, who made a fortune from selling mosquito repellent.

Li Jingchun changed the name of the hotel to "Dragon Gate" and planned to rebuild the property to a venue for Swedish and Chinese businessmen to meet with support from Invest in Sweden Agency.

A Chinese square was constructed in 2007, adjacent to the hotel, and a statue of the Buddhist saint Guanyin was erected in 2005. One of the previous owners, Erland Ågren, was appointed Dragon Gate's first CEO. In 2008 Jonas Jonsson took over as CEO. He quit within a year. The current CEO is Kenny Li.

The plan for a Chinese-Swedish business center was changed to encompass a restaurant, a hotel, museum and a Shaolin monastery including a Kung fu-school.

By 2019 the hotel had still not yet opened. On August 31, 2018, it was announced that the real estate company Sisyfos had bought Dragon Gate.

== Dragon Museum ==
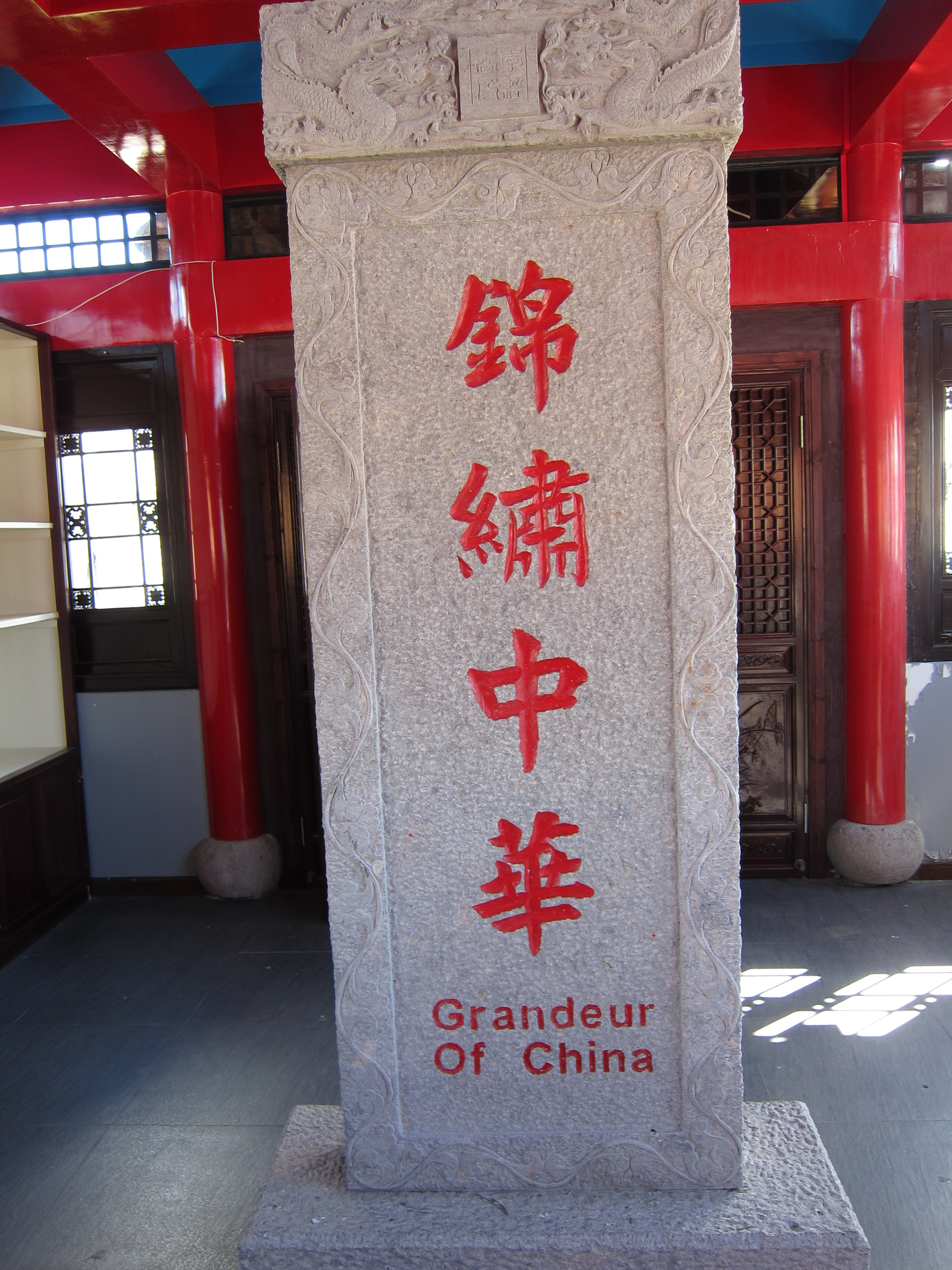
The sign at the entrance to the exhibition "The grandeur of China".

Dragon Museum carry an overview of China, its development, nature- and culture geography and architecture. In a 150-metre arcade, the museum has the world's longest wooden relief, as a part of a larger photography exhibit.

== The Terracotta Army ==
The museum has through its collaboration with a museum in Xi'an received about 200 copied terracotta soldiers in original size. These constitute an exhibition concerning the Terracotta Army and Chinas first emperor.

== Bankruptcy ==
The companies with activities in Dragon Gate have had different owners. A former chairman of the board, James Guozan Shi, ran several companies until 2009, after which Li Jingchun and Shi parted. The companies went into bankruptcy, and the business was taken over by the current CEO, Kenny Li.

== Criticism ==
The construction company Latep has been criticized for poor working conditions since the project began. Swedish Work Environment Authority have handled 13 matters concerning the construction and has imposed the company responsible, Latep AB, to pay a fine of 1.1 million crowns for violations of the Working Environment Act. In 2006 Dragon Gate was named the worst construction of the year by the union magazine Byggnadsarbetaren.

During the spring of 2008 it was reported that parts of the center had been built without planning permissions.

== In popular culture ==
In December 2020, comedian Nigel Ng (also well known as Uncle Roger), visited and featured Dragon Gate in one of his YouTube video.
