= The Free Association =

London-based improvised comedy theatre and school

The Free Association, or The FA, is an improvised comedy theatre and school, based in London. It is currently among the largest providers of improvisation training in the UK.

== History ==
The Free Association was founded as a performance group in 2014 by Austentatious cast member Graham Dickson and sketch comedy duo Max and Ivan; alongside Nell Mooney, Jessica Ransom, Freya Parker and Joseph Morpurgo.

The group grew to become a theatre and school, hosted shows and classes at their main theatre above the De Beauvoir Arms in Haggerston, London and the Lord Stanley in Camden, London from 2015 to 2025. They also toured shows to Soho Theatre, Underbelly Boulevard and Edinburgh Fringe Festival.

Dickson served as Artistic Director of the theatre until 2022, succeeded by Naomi Petersen until 2024. Since 2025, the theatre has been programmed by an Artistic Committee, composed of Katharine Bennett-Fox, Sam Roulston and Briony Redman.

After 11 years operating from a fringe venue in East London, The FA opened its first permanent venue in London, UK, in October 2025. The arts venue, based on Old Union Yard Arches in Southwark, South London, features a café, bar and 104-seat theatre. Opening on the 16th of October, The Free Association's venue is a home for improv and alternative comedy in the UK.

== Philosophy ==
As the UK's equivalent to American improv theatres UCB, IO and The Second City, the FA primarily performs long-form improvisation. The FA's main focus is the "game of the scene", the Harold, and narrative improvisation.

== FA headline shows / house teams ==
The following shows perform regularly at The Free Association, mainly comprising graduates and current students.

=== Current Headline Shows ===
| Team Name | Activity | Cast Members | Performance |
|---|---|---|---|
| It Came From Nowhere | 2026 - Present | Alex Holland, Alison Thea-Skot, Chris Gau, Liz Gutterbock, Mariam Haque, Megan McCarthy, Patrick Dishman, Rob Sladden, Scott Oswald, Sumina Kasuji | Organic |
| This Doesn't Leave The Room | 2023 - Present | 2026 - Present: Alexandra Smith, Freya Slipper, Jonathan Broke, Lola-Rose Maxwell, Max Dickins, Naomi Petersen, Patrick Nevels, Rob Gilbert, Sam Roulston, Sarah Lewis 2023 - 2026: Graham Dickson, Alex Holland, Robert Gilbert, Naomi Petersen, Sophia Broido, Charlie Kemp, Megan McCarthy, Ishan Ganjoor, Sam Roulston, Freya Slipper, Sophia Broido, Lola-Rose Maxwell, Mariam Haque, Alexandra Smith Previous guests: Jamie Laing, Tatty Macleod, Ania Magliano, Kiell Smith-Bynoe, Nic Sampson, Emma Sidi, Will Hines, Billy Merritt, Jim Woods, Paul Gorton, Phil Wang, Jessica Knappett, Steen Raskopoulos, Sophia Duker, Lara Ricote, Stuart Laws, Lorna Rose Treen, George Fouracres, Monica Heisey, Alice Snedden, Gus Khan, Amelia Dimoldenberg, Hayley Morris Amy Gledhill, Eli Matthewson, Jake Bhardwaj, Drea Valls, Sophie Garrad, Mark Bittlestone, Ed Jones, Marty Gleeson, Jiavani Linayao, D.J. Mausner, Ambika Mod | Armando |
| Popband: The Ending Starts Tonight Again | 2026 - Present | Jay Bennett, Liz Guterbock, Tamar Broadbent, Kiran Benawra, Kat Bond, Charlotte Clitherow | Musical |
| Mailbox #23 | 2026 - Present | Cast: Graham Dickson, Holly Laurent, Greg Hess Previous Guests: Kiell Smith-Bynoe, Charlie Kemp, Charlotte Gittins, Patrick Nevels, Naomi Petersen, Alison Thea-Skot, David Elms, Alex Holland, Kat Bond, Katherine Bennett-Fox | Premise / Monoscene |
| 3 | 2023 - Present | Cast: Graham Dickson, Helen Duff, Rob Gilbert, Shaun Lowthian, Lola-Rose Maxwell, Scott Oswald, Naomi Petersen, Haley McGee, Jonathan Broke, Marian Haque Previous guests: Steen Raskopoulos, Oliver Chris, Ambika Mod, Kiell Smith-Bynoe , Cariad Lloyd, Anna Leong Brophy, Alfred Chow, Alice Snedden, Suzi Barrett, Casey Feigh | Monoscene |
| St Doctor's Hospital | 2021 - Present | Kiran Benawra, Kat Bond, Ian Thomas Day, Graham Dickson, Nadège Nguyen, Patrick Dishman, Chris Gau, Shaun Lowthian, Haley McGee, Naomi Petersen, Alison Thea-Skot, Robert Gilbert, Katharine Bennett-Fox, Charlie Kemp | Narrative |
| 666 Hell Lane | 2021 - Present | Alex Holland, Ishan Ganjoor, Laura Riseborough, Luke Healy, Alison Thea-Skot, Graham Dickson, Kiran Benawra, Kathryn Bond, Mariam Haque, Tamar Broadbent, Tara Boland | Narrative |

=== Weekend House Teams ===
| Team Name | Activity | Cast Members | Format |
|---|---|---|---|
| New Narrative Team (Name TBA) | 2026 - Present | Anaïs Gralpois, Charlotte Byrne, James Alexander, Jess Rogers, Maria Guiver, Nishant Raj, Robbie Taylor Hunt, Will Beynon | Narrative |
| Fresh, Wow! Thank You | 2026 - Present | Jodie Irvine, Holly Casey, Romy Chaggar, Sara Shanazarian, Chris Lynch, Aren Devlin, Travis O'Connor, Clay Ballard | Organic |
| Orange Goose | 2026 - Present | Steph Farrell, Rosie Smythe, Ted Allpress, Anurag Gulati, Amy Heycock, Temi Wilkey, Will Mead, Kat Finch | Harold |

=== Previous House Teams ===
| Team Name | Activity | Cast Members | Format |
|---|---|---|---|
| TOME | 2025 - 2026 | George Collecott, Jack Barry, Karlie Menzel, Lorna Shaw, Anna Leong Brophy, Chris Rosser, Paul G. Raymond, Tom Gidman, Eleanor Hindson, Suchi Paul | Narrative |
| Hotbed | 2024 - 2026 | Miriam Craig, Eki Elaine Osewele, Kluane Saunders, Sarah Lewis, Rory Donaldson, Christoforos Epaminondas, Jarvie Ward, Sam Burkett | Harold |
| Sweetheart | 2024 - 2026 | Alistair Cohen, Hannah Pye, Nicolas Sathicq, Alex Taylor, Patrick Nevels, Alexandra Smith, Dana Birch, Betty Thompson | Harold |
| Triple Denim | 2023 - 2025 | Nadine Bailey, Greg Baxter, Olivia Chidera, Nathan Dean, Eliot J Fallows, Lelda Kapsis, Helen Kennedy, Imran Malik, Penn Ryan, Asmita Singh | Harold |
| NANA | 2022 - 2024 | Aram Balakjian, Luke Brown, Ellie Fulcher, Sumina Kasuji, Muireann Kelly, Jen Littlewood, Megan McCarthy, Gareth O'Connor, Charlie Sturgeon, Ben Nolan | Harold |
| Dream Phone | 2019 - 2022 | Kiran Benawra, Tom Levinge, Haley McGee, George Collecott, Jenny Donoghue, Tara Boland, Jack Barry, Phillip Kostelecky | Harold |
| I'm Filthy - Don't Touch Me | 2019 - 2022 | Laura Riseborough, Matt Hutson, Sammy Hannah, Jay Bennett, Doug Crossley, Will Rowland, Zoe Dunn, Jamal Khandar | Harold |
| Supreme Leader | 2019 - 2021 | Alex Bradbury, Kathryn Higgins, Nick Adamson, Flora Donald, Waleed Akhtar, Anna Carden, Victoria Beardwood, Craig Methven | Harold |
| The Millicent Tendrils Experience | 2018 - 2021 | Emma Pritchard, Lottie Field, Ambika Mod, Florence Mercer, Ishan Ganjoor, Luke Healy, Dom Ashton, Dan Kelly | Harold |
| The Fortitude | 2018 - 2020 | Nick Adamson, Simon Fazey, Rob Sladden, Deep Lidder, Liz Gutterbock, Jenny Donoghue, Kathryn Higgins, Victoria Beardwood | Harold |
| Long Weekend | 2018 - 2020 | Jay Bennett, Nick Elleray, Doug Crossley, Will Rowland, Liz Elms, Anna Carden, Dan Subin, Olivia Florence | Harold |
| Super Discount Party Store | 2017 - 2021 | Amy Annette, Clemence Billoud, Victoria Barry, Mathew Gundel, Ruairi McInerney, Nick Brown, Simon Feilder, Sasha Brown | Harold |
| Night Bus | 2018 - 2019 | Freddie Sandilands, Lorna Shaw, Alex Morris, Shivani Thussu, Scott Oswald, Flora Anderson, Nicholas Everritt, Bryony Byrne | Harold |
| Feast | 2017 - 2019 | Amanda Stauffer, Becci Ride, Kat Bond, Max Dickins, Matthew Cosgrove, Patrick Dishman, Sophie Dickson, Theo McCabe | Harold |
| My Brother José | 2016 - 2018 | Lorna Shaw, Scott Oswald, Tamar Broadbent, Alex Morris, Clare Couchman, Nick Everritt, Kerry Gilbert, Steve Violich | Harold |
| The 838 | 2016 - 2018 | Tom Levinge, Simon Lukacs, Freddie Sandilands, Ivan Gonzalez, Shivani Thussu, Clare Plested, Alison Thea-Skot, Nathalie Antonia | Harold |

=== El Clasico ===
| Team Name | Cast Members |
|---|---|
| The Wilsons | Sophia Broido, Chris Gau, Shamus Maxwell, Mariam Haque, Katharine Bennett-Fox, Ian T Day, Shaun Lowthian, Jonathan Broke |
| The Cartel | Alex Holland, Amanda Farley, Freya Slipper, Jez Scharf, Lola-Rose Maxwell, David Elms, Charlie Kemp, Kayleigh Llewellyn |
| Sweet FA | Graham Dickson, Michael Orton-Toliver, Katia Kvinge, Briony Redman, Naomi Petersen, Liz Kingsman, Jim Archer, Rhys Collier |

=== Jacuzii Teams ===
| Activity | Cast Members |
|---|---|
| 2024 | Eni Oshowo, Gareth O'Connor, Chloe Godman, Flora Anderson, Josh Tyas, Lucy Gape, Rhys Collier, Ruairi McInerney, Mariam Haque, Katharine Bennett-Fox, David Martinez, Tracy Rakira |
| 2015-2024 | Rolling ensemble formed of Harold team performers |

=== Retired Headline Shows / Teams ===
| Team Name | Activity | Cast Members | Performance |
|---|---|---|---|
| A Scriptmas Miracle | 2025 | Cast: Sam Roulston, Katharine Bennett-Fox, Eleanor Hindson, Paul G. Raymond, George Collecott, Mariam Haque Guest Writers: Lara Ricote, Tom Levinge, David Elms, Ben Mallaby, Erika Ehler, Joe Barnes | Partially scripted improv format |
| Tragedy Plus Time | 2022 - 2024 | Cast: Simon Lukacs, Sally Hodgkiss, Sumina Kasuji, Doug Crossley, Caroline Amer, Flora Anderson, Freddie Sandilands, Ruairi McInerney Guests: Kiell Smith-Bynoe, Brendan Hunt, Marcus Brigstocke, Rufus Hound, Phil Wang, Freya Parker, Ken Cheng, Ambika Mod, Lara Ricote, Chelsea Gill, Amy Annette, Jack Barry, Lola-Rose Maxwell, Graham Dickson, Naomi Petersen, Lorna Shaw, Alison Thea-Skot, Chris Gau, Mariam Haque, Megan McCarthy, Ishan Ganjoor, Freya Slipper | Armando format created by Simon Lukacs |
| Taco Cat | 2019 - 2024 | Matthew Gundel, Clemence Billoud, Sasha Brown, Nick Brown, Amy Annette, Ruairi McInerney, Vic Barry, Freddie Sandilands, Shivani Thussu, Lorna Shaw, Alex Morris, Nick Everett, Bryony Byrne, Flora Anderson, Scott Oswald, Sam Roulston, Robert Gilbert, Jen Tyler, Britt Pay, Kiran Benawra | Palindrome format created by cast members of Super Discount Party Store and Night Bus |
| Winner | 2023 | Greg Baxter, Katharine Bennett-Fox, Alex Berr, Michelle Fahrenheim, Sumina Kasuji, Shaun Lowthian, Sam Roulston, Anand Sankar, Charlie Sturgeon | Sports Biopic Narrative Format created by Shaun Lowthian |
| Episodes | 2022 - 2023 | Lola-Rose Maxwell, Jono Selvadurai, Tamar Broadbent, Doug Crossley, Charlie Kemp, Shaun Lowthian, Scott Oswald, Laura Riseborough, Patrick Dishman | TV show narrative format created by Charlie Kemp |
| Sliding Lives | 2022 | Hosts: Laura Riseborough, Tara Bolland Cast: Tara Bolland, Luke Healy, Alex Holland, Jonathan Broke, George Collecott, Eni Oshowo, Shivani Thussu, Helen Duff, Flora Anderson, Naomi Petersen Guests: Ken Cheng, Kayleigh Llewellyn, Andrew Hunter Murray, Mae Martin, Oliver Chris, Rose Matafeo, Margaret Cabourn-Smith, Jack Barry, Fran Bushe, Miranda Keeling, Amelia Dimoldenberg, Mobeen Azhar, Clive Anderson | Talk show inspired Narrative format created by Tara Boland |
| Starry Starry Eyes | 2020 - 2023 | Hosts: Jonathan Broke, Freddie Sadilands Music: Dylan Townley Cast: Naomi Petersen, Alex Morris, Liz Gutterbock, Jay Bennett, Jonathan Broke, Emma Pritchard, Gareth O'Connor, Tamar Broadbent, Freddie Sadilands, Amy Annette, Joe Leather | Talent Show format created by Ryan Dench and Naomi Petersen |
| Minority Report | 2019 - 2023 | Ishan Ganjoor, Bruce Tang, Eni Oshowo, Jono Selvadurai, Alice Varma, Kiran Benawra, Hana White, Amille Jampa-Ngoen, Anis Qizilbash, Aram Balakjian, Nadège Nguyen, Evelyn Mok, Dev Donovan, Ambika Mod, Sumina Kasuji, Li Sa, Jeff Khan | Team composed of players from ethnic minority backgrounds |
| I'm Not Here To Make Friends | 2019 - 2022 | Charlie Kemp, Alison Thea-Skot, Jack Barry, Ruairi McInerney, Ambika Mod, Lorna Shaw, Doug Crossley, Naomi Petersen, Jenny Donoghue, Scott Oswald, Graham Dickson, Lucy Gape | Narrative format created by Jenny Donoghue |
| The Nearly News Show | 2019 - 2022 | Dominic Ashton, Mariam Haque, Alex Holland. Lola-Rose Maxwell, Max Dickins, Jonathan Broke. Florence Mercer, Nick Adamson, Naomi Petersen, Laura Riseborough | Original format created by Jonny Collis |
| The Present Company | 2019 - 2021 | Olivia Awuor, Katie Davison, Chloe Godman, Liz Guterbock, Ben Hadley, Lora Hristova, Jed Kass, Kaarina Kendall, Deep Lidder, Jack Morris, Jess Napier, Ben Nolan, Gareth O'Connor, Chris Ryan, Rob Sladden, Laurie Stevens, Felix Trench, Hana White | Conservatory show performing range of formats |
| The Badge | 2019 - 2020 | Graham Dickson, Ian Thomas Day, Naomi Petersen, Alison Thea Skot, Victoria Barry, Nick Everritt, Nick Adamson, Chris Gau, Shaun Lowthian, Freya Slipper | Narrative show created by Ian T Day, Chris Gau & Shaun Lowthian |

== Cage Match ==
2025 Winner: Scamps
| Heat 1 | Stella | Cold Cuts (WINNER) | The Dish |
| Heat 2 | Scamps (WINNER) | Heatwave | NANA |
| Heat 3 | TBC (WINNER) | Plinky Plonk | Max & Naomi are Married |
| Heat 4 | Happy Clappers (WINNER) | Summer Camp | Fluff |
| Semi Finals 1 | | Cold Cuts | Scamps (WINNER) |
| Semi Finals 2 | | TBC | Happy Clappers (WINNER) |
| Finals | | Happy Clappers | Scamps (WINNER) |
2024 Winner: The Ensemble
| Heat 1 | Michelle | NANA | Karlie & Tom (WINNER) |
| Heat 2 | The Gatekeepers | The Ensemble (WINNER) | Good Job |
| Heat 3 | LooProv (WINNER) | Birthstone | Summer Camp |
| Heat 4 | Hoof | Plinky Plonk (WINNER) | Love Factually |
| Semi Finals 1 | | Karlie & Tom (WINNER) | Plinky Plonk |
| Semi Finals 2 | | LooProv | The Ensemble (WINNER) |
| Finals | | Karlie & Tom | The Ensemble (WINNER) |
2023 Winner: Groundhog
| Heat 1 | Groundhog (WINNER) | Minority Report | Party Barge |
| Heat 2 | The Homunculus (WINNER) | The Grimbles | Noises From the Attic |
| Heat 3 | The Expendables | The Gatekeepers (WINNER) | Slumber Party |
| Heat 4 | Taco Cat (WINNER) | Film Club | Lauda |
| Semi Finals 1 | | Groundhog (WINNER) | The Homunculus |
| Semi Finals 2 | | The Gatekeepers (WINNER) | Taco Cat |
| Finals | | The Gatekeepers | Groundhog (WINNER) |

== Other shows ==
The theatre also hosts ensemble shows performed by players from the House Teams. These include Jacuzii, The Ladies of FA County and Uncle Glen's Menagerie. Previous guest residencies included other London-based acts Do Not Adjust Your Stage, The Petting Zoo and Sorry. Jacuzii was performed at The Pleasance at the Edinburgh Festival Fringe from 2015 to 2018.

The Free Association performed a live version of Drunk History (UK TV series) at Comedy Central LIVE, a three-day festival at Southampton’s Hoglands Park on 2018, with special guests Joel Dommett, Nish Kumar and Iain Stirling.

== Guest monologists ==
Mirroring established improv formats such as the Upright Citizens Brigade's ASSSSCAT, The Free Association's headline show Jacuzii, and other 'special guest' shows, welcome a guest monologist, whose truthful monologue provides the inspiration for a series of scenes. Previous guest monologists and performers include: Ralf Little, Nish Kumar, Oliver Chris, Tom Rosenthal, Phil Wang, Rachel Parris, Cariad Lloyd, Mae Martin, Steen Raskopoulos, Brett Goldstein, Rose Matafeo, Sindhu Vee, Matt Jones, Kirby Howell-Baptiste, Neil Casey and Jason Mantzoukas.

== Training programmes ==
The FA performer training programme takes place over 6 levels and focuses on learning "The Harold", a form created by Del Close. The Free Association also provides improvisation training for businesses, focusing on communication and collaboration. In 2025, The Times reported on the company’s corporate training, highlighting workshops for South Western Railway apprentices that used improvisation techniques to build confidence, teamwork, and communication skills.

== Additional work ==
The Free Association's Michael Orton-Toliver and Chris Gau created the part-improvised "retro-scripted" comedy mockumentary Borderline for Channel 5 in 2016. The show features a number of Free Association-trained performers and was directed by Breaking Bad's Matt Jones.

Performers Ian Thomas Day, Chris Gau and Shaun Lowthian created the improvised character comedy podcast Fact Up in 2015. Now running to over 150 episodes, the podcast featured on BBC Radio 4 Extra's Podcast Radio Hour in 2018, chosen by comedian Cariad Lloyd.

Performer Freya Slipper created and wrote Audible musical Crush Hour in 2022, with additional material by fellow performer Doug Crossley.

== Awards and recognition ==
Kayleigh Llewellyn created In My Skin, winning Best Television Drama at the 2019 BAFTA Cymru Awards, and Best Television Drama and Best Writer at the 2022 British Academy Television Awards. She was also named as one of BAFTA's Breakthrough Brits in 2019.

Performer Jim Archer directed feature film Brian and Charles in 2022, receiving a nomination for the BAFTA Award for Outstanding British Film.

Performer Ambika Mod appeared in a leading role in HBO and BBC TV series This Is Going To Hurt in 2022, and Netflix series One Day in 2023.

Performer Liz Kingsman was nominated for Best Entertainment or Comedy Play at the 2023 Laurence Olivier Awards for her show One Woman Show at Soho Theatre. The show was also nominated for the Edinburgh Comedy Award in 2022.

Performer Haley McGee was nominated for Outstanding Achievement in an Affiliate Theatre at the 2023 Laurence Olivier Awards for Age Is A Feeling at Soho Theatre. Performer and writer Waleed Akhtar won in the same category for The P Word at Bush Theatre.

Performer Shaun Lowthian was nominated for Best Online Comedy at the Writers' Guild of Great Britain Awards in 2019, for short-film Spokke.

In 2021, The Guardian featured The Free Association's improv classes in a range of articles on activities to get out of your comfort zone.
