= Stevyn Colgan =

British writer, artist and speaker

- Stevyn Colgan at a promotional pub quiz, Phoenix Theatre, London August 2008
- Born: Stephen Mark Colgan; 11 August 1961 (age 64) London, England
- Occupation: Writer, Artist, Speaker, Folklorist
- Genre: Non-Fiction, Humorous Fiction, Illustration

Website
- www.youtube.com/@Colganology/videos/

Stevyn Colgan (born 11 August 1961) is a British writer, artist and speaker.

Colgan was a police officer in London 1980–2010. He was then a researcher and scriptwriter for the BBC TV series QI and the regular QI Annuals, and for QI's BBC Radio 4 sister show The Museum of Curiosity until 2018. He co-presents the We'd Like A Word books and authors podcast.

He is interested in British folklore and folk culture.

He was declared 'Greatest British Eccentric 2025' by the Eccentric Club of Great Britain.

== Career ==
=== Police ===
Colgan joined the Metropolitan Police Force in 1980. He was awarded the Police Long Service and Good Conduct Medal in 1993 and the Queen's Golden Jubilee Medal in 2003. He retired from the police in February 2010 after completing 30 years' service.

In later service, Colgan was a member of the award-winning Met Police Problem Solving Unit that used behavioural economics and creative thinking to tackle issues that did not respond to traditional policing/enforcement methods. He sat on several Home Office working groups and is an expert on problem-oriented policing. He worked closely with the UK Home Office and the UCL Jill Dando Institute of Crime Science. He has lectured and taught extensively throughout the UK and US and elsewhere and now lectures in a private capacity and at Buckinghamshire New University.

He was a judge for the 2013 Transmission Awards for Innovative Thinking.

=== Artist ===
Colgan's first published illustration work was for the book I Remember: Reflections on Fishing and Childhood (Summersdale 1995) by Joe Cowley, Frederick Forsyth, Roger Daltrey, Bernard Cribbins, George Melly and others. The book raised money for the NSPCC. In 2006 he was the official artist for the Autumn National Children's Book Fair organised by Scholastic Books Ltd.

He illustrated several features for the various QI Annuals and the cover for the 'E, F, G' Compilation Annual in November 2010. His artwork regularly appears on the QI TV series. The QI 'H' Annual 2011 features a two-page spread co-written by himself, Justin Pollard and John Lloyd, called HENJ in which IKEA-style instructions for building Stonehenge are seen. These pages became so popular that they can be found on hundreds of websites and have spawned/inspired many other similar illustrations.

In 2011, Colgan was invited to participate in the annual Royal College of Art Secret Auction alongside such notables as Yoko Ono, Tracey Emin, Nick Park and Grayson Perry. He continues to do so every year.

During the 2020 Covid lockdown he created a public arts project called 'The Monster Zoo' that allowed children to create monsters from household junk and display them in a farm field while socially distancing. The Monster Zoo was featured on the Channel 4 television series Grayson's Art Club (Series 2 Episode 2) alongside works by Banksy and Andy Goldsworthy. Some of the monsters then featured in an exhibition hosted by Grayson Perry at Bristol Museum & Art Gallery and in the book of the series.

=== Writer ===
In October 2008, his first book, Joined-Up Thinking, was published by Pan Macmillan Books.

In 2010 the Cornish Language Fellowship (Kowethas an Yeth Kernewek) and the Cornish Language Board (Kesva an Taves Kernewek) published Henhwedhlow, a book of Cornish Faerie Stories written and illustrated by Colgan. The book was published in both English and Cornish language on facing pages to aid translation. The stories are modern interpretations of traditional folktales plus several brand new stories by the author. The book contains the largest existing body of modern Cornish prose.

In 2013 he launched a new book called Constable Colgan's Connectoscope with the crowd-funding publisher Unbound.

In 2014 and 2015 respectively, he self-published a novel – The Third Condiment – and an adult colouring book called Colgeroons on the Lulu platform.

In 2016 his semi-autobiographical book about problem-oriented policing Why Did The Policeman Cross The Road? was published by Unbound in association with Penguin Books. It tells the story of his tenure with the Problem Solving Unit and carries cover quotes from Stephen J Dubner and Rory Sutherland. Later retitled as One Step Ahead: Notes From The Problem Solving Unit for paperback release in 2018.

He co-wrote Saving Bletchley Park with Dr Sue Black, published in 2015.

His first novel, a comedy murder mystery novel called A Murder To Die For was published in January 2018. It was shortlisted for Penguin Books Dead Good Awards and longlisted for The Guardian Not The Booker Prize. His second novel The Diabolical Club was published in 2019 and his third, Cockerings, in 2021.

=== Media ===
In 2012 he co-wrote the pilot for a radio series called 101 People to Meet Before You (Or They) Die with Dan Schreiber. After broadcast, a live show followed featuring on-stage interviews with Marc Abrahams and Dr Jan Bondeson.

Also in 2012, he became one of the researcher/writers for BBC Radio 4's The Museum of Curiosity. He was part of the writing team that won the Rose D'or in 2016.

In May 2012 he appeared on an episode of the Do the Right Thing podcast in the 'Ask the Expert' round and on an episode of Dave Gorman's BBC2 series Genius.

He has appeared on many podcasts including Freakonomics, Level Up Human, Little Atoms and the online live panel show Ex Libris.

His artwork has been seen on episodes of the BBC TV series QI, and he was name-checked by Stephen Fry in the QIXL episode "Humans" in 2010. He made cameo appearances in the 2014 episode "Location, Location, Location" and the 2018 episode Occult.

In 2016 he made a guest appearance on the QI podcast No Such Thing as a Fish.

In 2025 he appeared on the 'We Can Be Weirdos' podcast hosted by Dan Schreiber.

Since March 2019 he has co-presented with Paul Waters the We'd Like A Word books and authors podcast.

His YouTube channel 'Colganology' clocked up over 3.5 million views in its first year.

=== Speaking ===
In recent years he has been a visiting lecturer in metacognition at Barts and the London. He has also spoken at Imperial College, Central St Martin's College of Art, York University, Brasenose College, Oxford, University of Exeter, the Institution of Engineering and Technology (IET) and many other academic institutions.

He is currently a lecturer in criminal and forensic psychology at Buckinghamshire New University.

He has also taught art and lectured on creative thinking and problem solving.

His talks are a mix of science, art, folklore, autobiography and comedy. He has performed at venues and events such as TEDx, Glasgow Science Festival, Agile Cymru, Google Huddle, Hybrid Conf Berlin, the Ig Nobel Prizes, QED_(conference), Aegis Kuala Lumpur and has performed many Skeptics in the Pub and Science Showoff shows. He has also appeared at the Hay Festival, Latitude, Harrogate International Festival, Salon London and many more.

He also appeared alongside Hannah Gadsby, Eric Lampaert and Alex Edelman performing stand up at the Edinburgh Festival for a show called John Lloyd's Curious Edinburgh, hosted by Lloyd and Dan Schreiber.

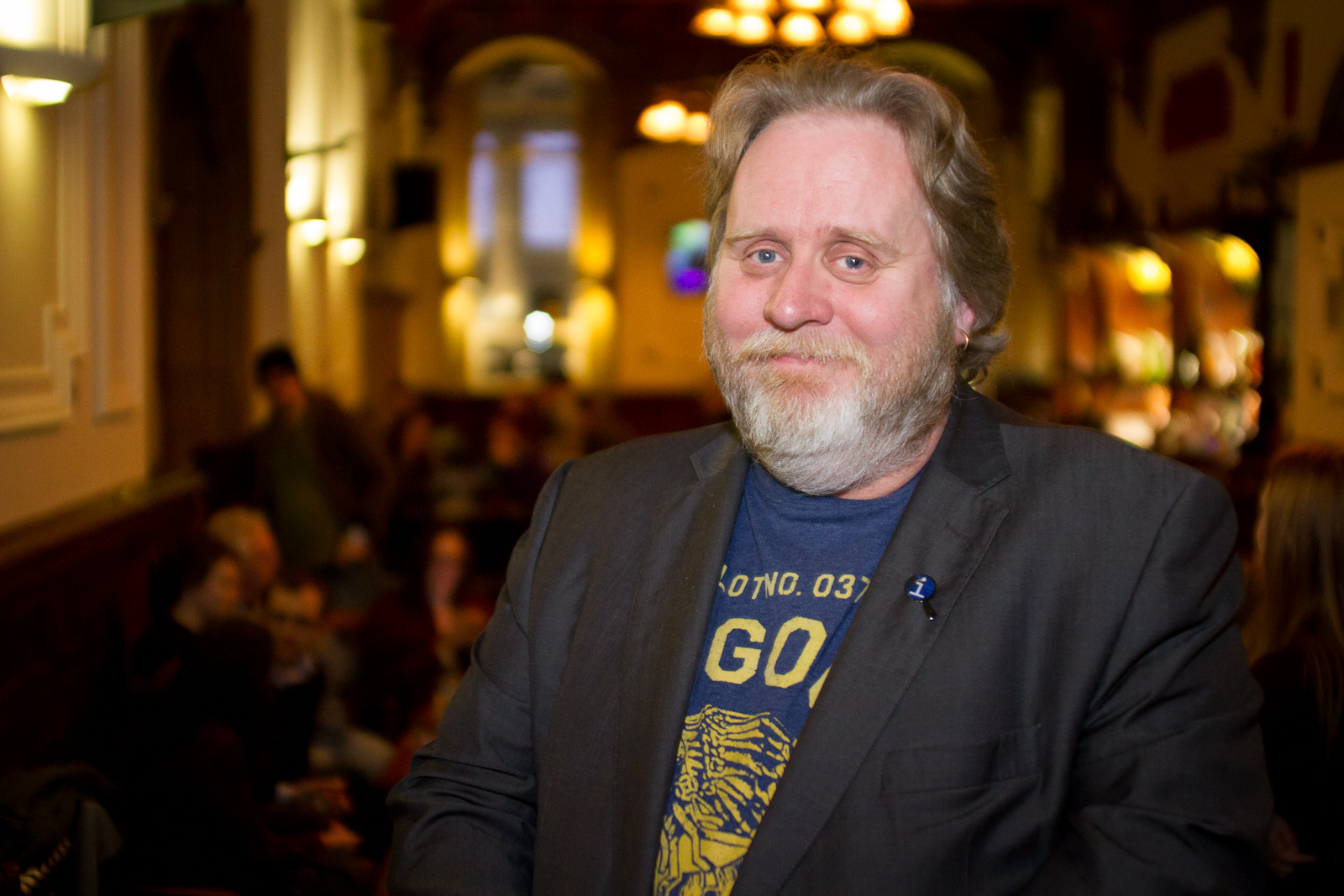
Stevyn Colgan at the Merseyside Skeptics Society

== Bibliography ==
- Joined-Up Thinking (2008)
- Henhwedhlow: The Clotted Cream of Cornish Folktales (2010)
- Constable Colgan's Connectoscope (2012)
- The Third Condiment (2014)
- Colgeroons (2015)
- Saving Bletchley Park (with Dr Sue Black OBE) (2015)
- Why Did The Policeman Cross The Road? (2016)
- A Murder to Die For (2018)
- The Diabolical Club (2019)
- Cockerings (2021)
