= Graham Dickson =

British improv comedian

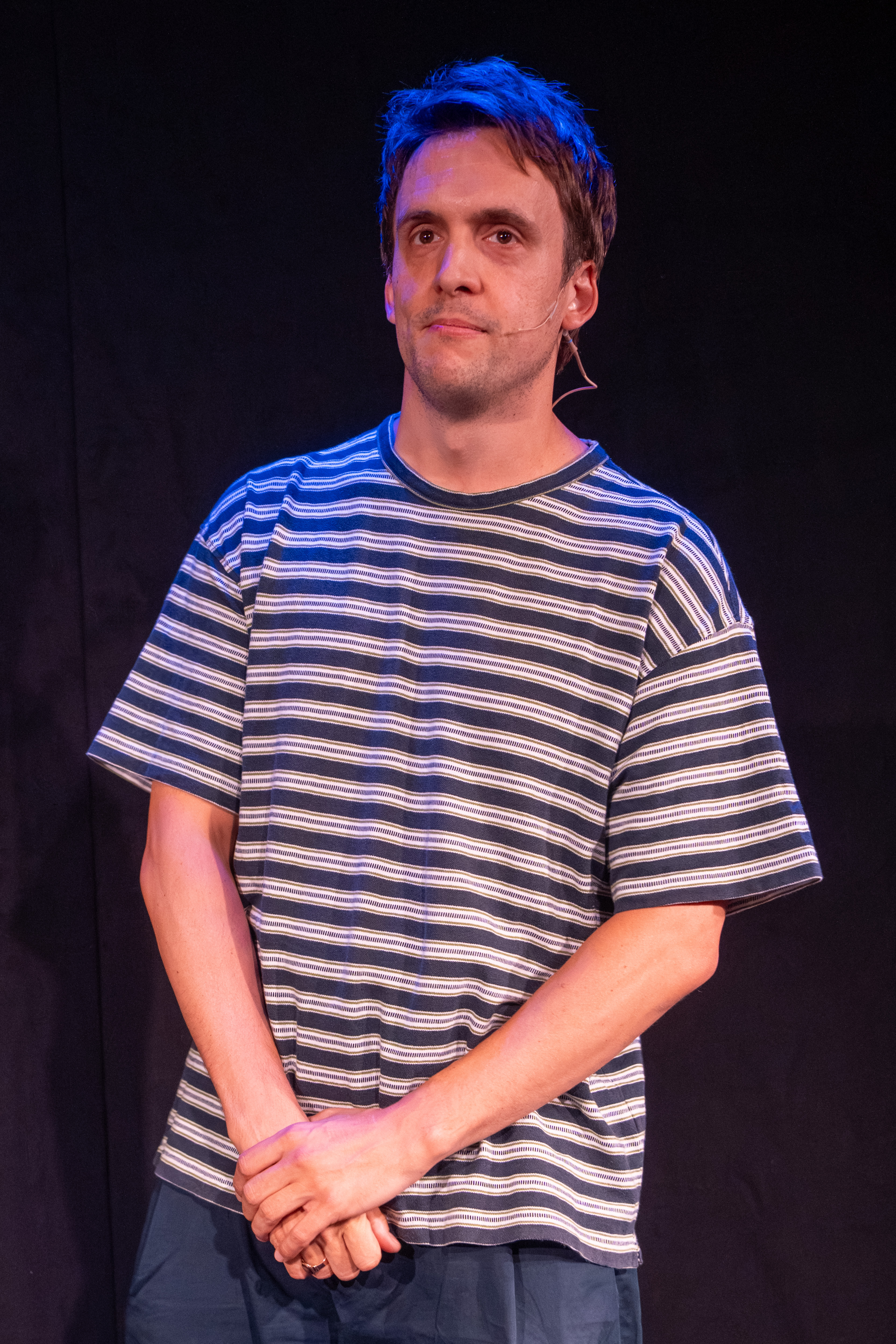
- Dickson in 2025
- Born: 1985 or 1986 (age 39–40); Leeds, Yorkshire, England
- Education: Upright Citizens Brigade
- Notable work: Austentatious

Comedy career
- Years active: 2011–present

Graham Dickson (born 1985 or 1986) is an English writer, actor and comedian. He is a founding member of Austentatious as well as co-founder and creative director of the improvised comedy theatre The Free Association (or The FA) in London.

== Early life ==
Dickson was born in Leeds and moved to Hertfordshire when he was five years old. He trained at New York Film Academy, Upright Citizens Brigade, and East 15.

Dickson has cited an early love of The Simpsons as "by far the biggest comedic influence of my life".

== Career ==
Dickson is a founding member of the Jane Austen-themed improvisational comedy troupe Austentatious, performing regularly with the group since 2011. In 2014, the show won the Chortle Award for Best Character, Improv or Sketch Act.

Dickinson noted the lack of a UK improv training school and theatres to match U.S. institutions such as UCB, IO and The Second City, and was inspired to found The Free Association in 2014 alongside comedy duo Max & Ivan. After starting out as an improv troupe, the group began hosting classes and shows at the De Beauvoir Arms in Haggerston and the Lord Stanley in Camden. In October 2025, a new purpose-built venue was opened in the Old Union Yard Arches in Southwark. Dickson is currently Creative Director of The FA.

At Edinburgh Fringe Festival 2017, Dickson performed his show Graham Dickson is The Narcissist. The show featured commentary by director Hamish MacDougall live from the tech box. The following year, he performed Timber at the festival, a show which explored themes of the MeToo movement.

In 2018, Dickson co-wrote and starred in the short film Down From London with Liz Kingsman which was later expanded into a web miniseries. For his work on the series, Dickson received a nomination for Best Online Comedy at the Writers' Guild of Great Britain Awards 2020.

Dickson appeared in supporting roles in After Life in 2019, PLS Like in 2021, and Witchfinder in 2022.

Dickson played the "posh cokehead" Archie in the 2021 comedy horror film All My Friends Hate Me. His performance was described by one critic as "outstanding".

With a cast of improvisers from The Free Association, Dickson created and directed St Doctor’s Hospital, a show inspired by medical dramas. After debuting in The FA's venue at the time (upstairs at De Beauvoir Arms) it ran at the VAULT Festival and Edinburgh Fringe Festival 2023. It since runs as monthly residency at the new permanent venue of The FA.

In 2024, Dickson starred in the dark comedy film King Baby, which premiered at International Film Festival Rotterdam. He also brought his latest solo show No One Deserves This More Than You to Edinburgh Fringe Festival in 2024. This show explored the frustrations of the acting industry and involved the audience reading parts in fictional self-tape scenarios.

Dickson performs regularly as an ensemble actor in the improv show Kool Story Bro, hosted by Kiell Smith-Bynoe. Together with Steen Raskopoulos, he also performs in Graham and Steen, which was part of Edinburgh Fringe Festival in 2025 and 2026.
