= Anna Ptaszynski =

British podcaster

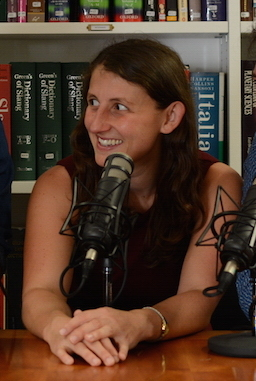
- Born: 16 May 1986 (age 39)
- Occupations: Podcaster; host; writer
- Relatives: André Ptaszynski (father)

Anna Rosemary Ptaszynski (born 16 May 1986) is a British podcaster, television host and television writer. She is one of the four regular hosts of the podcast No Such Thing as a Fish alongside Dan Schreiber, Andrew Hunter Murray and James Harkin. She was also a presenter of the BBC Two television show No Such Thing as the News and is a researcher and writer for the television show QI.

== Early life ==
Ptaszynski was born on 16 May 1986, the daughter of Judith Terry and theatre producer André Ptaszynski (1953–2020). Her paternal grandfather, Władysław Ptaszynski, was a Polish officer who spent time in a prisoner of war camp in Russia. She has three younger siblings and attended Oxford High School. Before working at QI and No Such Thing as a Fish, she worked in Scottish politics and in advertising.

== Career ==
Ptaszynski is a researcher, writer, and script-editor for the BBC quiz show QI.

Ptaszynski has been one of the four regular hosts of the podcast No Such Thing as a Fish since it was launched as a spinoff of the BBC quiz show QI in March 2014. Five years later, at the end of 2019, episodes of No Such Thing as a Fish had been downloaded over 250 million times, with 1.5 million listeners every week. Ptaszynski has gone on several national and international tours to record live episodes of No Such Thing as a Fish.

Ptaszynski was a co-author of three books published by the podcast's co-hosts: The Book of the Year 2019, The Book of the Year 2018, and The Book of the Year 2017. She also co-authored the book: Everything to play for, with co-host James Harkin. Along with the other main hosts of No Such Thing as a Fish, Ptaszynski hosted No Such Thing as the News, a BBC Two television program based on the podcast.

Facts shared by Ptaszynski on No Such Thing as a Fish have been cited in media outlets as the Daily Express, and she has published facts in The Telegraph. Ptaszynski has been noted for her dry humour on the podcast.

Ptaszynski was the curator for the 17th series of the Radio 4 show Museum of Curiosity, which she co-hosted with its creator John Lloyd.

Episode 467 of No Such Thing as a Fish, released in February 2023, was Ptaszynski's last episode of the podcast before her temporary departure for maternity leave. She returned for the 500th episode in October 2023. She permanently returned in episode 504.

In July 2024, Ptaszynski and fellow No Such Thing As a Fish host James Harkin released the first episode of their podcast Quite a Good Sport. The podcast is produced by QI.
