= My First Planet =

- Running time: 28 minutes
- Country of origin: United Kingdom
- Language: English
- Home station: BBC Radio 4 Extra
- Starring: Nicholas Lyndhurst; Vicki Pepperdine; Tom Goodman-Hill; Phil Whelans; John Dorney; Cariad Lloyd; Letty Butler
- Written by: Phil Whelans
- Produced by: David Tyler
- Original release: 12 April 2012
- No. of series: 2
- No. of episodes: 10

My First Planet is a British radio sitcom written by Phil Whelans. Set on a newly founded space colony, second-in-command Brian Palmer (Nicholas Lyndhurst) finds himself unexpectedly in charge when their intended leader dies and must work with the colonists to ensure their survival.

The series is produced by David Tyler for Pozzitive Television and broadcast on BBC Radio 4 Extra. The first series initially aired in 2012 and the second in 2014.

== Cast ==
- Brian Palmer (Nicholas Lyndhurst) is the Acting Commander of the colony on Planet XB1174, originally the Deputy Commander to Burrows until his death from old age after being locked out of suspended animation. His time as Commander has been marked by his management of an ongoing food crisis, energy crises and several sociological crises (which parodied contemporary news stories).
- Dr Lillian Pointer (Vicki Pepperdine) is the Chief Physician obsessed with the fulfilment of Project Adam, a plan to conceive the first human born on the new planet, even suggesting or going to unethical lengths to try to achieve it. Ruthlessly authoritarian, she usually (and unsuccessfully) demands that Brian be removed as Commander, subjects colonists to invasive medical examinations and attempts to inject colonists with sedatives to evade questioning for wrongdoing.
- Mason (Tom Goodman-Hill) is the Chief Scientist. Amoral, he shows a complete disregard for moral concerns, the feelings of others or the consequences of his actions. He was responsible for Burrows' death due to his design of the suspended animation system. In light of the food crisis, he is responsible for producing a synthetic protein to remedy this.
- Archer (Phil Whelans) is the colony's maintenance engineer but claims that he was selected for the colony as an empath (which the colonists treat with scepticism and is often disproven).
- Carol (Cariad Lloyd (series 1), Letty Butler (series 2)) is the Chief Botanist and originally part of Project Adam (which stalled due to her objections to having a child from a loveless relationship and being subject to invasive medical examination). In light of the food crisis, she is responsible for growing food via innovative means to remedy this.
- Richard (John Dorney) was Carol's boyfriend for three months prior to the mission (minus time spent in suspended animation) who played along with the lie that they were a couple for the chance to travel to space. Having been selected solely to serve as part of Project Adam, the stalling of the plan leaves him without responsibilities barring those as a member of the Colony Steering Committee. His attempts to find a role in the colony are often frustrated or lead to chaos, such as his self-appointment as editor of a newssheet which he eventually fills exclusively with provocative, manufactured stories.

== Episodes ==
=== Series 1 (2012) ===
No.	Title	Original release date
1	"The Landing Has Landed"	11 April 2012
Day 1 on the colony and the inhabitants have lost the food, the air, the Commander and the mood music. Meanwhile, Chief Physician Lillian makes a terrible discovery about Project Adam.
2	"Hairdresser from Space"	18 April 2012
Day 7 on the colony and Mason stirs up an ethical nightmare involving a hairdressing clone. Richard, meanwhile, tries to find a purpose in the colony.
3	"The Noticeboard of Doom"	25 April 2012
Day 9 and the colonists are torn between Richard's newsletter and Archer's hot pants.
4	"Inglorious Barters"	2 May 2012
Day 12. A queue for the loo and a rogue backrub threaten to blow up the colony. With guest star Richard Bond.

=== Series 2 (2014) ===
No. overall	No. in series	Title	Original release date
5	1	"Sample of Terror"	21 July 2014
Day 30 and Brian tries to save the contents of a freezer, while Mason tries to role-play in the nuclear core.
6	2	"One Small Naughty Step For Man"	28 July 2014
Day 32. The colony teacher shuts Carol and Richard in a room with some alcohol, Lillian attempts to cure the common cold and Mason invents a personal environment suit.
7	3	"They Came to Test Our Brains"	4 August 2014
Day 40. A pub quiz and a talking yam, who seems to be smarter than he, spells disaster for Brian when he discovers his I.Q.
8	4	"Adjective From Space!"	11 August 2014
Day 43. Lillian experiments with mind control and an election is called. Richard goes for the youth vote by talking nonsense while Brian's campaign is based on some nauseating protein.
9	5	"Let Me Entertain Me"	18 August 2014
Day 46. The colony is suffering from a lack of art and CCTV is the new entertainment. Despite the discovery of a poet, Archer gains popularity by scripting events, including a monster, a sword fight and a bomb.
10	6	"Day Trip to Terror!"	25 August 2014
Day 49. What better time for social media to kick in than on a dangerous mission on the surface?

== Reception ==
The first series received coverage as 'Pick of the Day' in The Times, The Daily Telegraph and The Independent, with The Daily Telegraph's Gillian Reynolds commenting: "What makes it funny is that its characters are (and remain) all too recognisably human".
