= Joined-Up Thinking =

2008 book by Stevyn Colgan

- UK cover
- Author: Stevyn Colgan
- Illustrator: Kate Forrester
- Language: English
- Subject: Trivia
- Publisher: Macmillan
- Publication date: 3 October 2008
- Publication place: United Kingdom
- Media type: Print (Hardback)
- Pages: 249 pp
- ISBN: 978-0-230-71220-1

Joined-Up Thinking is the first book by writer and artist Stevyn Colgan. It is based loosely upon the idea of Six Degrees of Separation first put forward by Frigyes Karinthy and later explored by Stanley Milgram and Richard Wiseman, in that everything and everyone in the world can be connected in some way. The book takes a light-hearted and humorous series of 'cyclic journeys through the land of trivia'. What marks the book as different from previous books of trivia is that each chapter or 'Round' takes the reader along a chain of interconnected facts ending, ultimately, back at the first fact in the chain. There are 30 of these 'journeys' in the book which are then all linked together in 'The Great Big Joined-Up Index' where Colgan shows the interconnectedness between facts in different Rounds.

== Publication history ==
First published by Macmillan in Britain on 3 October 2008. The book received favourable comments from both Stephen Fry and John Mitchinson of Quite Interesting Ltd, co-author (with John Lloyd) of The Book of General Ignorance.

"I found myself strangely fascinated and somewhat dizzy. Most impressive" - Stephen Fry.

"The book that nails that odd, slightly unnerving feeling that everything really is connected" - John Mitchinson.

The paperback edition was released on 18 September 2009.

== Critical reception ==
Response to the book has been positive to date.

'This is not a stocking filler - this is a real book. Buy several copies and keep one' - Daily Telegraph

'He connects each piece of his trivia puzzle in a concise, chatty, easy to follow, even logical, manner. This free-flowing style does not, thankfully, lend itself to pause and evaluation, but does allow for a great deal of chuckling and chin-stroking. This is the sort of book that you will read and then spend the next month or so scratching your head and wondering just how it is, exactly, you know that avocados are poisonous, that indigo is really just a shade of violet, or that Wilma Flintstone had two maiden names, Pebble or Slaghoople, depending on which episode you watched, or that former British Prime Minister Tony Blair owns a telephone that resembles a Harley-Davidson. He is the master of the trivial, the collector and cataloguer of the forgotten and inane - but no matter how worthless and unnecessary the information, Colgan has the knack of making it all sound intensely fascinating' - New Zealand Herald
