= John Dorney =

British writer and actor

John Dorney is a British writer and actor best known for stage roles at theatres including the National Theatre, the BBC Radio 4 sitcom My First Planet; and his scripts for the Big Finish Doctor Who range. His script Solitaire was rated the most popular Doctor Who Companion Chronicle of 2010 on the Timescales website and was the runner up in Unreality Sci-fi net's poll for Story of the Year 2010–11. His script Iterations of I won the Scribe Award for best spin-off audio drama of 2014 and his script “The Red Lady” won the same award in 2015. His script “Absent Friends” won a BBC Audio Drama award, and the co-authored script for ‘Stranded 1’ won an Audie.

As well as Doctor Who, he has written for Big Finish's Sapphire and Steel series and on radio co-wrote three series of BBC Radio 4's Recorded for Training Purposes. He won the BBC Show Me the Funny 'Sketch Factor' competition, was a finalist in the BBC 'Laughing Stock' competition, and has performed in Mark Watson's Edinburgh Comedy Award-winning long shows as 'The Balladeer'. On stage, he has written plays for the Royal Court Theatre, Hampstead and Soho Theatres.

He trained at LAMDA.

== Writing credits ==
Production	Company/Broadcaster	Notes/Dates
Doctor Who: Monsters in Metropolis	Big Finish Productions	Writer, November 2021
Doctor Who: Dalek Universe	Big Finish Productions	Writer (Three Episodes) Script Editor, 2021
Donna Noble Kidnapped: Spinvasion	Big Finish Productions	Writer, March 2020
Recorded for Training Purposes	BBC Radio 4	Co-writer, three series
Missy: Divorced, Beheaded, Regenerated	Big Finish Productions	Writer, February, 2019
Torchwood: See No Evil	Big Finish Productions	Writer, October 2018
Doctor Who: Ravenous	Big Finish Productions	Writer (Eight Episodes) 2018 - 2019
The Diary of River Song: Five Twenty Nine	Big Finish Productions	Writer, Jan 2017
Doctor Who: Infamy of the Zaross	Big Finish Productions	Writer 2017
Doctor Who: Original Sin	Big Finish Productions	Writer (based on the novel by Andy Lane), December 2016
The New Counter-Measures: Who Killed Toby Kinsella?	Big Finish Productions	Writer, July 2016
Doctor Who: The Trouble with Drax	Big Finish Productions	Writer, June 2016
Doctor Who: The Two Masters	Big Finish Productions	Writer, June 2016
Doctor Who: Doom Coalition 2: Scenes from Her Life	Big Finish Productions	Writer, March 2016
Doctor Who: Infernal Devices: Legion of the Lost	Big Finish Productions	Writer, February 2016
Doctor Who: You Are the Doctor and Other Stories	Big Finish Productions	Co-Writer, December 2015
Doctor Who: Doom Coalition: The Red Lady	Big Finish Productions	Writer, October 2015
Doctor Who: Waiting for Gadot	Big Finish Productions	Writer, September 2015
Doctor Who: Terror of the Sontarans	Big Finish Productions	Writer (with Dan Starkey), September 2015
Counter-Measures: Rise and Shine	Big Finish Productions	Writer, July 2015
Doctor Who: The Well-Mannered War	Big Finish Productions	Writer (based on the novel by Gareth Roberts), April 2015
Doctor Who: Requiem for the Rocket Men	Big Finish Productions	Writer, March 2015
Doctor Who: Dark Eyes 4	Big Finish Productions	Writer (with Matt Fitton), March 2015
Doctor Who: The English Way of Death	Big Finish Productions	Writer (based on the novel by Gareth Roberts), Jan 2015
Doctor Who: Iterations of I	Big Finish Productions	Writer, August 2014
Counter-Measures: Unto the Breach	Big Finish Productions	Writer, July 2014
Doctor Who: Second Chances	Big Finish Productions	Writer, June 2014
Doctor Who: The Crooked Man	Big Finish Productions	Writer, March 2014
Doctor Who: The King of Sontar	Big Finish Productions	Writer, Jan 2014
Doctor Who: 1963: The Assassination Games	Big Finish Productions	Writer, November 2013
Doctor Who: The Lost Stories – Lords of the Red Planet	Big Finish Productions	Writer (based on the outline by Brian Hayles), November 2013
Counter-Measures: Sins of the Fathers	Big Finish Productions	Writer, July 2013
Doctor Who: The Justice of Jalxar	Big Finish Productions	Writer, March 2013
Doctor Who: The Burning Prince	Big Finish Productions	Writer, September 2012
Jago and Litefoot: Beautiful Things	Big Finish Productions	Writer, March 2012
Doctor Who: The Wrath of the Iceni	Big Finish Productions	Writer, March 2012
Doctor Who: The Fourth Wall	Big Finish Productions	Writer, February 2012
Doctor Who: The Lost Stories – The Foe from the Future	Big Finish Productions	Writer (based on the outline by Robert Banks Stewart), January 2012
Doctor Who: The Lost Stories – The Elite	Big Finish Productions	Writer (based on the outline by Barbara Clegg), October 2011
Doctor Who: The Rocket Men	Big Finish Productions	Writer, August 2011
Jago and Litefoot: Swan Song	Big Finish Productions	Writer, June 2011
Doctor Who: The Lost Stories – The Destroyers	Big Finish Productions	Based on a script for an unproduced pilot by Terry Nation, co-adapted with Nicholas Briggs, December 2010
Bernice Summerfield: Present Tense – The Propaganda War	Big Finish Productions	Writer 2010
Bernice Summerfield: Dead Man's Switch	Big Finish Productions	Writer with Richard Dinnick, December 2010
Doctor Who: The Demons of Red Lodge and Other Stories	Big Finish Productions	Co-writer, December 2010
Doctor Who: Echoes of Grey	Big Finish Productions	Writer, August 2010
Doctor Who: Solitaire	Big Finish Productions	Writer, June 2010
Sapphire and Steel: Remember Me	Big Finish Productions	Writer, 2008
Doctor Who: Lepidoptery for Beginners	Big Finish Productions	Writer, 2008
Cowboys	Royal Court Theatre	Writer, October 2000

== Acting credits (selected) ==
Production	Company/Broadcaster	Role	Notes/Dates
The Omega Factor	Big Finish Productions	Adam Dean	2015
Doctor Who: The Light at the End	Big Finish Productions	Bob Dovie	2013
My First Planet	BBC Radio 4	Richard	2012
Doctor Who: The Demons of Red Lodge and Other Stories	Big Finish Productions	Janson Hart	2010
Doctor Who: Farewell, Great Macedon	Big Finish Productions	Alexander the Great	2010
Doctor Who: The Fragile Yellow Arc of Fragrance	Big Finish Productions	Rhythm	2010
Doctor Who: A Death in the Family	Big Finish Productions	Henry Noone	2010
The Caretaker	London Classic Theatre	Mick	Touring 2010
Humble Boy	London Classic Theatre	Felix Humble	Touring 2008-2009
Peter Pan	National Theatre	Nibs	1998–1999
Flight	National Theatre	Cossack	1998
Something Beginning With...	Orange Tree	Harry	2000
Volpone	Wilton's Music Hall	Corvino	2005
Beauty and the Beast	Creation Theatre Company	The Beast	2009
Honolulu	Pleasance Courtyard	Milo	2004
Better Watch Out	Hampstead Theatre	Matt Cooper	2003
