= Up the Creek (comedy club) =

Comedy club in Greenwich, London, England

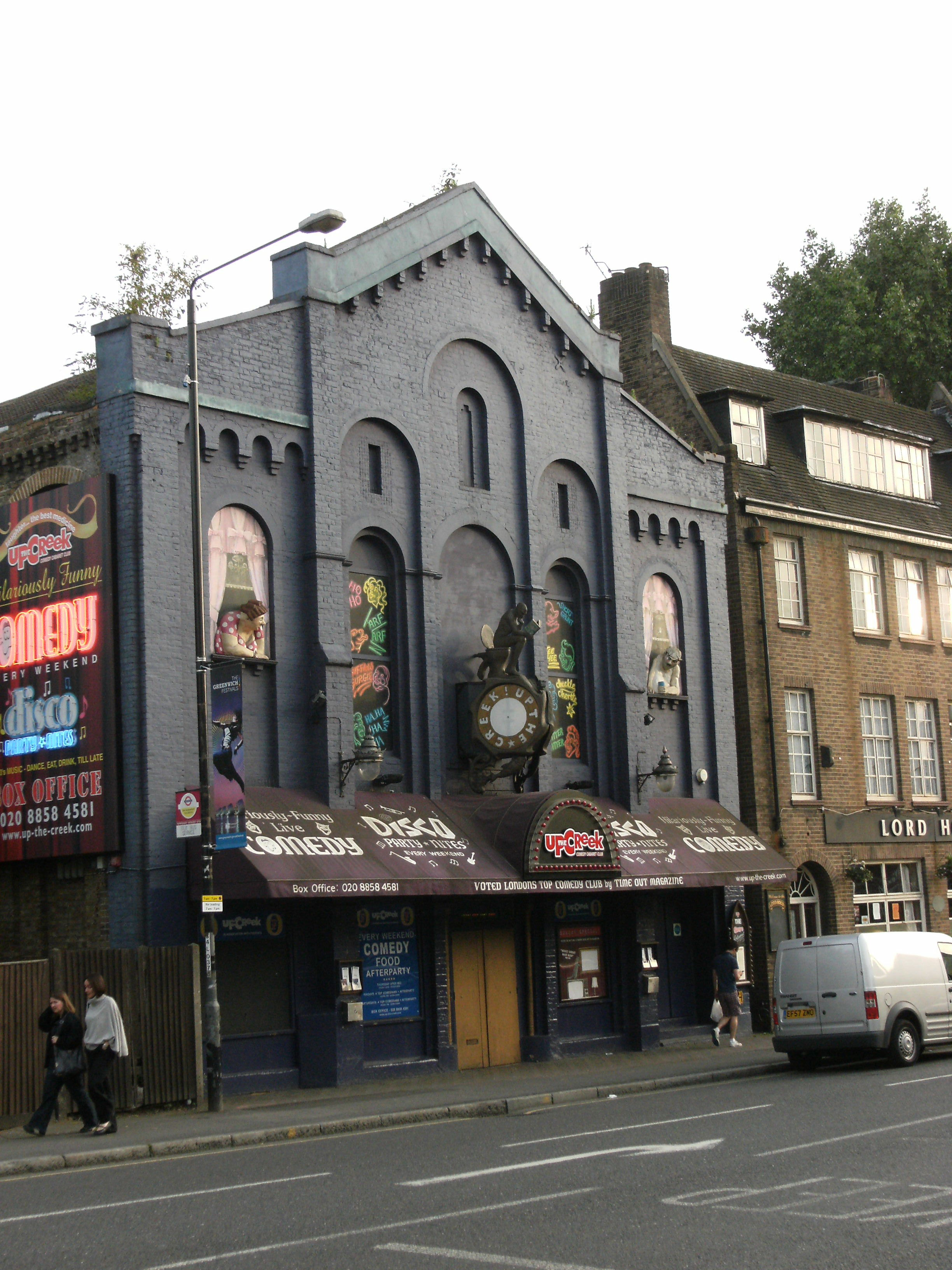
- Interactive map of Up the Creek
- Coordinates: 51.4813°N 0.0116°W
- Capacity: 275

Construction
- Opened: 1991

Website
- up-the-creek.com

Up the Creek is a comedy club on Creek Road in Greenwich, London.

The club was founded in 1991 by Malcolm Hardee, who was a regular master of ceremonies. In an upstairs bar at the club was a mural commissioned by Hardee as a parody of Leonardo da Vinci's The Last Supper, with Hardee as Christ and other comedians including Jo Brand and Julian Clary as the Twelve Apostles, with Ben Elton as Judas Iscariot.

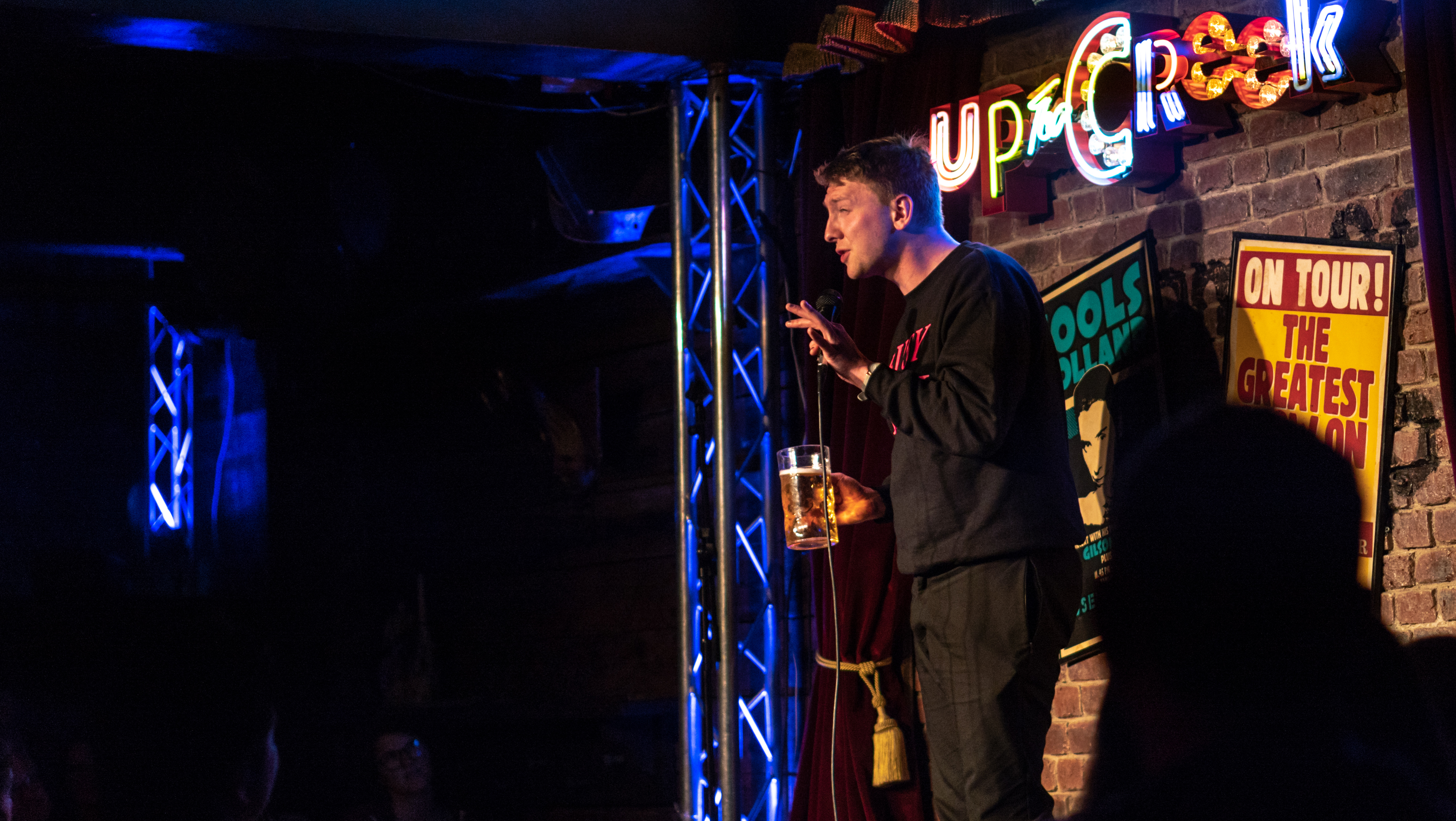
Joe Lycett performing at Up the Creek

The venue won the inaugural Chortle Award for Best Large Venue, in 2002. Comedians to have played Up the Creek include Phil Nicol, Andrew Maxwell, Sam Simmons, Tim Vine, Ricky Grover, Owen O'Neill and Boothby Graffoe. The television series No Such Thing as the News was filmed at the club.
