= Emperor Yes =

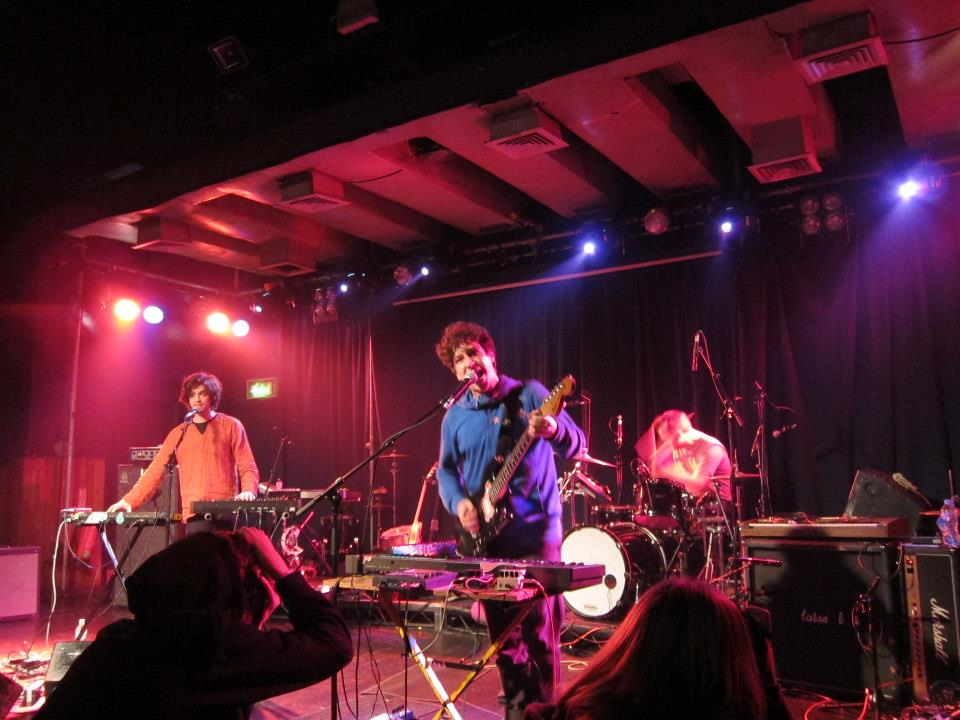
- Emperor Yes performing live at the Scala, London 2013

Background information
- Origin: London, UK
- Genres: psychedelic pop, synthpop
- Years active: 2011–2016
- Labels: Alcopop! Records, Tape Club Records
- Members: Ash Gardner; Hugo Sheppard; Adam Betts
- Website: soundcloud.com/emperoryes/

Emperor Yes are a band from London. They have released three singles and an album. They have toured with Emmy the Great and Tim Wheeler, and Tall Ships.

In 2014, Emperor Yes released their debut album An Island Called Earth through Alcopop! Records.

Both the band's singles "Wasps" and "Cosmos" have music videos and the band have held exhibitions of art based on the songs. "Cosmos" was produced by Summer Camp's Jeremy Warmsley with a video directed by Chris Boyle, and has been played by Annie Mac on BBC Radio 1. The vinyl of Cosmos has small fragments of an asteroid that crashed into Earth in the 1500s.

"Wasps" is the theme tune to the weekly QI podcast No Such Thing As A Fish and its TV spin-off No Such Thing as the News, and "Cosmos" is the theme song for Dan Schreiber's We Can Be Weirdos podcast.

== Discography ==
=== Albums ===
- An Island Called Earth (2014)

=== Singles ===
- "Fishes" (2012)
- "Cosmos" (2013)
- "The End of the World" (2014)
