= No Such Thing as the News =

- Genre: Comedy
- Directed by: Michael Matheson
- Presented by: James Harkin; Andrew Hunter Murray; Anna Ptaszynski; Dan Schreiber
- Theme music composer: Emperor Yes
- Country of origin: United Kingdom
- Original language: English
- No. of series: 2
- No. of episodes: 13

Production
- Producer: John Lloyd
- Production locations: Up The Creek Comedy Club, Greenwich, London
- Running time: 30 minutes
- Production company: QITV

Original release
- Network: BBC Two
- Release: 20 May – 30 November 2016

Related
- No Such Thing as a Fish; QI; The Museum of Curiosity; The Unbelievable Truth

No Such Thing as the News is a British television comedy series on BBC Two, which is a spin-off to the podcast No Such Thing as a Fish, produced and presented, from 20 May 2016, to 30 November 2016, by the researchers behind the panel game QI, also on BBC Two. In it each of the researchers – James Harkin, Andrew Hunter Murray, Anna Ptaszynski and Dan Schreiber – collectively known as "The QI Elves", present their favourite facts related to the previous week's news.

== Format ==
In each episode the Elves present their favourite fact that week which is connected to that week's news, and discuss related news and facts about it. They also read out news stories sent to them by viewers, which as of the second series is in a segment called "Special Correspondence", and also highlight other stories they did not have time to examine in greater depth. In the first series the end of the show also features a small sketch in which Dan goes over to BBC newsreader Jane Hill. In the second series the beginning of the show features a sketch with Hill and Matthew Amroliwala reading some obscure news stories, before the opening titles play.

On Friday, 17 February 2017 the Elves began a weekly Facebook Live topical broadcast summing up the week's news in a similar style to the television programme.

== Origin ==
No Such Thing as the News is a television spin-off to the No Such Thing as a Fish podcast, which sees the QI elves discuss their favourite facts that they had learned that week. The show's title comes from one of the facts revealed in the QI TV series. In the third episode of eighth series, also known as "Series H", an episode on the theme of "Hoaxes" reported that, after a lifetime studying fish, the biologist Stephen Jay Gould concluded that there was no such thing as a fish. He reasoned that while there are many sea creatures, most of them are not closely related to each other. For example, a salmon is more closely related to a camel than it is to a hagfish. The opening of early episodes of the podcast used to feature a recording of the elves mentioning this fact, which appears in the first paragraph of the Oxford Dictionary of Underwater Life.

== Production ==
The series was commissioned by James Harding, Director of BBC News. The show was recorded at the Up the Creek Comedy Club in Greenwich, London, and is produced by John Lloyd, the creator of QI. A pilot episode was made, which was not broadcast on TV but was released as Episode 114 of No Such Thing as a Fish.

== Reception ==
In a review for Chortle Steve Bennett wrote: "If you're a curious person too, your interest will definitely be piqued by the info imparted (now my internet search history includes 'didgeridoo in space' and 'sticky google car') and in a most entertaining way. Though quite what the weird handover to Jane Hill in the BBC newsroom just to call Schreiber 'Bernard' was all about defies explanation."

On Episode 130 of No Such Thing as a Fish it was announced that Series 2 would begin on 12 October 2016 at 11:15pm on BBC2.

== Episodes ==
=== Series 1 (2016) ===
No.	Title	Original release date
1	"Episode 1"	20 May 2016
The House of Commons of the United Kingdom has a special security measure designed to stop the Gunpowder Plot from ever happening again. (Murray) The International Space Station has quadruple glazed windows. (Schreiber) According to the former head of the Russian Anti-Doping Laboratory male athletes take their drugs with whisky and female athletes take their drugs with Martini. (Ptaszynski) Scientists have turned water into wine. (Harkin)
2	"Episode 2"	27 May 2016
On his trip to Vietnam, Barack Obama took with him his own personal blood bank, a fake Cadillac, and an exact replica of that fake Cadillac. (Ptaszynski) In Google's Paris offices, Friday meetings are accompanied with cheese and wine. (Harkin) Thomas Becket's elbow is currently on tour. (Schreiber) The world's largest solar power plant has just been set on fire, by itself. (Murray)
3	"Episode 3"	3 June 2016
The reason Winston Churchill looks so grumpy on the new £5 note is because someone has taken away his cigar. (Schreiber) At its opening ceremony, the world's longest tunnel was ceremonially blessed by a priest and them ceremonially not blessed by an atheist. (Murray) The judge who has just ruled that all UK tobacco packets have to be green is called Mr. Green. (Ptaszynski) Cicadas that have lived underground in Ohio for 17 years have finally emerged, only to be immediately eaten as an ice cream topping. (Harkin)
4	"Episode 4"	10 June 2016
The man after whom the UEFA Euro 2016 trophy is named after, Henri Delaunay, retired from refereeing after he swallowed his own whistle. (Harkin) In the Romanian local elections it is no longer permissible for candidates to give away free buckets as incentives to vote for them. (Murray) Muhammad Ali was a both a great magician and a terrible magician, because his faith frowned upon deception so he explained how all his tricks worked. (Schreiber) Archerfish can be trained to spit in people's faces. (Ptaszynski)
5	"Episode 5"	17 June 2016
Mongolia is changing all of its addresses. (Schreiber) The website addresses donaldtrumpsucks.com, iambeingsuedbythedonald.com and ihatetrumpvodka.com are all owned by Donald Trump. (Ptaszynski) Dishes you can eat at the world's best restaurant include "Memory of a mortadella sandwich", "The crunchy part of the lasagne" and "Oops! I dropped the lemon tarte". (Harkin) Britain's first robot office manager is called Betty and has a short-term contract in Milton Keynes. (Murray)

=== Series 2 (2016) ===
No.	Title	Original release date
6	"Episode 1"	12 October 2016
Three days before the second US Presidential Debate, Donald Trump announced that he was doing no preparation. He announced this at a town hall event where there was a moderator, all the questions were submitted by the audience and his answers were timed to be no longer than two minutes. (Schreiber) Insane Clown Posse have issued a statement saying that there is no such thing as an insane clown. (Harkin) This week, four separate pumpkin records have been broken: the biggest outdoors pumpkin grown in the UK, the biggest ever pumpkin in the USA, the biggest ever pumpkin in the world, and the furthest someone has travelled in a boat made out of a pumpkin. (Murray) No-one will be allowed to wear smartwatches in Theresa May's cabinet meetings as they fear the Russians might use them to eavesdrop. (Ptaszynski)
7	"Episode 2"	19 October 2016
The first time the British cabinet approved plans for a third runway at Heathrow Airport, the check-in was still a row of tents. (Murray) This week's leaked Hillary Clinton speeches only exist because her staff were sending them to each other saying: "What are we going to do if these get leaked?" (Harkin) This week scientists have discovered the reason why the sky goes dark at night. (Schreiber) There is a four-metre wide hole in Sir David Attenborough's bottom. (Ptaszynski)
8	"Episode 3"	26 October 2016
This week the Belgian foreign minister Didier Reynders's Twitter account tweeted: "Keep Calm and Love Canada". He only did this because someone else hacked into his account and tweeted a photo of former Canadian PM Stephen Harper with the message: "Hey Canada fuck you!" (Ptaszynski) The most famous snail currently in Britain, named Jeremy, is famous because its genitals are the wrong way round. (Schreiber) If you have $7,500 to spend and you want to attack a country, then you can buy a cyber army of 100,000 fridges or buy a single Tornado jet fighter for 10 minutes. (Harkin) On average three quarters of the studio audience are criminals. (Murray)
9	"Episode 4"	2 November 2016
Sales of Halloween masks have correctly predicted the winner of the US presidential election every year since 1980. This year, Donald Trump masks are outselling Hillary Clinton masks by 10%. (Harkin) The keys to the Church of the Holy Sepulchre are looked after by a Muslim family because the Christians can't be trusted with them. (Schreiber) In the Icelandic parliamentary election the second biggest-party fielded a candidate who died the previous week. (Ptaszynski) More than a third of men who took the new male contraceptive jab reported an increased sex drive, and one-in-twenty reported swelling of the breasts. (Murray)
10	"US Election Special" (Note: This episode was a special devoted to the US presidential election. There are no appearances from Hill or Matthew Amroliwala.)	9 November 2016
Last week, Donald Trump's campaign executive Steve Bannon's pants literally caught on fire as he was writing a speech for Trump. (Murray)
11	"Episode 6"	16 November 2016
As president, Donald Trump will earn one 12,000th as he did as a baby. (Murray) The past week has seen riots, vandalism and road blockages across India as people protested over salt shortages, even though there haven't been any salt shortages. (Ptaszynski) The man who coined the term "supermoon", astrologer Richard Nolle, prepared for it this week by stocking up on bottled water, canned goods and other emergency supplies. (Schreiber) Park Geun-hye, President of South Korea, is currently embroiled in a scandal about her closeness to Choi Soon-sil, an alleged shaman. The head of the country's national shaman organisation has complained that the scandal is giving genuine hard-working shamans a bad name. (Harkin)
12	"Episode 7"	23 November 2016
Before he was Chancellor of the Exchequer, Philip Hammond was a used car salesman. (Murray) The Oxford English Dictionary's 2016 word of the year is "post-truth", which is two words. Only seven out of their thirteen words of the year have been one word. (Ptaszynski) This week the Geostationary Operational Environmental Satellite was launched, which carries the most advanced weather predicting systems in history. It should have gone up three weeks ago, but it was delayed due to unforeseen weather conditions. (Harkin) As part of the Buckingham Palace refurbishment, the Queen will start using her leftovers to power her boilers. (Schreiber)
13	"Episode 8"	30 November 2016
Marita Lorenz, one of the people employed to assassinate Fidel Castro, ended up having sex with him instead. (Ptaszynski) This week, the safety at Chernobyl Nuclear Power Plant has increased greatly thanks to the site receiving some new vacuum cleaners. (Murray) If Jill Stein gets her way for recounting the vote in Pennsylvania in the 2016 US Presidential Election, they are going to have to recheck votes that were made for Mickey Mouse, Wonder Woman, Harambe (a Gorilla), None of the Above, We Deserve Better, and Shoot Me Now. (Harkin) In order to cope with the Black Friday rush, Birmingham's main shopping centre opened three hours early, but in the end the only shop with a queue was Greggs. (Schreiber)
