= James Harkin (podcaster) =

British podcaster

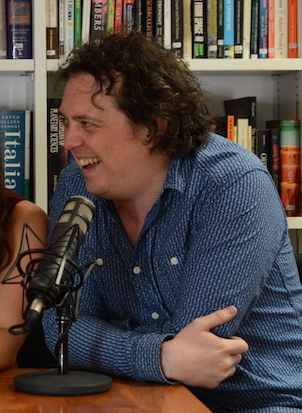
- Born: 29 September 1978 (age 46); Greater Manchester, England
- Occupations: Podcaster; host; writer
- Years active: 2014–present
- Known for: Host and editor, No Such Thing as a Fish; Presenter, No Such Thing as the News; Head researcher and writer, QI

James Michael Harkin (born 29 September 1978) is a British podcaster, television host, and television writer. He is one of the four regular hosts of the podcast No Such Thing as a Fish, together with Dan Schreiber, Andrew Hunter Murray, and Anna Ptaszynski. He was also a presenter of the BBC Two television show No Such Thing as the News. He is a researcher for the television show QI, where he has been both the head researcher and the head writer.

== Early life and education ==
Harkin grew up in Bolton. He attended The University of Sheffield, where he studied maths and physics. After graduating, he took a job as an accountant in Salford and Eccles, working first at a chain of hotels and then for a hospitality company. When he learned about the television game show QI, Harkin joined the internet forums for the show where the researchers would hold contests to submit the best fact, which Harkin regularly won.

== Career ==
After Harkin had submitted research to QI online for several months, producer John Lloyd offered him a position as a researcher at the show in London. Fellow No Such Thing host Andrew Hunter Murray later joked that Harkin had won so many of the cash prizes from QI's online fact-finding contests that it was cheaper for the producers to offer Harkin a job. Initially, Harkin was hired both as a researcher and as an accountant for the program. By 2017 he had become the head researcher for the show.

In March 2014 QI launched the spinoff podcast No Such Thing as a Fish, with Harkin as one of the show's four regular hosts. By the end of 2019, episodes of No Such Thing as a Fish had been downloaded over 250 million times. Harkin has gone on several national and international tours to record live tapings of No Such Thing as a Fish.

Harkin was a co-author of three books published by the podcast's co-hosts — The Book of the Year 2019, The Book of the Year 2018, and The Book of the Year 2017 — and a co-author of more than half of the books that were written using facts from the show QI. He was also involved in a television version of No Such Thing: along with the other regular hosts of the podcast, he was a presenter for the television series No Such Thing as the News on BBC Two.

In addition to being a host and presenter, Harkin has worked as a producer for the BBC, including working with Dan Schreiber as a producer for The Museum of Curiosity on BBC Radio 4.

Harkin's education in mathematics and physics, and his background in accounting, mean that he often supplies numerical or natural science facts for QI and No Such Thing as a Fish, and his use of puns has been reviewed positively.

In July 2024, Harkin and Anna Ptaszynski released the first episode of their new podcast Quite a Good Sport. The podcast is produced by QI.
