= Griefcast =

- Genre: performing arts podcast, arts podcast, comedy podcast
- Language: English

Cast and voices
- Hosted by: Cariad Lloyd

Production
- Production: Recorded at Whistledown Studios; Edited by Kate Holland; Music by the Glue Ensemble
- Length: 1 hour (approximate)

Publication
- Original release: 2016
- Provider: acast

Reception
- Ratings: 4.6/5

Related
- Website: https://cariadlloyd.com/griefcast

Griefcast is a British podcast about grief and loss. Hosted by comic and actor Cariad Lloyd, the podcasts feature hour-long conversations about grief and bereavement with people who have experienced the death of loved ones. Lloyd asks guests "Who are we remembering today?" at the start of each episode.

Many of the guests on Griefcast are also comics; in a 2018 interview Lloyd said: "If you have a comic sensibility, you do this at any serious event. You break awkwardness with jokes. It's a way of coping. You have a breath of laughter when, for a moment, you forget that someone you love is dying. It's like coming up for air."

Griefcast premiered in 2016 and was one of the top podcasts on iTunes within six months. It has won several awards, including Best Entertainment Podcast and Podcast of the Year at the British Podcast Awards and an ARIA Award for Best Podcast. In a 2018 article in FT, Fiona Sturges wrote: "If justification were needed for the existence of podcasts, this show is it." The final episode of Griefcast was recorded in January 2023.
