= Dan Schreiber =

Australian radio producer (born 1984)

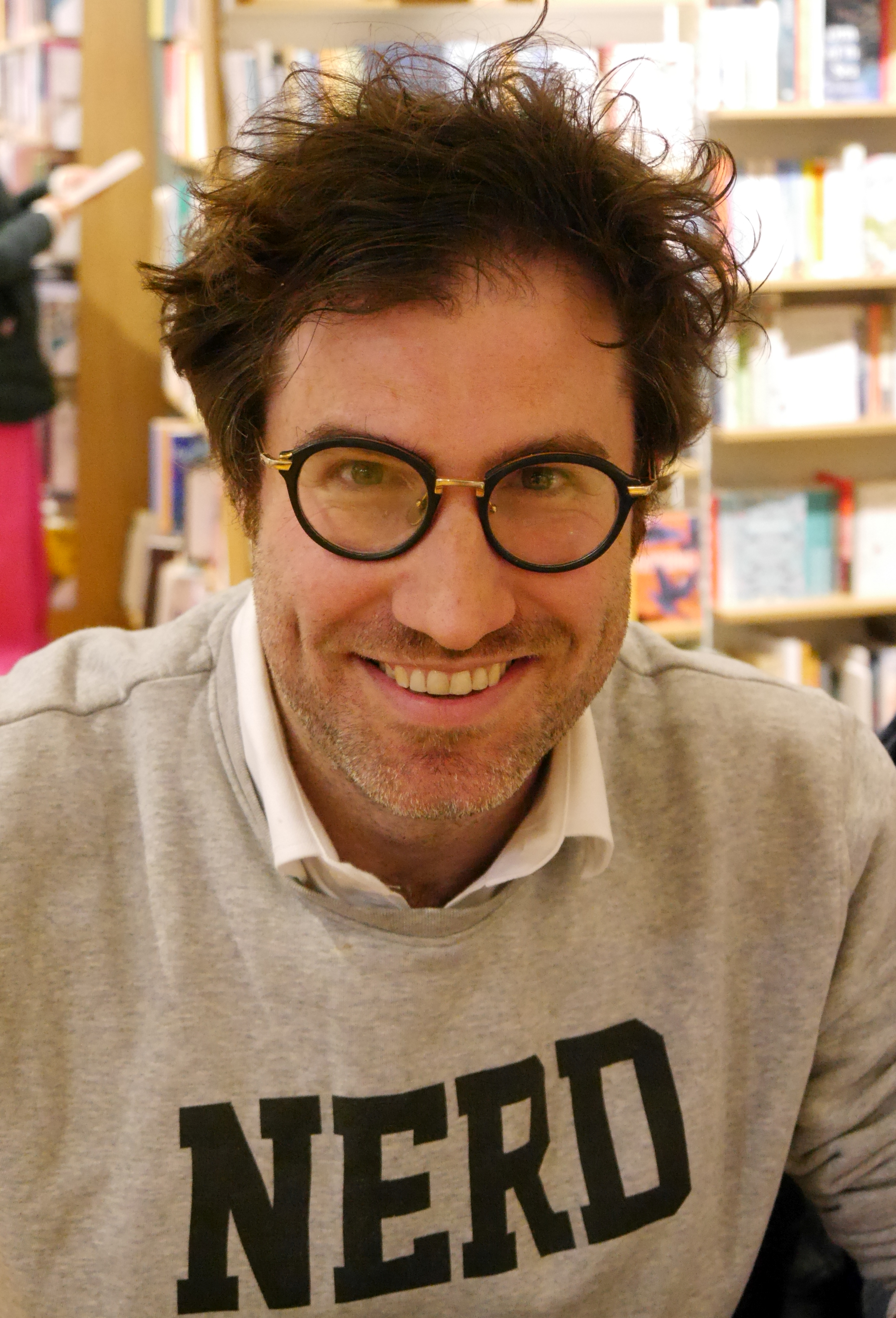
- Schreiber at Waterstones, London in 2023
- Born: Daniel Craig Schreiber; 28 April 1984 (age 42); British Hong Kong
- Occupations: Podcaster, producer, writer
- Notable work: No Such Thing as a Fish, The Museum of Curiosity
- Dan Schreiber's voice Recorded 9 August 2014

Daniel Craig Schreiber (born 28 April 1984) is an Australian radio producer, writer, podcaster, and comedian based in London. He co-created the BBC Radio 4 panel show The Museum of Curiosity with host John Lloyd and co-producer Richard Turner and co-hosts the podcast No Such Thing As A Fish.

== Early life ==
Schreiber was born in 1984 in British Hong Kong to an Australian father and a British mother, both of whom worked as celebrity hairdressers. He became proficient in Mandarin. The Schreibers moved to Sydney, Australia around the time Hong Kong changed from British rule to Chinese rule. He moved to the UK at age 19 after QI creator John Lloyd offered him a job while Schreiber was visiting family in Oxford. He has a sister, Chyna, and a brother.

== Career ==
Schreiber began at the television panel game show QI as a researcher, or "elf", shortly after moving to England. He co-created and co-produces The Museum of Curiosity starting in 2008; co-hosts the cryptozoology-focused podcast The Cryptid Factor with Rhys Darby, David Farrier and producer Leon 'Buttons' Kirkbeck starting in 2013; and co-created, co-hosts, and co-produces the podcast No Such Thing As A Fish alongside James Harkin, Andrew Hunter Murray and Anna Ptaszynski starting in 2014. Schreiber also appeared as a panelist and presenter on the BBC panel show No Such Thing as the News, a spin-off of the No Such Thing As a Fish podcast. The program's two series aired in 2016. While staying at his in-laws' house during the COVID-19 pandemic, Schreiber created Show Us Your Shit (also known as Show Us Your Shit (or: Some Shakespeare, A Pair of Pyjamas & A Mutton Chop)), an Instagram Live series. Each episode features a different guest who shows Schreiber and the audience a selection of interesting objects from around their home. On 6 June 2020, Schreiber was featured on the BBC Radio 4 series Loose Ends to discuss Show Us Your Shit. In 2021, The Tournament, a show devised by Schreiber along with James Rawson and Simon Urwin, aired on BBC hosted by Alex Scott.

After five seasons working for QI, Schreiber started as head of development for ComedyBox, an online channel from Warner, which financially supported comedy projects and provided a forum for comedians to share their content. There, he executive produced Ken Russell's short Christmas film A Kitten for Hitler and Flight of the Conchords star Rhys Darby's ComedyBox clips and stand-up DVD Imagine That! As a stand-up comedian in his own right, Schreiber has toured with FolkFace from Radio 1's Chris Moyles Show and was a regular panelist on the E4 show Dirty Digest. Schreiber's comic debut at the Edinburgh Festival Fringe was his show Cockblocked From Outer Space in 2014. In 2015, he was the presenter in the Channel 4 documentary The Great UFO Conspiracy, which examined beliefs about aliens in the UK. Since hosting the cancelled pilot of his own radio show, which featured guests Rhys Darby, John Lloyd, Ismo Leikola, and John Gribbin in 2009 Schreiber has also been a guest on BBC Radio 4's Don't Make Me Laugh with David Baddiel and Fresh From The Fringe as well as a variety of podcasts including Judge John Hodgman and Richard Herring's Leicester Square Theatre Podcast.

Schreiber has also contributed to a number of books, including The Naked Jape by Jimmy Carr; the QI spinoffs The Book of General Ignorance and G Annual; and No Such Thing as a Fish's The Book of the Year series. He released his first stand-alone book, The Theory of Everything Else: A Voyage into the World of the Weird, in October 2022.

== Personal life ==
Schreiber and his wife Fenella have three sons named Wilf, Ted and Kit.
