= Game of the scene =

Game of the scene is a concept in the longform format of improvisational theater.

== Definitions ==
There are various ways to define the Game of the scene, as different clubs will have their own interpretations of it. Some common definitions are:

- The first unusual thing to happen in the scene and how it will go on to define the scene.
- A pattern that arises from the relationship between the characters.

== Application ==
Working the concept into a player's scene work is known as “playing the game”. When the Game is discovered the players have two ways to apply it into the scene.

=== Exploring ===
Players can explore the Game by delving into the psychology of their characters and try to understand why they do the things that they do.

=== Heightening ===
The Game can be escalated by raising the stakes. A character's actions can be taken to the extreme or they can be placed in more absurd situations to see how the Game plays out.

== Moving beyond the game ==
It is noted that focusing too much on trying to find the Game can cause players to miss the game entirely. Some players say that one should not pay too much attention while performing, and that they should only try to have fun. The Game will naturally arise so long as the player focuses on the immediate relationship.

== See also ==
- Upright Citizens Brigade
- The Second City
- Del Close
- Harold
- Yes, and...
