= Cariad Lloyd =

British comedian, actress, writer and podcaster

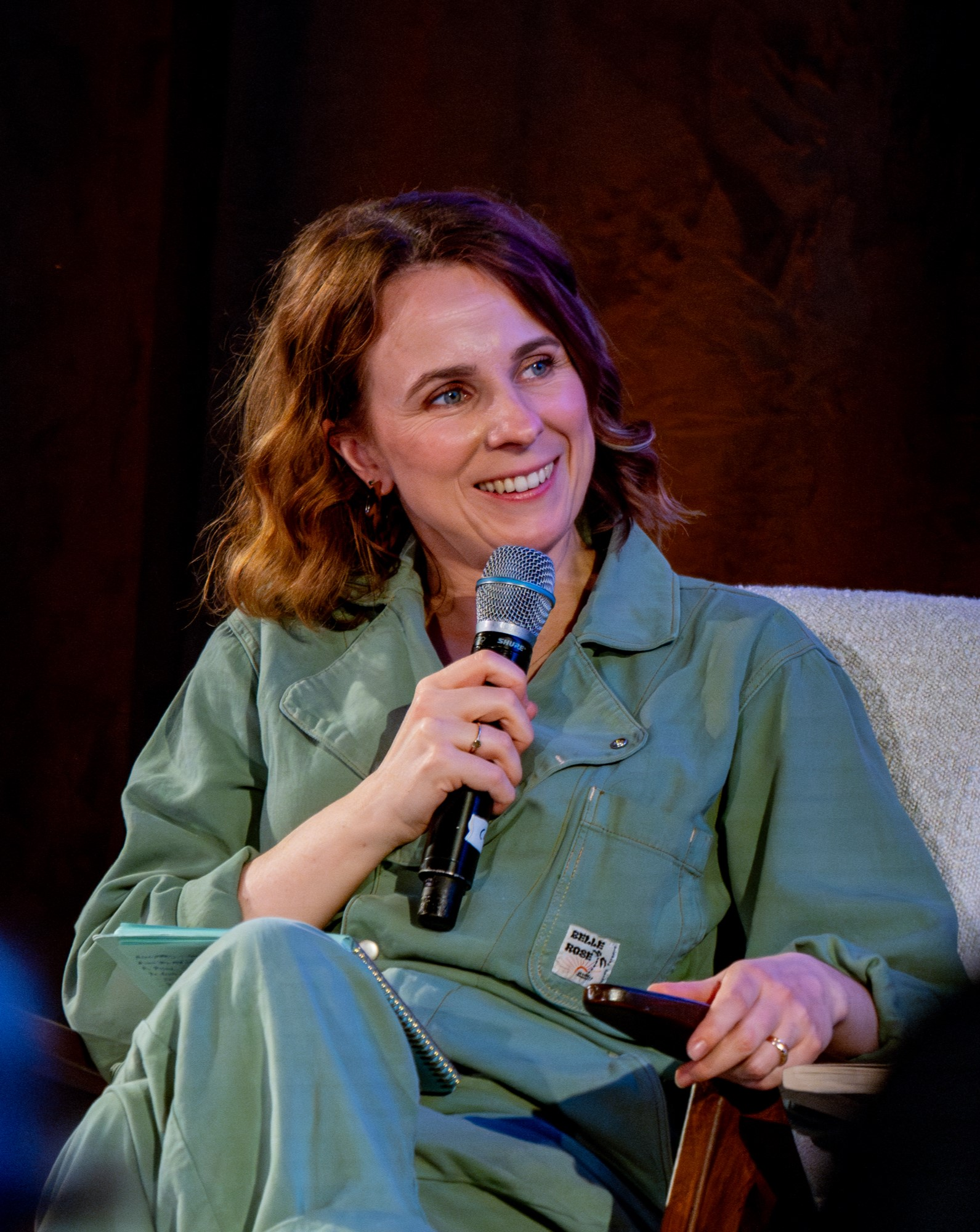
- Lloyd in 2024
- Born: Katie Cariad Lloyd; 1983 (age 42–43); London, England
- Education: University of Sussex (BA)
- Occupations: Comedian; actress; writer; podcaster
- Years active: 2004–present
- Website: cariadlloyd.com

Katie Cariad Lloyd (born 1983) is a British comedian, actress, writer, and podcaster. She is a member of the improvisational comedy group Austentatious, the creator and host of Griefcast, and an improv teacher.

Lloyd was nominated in 2011 for Best Newcomer at the Fosters Edinburgh Comedy Awards for her debut solo show, Lady Cariad's Characters. She also won the Edtwinge award for most positively tweeted-about show during the Fringe.

Lloyd's podcast, Griefcast has won several awards, including best Entertainment Podcast and Podcast of the Year at the British Podcast Awards and an ARIA Award for Best Podcast.

In November 2023, it was announced that Lloyd signed a five-book deal with Hachette Children's Group.

== Early life ==
Lloyd was born in North London in 1983. She is of Welsh descent on her father's side. Her father ran his own business. Her mother was a working class background, growing up in the East End of London. Lloyd has an older brother; four years her senior.

Growing up, Lloyd's parents were interested in alternative ideas and lifestyles, and were members of the Erdhard Seminar Training (EST) (now Landmark Forum) organisation, and visited the intentional community known as Findhorn.

Lloyd grew up going to the theatre. The first time knew she wanted to perform was when she saw a performance of Lady Macbeth at Regent's Park Open Air Theatre when she was 4 years old.

Lloyd's father died of pancreatic cancer in April 1998 (having been diagnosed in February of that year) aged 44, when she was 15. Lloyd had to sit her GCSEs a month after his death, but managed to do well. Her paternal grandfather died six months after her father's death.

She studied English literature at the University of Sussex, where she first met her friend and fellow comedian Sara Pascoe. Lloyd worked with Pascoe as a tour guide on open-top buses in London. Whilst appearing on Would I Lie to You? Lloyd mentioned working at a call-centre where she was fired for impersonating various accents; whilst on QI she mentioned that she has also worked as a barmaid.

== Career ==
=== Television and radio work ===
Lloyd has performed in numerous sketches on BBC Comedy Online including Funtime (a Dawson Bros. pilot), The Proposal and Dirty Dancing. She has performed for the BBC Radio 4 shows Newsjack, My First Planet, The Now Show, Small Scenes and The Guns of Adam Riches.

Lloyd has appeared on television shows such as Channel 4's Cardinal Burns and CBBC's Fit and DNN, and in films such as Baby Cow Productions' Caravan and Film4's Hallo Panda.

She wrote and performed in her own comedy pilot for BBC Three, The Cariad Show. In May 2014, BBC Radio 4 aired a pilot for The Cariad Radio Show, which was featured on the BBC Comedy of the Week podcast. Since 2014, she has been co-writing and performing in the BBC Radio Wales sketch comedy show Here Be Dragons.

In 2014, Lloyd starred as Holly in the BBC Three comedy pilot Vodka Diaries and as Poppy in the comedy series Give Out Girls on Comedy Central. In 2015, she played Dawn, a warden in a young offenders' institution in the BBC Three comedy series Crims. In 2016, she appeared in the initial two episodes of Walliams & Friend on BBC One. She was also a series regular, playing several semi-improvised characters on Murder in Successville with Tom Davis.

Lloyd is a regular panellist on QI, having appeared in 16 episodes as of October 2026. She has also appeared on Have I Got News for You, Would I Lie to You?, The News Quiz and 8 Out of 10 Cats Does Countdown.

She appeared in the final series of Peep Show as Megan.

In 2020, she appeared in Sara Pascoe's comedy series Out of Her Mind for BBC television.

In March 2021, she presented the BBC Radio 4 programme What Have We Learnt About Grief? This programme mentioned the work of Elisabeth Kubler-Ross. From March 2024, she appeared as a member of the Wales team on Round Britain Quiz.

=== Live performance ===
In 2011, Lloyd took her debut solo show, Lady Cariad's Characters to the Edinburgh Festival Fringe. The show was about six characters, with the premise that she had booked loads of acts and they hadn't shown up, so it was just Lloyd performing all the characters. She was nominated for Best Newcomer at the Fosters Edinburgh Comedy Awards for the show. She also won the Edtwinge award for most positively tweeted-about show during the Fringe.

Lloyd has performed in a variety of live shows since 2006, including The Freewheelin' Cariad Lloyd at Edinburgh Festival Fringe in 2012. In 2013, she performed in The 50 Hour Improvathon at Hoxton Hall, and The Freewheelin' Cariad Lloyd at Soho Theatre among others. In 2014, she performed at the Edinburgh Fringe with Louise Ford in Cariad and Louise's Character Hour.

Lloyd is a member of the improvisational comedy group Austentatious. In 2014, the show won the Chortle Award for Best Character, Improv or Sketch Act, and two DVDs of one of their live shows have been released by Go Faster Stripe in 2015 and 2018. Other members of the group include Rachel Parris, Amy Cooke-Hodgson and Joseph Morpurgo.

=== Writing ===
Lloyd's book, You Are Not Alone, was published in 2023. In a review in The Times, the book was described as "a blackly funny, honest, thought-provoking and compassionate book that will be of comfort to all who know loss".

Llyod is a judge for the Women's Prize for Fiction.

=== Podcasts ===
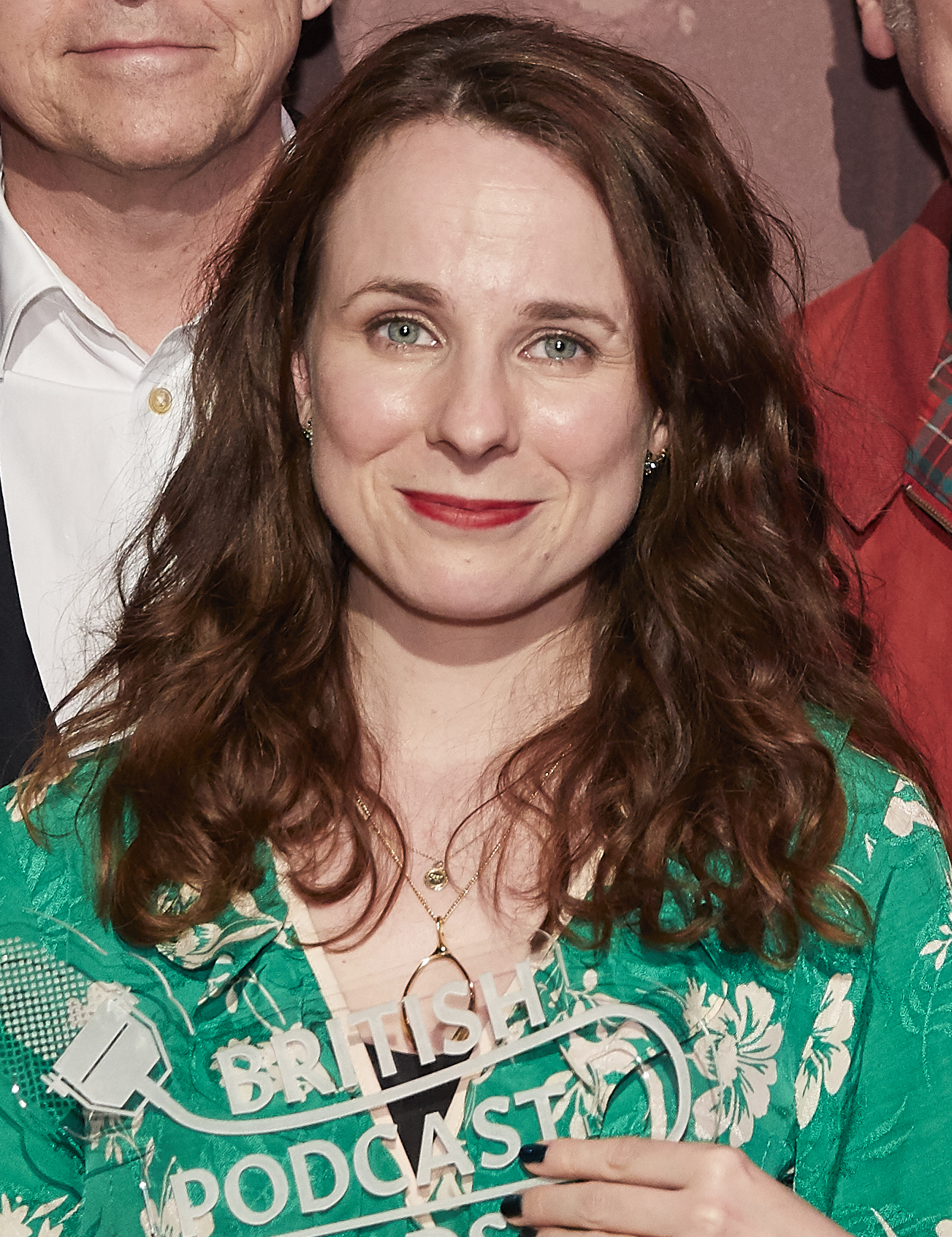
Lloyd at the 2018 British Podcast Awards, where Griefcast won in three categories

Lloyd created and hosted the podcast Griefcast, a series of conversations about death, bereavement, and coping with the loss of a loved one. It won several awards, including "Best Entertainment Podcast", "Best Interview Podcast" and "Podcast of the Year" at the British Podcast Awards and an ARIA Award for "Podcast of the Year".

Lloyd has appeared on other comedians' podcasts including Pappy's Flatshare Slamdown in 2012, Richard Herring's Leicester Square Theatre Podcast in 2016, Do the Right Thing in 2017, and Mike Wozniak's "St. Elwick's Neighbourhood Association Newsletter Podcast" as Veronica Tooze MBE, in 2021.

== Personal life ==
Lloyd is married and had her first child in 2018.

Lloyd is an ambassador of Pancreatic Cancer UK.

== Filmography ==
=== Film ===
Year	Title	Role	Notes
2004	Pour un temps	The Sister	Short films
2006	Hallo Panda	Sarah	Short films
2010	0507	(unknown)	Short films
2012	What Time Do You Call This?	Jo	Short films
2013	Gus and His Dirty Dead Dad	Ffion	Short films
2017	Custom Love	Isabella	Short films
2018	The 1st	Julia	Short films
2018	Mister Biscuits	Andrea	Short films
2019	Roundheads and Cavaliers	Alice	Short films
2019	Asparagus Tips	Asparagus	Short films

=== Television ===
Year	Title	Role	Channel	Notes	Ref
2012	Cardinal Burns	Various	Channel 4	Series 1, Episodes 2, 3, 6	
2012–2014	Comedy Feeds	Various / Holly	BBC Three	Episodes: "Dawson Bros. Funtime", "The Cariad Show" and "Vodka Diaries"	
2013	Fit	Various	CBBC	Episode: "#1.2"	
2013	DNN: Definitely Not Newsround	Stacey-May Anais	CBBC	Episode: "#1.1"	
2013	Badults	Fiona		Episode: "Past"	
	The Cariad Show	Various, Writer	BBC Three	Pilot	
2013–2014	Crackanory	Miss Hopps / Tamsin / Sheila / Mary Hardacre		Series 1, Episodes 2 & 3, and Series 2, Episodes 3 & 4	
2014	GameFace	Lucie		Television film	
2014	Siblings	Debbie		Episode: "Balcombe's Funeral"	
2014	Toast of London	Lindy Makehouse		Episode: "Buried Alive"	
2014	Give Out Girls	Poppy		Main role. Episodes 1–6	
2015	Crims	Dawn		Recurring role. Episodes 1–6	
2015	The Delivery Man	Alice		Episode: "Truth"	
2015	Inside No. 9	Gemma		Episode: "Séance Time"	
2015	Ruby Robinson	Virginia Robinson		Television film	
2015	Marley's Ghosts	Miss Randolph		Episode: "#1.2"	
2015	Peep Show	Megan		Series 9, 5 episodes	
2015	Sky Comedy Christmas Shorts	Mum		Episode: "Joseph Morpurgo's Christmas"	
2015–2017	Murder in Successville	Various		Series regular, 8 episodes	
2015, 2017, 2019	Have I Got News for You	Herself - Guest panellist		Episodes: "#49.7", "#53.5" and "#57.5"	
2015–2025	QI	Herself - Panellist		16 episodes	
2016	Drunk History	Anne Boleyn		Episode: "Geordie Shore Special"	
2016	I Want My Wife Back	Keeley		Series regular, 5 episodes	
2016	Shimmer and Shine	Princess Samira (UK voice)		Episodes: "Welcome to Zahramay Falls" and "Flying Flour"	
2016	Morgana Robinson's The Agency	Hannah		Episode: "#1.3"	
2016	Halloween Comedy Shorts	Estate Agent		Episode: "Ross Noble's Horror: The Catchment"	
2016	Walliams & Friend	Sammy / Various		Episodes: "Jack Whitehall" and "Harry Enfield"	
2016	Tracey Ullman's Show	Make-up Assistant		Episodes: "#1.1" and "The Best of..."	
2016	Virtually Famous	Herself - Panellist		Episode: "#3.2"	
2016, 2017	8 Out of 10 Cats Does Countdown	Herself - Contestant		Episodes: "#8.02", "#11.7" and "#14.1"	
2017	The Real History of Sex	Various		Mini-series	
2017	Josh	Karen		Episode: "Bicycles & Babies"	
2017	The Last Leg	Herself		Episodes: "The Correspondents 5: Trump Hunters" and "The Correspondents 9: Sanitising Period Poverty"	
2018–2025	Pointless Celebrities	Herself - Contestant		Episodes: "#10.41", "#12.18", "#15.23" and "#17.20"	
2018	Would I Lie to You?	Herself - Panellist		Series 11, Episode 8	
2018	Funny Women: Julie Walters	Herself		Television film	
2019	This Time with Alan Partridge	Alice Fluck		Series 1, Episode 1	
2019	Hypothetical	Herself - Guest		Series 1, Episodes 7 & 8	
2019	Lee and Dean	Dani		Series 2, Episodes 1–5	
2019	Tourist Trap	Llinos Lyn		Series 2, Episode 3: "Screen"	
2019	The Snail and the Whale	Teacher (voice)		Television film	
2020	Sick of It	Stallholder		Series 2, Episode 5: "Use by Date"	
2020	Out of Her Mind	Scoopy		Series 1, 5 episodes	
2021	Superworm	Mama Beetle / Mama Toad (voice)		Television film	
2021–2022	Richard Osman's House of Games	Herself - Contestant		Series 5, Episodes 31–35, and Series 6, Episodes 56–60	
2022	The Witchfinder	Dorothy		Series 1, Episode 4	
2022, 2024	Between the Covers	Herself - Panellist		Series 4, Episode 2, and Series 8, Episode 4	
2023	Tabby McTat	Prunella (voice)		Television film	
2023–2025	Changing Ends	Miss Gideon		Recurring role. 7 episodes	
2024	Beyond Paradise	Claire Moss		Series 2, Episode 2	
2024	My Sexual Abuse: The Sitcom (The Actual Sitcom)	Herself / Auntie / Defence Barrister		Television Special	
2026	Ellis	Pippa Ellerson		Series 2, Episodes 1 & 2: "Ashenham: Parts One and Two"	
