= Andrew Hunter Murray =

English writer, podcaster and comedian

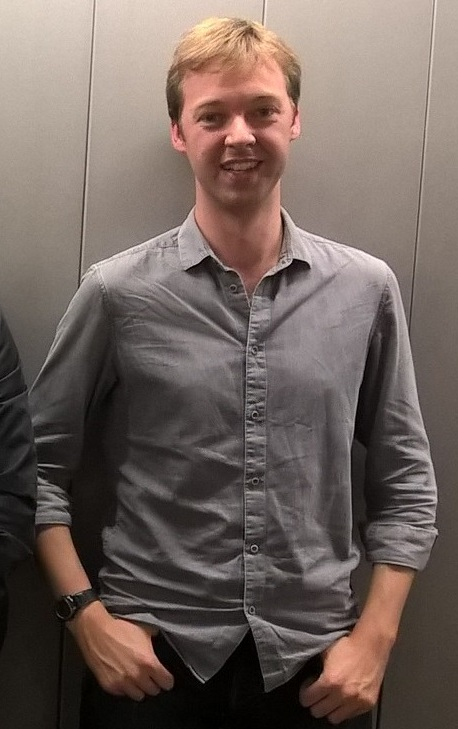
- Murray in 2015
- Born: 1987 (age 38–39)
- Education: Keble College, Oxford
- Occupations: Author, podcaster, actor, comedian
- Employer(s): Private Eye, Austentatious, QI
- Notable work: Novels: "The Last Day", "The Sanctuary", "A Beginner's Guide to Breaking and Entering" Radio: The Naked Week [BBC Radio]
- Television: No Such Thing as the News

Andrew Hunter Murray (born 1987) is an English writer, podcaster and comedian.

== Early life ==
Murray went to school at King's College School in Wimbledon. He then read English Literature at Keble College, Oxford.

== Career ==
Murray was a writer and researcher for the BBC panel show QI up until he left the show in 2024, as a member of the team known as the "QI Elves". He co-hosts the spin-off podcast series No Such Thing as a Fish in which he and three other QI Elves – Anna Ptaszynski, James Harkin and Dan Schreiber – share their favourite facts from the week. Murray wrote and co-presented the podcast's spinoff television series No Such Thing as the News. He currently hosts "Drop Us a Line" as part of the No Such Thing As A Fish podcast. Since 2023, Murray has been the host of the BBC Radio 4 satirical comedy podcast "The Naked Week", based on the week's news.

Murray works as a writer for Private Eye magazine and hosts the magazine's podcast, Page 94.

Murray's debut novel, The Last Day, a dystopian thriller set in a future where the Earth has stopped spinning, was published in February 2020. Film and television rights for the novel have been sold to Stone Village Television. His second book, The Sanctuary, was published in May 2022. His third novel A Beginner's Guide to Breaking and Entering was published in 2024.

His fourth book Bad Deeds was published in June 2026.

Murray is a member of the Jane Austen-themed improvisational comedy troupe Austentatious.
