= Haley McGee =

Canadian actress, writer and comedian

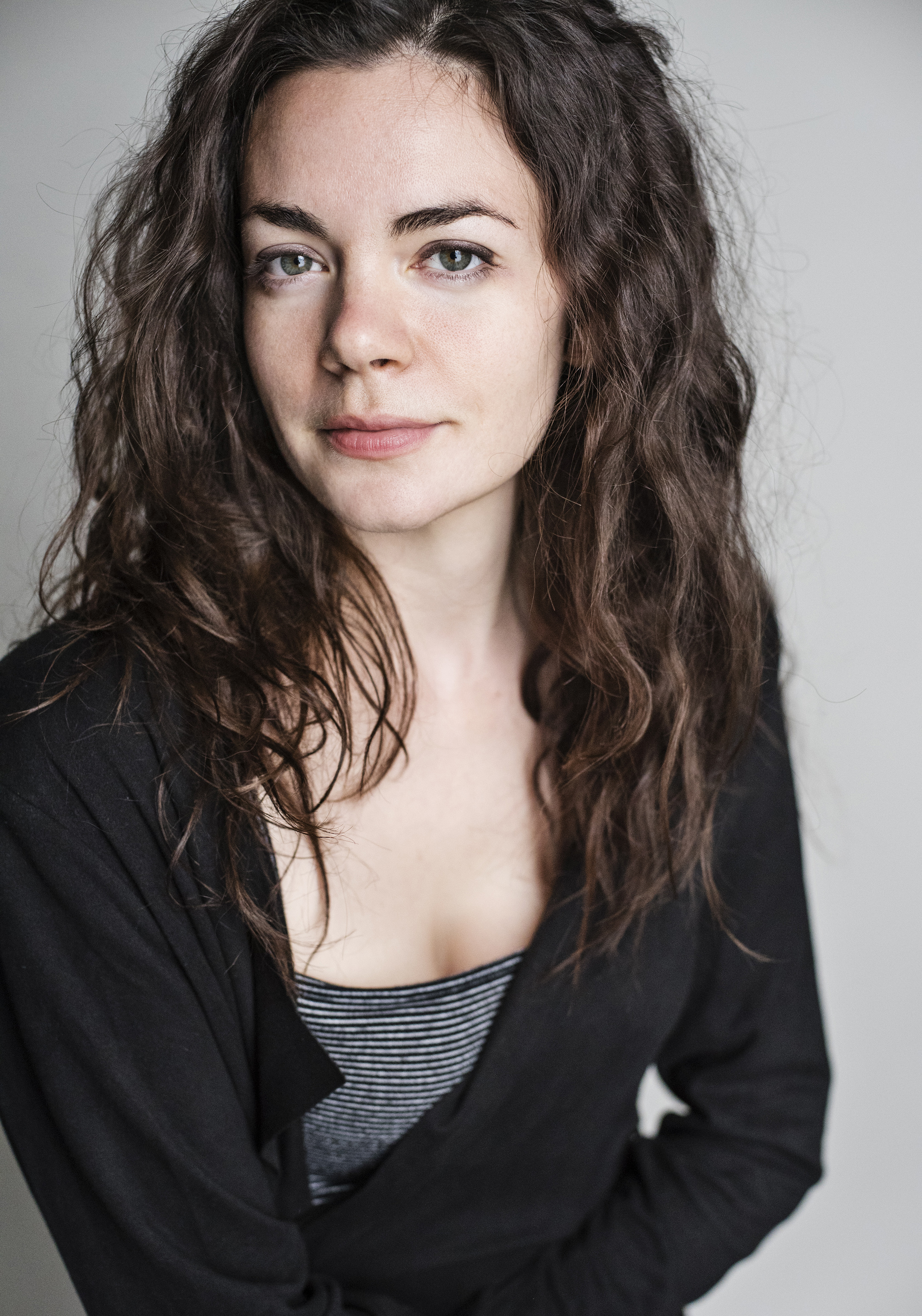
- McGee in 2018
- Born: 1985 or 1986
- Citizenship: Canadian
- Education: Ryerson University (BFA in Theatre Performance – Acting)
- Occupations: Actor; writer; comedian
- Years active: 2008–present
- Known for: Nikola Tesla's Night of Terror
- Website: http://www.haleymcgee.ca/

Haley McGee is a Canadian actress, writer and comedian based in London. McGee is best known for her role as Dorothy Skerritt, the personal assistant to Nikola Tesla in the Doctor Who episode "Nikola Tesla's Night of Terror". She is also known for her solo performances, most recently Age Is A Feeling and The Ex-Boyfriend Yard Sale.

== Age Is A Feeling ==
McGee's 2022 show premiered at the Edinburgh Festival and was a winner of the Fringe First Award.

It tells the story of a single human life from the 25th birthday until death. The story is told entirely in the second person and includes sections of branching narrative based on audience selections. The show began its run at Edinburgh on 27 July 2022, and continued at the Soho Theatre in London from 6 September 2022 until 11 March 2023. The piece was nominated for an Olivier Award in 2023.

The Scotsman's Fergus Morgan described the show as "a superb performance and a sensitive, smartly structured piece of writing, full of wit and an astonishing amount of wisdom from someone who's only 36 years old."

== The Ex-Boyfriend Yard Sale ==
McGee's 2018 solo show invited the audience to value eight objects, each a gift from a former boyfriend. McGee stated that the inspiration for the show was finding herself in debt after moving to London, and needing to work out which objects should be sold in order to pay off her debts.

McGee developed the show in partnership with Melanie Frances, a mathematician and digital artist who helped develop a formula which included inputs such as the "relationship index", measures her time with each ex on a scale of one-to-ten, "how hard they made you laugh, the ratio of fun-to-misery and how good the sex was". McGee reveals how the formula is derived as the show unfolds.

The show was adapted into a book which was published in May 2021 by Penguin Random House Canada and Hodder & Stougton in the UK. McGee. McGee also developed this concept into an audio series, The Cost of Love, an interview format podcast released concurrently with the book.

== 14 Day Creative Challenge ==
During the COVID-19 Lockdown of summer 2020, McGee developed and led a 14 Day Creative Challenge, a self-directed programme intended to allow artists to remain creative at a time when venues for creative work remained closed. The programme reached an online audience of over 1000.

== Works ==
- Oh My Irma (2011)
- Weather the Weather (2013)
- I'm Doing This for You (2015)
- The Public Servant (2015)
- The Ex-Boyfriend Yard Sale (2018)
- Age Is a Feeling (2022)

McGee was nominated for the 2022 Offie for Best Performance - her solo show Age Is a Feeling.

== Filmography ==
Year	Title	Role	Notes
2009	Urban Legends	Bethany Dickson	TV series, episode: "Family Affairs"
2015	Murdoch Mysteries	Susan Trent	TV series, episode: "Pipe Dreamzzz"
2016	Shut Eye	Haley	Short film
2016	Star Ocean: Anamnesis	Mystina	Video game, credited as Haylee McGee
2020	Doctor Who	Dorothy Skerritt	TV series, episode: "Nikola Tesla's Night of Terror"
2023	Love Again	PR Lady	Feature-length film
	The Wall		Short film
