= No Such Thing as a Fish =

Comedy podcast

No Such Thing As A Fish
- Genre: Comedy
- Language: British English

Creative team
- Created by: The QI Elves

Cast and voices
- Hosted by: James Harkin; Andrew Hunter Murray; Anna Ptaszynski; Dan Schreiber

Music
- Opening theme: "Wasps" by Emperor Yes

Publication
- No. of episodes: 657
- Original release: 8 March 2014
- Updates: Weekly, every Friday

Reception
- Ratings: 4.72/5

Related
- Website: https://www.nosuchthingasafish.com/

No Such Thing as a Fish is a weekly British podcast series produced and presented by the researchers behind the BBC Two panel game QI. In the podcast each of the researchers, collectively known as "The QI Elves", present their favourite fact that they have come across that week. The most regular presenters of the podcast are James Harkin, Andrew Hunter Murray, Anna Ptaszynski and Dan Schreiber, and there are occasional guest presenters. When one of the regular presenters is unavailable for any reason, fellow QI elves Alex Bell and Anne Miller often take their place.

Since the launch of the podcast it has attracted 700,000 subscribers. In 2014 No Such Thing as a Fish was named by Apple as the "Best New Podcast" that year. In 2015 and 2016 it won the "Internet Award" in the Chortle Awards. In 2018 the podcast won the Heinz Oberhummer Award for Science Communication.

In May 2016, a television spin-off series entitled No Such Thing as the News began on BBC Two.

As of September 2025, there are over 600 episodes of the podcast, usually ranging between 30 minutes and an hour. A new episode is released every Friday.

== Title ==
The title for No Such Thing as a Fish comes from a fact in the QI TV series. In the third episode of the eighth series, also known as "Series H", an episode on the theme of "Hoaxes" reported that after a lifetime studying fish, the biologist Stephen Jay Gould concluded that there was no such thing as a fish. He reasoned that although there are many sea creatures, most of them are not closely related to each other. For example, a salmon is more closely related to a camel than it is to a hagfish. The opening of early episodes of the podcast used to feature a recording of the elves mentioning this fact, which appears in the first paragraph of the Oxford Encyclopedia of Underwater Life.

== Format ==
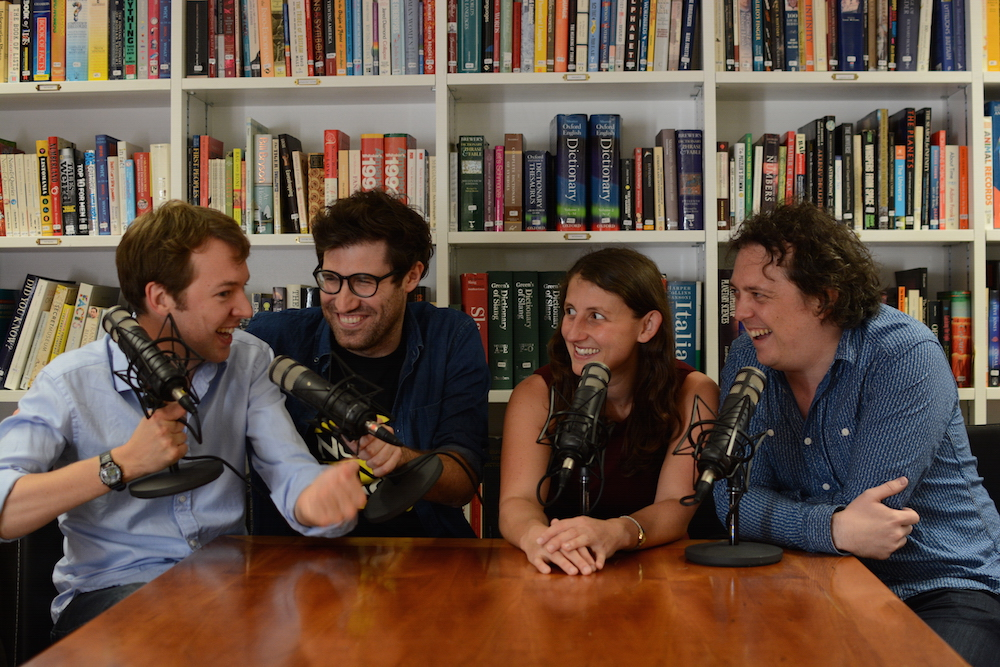
The regular QI elves who present No Such Thing as a Fish (left-to-right); Andrew Hunter Murray, Dan Schreiber, Anna Ptaszynski and James Harkin.

In each episode each presenter takes it in turn to present their favourite fact that they have come across that week. They discuss the information surrounding that fact, and the other presenters add in extra facts and information connecting to it.

== Production ==
In an interview with ThreeWeeks, Schreiber said the podcast "came about because too many facts in the QI office kept going to waste. Like the time Chief Elf James Harkin looked up from his computer and said: 'You know there are currently over 600 guys in the world with two dicks'. We decided to gather round a microphone once a week and share our favourite facts we'd found that week." Murray told The Independent: "We almost released it by mistake. We uploaded it and only mentioned it on our own personal social media accounts. We thought it was good, but the reaction has been lovely. It seems like there's a real appetite for more podcasts like this. There is a feeling of resurgence of the whole medium."

Until mid-2023, episodes were recorded at the QI offices in Covent Garden; the offices have since moved to Holborn. There have been live recordings in other locations, usually whilst on tour, as well as from the hosts' individual homes during COVID-19 lockdowns. The theme tune used is the song "Wasps" by Emperor Yes, whose lead singer Ash Gardner has also appeared as a guest on the podcast.

== Reception ==
Miranda Sawyer in The Observer gave the podcast a positive review writing, "the podcast is jolly, packed with impressive and silly facts, and so far hasn't descended into too much in-joke chumminess, so hooray for No Such Thing as a Fish".

Comedy critic Bruce Dessau wrote on his Beyond the Joke blog that: "All it lacks is the likes of Alan Davies [a panelist on the TV version of QI] and co chipping in with their comedic quips, but there are still plenty of laughs to be had."

In December 2014 the podcast was named by Apple as the "Best New Podcast" for 2014. In March 2015 it won the "Internet Award" in the 2015 Chortle Awards. It won the same award again in March 2016.

In April 2019 it was announced that the podcast won the "Heinz Oberhummer Award für Wissenschaftskommunikation" (Heinz Oberhummer Award in science communication), an Austrian award for excellence in science communication. The award is named after Heinz Oberhummer, an Austrian physicist, founder and former part of an Austrian science cabaret, the Science Busters.

== Products ==
On 20 November 2015, The Complete First Year of No Such Thing As A Fish LP record was released, containing a bonus-length exclusive episode not planned for broadcast, featuring a guest appearance of Corey Taylor. The LP, released by Alcopop! Records, included downloadable versions of the first 52 episodes of the series, covering the entire first year of the podcast. It was released on heavyweight black and yellow limited edition vinyl.

On 2 November 2017, a book written by the four presenters entitled No Such Thing as a Fish presents The Book of the Year was published, which features facts collected during the year 2017.

== Comic Relief marathon special ==
In aid of Comic Relief for 2021, a one-off marathon special was streamed live for over 20 hours across 12–13 March 2021, featuring 35 guests for 35 minutes each.
