= Max & Ivan =

Comedy double act

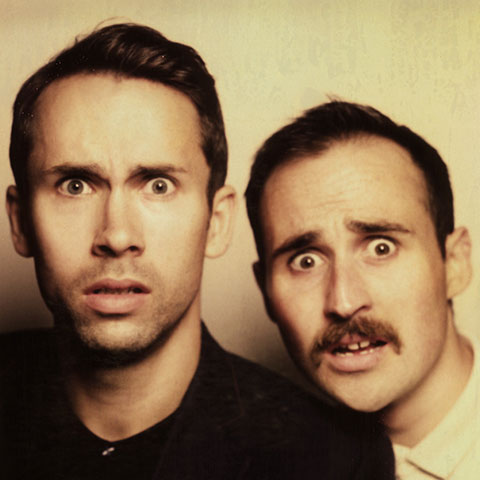
- Notable work: The Casebook of Max & Ivan; The Reunion; W1A

Comedy career
- Years active: 2007–present
- Medium: Theatre, radio, television
- Genres: Comedy, sketch comedy, theatre
- Website: www.maxandivan.com

Max Olesker and Ivan Gonzalez are a British comedy duo known collectively as Max & Ivan. They are the creators, writers and stars of the BBC Radio 4 series The Casebook of Max & Ivan and Channel 4 Comedy Blap The Reunion. They also appear together as Ben & Jerry in BBC Two's W1A.

The duo met at Royal Holloway, University of London, where they produced the radio show (and later podcast) Max and Ivàn: Exposed for the college's Insanity Radio station. They co-founded London improvised comedy theatre The Free Association and perform live narrative sketch comedy across the world.

== Style and influences ==
In episode 73 of The Comedian's Comedian with Stuart Goldsmith, Max & Ivan describe their live shows as narrative sketch comedy; writing character-led narratives that feature interweaving plot lines. They perform these multi-character shows with no costume changes and minimal use of props.

Comedy acts that Max & Ivan have cited as influences include The League of Gentlemen, Victoria Wood, Matt Lucas, David Walliams, Steve Coogan and the Marx Brothers.
