= Austentatious =

Long-form improvised comedy show

- An Improvised Jane Austen Novel
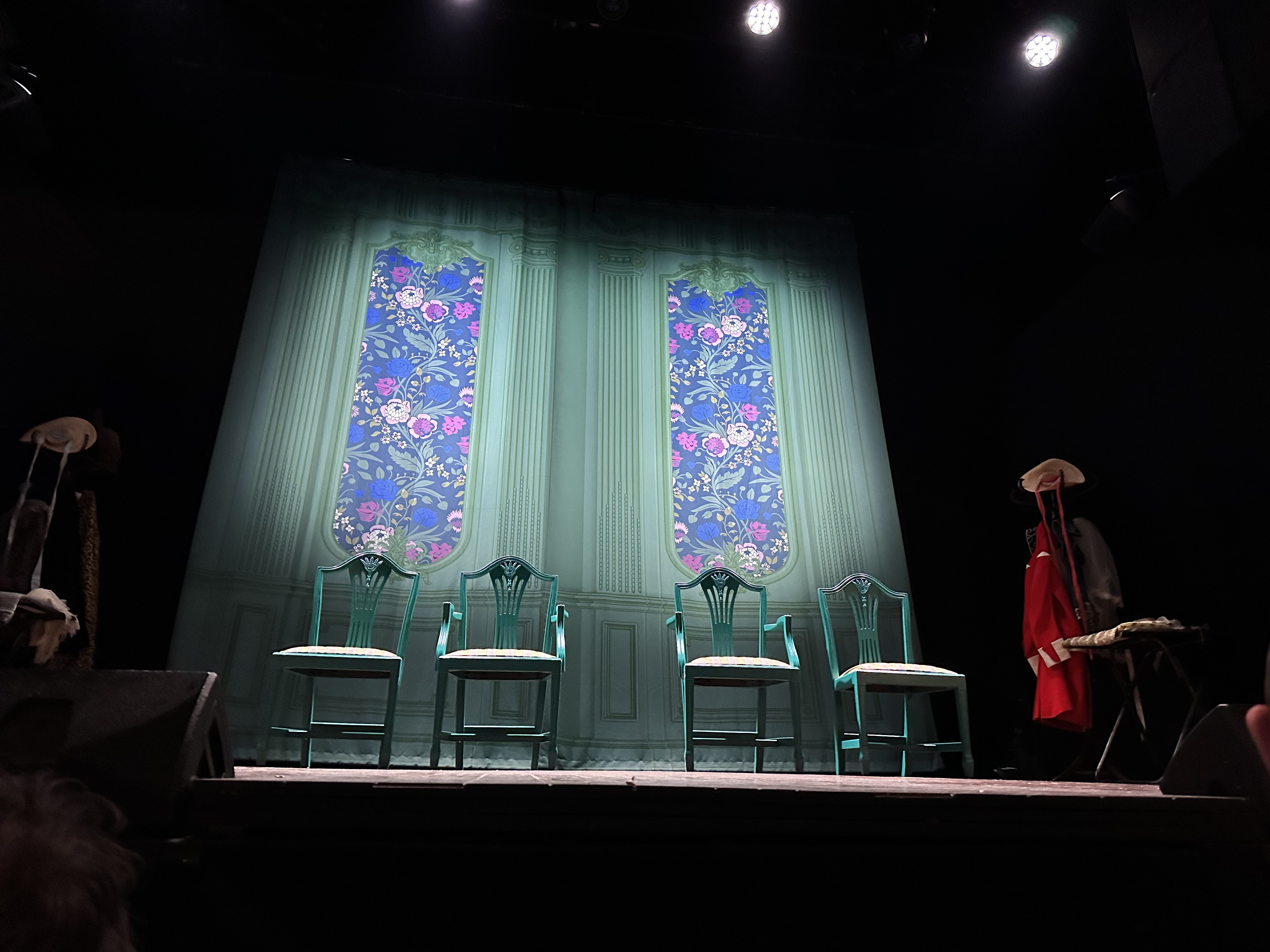
- Setting: Home Counties, England
- Basis: Works of Jane Austen; Comedy; History (theatrical genre); Improvisational theatre
- Premiere: 2011: West End of London
- Productions: Premiered in London in 2011; Edinburgh Festival Fringe since 2012; Residency in West End of London since 2017, currently at the Vaudeville Theatre.
- Awards: 2014 Chortle Award for Best Character, Improv or Sketch Act

Austentatious (An Improvised Jane Austen Novel) is a long-form improvised comedy show, in the style of a Jane Austen novel, where each show is improvised by a six-strong cast, based on a title suggested by a member of the audience. Beginning in 2011 in London, the original cast members took the show to the Edinburgh Festival Free Fringe in the summer of 2012. Following their initial success, they began performing a monthly show in London, transferring to the West End in 2017, and have since performed on BBC Radio 4, on tour, and at the Edinburgh Fringe.

From November 2022, Austentatious was performed weekly at the Arts Theatre in the West End. After a winter break over December 2022, the Monday evening performances resumed in February 2023 and ran until December 2023.

The show later announced a renewed residency at the Arts Theatre, starting in late January 2024, scheduled until late July 2024.

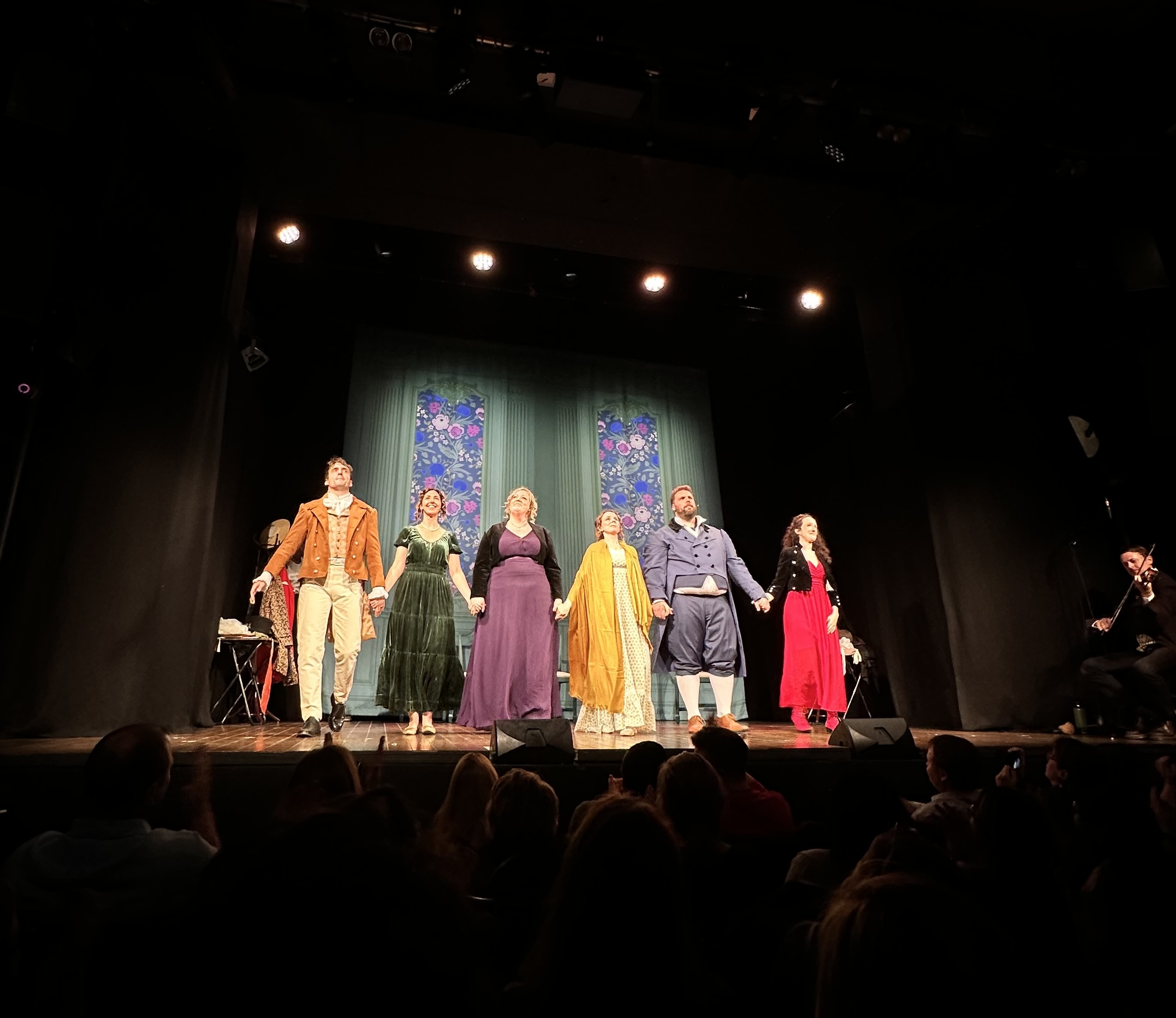
The cast of a performance of Austentatious in October 2023.

The show also appeared at Regent's Park Open Air Theatre on 16 July 2023, and at McEwan Hall as part of the Fringe Festival from 5 to 13 August 2023.

== Cast ==
Austentatious was originally formed by members of The Oxford Imps and has gained and lost members since 2011. The 9 current members perform six at a time and include:

- Amy Cooke-Hodgson (founder)
- Graham Dickson (founder)
- Cariad Lloyd (founder)
- Joseph Morpurgo (founder) – nominated for an Edinburgh Comedy Award in 2015 for solo work
- Andrew Hunter Murray (founder)
- Rachel Parris (founder)
- Charlotte Gittins
- Daniel Nils Roberts
- Lauren Shearing – also a cast member of Showstopper! The Improvised Musical

== Performances ==
At the beginning of the show, audience members are asked to suggest a title in the 'style' of Jane Austen; past titles have included Bath to the Future (referencing both the city of Bath and the Back to the Future film) How To Court a Gent in 10 Days (a take on the film How to Lose a Guy in 10 Days), Mansfield Shark (a pun on Austen's book Mansfield Park), Strictly Come Darcy (referring to the television show Strictly Come Dancing and Austen's character Mr. Darcy), and Shelves in the Closet (a reference to Elizabeth Bennet's line in Pride and Prejudice).

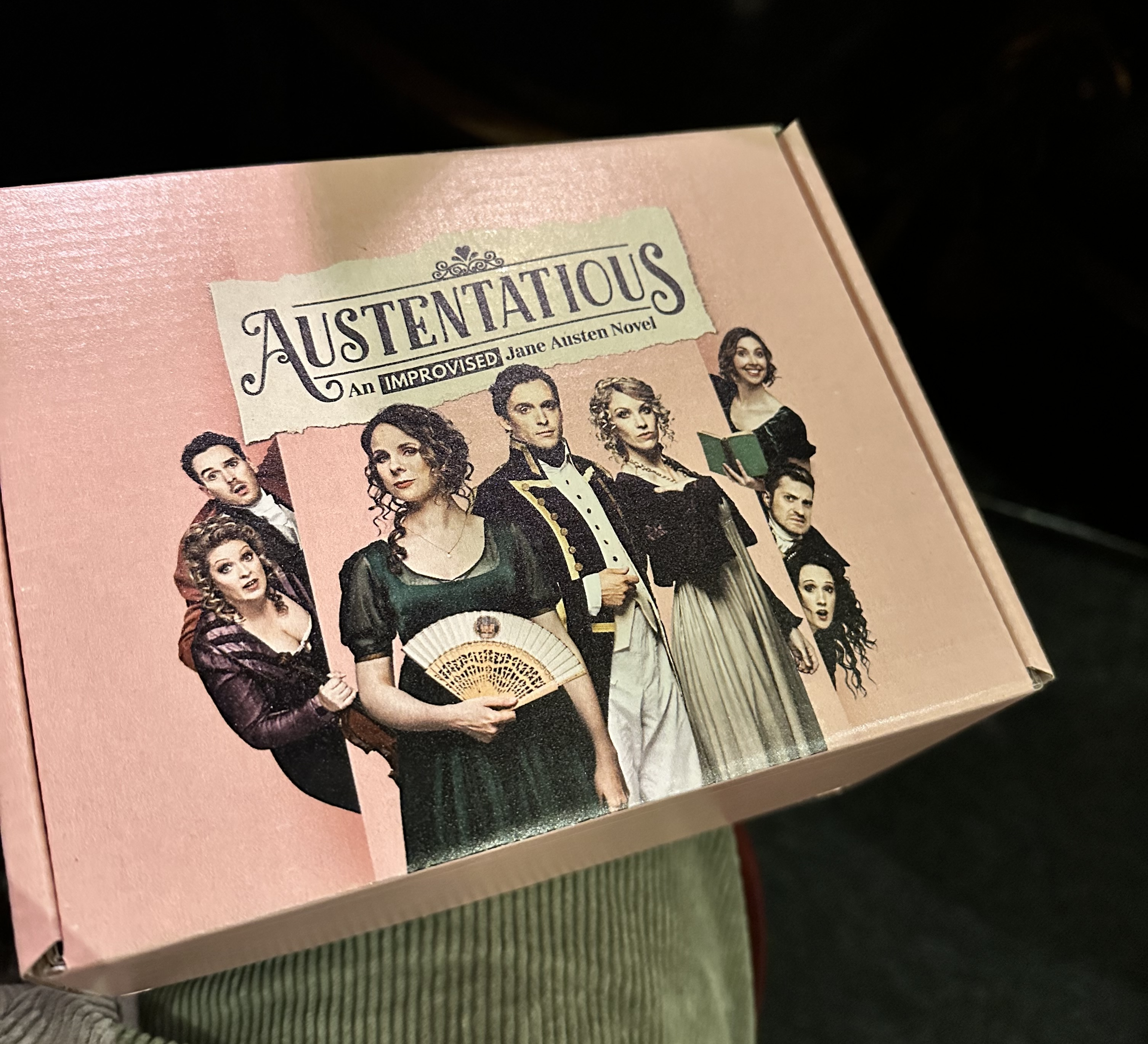
A gift box given to VIP seating at the Arts Theatre containing Austentatious merchandise and memorabilia.

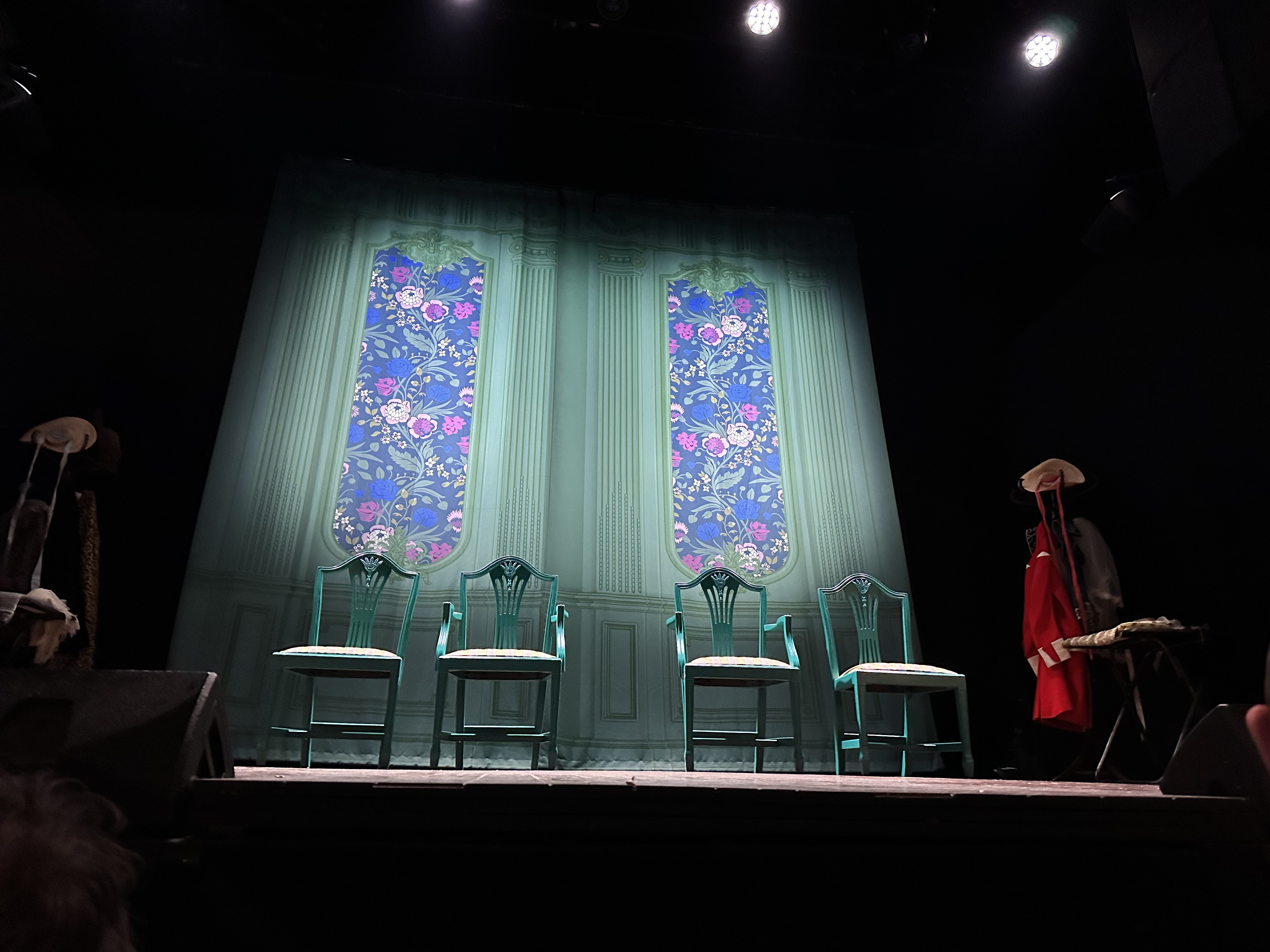
The Austentatious stage pre-performance in June 2023, showing the regal backdrop and wooden chairs.

Austentatious was performed at the Queen's Reading Room Festival at Hampton Court Palace on 11 June 2023. Queen Camilla herself chose the title of Persuasion and an Odd Occasion for the performance.

== History ==
=== Origin ===
Four of the original six members of the cast, Cooke-Hodgson, Morpurgo, Murray and Parris had been members of The Oxford Imps while studying in Oxford and wanted to explore long-form improvised comedy. Parris and Cooke-Hodgson originated the idea of a Jane Austen themed show, and together with fellow improvisers Lloyd and Dickson, then began performing Austentatious together.

=== Early success ===
After initial performances in London in 2011, the original cast performed the show at the 2012 Free Fringe, receiving positive reviews and sell-out crowds.

Following this success they continued to perform across the UK, adding Roberts and Gittins to the cast. They began a regular monthly show in London, initially at the Leicester Square Theatre and have returned to the Edinburgh Fringe annually, selling out the show every year from 2014 to 2018. In 2013 The Guardian's review gave the show four stars and described it as "one of the most enjoyable 60 minutes on the fringe".

In 2014 the show won the Chortle Award for Best Character, Improv or Sketch Act.

=== West End transfer ===
They transferred to the Piccadilly Theatre for a West End run in 2017, and have since performed in a number of West End venues, adding Shearing to the cast, including the Fortune Theatre from February 2019. They have performed two 30-minute shows on BBC Radio 4, and have performed in McEwan Hall, the largest space at the festival, during the Fringe.

A further residency at the Fortune Theatre was announced for February to July 2020. The residency was cut short after West End theatres shut as part of the COVID-19 lockdown. On 29 August 2020, they performed a one-off outdoor show in Streatham.

From November 2022, the show occupied a weekly residency at the Arts Theatre that ran throughout 2023 with a summer break. This residency was extended from January 2024 to July 2024.

From March 2025, the show had a weekly residency every Monday at the Vaudeville Theatre that was set to last until July 2025.

== See also ==
- Jane Austen fan fiction
