= Collaboration graph =

Graph modeling collaboration in a social network

In mathematics and social science, a collaboration graph is a graph modeling some social network where the vertices represent participants of that network (usually individual people) and where two distinct participants are joined by an edge whenever there is a collaborative relationship between them of a particular kind. Collaboration graphs are used to measure the closeness of collaborative relationships between the participants of the network.

== Types considered in the literature ==
The most well-studied collaboration graphs include:

- Collaboration graph of mathematicians also known as the Erdős collaboration graph, where two mathematicians are joined by an edge whenever they co-authored a paper together (with possibly other co-authors present).
- Collaboration graph of movie actors, also known as the Hollywood graph or co-stardom network, where two movie actors are joined by an edge whenever they appeared in a movie together.
- Collaborations graphs in other social networks, such as sports, including the "NBA graph" whose vertices are players where two players are joined by an edge if they have ever played together on the same team.
- Co-authorship graphs in published articles, where individual nodes may be assigned either at the level of the author, institution, or country. These types of graphs are useful in establishing and evaluating research networks.

== Features ==
By construction, the collaboration graph is a simple graph, since it has no loop-edges and no multiple edges. The collaboration graph need not be connected. Thus each person who never co-authored a joint paper represents an isolated vertex in the collaboration graph of mathematicians.

Both the collaboration graph of mathematicians and movie actors were shown to have "small world topology": they have a very large number of vertices, most of small degree, that are highly clustered, and a "giant" connected component with small average distances between vertices.

== Collaboration distance ==
The distance between two people/nodes in a collaboration graph is called the collaboration distance. Thus the collaboration distance between two distinct nodes is equal to the smallest number of edges in an edge-path connecting them. If no path connecting two nodes in a collaboration graph exists, the collaboration distance between them is said to be infinite.

The collaboration distance may be used, for instance, for evaluating the citations of an author, a group of authors or a journal.

In the collaboration graph of mathematicians, the collaboration distance from a particular person to Paul Erdős is called the Erdős number of that person. MathSciNet has a free online tool for computing the collaboration distance between any two mathematicians as well as the Erdős number of a mathematician. This tool also shows the actual chain of co-authors that realizes the collaboration distance.

For the Hollywood graph, an analog of the Erdős number, called the Bacon number, has also been considered, which measures the collaboration distance to Kevin Bacon.

== Generalizations ==
Some generalizations of the collaboration graph of mathematicians have also been considered. There is a hypergraph version, where individual mathematicians are vertices and where a group of mathematicians (not necessarily just two) constitutes a hyperedge if there is a paper of which they were all co-authors.

A multigraph version of a collaboration graph has also been considered where two mathematicians are joined by $k$ edges if they co-authored exactly $k$ papers together. Another variation is a weighted collaboration graph where with rational weights where two mathematicians are joined by an edge with weight $\tfrac{1}{k}$ whenever they co-authored exactly $k$ papers together. This model naturally leads to the notion of a "rational Erdős number".

== See also ==
- Graph theory – Area of discrete mathematics
