= Kevin Bacon filmography =

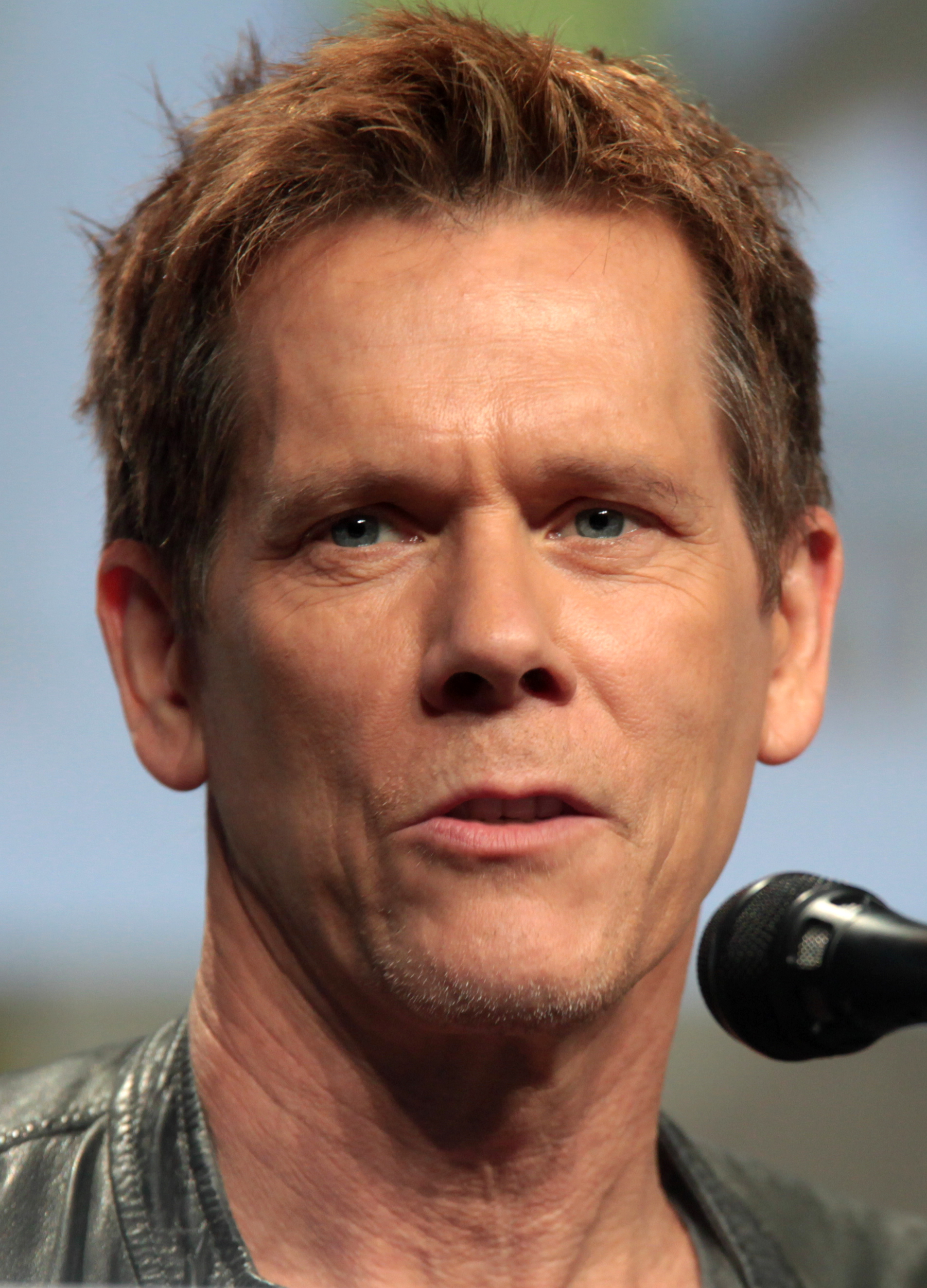
Bacon at the 2014 San Diego Comic-Con

The following is the filmography for American actor Kevin Bacon. His most notable roles have been in: National Lampoon's Animal House (1978), Friday the 13th (1980), Diner (1982), Footloose (1984), Quicksilver (1986), White Water Summer (1987) She's Having a Baby (1988), Flatliners and Tremors (both 1990), He Said, She Said and JFK (both 1991), A Few Good Men (1992), The River Wild (1994), The Air Up There (1994), Murder in the First and Apollo 13 (both 1995), Sleepers (1996), Wild Things (1998), Stir of Echoes (1999), Hollow Man and My Dog Skip (both 2000), Trapped (2002), Mystic River (2003), The Woodsman (2004), Death Sentence (2007), Frost/Nixon (2008), X-Men: First Class and Crazy, Stupid, Love (both 2011), Black Mass (2015), Patriots Day (2016), The Darkness (2016) and MaXXXine (2024).

In 2009, he starred in the television movie Taking Chance, for which he won a Golden Globe Award for Best Actor – Miniseries or Television Film and the Screen Actors Guild Award for Outstanding Performance by a Male Actor in a Miniseries or Television Movie. He had previously won a Screen Actors Guild Award in 1995 as part of the ensemble cast of Apollo 13. In 2013, Bacon starred in the Fox television series The Following in his first regular role on television, for which he won a Saturn Award for Best Actor on Television.

== Film ==
Key
†	Denotes films that have not yet been released

Year	Title	Role	Notes	Ref.
1978	Animal House	Chip Diller		
1979	Starting Over	Husband - Young Couple	Scene deleted but still credited	
1980	Hero at Large	2nd Teenager		
1980	Friday the 13th	Jack Burrell		
1981	Only When I Laugh	Don Holcroft		
1982	Diner	Timothy Fenwick Jr.		
1982	Forty Deuce	Ricky		
1983	Enormous Changes at the Last Minute	Dennis		
1984	Footloose	Ren McCormack		
1986	Quicksilver	Jack Casey		
1987	White Water Summer	Vic		
1987	End of the Line	Everett		
1987	Planes, Trains and Automobiles	Taxi Racer		
1988	She's Having a Baby	Jefferson "Jake" Edward Briggs		
1989	Criminal Law	Martin Thiel		
1989	The Big Picture	Nick Chapman		
1990	Tremors	Valentine "Val" McKee		
1990	Flatliners	David Labraccio		
1991	Pyrates	Ari		
1991	Queens Logic	Dennis		
1991	He Said, She Said	Dan Hanson		
1991	JFK	Willie O'Keefe		
1991	A Little Vicious	The Narrator	Short film	
1992	A Few Good Men	Captain Jack Ross		
1994	The Air Up There	Jimmy Dolan		
1994	The River Wild	Wade		
1994	New York Skyride	The Narrator	Short film	
1995	Murder in the First	Henri Young		
1995	Apollo 13	Jack Swigert		
1995	Balto	Balto	Voice	
1996	Sleepers	Sean Nokes		
1997	Picture Perfect	Sam Mayfair		
1997	Digging to China	Ricky Schroth		
1997	Telling Lies in America	Billy "Magic"		
1998	Wild Things	Sergeant Ray Duquette	Also executive producer	
1999	Stir of Echoes	Tom Witzky		
2000	My Dog Skip	Jack Morris		
2000	We Married Margo	Himself		
2000	Hollow Man	Sebastian Caine		
2001	Novocaine	Lance Phelps		
2002	Trapped	Joe Hickey		
2003	Mystic River	Detective Sean Devine		
2003	In the Cut	John Graham		
2003	Imagine New York	Himself	Short film	
2004	The Woodsman	Walter		
2004	Cavedweller	Randall Pritchard		
2004	Natural Disasters: Forces of Nature	The Narrator	Short film	
2005	Loverboy	Marty Stoll	Also director and producer	
2005	Beauty Shop	Jorge Christophe / George Christie		
2005	Where the Truth Lies	Lanny Morris		
2007	The Air I Breathe	Dr. Love		
2007	Death Sentence	Nick Hume		
2007	Rails & Ties	Tom Stark		
2007	Saving Angelo	Brent	Short film	
2008	New York, I Love You	Man	Segment: "These Vagabond Shoes" (cut from theatrical release)	
2008	Frost/Nixon	Jack Brennan		
2009	My One and Only	Dan Devereaux		
2009	These Vagabond Shoes	Tom	Short film	
2009	Beyond All Boundaries	Robert Sherrod	Voice; short film	
2010	Super	Jacques		
2011	Elephant White	Jimmy "The Brit"		
2011	X-Men: First Class	Sebastian Shaw		
2011	Crazy, Stupid, Love	David Lindhagen		
2012	Jayne Mansfield's Car	Carroll Caldwell		
2013	R.I.P.D.	Bobby Hayes		
2013	Skum Rocks!	Himself		
2015	Cop Car	Sheriff Kretzer		
2015	Black Mass	FBI Agent-In-Charge Charles McGuire		
2016	The Darkness	Peter Taylor		
2016	Patriots Day	Richard DesLauriers		
2017	Tour de Pharmacy	Ditmer Klerkin		
2020	You Should Have Left	Theo Conroy		
2022	Space Oddity	Jeff McAllister		
2022	They/Them	Owen Whistler		
2022	One Way	Fred Sullivan Sr.		
2023	The Toxic Avenger	Bob Garbinger		
2023	Leave the World Behind	Danny		
2024	MaXXXine	John Labat		
2024	Beverly Hills Cop: Axel F	Captain Cade Grant		
2025	The Best You Can	Stan Olszewski	Also producer	
2026	Family Movie		Also director and producer	
2027	Beach Read †		Filming	
TBA	Summoner †	Jefferson Haddock	Filming	

== Television ==
Film
Year	Title	Role	Notes	Ref.
1979	Search for Tomorrow	Todd Adamson		
1979	The Gift	Teddy Devlin	Television film	
1980–1981	Guiding Light	T.J. "Tim" Werner # 2	7 episodes	
1983	The Demon Murder Case	Kenny Miller	Television film	
1984	Mister Roberts	Ensign Frank Pulver	Television film	
1986, 1988	American Playhouse	Probation Officer, Alan	Episodes: "The Little Sister" (uncredited) and "Lemon Sky"	
1991	Saturday Night Live	Himself	Host; episode: "Kevin Bacon/INXS"	
1994	Frasier	Vic	Voice; Episode: "Adventures in Paradise: Part 2"	
1996	Losing Chase	—N/a	Director only	
1997	Destination Anywhere	Mike	Television film	
2000	God, the Devil and Bob	Himself	Voice; episode: "Bob Gets Involved"	
2002, 2006	Will & Grace	Himself	2 episodes	
2006–2009	The Closer	—N/a	4 episodes; director only	
2009	Taking Chance	Lieutenant Colonel Michael Strobl	Television film	
2009	The Magic 7	Himself	Television film	
2009	Human Family Tree	The Narrator	Documentary	
2010	Bored to Death	Himself	Episode: "Forty-Two Down!"	
2011	Robot Chicken	Pringle / Ren McCormack	Voice; episode: "Beastmaster and Commander"	
2013–2015	The Following	Ryan Hardy	45 episodes	
2016	Comedy Bang! Bang!	Himself	Episode: "Kevin Bacon Wears a Blue Button Down Shirt and Brown Boots"	
2016–2017	I Love Dick	Dick	8 episodes	
2017	Tour de Pharmacy	Ditmer Klerken	Television film	
2017	Story of a Girl	Michael	Television film	
2019	SMILF	Himself	Episode: "So Maybe I Look Feminine"	
2019	Live in Front of a Studio Audience	"Pinky" Peterson	2 episodes	
2019–2022	City on a Hill	Jackie Rohr	Main role	
2021	Ben & Jerry's: Battle of the Cone	Himself	Special guest; episode: "Six Flavors of Kevin Bacon"	
2022	The Guardians of the Galaxy Holiday Special	Kevin Bacon (fictionalised version of himself)	Television special	
2023	RuPaul's Drag Race	Himself	Special guest (season 15); episode: "Reunited!"	
2025	American Dad!	Himself	Voice; episode: "The Legend of Mike Madonia, the Rototiller Man"	
2025	The Bondsman	Hub Halloran	Lead role	
2025	Sirens	Peter Kell	Main role; miniseries	

== Video games ==
Year	Title	Voice
1996	You Don't Know Jack Volume 2	Himself

== See also ==
- Six Degrees of Kevin Bacon
