= ActivePresentation =

ActivePrez (formerly ActivePresentation)
- Developer(s): YOUpresent Ltd.
- Stable release: 1.0 / May 11, 2010
- Operating system: Microsoft Windows
- Type: Presentation
- License: Proprietary
- Website: ActivePrez

ActivePrez (formerly ActivePresentation Designer) is a software presentation program developed by YOUpresent (formerly GMARK Ltd.) It is an extension to the Microsoft Office PowerPoint software and runs on the Microsoft Windows computer operating system. The primary objective of ActivePrez is to overcome the serial nature of PowerPoint and provide a web like, hierarchical and interactive interface within a PowerPoint slide show.

== PowerPoint Usage ==
PowerPoint has become the ubiquitous solution for professionals to present their ideas, companies and products alike to their audience. Since its inception in 1984 and although purely electronic, PowerPoint has followed the thought process of its physical predecessor, the overhead projector, in which a presenter physically wrote the text and diagrams of the story board sequence on a roll of acetate transparencies. In both scenarios, the presenter is mandated to follow the sequential flow of the presentation slide material. In modern business environments, the audience is often likely to ask questions out of sequence and for a PowerPoint presenter, this can be dealt with in one of three ways. The first is to the defer the question which can be frustrating for the person raising it, even more so if the presenter forgets to answer it. The second is to rapidly press the Page Down and Page Up keys on the computer keyboard in order to find the slide with the relevant information to answer the question. The third solution and the least elegant is for the presenter to press the Escape key, which exists the slide show mode in PowerPoint, and manually locate the slide in question followed by a restart of the slide show. In all cases, the result is one which appears unprofessional.

== Serialisation versus hierarchy ==
Illustration of how a serial presentation restricts interactive navigation.

The process of collecting thoughts into chapters or sections has long existed and probably the best example of the provision of a more interactive content delivery mechanism is a modern website where content is freely navigated by the visitor to the site via a structured hierarchy. In this context, many pages, often exceeding hundreds or even thousands, are served by a web server but a user only ever retrieves and reads those pages that he/she is interested in during a particular visiting session. Intuitive navigation following the three-click rule provides multi-level structuring of the content which enables users to rapidly locate the content of interest.

== Tree structured PowerPoint ==
Illustration of how a hierarchical layer can benefit flexible presentation navigation.

An ActivePrez package adds a layer of interactive navigation to the PowerPoint file structure that in turn presents the user with a navigable in-slide menu bar system comprising a context sensitive user interface. By providing such a layer, the presenter is able to quickly jump from one part of the presentation to another, even if the destination slide is not contiguous to the source slide. This is of particular use when presentation material is created by one person but presented or interacted with by one or more others. An example of such a scenario of unfamiliarity is a Marketing communications team providing a presentation to a global sales team who then present to clients or prospects and hence the presenter is not familiar with the content once he/she starts the slide show.

== Versions ==
In the original release, ActivePresentation Designer consisted of an open software architecture that comprises two main components; the application and a set of templates. ActivePresentation Designer is the application used by presentation authors to create and edit the active content of a PowerPoint presentation. ActivePresentation Templates are the included files that provide the style for a menu bar. Additional templates could be written by VBA or VB developers by following the modular structure of the template architecture.

However, when Microsoft launched their 64 bit version of Microsoft Office, some of the key controls used by ActivePresentation Designer were not upgraded to be 64 bit compatible. This led to the need to redesign the product from the ground up and ActivePRez was released on 1 April 2014. The new version not only added compatibility for 64 bit versions of PowerPoint but also added a number of new features including user definable templates (without code), links to Custom Shows, files and URLs plus a Wizard to quickly generate menus from and existing presentation.

- 2015, May : ActivePrez 1.17
- 2014, April : ActivePrez 1.0
- 2010 : ActivePresentation Designer 1.0

== File formats ==
ActivePresentation
- Filename extension: .ppt, .pptx, .pps, .ppsx, .pptm, .ppsm, .apt, .aptm
- Internet media type: application/vnd.ms-powerpoint
- Uniform Type Identifier (UTI): com.microsoft.powerpoint.ppt
- Developed by: YOUpresent
- Type of format: Presentation

Since ActivePrez content is contained as standard shape objects within the existing PowerPoint file formats, there are no specific file format associations with an PowerPoint file created with ActivePrez and the formats supported are therefore a subset of those provided in the PowerPoint application software.

== Compatibility ==
ActivePrez replaced ActivePresentation Designer on 1 April 2014 and is compatible with Microsoft Office PowerPoint 2007 and 64 and 32 bit versions of Microsoft Office PowerPoint 2010, 2013 and later on Windows 7, 8 and later.

== See also ==
=== General ===
- PPT format
- Slideshow
- Death by Powerpoint
- PowerPoint hell
- Microsoft PowerPoint Viewer

=== Hierarchical PowerPoint Demonstration ===
- Free example presentations
