= Erdős–Bacon number =

Closeness of someone's association with mathematician Paul Erdős and actor Kevin Bacon

A person's Erdős–Bacon number is the sum of their Erdős number—which measures the "collaborative distance" in authoring academic papers between that person and Hungarian mathematician Paul Erdős—and their Bacon number—which represents the number of links, through roles in films, by which the person is separated from American actor Kevin Bacon. The lower the number, the closer a person is to Erdős and Bacon, which reflects a small world phenomenon in academia and entertainment. The lowest possible achievable Erdős–Bacon number is 2, but had Paul Erdős and Kevin Bacon both co-authored a paper and appeared in a film together, they each would have had a Erdős–Bacon of 1.

To have a defined Erdős–Bacon number, it is necessary to have both appeared in a film and co-authored an academic paper, although this in and of itself is not sufficient as one's co-authors must have a known chain leading to Paul Erdős, and one's film must have actors eventually leading to Kevin Bacon.

== Academic scientists ==
=== 3 ===
Mathematician Daniel Kleitman has an Erdős–Bacon number of 3. He co-authored papers with Erdős and has a Bacon number of 2 via his appearance as an extra in Good Will Hunting, with Minnie Driver; Driver and Bacon appeared together in Sleepers.

=== 4 ===
Physicist Nicholas Metropolis has an Erdős number of 2, and also a Bacon number of 2 via the Woody Allen film Husbands and Wives, giving him an Erdős–Bacon number of 4.

Paul Erdős himself has an Erdős number of 0, and a Bacon number of 4, since he appeared in a documentary about his life, N Is a Number: A Portrait of Paul Erdős, in which Tomasz Luczak appeared, who has a Bacon number of 3, giving Erdős an Erdős–Bacon number of 4.

Mathematician Dave Bayer has an Erdős number of 2, and also a Bacon number of 2 via the movie A Beautiful Mind, in which Rance Howard appeared, who has a Bacon number of 1 via the movie Apollo 13.

=== 5 ===
Mathematician Jordan Ellenberg appeared in the film Gifted with Octavia Spencer, who was in Beauty Shop with Bacon. Ellenberg also has an Erdős number of 3 via Christopher Skinner and Andrew Odlyzko.

Mathematician Dror Bar-Natan appeared in an episode of the show Horizon with Dilly Barlow, giving him a Bacon number of 3. He also collaborated with Brendan McKay, giving him an Erdős number of 2, and thus an Erdős–Bacon number of 5.

Electrical and Computer Engineer Robert J. Marks appeared in the movie Expelled: No Intelligence Allowed starring Ben Stein who appeared in the movie Planes, Trains and Automobiles with Kevin Bacon. His Bacon number is 2. Marks coauthored with Donald Wunsch. Wunsch published with Frank Harary who published with Erdős giving Marks an Erdös number of 3 and an Erdös-Bacon number of 5.

=== 6 ===
Metropolis and Richard Feynman both worked on the Manhattan Project at Los Alamos Laboratory. Via Metropolis, Feynman has an Erdős number of 3 and, from having appeared in the film Anti-Clock alongside Tony Tang, Feynman also has a Bacon number of 3. Richard Feynman thus has an Erdős–Bacon number of 6.

Theoretical physicist Stephen Hawking has an Erdős–Bacon number of 6: his Bacon number of 2 (via his appearance alongside John Cleese in Monty Python Live (Mostly), who acted alongside Kevin Bacon in The Big Picture) is lower than his Erdős number of 4.

Linguist Noam Chomsky has an Erdős number of 4, and he has a Bacon number of 2, having co-starred with Danny Glover in the 2005 documentary The Peace!, giving him a combined Erdős–Bacon number of 6.

Mathematician Ray Solomonoff, the inventor of algorithmic probability, has an Erdős number of 3 and also appeared in the Steven Wright film One Soldier; Wright's Bacon number of 2 gives Solomonoff a Bacon number of 3 and an Erdős–Bacon number of 6.

Astrophysicist Neil deGrasse Tyson has an Erdős–Bacon number of 6, as documented on his Wikipedia page.

=== 7 ===
Scientist Carl Sagan has an Erdős–Bacon number of 7. He has an Erdős number of 4, and a Bacon number of 3, through appearing in The Earth Day Special with Candice Bergen.

=== 8 ===
Mathematician Hannah Fry has an Erdős–Bacon number of 8. Fry appeared in Finding Father Christmas with Lenny Rush who has a Bacon number of 2. Fry has an Erdős number of 5 through her mathematics research

== Actors ==
=== 4 ===
Canadian actor Albert M. Chan has Erdős–Bacon number of 4. He co-authored a peer-reviewed paper on orthogonal frequency-division multiplexing, giving him an Erdős number of 3. Chan appeared alongside Kevin Bacon in Patriots Day, giving him a Bacon number of 1.

=== 6 ===
American actress Danica McKellar, who played Winnie Cooper in The Wonder Years, has an Erdős–Bacon number of 6. While an undergraduate at the University of California, Los Angeles, McKellar coauthored a mathematics paper with Lincoln Chayes, who via his wife Jennifer Tour Chayes has an Erdős number of 3, giving McKellar one of 4. Having worked with Margaret Easley, McKellar has a Bacon number of 2.

British actor Colin Firth has an Erdős–Bacon number of 6. Firth is credited as co-author of a neuroscience paper, "Political Orientations Are Correlated with Brain Structure in Young Adults", after he suggested on BBC Radio 4 that such a study could be done. Another author of that paper, Geraint Rees, has an Erdős number of 4, which gives Firth an Erdős number of 5. Firth's Bacon number of 1 is due to his appearance in Where the Truth Lies.

=== 7 ===
Israeli-American actress Natalie Portman has an Erdős–Bacon number of 7. She collaborated (using her birth name, Natalie Hershlag) with Abigail A. Baird, who has a collaboration path leading to Joseph Gillis, who has an Erdős number of 1, giving Portman an Erdős number of 5. Portman appeared in A Powerful Noise Live (2009) with Sarah Michelle Gellar, who appeared in The Air I Breathe (2007) with Bacon, giving Portman a Bacon number of 2.

American actress Kristen Stewart has an Erdős–Bacon number of 7; she is credited as a co-author on an artificial intelligence paper that was written after a technique was used for her short film Come Swim, giving her an Erdős number of 5, and she co-starred with Michael Sheen in Twilight, who co-starred with Bacon in Frost/Nixon, giving her a Bacon number of 2.

American actor and writer Wil Wheaton has an Erdős–Bacon number of 7. He was in She's Having a Baby with Bacon, giving him a Bacon number of 1. Stephen Hawking, who has a Erdős number of 4, made a cameo appearance on the series The Big Bang Theory in season 5. While not appearing in the same episode, Wheaton had a reoccurring role and through other cast members would have an Erdős number of 6.

== Others ==
=== 5 ===
Sergey Brin has an Erdős number of 3 through papers with Jeffrey Ullman and Ronald Graham, and he has two cameos in the 2013 comedy The Internship, leading to a Bacon number of 2 via Rose Byrne and consequently an Erdős–Bacon number of 5.

=== 6 ===
Bill Gates has an Erdős number of 4 and in 1987 he participated in a short mockumentary titled Citizen Steve about Steven Spielberg, where he co-starred with Whoopi Goldberg, giving him a Bacon number of 2 and consequently an Erdős–Bacon number of 6.
