= I Have a Pony =

Live album by Steven Wright
- Released: 1985
- Genre: Stand-up comedy
- Length: 41:42
- Label: Warner Bros. Records
- Producer: William E. McEuen

Steven Wright chronology
I Have a Pony (1985)	I Still Have a Pony (2007)

Professional ratings
Review scores
Source	Rating
Allmusic	4/5 stars

I Have a Pony is the debut comedy album by American stand-up comedian Steven Wright, released in 1985. It was recorded at Wolfgang's in San Francisco and Park West in Chicago. I Have a Pony is 40 minutes long and consists entirely of Wright's typical style of one-line jokes.

Despite his ongoing career, it was his only album release for many years: "When I made that album, I noticed that the material on it became so well known that I couldn't really perform it anymore." On September 25, 2007, nearly 22 years later, Wright released a follow-up titled I Still Have a Pony (a CD release of the material from When The Leaves Blow Away).

The album peaked at number 194 on the Billboard 200. It was nominated for the Grammy Award for Best Comedy Album in 1987.

== Track listing ==
1. "Introduction" - 4:14
2. "Ants" - 4:42
3. "Hitchhiking" - 2:13
4. "Ice" - 2:28
5. "Dog Stay" - 3:27
6. "Rachel" - 4:50
7. "7's and the Museum" - 4:01
8. "Water" - 3:06
9. "Jiggs Casey" - 3:03
10. "Cross Country" - 2:15
11. "Book Store" - 1:25
12. "Winny" - 1:28
13. "Apt." - 2:08
14. "Babies and Skiing" - 2:22
