= The Appointments of Dennis Jennings =

1988 film by Dean Parisot

- Directed by: Dean Parisot
- Written by: Mike Armstrong; Steven Wright
- Produced by: Dean Parisot; Steven Wright
- Starring: Steven Wright; Rowan Atkinson; Laurie Metcalf
- Cinematography: Frank Prinzi
- Edited by: Peter Frank
- Production company: Schooner Productions
- Distributed by: HBO
- Release date: September 7, 1988 (Boston Film Festival)
- Running time: 29 minutes
- Country: United States
- Language: English

The Appointments of Dennis Jennings is a 1988 American short TV comedy film directed by Dean Parisot and starring Steven Wright and Rowan Atkinson. It was written by Mike Armstrong and Wright.

The film won the Oscar for Best Live Action Short Film at the 61st Academy Awards in 1989.

== Plot ==
Dennis Jennings is an introvert, showing symptoms of obsessive-compulsive disorder, anxiety, paranoia, and a troubled youth. He works as a waiter and has an indifferent girlfriend, Emma, who only seems to patronize him. The "appointments" are with his psychiatrist, who is annoyed with him and uninterested in what he has to say. After finding his doctor sharing Dennis's intimate secrets with a group of fellow psychiatrists at a bar, and then finding that his girlfriend is cheating on him with the doctor, Dennis decides he has had enough. He hunts the doctor, shoots him, and goes to jail afterwards.

== Cast ==
- Steven Wright as Dennis Jennings
- Rowan Atkinson as Dr. Schooner
- Laurie Metcalf as Emma
- Peter Maloney as Dr. Wilson
- Martha Gehman as Lisa
- David Hyde Pierce as businessman (credit: David Pierce)
- Christopher Durang as laughing psychiatrist
- Dana Ivey as newscaster
- Joe Grifasi as bartender
- Mike Starr as doorman
- Bill McCutcheon as man on TV
- Rochelle Oliver as woman on TV

== Reception ==
The Hollywood Reporter wrote: "The Appointments of Dennis Jennings is the kind of TV comedy that wins precisely because of its ability to make the odd and the unexpected the resignedly accepted, a sort of Alice through the looking-glass perceived through an end heretofore unknown."

After winning the Academy Award for Best Live Action Short Film at the 61st Academy Awards, Wright joked in his acceptance speech: "This was for the Short Film category, and we're really glad we cut out the other sixty minutes."
