= When the Leaves Blow Away =

Stand-up comedy television special by Steven Wright

When The Leaves Blow Away is a stand-up comedy television special by Steven Wright, broadcast by Comedy Central in 2006. The program was released on DVD on April 24, 2007.

The audio from the special was released on Comedy Central Records as I Still Have a Pony, in reference to Wright's previous comedy album, I Have a Pony. I Still Have a Pony was nominated for a Grammy Award in 2007 but lost to The Distant Future by Flight of the Conchords.
