= Six Degrees of Martina McBride =

Six Degrees of Martina McBride was a two-hour TV special/pilot that aired on July 30, 2007 on ABC in which six aspiring country singers from America's smallest towns tried to connect themselves to Martina McBride in six or fewer points of human connection. The program tested the "six degrees of separation" phenomenon. Those who made it from "Nowhere to Nashville to New York" got both a studio session with McBride and a shot at a record deal with Sony BMG. ABC did not pick up the pilot as a series.

== Production ==
The show also told McBride's own unique story of six degrees, which helped advance her from selling T-shirts for Garth Brooks, to opening for him on stage, to becoming one of country-and-western music's biggest superstars. Rodney Atkins, Ray Benson, Little Big Town, and Miranda Lambert appeared in the show.

The pilot program was produced for the ABC Television Network by the production team of ABC News Primetime, and was the first of its kind. On July 27, 2007, executive producer David Sloan described the show as a "hybrid" to the Chicago Tribune: "ABC News is looking for new ways of interacting and engaging with the viewer. This represents that effort."

The show aired on July 30, 2007 as an entire season compressed into one two-hour broadcast.

DeAnne Roberts won the final competition. Thomas Stratton and Kristina Craig were the other two finalists. ABC-TV did not pick up the program's series option.

On August 1, 2007, Sony BMG released all three finalists' singles digitally on iTunes.

== Cast and crew ==
The show was hosted by Jay Schadler.

=== Contestants ===
The six contestants were:

- Mark Jaspers
- Thomas Stratton
- Dani Riker
- Kristina Marie Craig
- DeAnne Roberts
- Ken Swick

=== Judges ===
The contestants faced three judges:

- Miranda Lambert
- Ray Benson
- Beverly Keel
