= Jewish geography =

Game amongst global Jewish community

Jewish geography is a popular game sometimes played when Jews meet each other for the first time and try to identify people they know in common. The game has become something of an informal social custom in the Jewish community, and it is often surprisingly easy for strangers who play it to discover mutual acquaintances and establish instant context and connection.

American social historian Etan Diamond notes that non-Jews "often find it astonishing that such links are made so easily, but given both the relative smallness of the Jewish community—and the even smaller size of the Orthodox Jewish community—and the extensive overlapping social circles within these communities, it should not surprise too much". He gives an example Jewish geography conversation of "You're from [insert name of city here]? Do you know [insert person's name here]?" getting a response of "Sure, he sits behind my uncle in synagogue" or "I met her once at a youth group convention".

== Similar games ==
An Israeli version of the game, pitsuchim, has been a common pastime among young Israeli backpackers traveling the world, taking its name from a 1980s television quiz show.

Another similar social game called "The rule of intertwined Datis" (Hebrew for religious orthodox Jews) is used by Religious Zionist Orthodox Jews, and a movie mocking the game called by that name has been produced by students of the Ma'ale school for video and media.

The Jewish geography game can be seen as a form of testing the small-world experiment, Stanley Milgram's research into the probability that two randomly selected people would know each other.

== Origins ==
The origins of "Jewish geography" are unclear. Sarah Benor, a linguist and professor of Jewish Studies at Hebrew Union College has noted "Sometimes that kind of thing is really impossible to find."

== Analysis ==
The term "Jewish geography" not only functions as the name of the game, but also describes the unique smallness and closeness of the worldwide Jewish population. The Jewish population's "Jewish geography," therefore, is what makes the game possible and lets Jews from different cities, regions, and countries easily discover people they know in common.

Both the game and the concept are Jewish-specific examples of the six degrees of separation theory proposed by Hungarian writer Frigyes Karinthy in 1929 and the small world phenomenon hypothesized by social scientist Stanley Milgram in 1967.

While the accuracy of these theories have been questioned by some, few Jews doubt the validity of "Jewish geography," having observed its connective power firsthand.

== See also ==
- Six degrees of separation
