= I Still Have a Pony =

Live album by Steven Wright
- Released: 2007
- Genre: Stand-up comedy
- Length: 41:42
- Label: Comedy Central Records
- Producer: Jack Vaughn Jr.

Steven Wright chronology
I Have a Pony (1985)	I Still Have a Pony (2007)

Professional ratings
Review scores
Source	Rating
Allmusic	4/5 stars

I Still Have a Pony is the second live comedy album by Steven Wright. The title is a play on that of Wright's previous album I Have a Pony, which was released 22 years before. The album contains the audio from his Comedy Central standup comedy special When the Leaves Blow Away. Wright claims to have come back with a new album and special because "the people in college now weren't even born or were like five years old when I did my last HBO special."

Like its predecessor, the album was nominated for the Grammy Award for Best Comedy Album.

== Track listing ==
1. "Quote" - 4:56
2. "I Met This Woman" - 4:06
3. "The Store" - 4:18
4. "Camera" - 4:23
5. "The Kitten Song" - 1:08
6. "Twin" - 3:12
7. "Monopoly" - 3:33
8. "Hitchhiker" - 3:15
9. "Planetarium" - 2:49
10. "My Grandfather" - 3:01
11. "Shopping Carts" - 2:16
12. "The Mumbles Song" - 2:02
13. "Friends of Mine Song" - 3:11
