= Co-stardom network =

In social network analysis, the co-stardom network represents the collaboration graph of film actors i.e. movie stars. The co-stardom network can be represented by an undirected graph. Nodes correspond to the movie star actors and two nodes are linked if they co-starred (performed) in the same movie. The links are un-directed, and can be weighted or not depending on the goals of study. If the number of times two actors appeared in a movie is needed, links are assigned weights. Initially, the network was found to have a small-world property. Afterwards, it was discovered that more precisely it exhibits a scale-free (power-law) behavior.

The co-stardom network can also be represented by a bipartite graph where nodes are of two types: actors and movies. Links connect different types of nodes (i.e. actors to movies) if they have a relationship (actors in a movie).

The parlor game of Six Degrees of Kevin Bacon involves finding paths in this network from specified actors to Kevin Bacon.

== Network representation ==
In order to represent any network, it is necessary to characterize the properties of the corresponding graph of nodes and links. Studies on the collaboration network of movie actors have been described in literature such as the work done by Watts and Strogatz (1998) and Barabási and Albert in 1999 and 2000. The general characteristics are described below.

- According to Watts and Strogatz, the movie-actor network indicated the following characteristics showing a small-world property of the underlying network:

Size: 225 226
Average degree: 61
Average path length: 3.65
Average clustering coefficient: 0.79

Compared to a random graph of the same size and average degree, the average path length is close in value. However, the clustering coefficient is much higher for the movie actor network.

- The network characteristics and scaling exponents given by Barabási and Albert, indicates the scale-free behavior:

Size: 212 250
Average degree(connectivity): 28.78
Clustering coefficient: 0.79

The network fits a scale-free degree distribution p(k) ~ k^{−γ_{actor}}, with an exponent γ_{actor} = 2.3 ± 0.1.

- According to Newman, Strogatz and Watts, the movie actor network can be described by a bipartite graph. Contrary to the studies described previously, they study a bipartite graph with nodes of two types: movies and actors, with links, with edges linking an actor to a movie they appear in. Co-stars are both linked to the same movie they appear in. Therefore, the collaboration graph of film actors can be constructed using a transformation matrix of the bipartite graph interaction matrix.

== Data collection ==
The Internet Movie Database IMDB represents one of the largest internet sources for movies/actors data, and it is where most of the datasets are collected to study the collaboration network of co-star actors. IMDB facilitates the ability to collect data for very specific and variable types of network. For example, a network can be constructed using data from all the horror movies made within the 2020–2021 timeframe and only picking the top three co-stars in each movie.
