= Bob Lazarus =

American comedian and actor (1956–2009)

- Born: January 4, 1956
- Died: January 4, 2009 (aged 53)
- Occupation(s): Film actor, comedian

Bob Lazarus (January 4, 1956 – January 4, 2009) was an American stand-up comedian and film actor.

Lazarus graduated from the University of Massachusetts Amherst.

He appeared on Showtime and Comedy Central. Lazarus had toured the United States with Steven Wright. He also appeared with Robin Williams, Jay Leno, Rob Schneider, Denis Leary, Judy Tenuta, Sinbad, Paula Poundstone and Ray Romano.

== Personal life ==
Lazarus was married and had a daughter. He lived in Massachusetts when not touring.

Lazarus died of leukemia on January 4, 2009, at Dana-Farber/Brigham towers, on his 53rd birthday.
