= Erdős number =

Degrees of separation from Paul Erdős

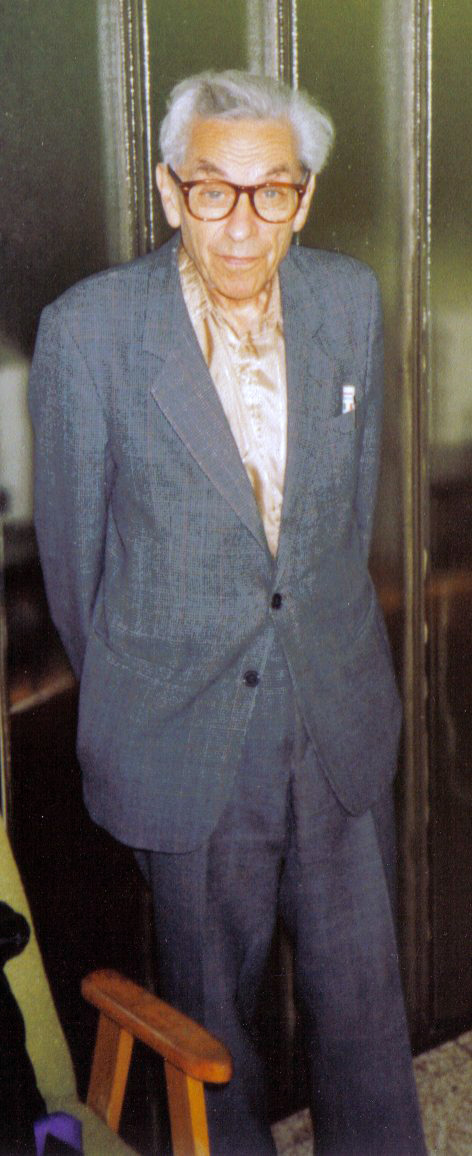
Paul Erdős in 1992

The Erdős number (Hungarian: [ˈɛrdøːʃ]) describes the "collaborative distance" between mathematician Paul Erdős and another person, measured by joint authorship of mathematical papers. The same principle has been applied in other fields.

== Overview ==
Paul Erdős (1913–1996) was an influential Hungarian mathematician who, in the latter part of his life, spent a great deal of time writing papers with a large number of colleagues—more than 500—working on solutions to outstanding mathematical problems. He published more papers during his lifetime (at least 1,525) than any other mathematician in history. (Leonhard Euler published more total pages of mathematics but fewer separate papers: about 800.) Erdős spent most of his career with no permanent home or job. He traveled with everything he owned in two suitcases, and would visit mathematicians with whom he wanted to collaborate, often unexpectedly, and expect to stay with them.

The idea of the Erdős number was originally created by the mathematician's friends as a tribute to his enormous output. Later it gained prominence as a tool to study how mathematicians cooperate to find answers to unsolved problems. Several projects are devoted to studying connectivity among researchers, using the Erdős number as a proxy. For example, Erdős collaboration graphs can tell us how authors cluster, how the number of co-authors per paper evolves over time, or how new theories propagate.

Several studies have shown that leading mathematicians tend to have particularly low Erdős numbers. The median Erdős number of Fields Medalists is 3. Only 7,097 (about 5% of mathematicians with a collaboration path) have an Erdős number of 2 or lower. As time passes, the lowest Erdős number that can still be achieved will necessarily increase, as mathematicians with low Erdős numbers die and become unavailable for collaboration. Still, historical figures can have low Erdős numbers. For example, renowned Indian mathematician Srinivasa Ramanujan has an Erdős number of only 3 (through G. H. Hardy, Erdős number 2), even though Paul Erdős was only 7 years old when Ramanujan died.

== Definition and application in mathematics ==
If Alice collaborates with Paul Erdős on one paper, and with Bob on another, but Bob never collaborates with Erdős directly, then Alice is given an Erdős number of 1 and Bob is given an Erdős number of 2, as he is two steps from Erdős.

To be assigned an Erdős number, someone must be a coauthor of a research paper with another person who has a finite Erdős number. Paul Erdős himself is assigned an Erdős number of zero. A certain author's Erdős number is one greater than the lowest Erdős number of any of their collaborators; for example, an author who has coauthored a publication with Erdős would have an Erdős number of 1. The American Mathematical Society provides a free online tool to determine the collaboration distance between two mathematical authors listed in the Mathematical Reviews catalogue.

Erdős wrote around 1,500 mathematical articles in his lifetime, mostly co-written. He had 509 direct collaborators; these are the people with Erdős number 1. The people who have collaborated with them (but not with Erdős himself) have an Erdős number of 2 (13,782 people as of 10 August 2025), those who have collaborated with people who have an Erdős number of 2 (but not with Erdős or anyone with an Erdős number of 1) have an Erdős number of 3, and so forth. A person with no such coauthorship chain connecting to Erdős has an Erdős number of infinity (or an undefined one). Since the death of Paul Erdős, the lowest Erdős number that a new researcher can obtain is 2.

There is room for ambiguity over what constitutes a link between two authors. The American Mathematical Society collaboration distance calculator uses data from Mathematical Reviews, which includes most mathematics journals but covers other subjects only in a limited way, and which also includes some non-research publications. The Erdős Number Project web site says:

... One drawback of the MR system is that it considers all jointly authored works as providing legitimate links, even articles such as obituaries, which are not really joint research. ...

It also says:

... Our criterion for inclusion of an edge between vertices u and v is some research collaboration between them resulting in a published work. Any number of additional co-authors is permitted,...

but excludes non-research publications such as elementary textbooks, joint editorships, obituaries, and the like. The "Erdős number of the second kind" restricts assignment of Erdős numbers to papers with only two collaborators.

The Erdős number was most likely first defined in print by Casper Goffman, an analyst whose own Erdős number is 2. Goffman published his observations about Erdős' prolific collaboration in a 1969 article entitled "And what is your Erdős number?" See also some comments in an obituary by Michael Golomb.

The median Erdős number among Fields medalists is as low as 3. Fields medalists with Erdős number 2 include Atle Selberg, Kunihiko Kodaira, Klaus Roth, Alan Baker, Enrico Bombieri, David Mumford, Charles Fefferman, William Thurston, Shing-Tung Yau, Jean Bourgain, Richard Borcherds, Manjul Bhargava, Jean-Pierre Serre and Terence Tao. There are no Fields medalists with Erdős number 1; however, Endre Szemerédi is an Abel Prize Laureate with Erdős number 1.

== Most frequent Erdős collaborators ==
While Erdős collaborated with hundreds of co-authors, there were some individuals with whom he co-authored dozens of papers. This is a list of the ten persons who most frequently co-authored with Erdős and their number of papers co-authored with Erdős, i.e., their number of collaborations.

Co-author	Number of collaborations
András Sárközy	62
András Hajnal	56
Ralph Faudree	50
Richard Schelp	42
Cecil C. Rousseau	35
Vera T. Sós	35
Alfréd Rényi	32
Pál Turán	30
Endre Szemerédi	29
Ronald Graham	28

== Related fields ==
As of 2022, all Fields medalists have a finite Erdős number, with values that range between 2 and 6, and a median of 3. In contrast, the median Erdős number across all mathematicians (with a finite Erdős number) is 5, with an extreme value of 13. The table below summarizes the Erdős number statistics for Nobel prize laureates in Physics, Chemistry, Medicine, and Economics. The first column counts the number of laureates. The second column counts the number of winners with a finite Erdős number. The third column is the percentage of winners with a finite Erdős number. The remaining columns report the minimum, maximum, average, and median Erdős numbers among those laureates.

Statistics on Mathematical Collaboration, 1903–2016
	#Laureates	#Erdős	%Erdős	Min	Max	Average	Median
Fields Medal	56	56	100.0%	2	6	3.36	3
Nobel Economics	76	47	61.84%	2	8	4.11	4
Nobel Chemistry	172	42	24.42%	3	10	5.48	5
Nobel Medicine	210	58	27.62%	3	12	5.50	5
Nobel Physics	200	159	79.50%	2	12	5.63	5

=== Physics ===
Among the Nobel Prize laureates in Physics, Albert Einstein and Sheldon Glashow have an Erdős number of 2. Nobel Laureates with an Erdős number of 3 include Enrico Fermi, Otto Stern, Wolfgang Pauli, Max Born, Willis E. Lamb, Eugene Wigner, Richard P. Feynman, Hans A. Bethe, Murray Gell-Mann, Abdus Salam, Steven Weinberg, Norman F. Ramsey, Frank Wilczek, David Wineland, and Giorgio Parisi. Fields Medal-winning physicist Ed Witten has an Erdős number of 3.

Angela Merkel, Chancellor of Germany from 2005 to 2021, has an Erdős number of at most 5.

=== Biology ===
Several prolific scientists working in genetics, biomedical engineering, and mathematical and computational biology have an Erdős number of 2. Among them are Zvia Agur, Joel E. Cohen, Eugene Koonin, Bruce Kristal, Eric Lander, Lior Pachter, and Temple F. Smith. Through collaborations with these authors, there are many biologists with an Erdős number of 3, and it has been argued that almost every author of a paper in the biological sciences can be linked to Erdős.

=== Finance and economics ===
There are at least two winners of the Nobel Prize in Economics with an Erdős number of 2: Harry M. Markowitz (1990) and Leonid Kantorovich (1975). Other financial mathematicians with Erdős number of 2 include David Donoho, Marc Yor, Henry McKean, Daniel Stroock, and Joseph Keller.

Nobel Prize laureates in Economics with an Erdős number of 3 include Kenneth J. Arrow (1972), Milton Friedman (1976), Herbert A. Simon (1978), Gerard Debreu (1983), John Forbes Nash, Jr. (1994), James Mirrlees (1996), Daniel McFadden (2000), Daniel Kahneman (2002), Robert J. Aumann (2005), Leonid Hurwicz (2007), Roger Myerson (2007), Alvin E. Roth (2012), and Lloyd S. Shapley (2012) and Jean Tirole (2014).

Some investment firms have been founded by mathematicians with low Erdős numbers, among them James B. Ax of Axcom Technologies, and James H. Simons of Renaissance Technologies, both with an Erdős number of 3.

=== Philosophy ===
Since the more formal versions of philosophy share reasoning with the basics of mathematics, these fields overlap considerably, and Erdős numbers are available for many philosophers. Philosophers John P. Burgess and Brian Skyrms have an Erdős number of 2. Jon Barwise and Joel David Hamkins, both with Erdős number 2, have also contributed extensively to philosophy, but are primarily described as mathematicians.

=== Law ===
Judge Richard Posner, having coauthored with Alvin E. Roth, has an Erdős number of at most 4. Roberto Mangabeira Unger, a politician, philosopher, and legal theorist who teaches at Harvard Law School, has an Erdős number of at most 4, having coauthored with Lee Smolin.

=== Engineering ===
Some fields of engineering, in particular communication theory and cryptography, make direct use of the discrete mathematics championed by Erdős. It is therefore not surprising that practitioners in these fields have low Erdős numbers. For example, Robert McEliece, a professor of electrical engineering at Caltech, had an Erdős number of 1, having collaborated with Erdős himself. Cryptographers Ron Rivest, Adi Shamir, and Leonard Adleman, inventors of the RSA cryptosystem, all have Erdős number 2.

=== Linguistics ===
The Romanian mathematician and computational linguist Solomon Marcus had an Erdős number of 1 for a paper in Acta Mathematica Hungarica that he co-authored with Erdős in 1957.

== Impact ==
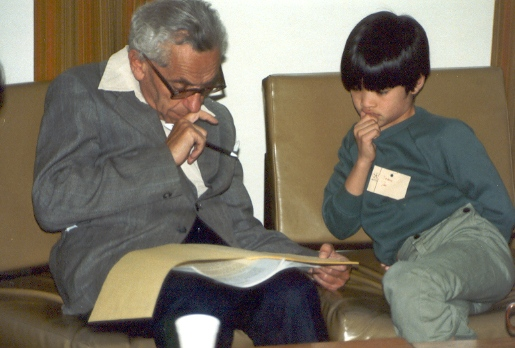
Paul Erdős in 1985 at the University of Adelaide teaching Terence Tao, who was then 10 years old.

Erdős numbers have been a part of the folklore of mathematicians throughout the world for many years. Among all working mathematicians at the turn of the millennium who have a finite Erdős number, the numbers range up to 15, the median is 5, and the mean is 4.65; almost everyone with a finite Erdős number has a number less than 8.

Due to the very high frequency of interdisciplinary collaboration in science today, very large numbers of non-mathematicians in many other fields of science also have finite Erdős numbers. For example, political scientist Steven Brams has an Erdős number of 2. In biomedical research, it is common for statisticians to be among the authors of publications, and many statisticians can be linked to Erdős via Persi Diaconis or Paul Deheuvels, who have Erdős numbers of 1, or John Tukey, who has an Erdős number of 2. Similarly, the prominent geneticist Eric Lander and the mathematician Daniel Kleitman have collaborated on papers, and since Kleitman has an Erdős number of 1, a large fraction of the genetics and genomics community can be linked via Lander and his numerous collaborators. Similarly, collaboration with Gustavus Simmons opened the door for Erdős numbers within the cryptographic research community, and many linguists have finite Erdős numbers, many due to chains of collaboration with such notable scholars as Noam Chomsky (Erdős number 4), William Labov (3), Mark Liberman (3), Geoffrey Pullum (3), or Ivan Sag (4). There are also connections with arts fields.

According to Alex Lopez-Ortiz, all the Fields and Nevanlinna Prize winners during the three cycles in 1986 to 1994 have Erdős numbers of at most 9.

Earlier mathematicians published fewer papers than modern ones, and more rarely published jointly written papers. The earliest person known to have a finite Erdős number is either Antoine Lavoisier (born 1743, Erdős number 13), Richard Dedekind (born 1831, Erdős number 7), or Ferdinand Georg Frobenius (born 1849, Erdős number 3), depending on the standard of publication eligibility.

Martin Tompa proposed a directed graph version of the Erdős number problem, by orienting edges of the collaboration graph from the alphabetically earlier author to the alphabetically later author and defining the monotone Erdős number of an author to be the length of a longest path from Erdős to the author in this directed graph. He finds a path of this type of length 12.

Also, Michael Barr suggests "rational Erdős numbers", generalizing the idea that a person who has written p joint papers with Erdős should be assigned Erdős number 1/p. From the collaboration multigraph of the second kind (although he also has a way to deal with the case of the first kind)—with one edge between two mathematicians for each joint paper they have produced—form an electrical network with a one-ohm resistor on each edge. The total resistance between two nodes tells how "close" these two nodes are.

It has been argued that "for an individual researcher, a measure such as Erdős number captures the structural properties of [the] network whereas the h-index captures the citation impact of the publications," and that "One can be easily convinced that ranking in coauthorship networks should take into account both measures to generate a realistic and acceptable ranking."

In 2004, William Tozier, a mathematician with an Erdős number of 4, auctioned off a co-authorship on eBay, hence providing the buyer with an Erdős number of 5. The winning bid of $1031 was posted by a Spanish mathematician, who refused to pay and only placed the bid to stop what he considered a mockery.

== Variations ==
A number of variations on the concept have been proposed, notably the Bacon number (as in the game Six Degrees of Kevin Bacon), connecting actors to the actor Kevin Bacon by a chain of joint appearances in films. It was created in 1994.

A small number of people are connected to both Erdős and Bacon and thus have an Erdős–Bacon number, the sum of the two. For example, the actress-mathematician Danica McKellar, best known for playing Winnie Cooper on the TV series The Wonder Years has an Erdős-Bacon number of 6: 4 from Erdös and 2 from Bacon.

The "Erdős–Bacon–Sabbath number" is the sum of the Erdős–Bacon number and the collaborative distance to the band Black Sabbath by singing in public. The physicist Stephen Hawking had an Erdős–Bacon–Sabbath number of 8, and the actress Natalie Portman has one of 11 (her Erdős number is 5).

In chess, the Morphy number measures a player's connection to Paul Morphy, widely considered the greatest chess player of his time and an unofficial World Chess Champion.

In go, the Shusaku number measures a player's connection to Hon'inbō Shūsaku, the strongest player of his time.

In video games, the Ryu number measures a video game character's connection to the Street Fighter character Ryu.

== See also ==
- Author-level metrics – Metrics of the bibliometric impact of individual authors
- Collaboration graph – Graph modeling collaboration in a social network
- List of people by Erdős number
- List of things named after Paul Erdős
- Scientometrics – Quantitative study of science
- Six degrees of separation – Concept of social inter-connectedness
- Small-world experiment – Experiments examining the average path length for social networks
- Small-world network – Graph where most nodes are reachable in a small number of steps
- Sociology of scientific knowledge – Study of science as a social activity
