= Three-click rule =

Unofficial web design rule

The three-click rule or three click rule is an unofficial web design rule concerning the design of website navigation. It suggests that a user of a website should be able to find any information with no more than three mouse clicks. It is based on the belief that users of a site will become frustrated and often leave if they cannot find the information within the three clicks.

One of the earliest mentions of the three click rule comes from Jeffrey Zeldman, who wrote in Taking Your Talent to the Web (2001), that the Three-Click Rule is "based on the way people use the Web" and "the rule can help you create sites with intuitive, logical hierarchical structures". Although there is little analytical evidence that this is the case, it is a commonly held belief amongst designers that the rule is part of a good system of navigation. Critics of the rule suggest that the number of clicks is not as important as the success of the clicks or information sent.

The principle of the “three-click rule” is often used to test the user-friendliness of a program or application. The implementation of the rule of three clicks is evident in the design of modern day operating systems and applications where users can complete most tasks from starting the computer or app and completing a desired task in less than three clicks.

In 2024, the Federal Trade Commission announced a "click-to-cancel" rule that would online sellers to simplify the process for users to cancel services. This involved both transparent communication around cancellation and simplifying the user experience of canceling an online service.

== Criticism ==
The three click rule has been challenged by usability test results, which have shown that the number of clicks needed to access the desired information affects neither user satisfaction, nor success rate.

In eCommerce websites, the rule can often be detrimental as in order to adhere to the rule, products on offer to customers must be grouped into categories that are far too large to be easily browsed.

== See also ==
- Six degrees of separation
