= Karinthy =

Karinthy (Hungarian: karint(h)·i, means "from Carinthia, Carinthian"; corresponds to German: Kärntner, Slovene: Koroški) may refer to:

- Frigyes Karinthy - Hungarian writer and translator
  - Ferenc Karinthy - Hungarian writer and translator, son of Frigyes Karinthy
    - Márton Karinthy - Hungarian writer and theatre director, son of Ferenc Karinthy
  - Gábor Karinthy - Hungarian poet, son of Frigyes Karinthy

== See also ==
- Carantania
