= Steven Wright =

American comedian (born 1955)

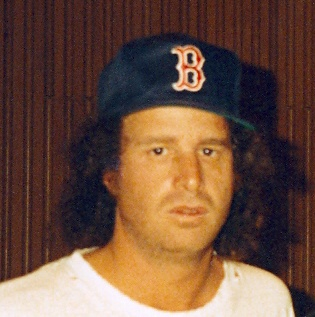
- Wright in 1994
- Born: Steven Alexander Wright; December 6, 1955 (age 70); Cambridge, Massachusetts, U.S.

Comedy career
- Years active: 1978–present
- Medium: Stand-up; film; television
- Genres: Anti-humor; deadpan; one-liners; wit/word play; non sequitur; observational comedy; musical comedy
- Website: www.stevenwright.com

Steven Alexander Wright (born December 6, 1955) is an American stand-up comedian, actor, writer and film producer. He is known for his distinctive lethargic voice and slow, deadpan delivery of ironic, philosophical and sometimes nonsensical jokes, paraprosdokians, non sequiturs, anti-humor, and one-liners with contrived situations.

Wright was ranked as the 15th Greatest Comedian by Rolling Stone in its 2017 list of the 50 Greatest Stand-up Comics. His accolades include the Academy Award for Best Live Action Short Film for starring in, writing, and producing the short film The Appointments of Dennis Jennings (1988) and two Primetime Emmy Awards nominations as a producer of Louie (2010–2015). He had a supporting role as Leon in the Peabody Award–winning tragicomedy web series Horace and Pete.

== Early life, family and education ==
Wright was born at Mount Auburn Hospital in Cambridge, Massachusetts, and grew up in Burlington, Massachusetts, one of four children of Lucille "Dolly" (née Lomano) and Alexander K. Wright. He was raised Catholic. His mother was Italian American, and his father of Scottish descent. Wright's father worked as an electronics technician who "tested a lot of stuff" for NASA during the Apollo space program. When that program ended, he worked as a truck driver.

Wright attended Middlesex Community College in Bedford, Massachusetts, for two years to earn his associate degree, then continued his education at Emerson College. He graduated from Emerson in 1978.

== Career ==
Wright began performing stand-up comedy in 1979 at the Comedy Connection in Boston. Wright cites stand-up comic George Carlin and director and former stand-up comic Woody Allen as comedic influences. In 1982 Peter Lassally, executive producer of NBC's The Tonight Show Starring Johnny Carson, saw Wright performing on a bill with other local comics at the Ding Ho comedy club in Cambridge, a venue Wright described as "half Chinese restaurant and half comedy club. It was a pretty weird place." Lassally booked Wright on The Tonight Show, and Wright so impressed host Johnny Carson and the studio audience that less than a week later he was invited to appear on the show again.

=== Stand-up success ===
Wright's 1985 comedy album I Have a Pony was released on Warner Bros. Records, received critical acclaim and was nominated for the Grammy Award for Best Comedy Album. The album's success landed him an HBO special, in the On Location: series, taped at Wolfgang's in San Francisco. It was broadcast as A Steven Wright Special.

By then Wright had developed a new brand of extreme deadpan, and was building a cultlike following. His onstage persona was characterized by an aura of obscurity and his penchant for non sequiturs added to his mystique. The performance became one of HBO's longest-running and most requested comedy specials and propelled him to great success on the college-arena concert circuit.

=== Continued success beyond stand-up ===
In 1989 Wright and fellow producer Dean Parisot won an Academy Award for their 30-minute short film The Appointments of Dennis Jennings, directed by Parisot, written by Mike Armstrong and Wright, and starring Wright and Rowan Atkinson. Upon accepting the Oscar, Wright said, "We're really glad that we cut out the other sixty minutes." In 1992 Wright had a recurring role on the television sitcom Mad About You. He also supplied the voice of the radio DJ in writer-director Quentin Tarantino's film Reservoir Dogs that year. "Dean Parisot's wife Sally Menke is Quentin Tarantino's [film] editor, so when she was editing the movie and it was getting down toward the end where they didn't have the radio DJ yet, she thought of me and told Quentin and he liked the idea," Wright explained in 2009.

In 1995 Wright provided voiceover work for TBS's Disaster Area cartoon block.

Numerous lists of jokes attributed to Wright circulate on the Internet, sometimes of dubious origin. Wright has said, "Someone showed me a site, and half of it that said I wrote it, I didn't write. Recently, I saw one, and I didn't write any of it. What's disturbing is that with a few of these jokes, I wish I had thought of them. A giant amount of them, I'm embarrassed that people think I thought of them because some are really bad."

After his 1990 comedy special Wicker Chairs and Gravity, Wright continued to do stand-up performances, but these were largely absent from television, and he only occasionally made guest spots on late-night talk shows. In 1999 he wrote and directed the 30-minute short One Soldier, saying it's "about a soldier who was in the Civil War, right after the war, with all these existentialist thoughts and wondering if there is a God and all that stuff."

In May 2000 Wright and other Ding Ho alumni, including Lenny Clarke, Barry Crimmins, Steve Sweeney, Bill Sohonage and Jimmy Tingle, appeared at a reunion benefit for comic Bob Lazarus, who was diagnosed with leukemia.

In 2006 Wright produced his first stand-up special in 16 years, Steven Wright: When the Leaves Blow Away, originally aired on Comedy Central on October 21, 2006. On September 25, 2007, Wright released his second album, I Still Have a Pony, a CD release of the material from When The Leaves Blow Away. It was nominated for the Grammy Award for Best Comedy Album.

Beginning in 2008 Wright occasionally appeared on The Late Late Show with Craig Ferguson as a visiting celebrity, often dropping by to help with the fan-mail segment. He joined a small cadre of Hollywood comedy celebrities who supported the show.

== Awards and honors ==
Wright was awarded an Oscar in 1989 for Best Short Live-Action Film for The Appointments of Dennis Jennings, which he co-wrote (with Michael Armstrong) and starred in. He received two Emmy Award nominations as part of the producing team of Louie, first in 2014 and again in 2015.

On December 15, 2008, Wright became the first inductee to the Boston Comedy Hall of Fame.

In a 2005 poll to find The Comedian's Comedian he was voted among the top 50 comedy acts by fellow comedians and comedy insiders. He was named No. 23 on Comedy Central's list of the 100 greatest stand-up comics.

On November 14, 2026 Wright was honored during the Boston Comedy Festival with a Lifetime Achievement Award.

== Other interests ==
Wright is a musician and has recorded several non-comedy songs with his friend and occasional actor Mark Wuerthner. He also has an interest in painting.

== Filmography ==
=== Film ===
Year	Title	Role	Notes
1979	The Last Word	Man in Crowd	
1985	Desperately Seeking Susan	Larry Stillman D.D.S.	
1986	Coffee and Cigarettes	Steven	Short film; also writer
1988	The Appointments of Dennis Jennings	Dennis Jennings	Also writer and producer
1988	Stars and Bars	Pruitt	
1990	Men of Respect	Sterling	
1992	Reservoir Dogs	K-Billy DJ (voice)	
1993	So I Married an Axe Murderer	Pilot	
1994	The Swan Princess	Speed the Turtle (voice)	
1994	Natural Born Killers	Dr. Emil Reingold	
1994	Speechless	Eddie	
1994	Mixed Nuts	Man at Pay Phone	
1995	For Better or Worse	Cabbie	
1995	Canadian Bacon	Niagara Mountie	
1998	Half Baked	The Guy on the Couch	Uncredited
1998	Babe: Pig in the City	Bob (voice)	
1998	1999	Goatman	
1999	One Soldier	Soldier	Short; director, writer, producer
1999	The Muse	Stan Spielberg	
2000	Loser	Panty Hose Customer	
2003	Coffee and Cigarettes	Steven	Segment: "Strange to Meet You"
2005	Son of the Mask	Daniel Moss	
2005	The Aristocrats	Himself	
2005	When Stand Up Stood Out	Himself	
2017	The Emoji Movie	Mel (voice)	

=== Television ===
Year	Title	Role	Notes
1979	WKRP in Cincinnati	Security Officer	Episode: "Fish Story"
1980	Lenny Clarke's Late Show	Various	Series regular
1985	A Steven Wright Special	Himself	Stand-up special; also writer
1987	Trying Times	Dwight Harper	Episode: "Get a Job"
1991	Wicker Chairs and Gravity	Himself	HBO stand-up special; also writer and producer
1992	Bob	Noah the Cab Driver	Episode: "Mad Dog on 34th Street"
1993	Mad About You	Warren Mermelman	5 episodes
1993–1998	The Larry Sanders Show	Himself	3 episodes
1995, 1997	Dr. Katz, Professional Therapist	Steven (voice)	2 episodes
1997	Happily Ever After: Fairy Tales for Every Child	Bogeyman (voice)	Episode: "Mother Goose"
1997	Almost Perfect	Ray Whitestone	Episode: "Dating for Ratings"
1998	The Simpsons	Himself (voice)	Episode: "The Last Temptation of Krust"
1998–1999	Hercules	Bootes (voice)	2 episodes
1999	Becker	Boyd Crossman	Episode: "Larry Spoke"
1999	Space Ghost Coast to Coast	Himself	Episode: "Snatch"
2001	The Downer Channel	Walter	Episode: "#1.2"
2001	Codename: Kids Next Door	Disease Hotline (voice)	Pilot episode
2006	When the Leaves Blow Away	Himself	Comedy Central stand-up special; also writer and executive producer
2011	Aqua Teen Hunger Force	Danny (voice)	Episode: "Allen Part One"
2011–2015	Louie	Comic Strip MC / Himself	Actor: 2 episodes, story by: "The Road: Part 2", producer: 8 episodes
2015	The Flaming C	R.A.N.D.Y. (voice)	2 episodes
2016	Horace and Pete	Leon	Web series

== Discography ==
=== Albums ===
Year	Title	Label	Formats	Notes
1985	I Have a Pony	Warner Bros. Records	LP/cassette, CD (2005), CD/download (2009)	Deluxe Anniversary Edition CD reissued in 2009 with A Steven Wright Special DVD
2007	I Still Have a Pony	Comedy Central Records	CD/download	Soundtrack of the When the Leaves Blow Away special

=== Specials ===
Year	Title	Studio	Formats
1985	A Steven Wright Special	HBO/Warner Bros. Records	Broadcast, DVD (2009)
1990	Wicker Chairs and Gravity	HBO	Broadcast
2006	When the Leaves Blow Away	Comedy Central/Image Entertainment	Broadcast, DVD (2007), streaming

=== Appearances ===
Year	Title	Label	Notes
1992	Reservoir Dogs: Original Motion Picture Soundtrack	MCA Records	6 tracks of DJ dialogue

== Books ==
- Wright, Steven (May 16, 2023). Harold: A Novel. New York: Simon and Schuster. ISBN 978-1-6680-2269-6. OCLC 1378793643.
