= One Soldier =

- Directed by: Steven Wright
- Starring: Sandi Carroll; Steven Wright
- Release date: March 1999
- Running time: 30 mins
- Country: United States

One Soldier is a black-and-white short film (30 min) from 1999 starring and directed by Steven Wright. Also starring is Sandi Carroll. The film tells the story of a confused soldier (played by Wright) who narrates throughout the movie his bizarre thoughts about the army and war in general, using Wright's trademark deadpan humor. Some of One Soldier was filmed on Block Island, an island off the coast of Rhode Island. Horses from a local stable on the island, Rustic Rides Farm, were used for the scene of Wright with horses on the beach.

== Plot ==
The film is told entirely in retrospect, from a veteran of the American Civil War who may already have been executed. During the war, his job was to play music for a general who decided, in the soldier's words, "where hundreds of men would die." He has come home from the war skeptical about the meaning of life (or that there is a meaning), and trying to search for answers. He attempts to express his thoughts and doubts to his wife Becky, but she remains unconvinced that life is horrible and thinks he is crazy and going to hell. Convinced that people have come to have too much influence over art, he tries to play music not written by people by drawing music lines on his glasses and playing the stars as if they were notes. He also tries to get in touch with God, but, not wanting to be intrusive, he merely hangs about outside the church and whispers through the windows, "God...hey, God...what're you doin'?"

Finally, after many hints, it is revealed why he is sentenced to death: he fought in the war because a rich man paid him to fight in his (the rich man's) place. When the rich man showed up to see how he was fighting, he found the soldier standing and playing the concertina during a battle. The rich man gave him a gun and started yelling at him, so in frustration the soldier shot the rich man instead of the Confederates, picked up the concertina, and left him lying in the field. "He killed the wrong man in the war."

As he is about to be executed, the soldier has an epiphany: "My God...I wasted my whole life thinking about this stuff. I should have just gone fishing! I should have had a sandwich, or had a few laughs! Now I get it!" His illumination is cut off by the firing squad.

He, perhaps in some sort of spirit form, walks through a graveyard and muses, "I'm gonna miss being alive." The credits follow.
