= Kevin Bacon =

American actor (born 1958)

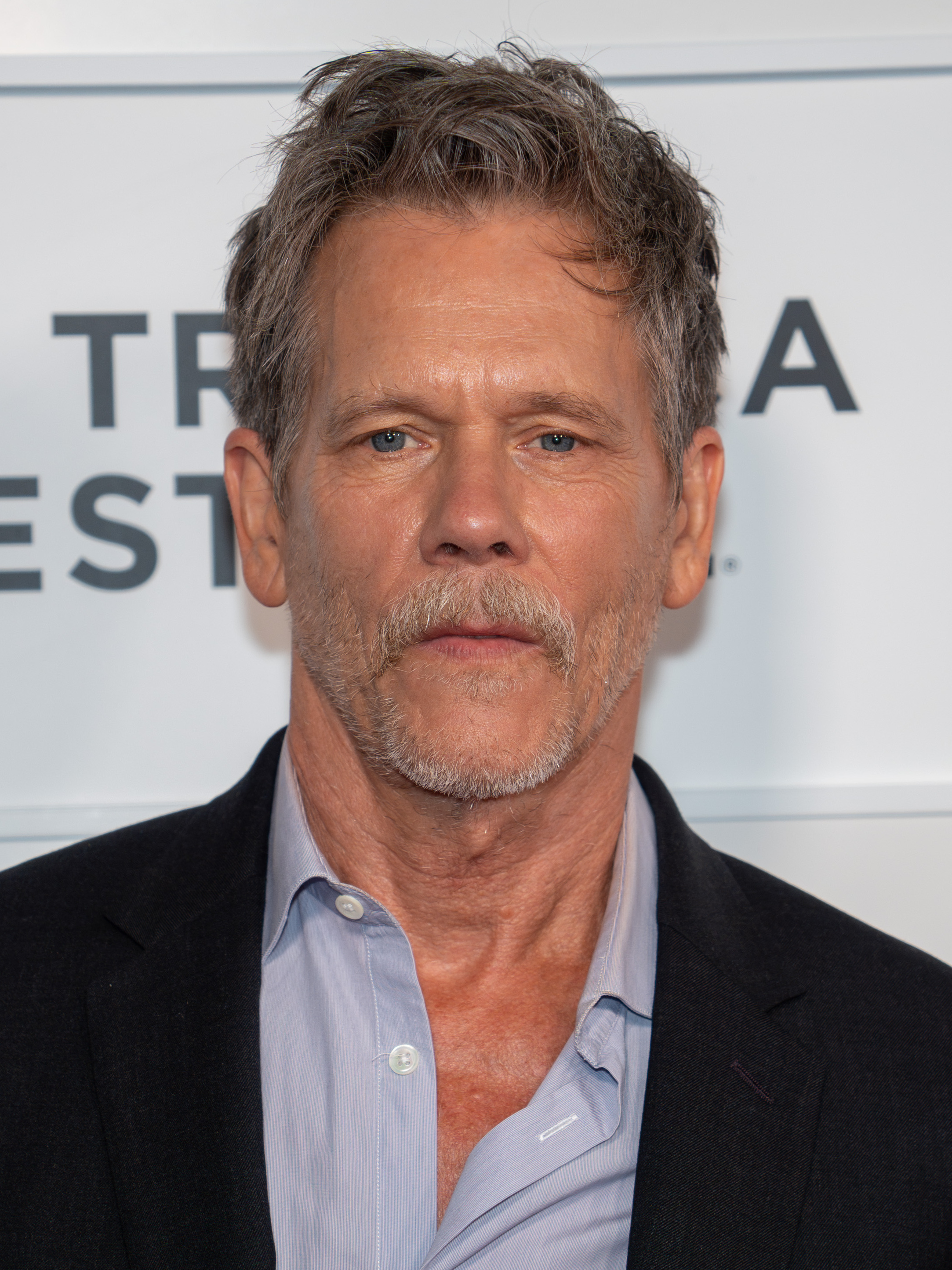
- Bacon in 2025
- Born: Kevin Norwood Bacon; July 8, 1958 (age 68); Philadelphia, Pennsylvania, U.S.
- Occupations: Actor; musician
- Years active: 1977–present
- Works: Filmography
- Spouse: Kyra Sedgwick (m. 1988)
- Children: 2, including Sosie Bacon
- Father: Edmund Bacon
- Relatives: Michael Bacon (brother)
- Website: baconbros.com

Kevin Norwood Bacon (born July 8, 1958) is an American actor. Known for various roles, including leading man characters, Bacon has received numerous accolades such as a Golden Globe Award and two Actor Awards.

Bacon made his feature film debut in National Lampoon's Animal House (1978) and performed in Diner (1982) before his breakthrough role in the musical-drama film Footloose (1984). Since then, he has starred in critically acclaimed films such as JFK (1991), A Few Good Men (1992), Apollo 13 (1995), Mystic River (2003), and Frost/Nixon (2008). Other credits include Friday the 13th (1980), Tremors (1990), The River Wild (1994), Balto (1995), The Woodsman (2004), Crazy, Stupid, Love (2011), X-Men: First Class (2011), and Patriots Day (2016). Bacon has also directed the films Losing Chase (1996) and Loverboy (2005).

On television, Bacon received a Golden Globe Award and a Screen Actors Guild Award for his role as Michael Strobl in the HBO original film Taking Chance (2009). He starred in the Fox drama series The Following from 2013 to 2015. Bacon played the title role in Amazon Prime Video series I Love Dick from 2016 to 2017. From 2019 to 2022, he starred in the Showtime series City on a Hill.

In 2003, Bacon received a star on the Hollywood Walk of Fame. His prolific career in a variety of genres has led him to become associated with the concept of interconnectedness among people, as evidenced by the trivia game "Six Degrees of Kevin Bacon". He is a brand ambassador for British mobile network operator EE and has been featured in advertisements for the company. Bacon is married to actress Kyra Sedgwick.

== Early life and education ==
Bacon was born and raised in a close-knit family in Philadelphia. He is the youngest of six children. His mother, Ruth Hilda (née Holmes; 1916–1991), taught at an elementary school and was a liberal activist, while his father, Edmund Bacon (1910–2005), was an urban planner who served as executive director of the Philadelphia City Planning Commission and authored the seminal text Design of Cities.

Bacon attended Julia R. Masterman School in the Spring Garden section of Philadelphia for middle and high school.

At age 16, in 1975, Bacon won a full state-funded scholarship to the Pennsylvania Governor's School for the Arts at Bucknell University in Lewisburg, Pennsylvania, a five-week arts program where he studied theater under Glory Van Scott. The experience solidified Bacon's passion for the arts.

== Acting career ==
=== Early work ===
Bacon left home at age 17 to pursue a theater career in New York City, where he appeared in a production at the Circle in the Square Theater School. "I wanted life, man, the real thing", he later recalled to Nancy Mills of Cosmopolitan. "The message I got was 'The arts are it. Business is the devil's work. Art and creative expression are next to godliness.' Combine that with an immense ego and you wind up with an actor." Bacon's debut in the fraternity comedy National Lampoon's Animal House (1978) did not lead to the fame he had sought, and Bacon returned to waiting tables and auditioning for small roles in theater. He briefly worked on the television soap operas Search for Tomorrow (1979) and Guiding Light (1980–81) in New York.

=== 1980s ===
In 1980, he appeared in the slasher film Friday the 13th. Some of his early-stage work included Getting Out, performed at New York's Phoenix Theater, and Flux, at Second Stage Theatre during their 1981–1982 season.

In 1982, he won an Obie Award for his role in Forty Deuce, and soon afterward he made his Broadway debut in Slab Boys, with then-unknowns Sean Penn and Val Kilmer. However, it was not until he portrayed Timothy Fenwick that same year in Barry Levinson's film Diner – costarring Steve Guttenberg, Daniel Stern, Mickey Rourke, Tim Daly, and Ellen Barkin – that he made an indelible impression on film critics and moviegoers alike.

Bolstered by the attention garnered by his performance in Diner, Bacon starred in Footloose (1984). Richard Corliss of TIME likened Footloose to the James Dean classic Rebel Without a Cause and the old Mickey Rooney/Judy Garland musicals, commenting that the film includes "motifs on book burning, mid-life crisis, AWOL parents, fatal car crashes, drug enforcement, and Bible Belt vigilantism." To prepare for the role, Bacon enrolled at a high school as a transfer student named "Ren McCormick" and studied teenagers before leaving in the middle of the day. Bacon earned strong reviews for Footloose. Bacon's critical and box office success led to a period of typecasting in roles similar to the two he portrayed in Diner and Footloose, and he had difficulty shaking this on-screen image. For the next several years he chose films that cast him against either type and experienced, by his own estimation, a career slump.

After a cameo in John Hughes's 1987 comedy Planes, Trains and Automobiles, Bacon starred in John Hughes's 1988 comedy She's Having a Baby, and the following year he was in another comedy called The Big Picture.

=== 1990s ===
In 1990, Bacon had two successful roles. He played a character who saved his town from under-the-earth "graboid" monsters in the comedy/horror film Tremors, and he portrayed an earnest medical student experimenting with death in Joel Schumacher's Flatliners.

In Bacon's next project he starred opposite Elizabeth Perkins in He Said, She Said. Despite lukewarm reviews and low audience turnout, He Said, She Said was illuminating for Bacon. Required to play a character with sexist attitudes, he admitted that the role was not that large a stretch for him.

By 1991, Bacon began to give up the idea of playing leading men in big-budget films and to remake himself as a character actor. "The only way I was going to be able to work on 'A' projects with really 'A' directors was if I wasn't the guy who was starring", he confided to The New York Times writer Trip Gabriel. "You can't afford to set up a $40 million movie if you don't have your star." He performed that year as gay prostitute Willie O'Keefe in Oliver Stone's JFK and went on to play a prosecuting attorney in the military courtroom drama A Few Good Men. Later that year he returned to the theater to play in Spike Heels, directed by Michael Greif.

In 1994, Bacon earned a Golden Globe nomination for his role in The River Wild, opposite Meryl Streep. He described the film to Chase in Cosmopolitan as a "grueling shoot", in which "every one of us fell out of the boat at one point or another and had to be saved".

His next film, Murder in the First, earned him the Broadcast Film Critic's Association Award in 1995, the same year that he starred in the blockbuster hit Apollo 13. Bacon played a trademark dark role once again in Sleepers (1996). This part starkly contrasted with his appearance in the lighthearted romantic comedy, Picture Perfect (1997).

Bacon made his debut as a director with the television film Losing Chase (1996), which was nominated for three Golden Globe Awards, and won one. Bacon again resurrected his oddball mystique that year as a mentally-challenged houseguest in Digging to China and as a disc jockey corrupted by payola in Telling Lies in America. As the executive producer of Wild Things (1998), Bacon reserved a supporting role for himself and went on to star in Stir of Echoes (1999), directed by David Koepp.

=== 2000s ===
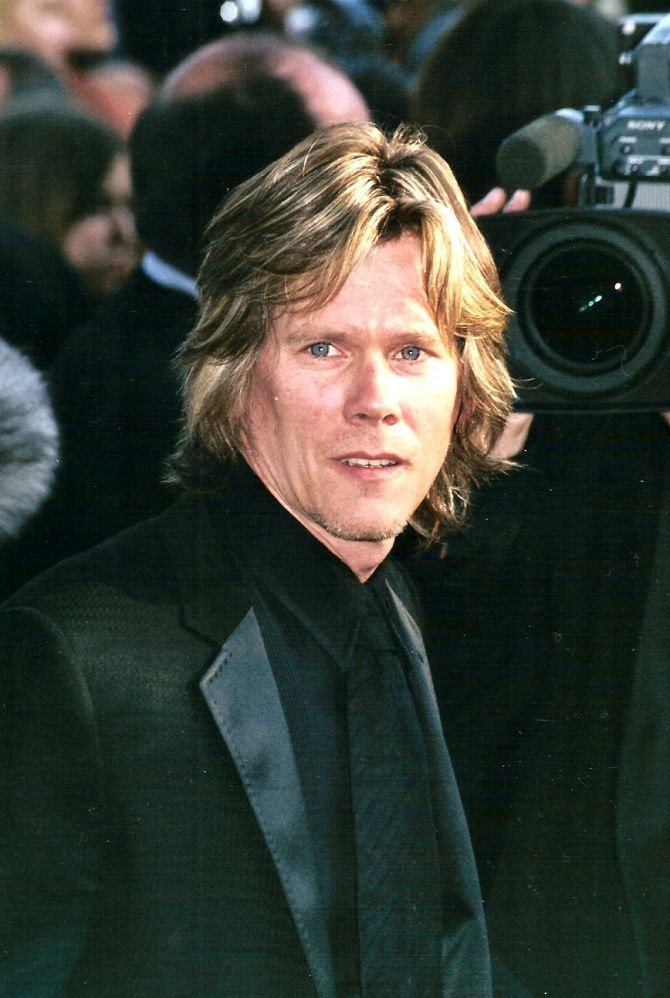
Bacon at the 2004 Cannes Film Festival

In 2000, he appeared in Paul Verhoeven's Hollow Man. Bacon, Colin Firth and Rachel Blanchard depict a ménage à trois in their film, Where the Truth Lies. Bacon and director Atom Egoyan condemned the MPAA ratings board decision to rate the film "NC-17" rather than the preferable "R". Bacon commented: "I don't get it, when I see films (that) are extremely violent, extremely objectionable sometimes in terms of the roles that women play, slide by with an R, no problem, because the people happen to have more of their clothes on." That same year, he played the gruff father in the family film My Dog Skip.

In 2003, Bacon acted with Sean Penn and Tim Robbins in Clint Eastwood's movie Mystic River. He was again acclaimed for a dark starring role playing an offending pedophile on parole in The Woodsman (2004), for which he was nominated for best actor and received the Independent Spirit Award.

In 2005, Bacon was in the comedy film Beauty Shop with Queen Latifah. He appeared in the HBO Films production of Taking Chance (2009), based on an eponymous story written by Lieutenant Colonel Michael Strobl, an American Desert Storm war veteran. The film premiered on HBO on February 21, 2009. Bacon won a Golden Globe Award and a Screen Actors Guild Award for Outstanding Performance by a Male Actor in a Miniseries or Television Movie for his role.

=== 2010s ===
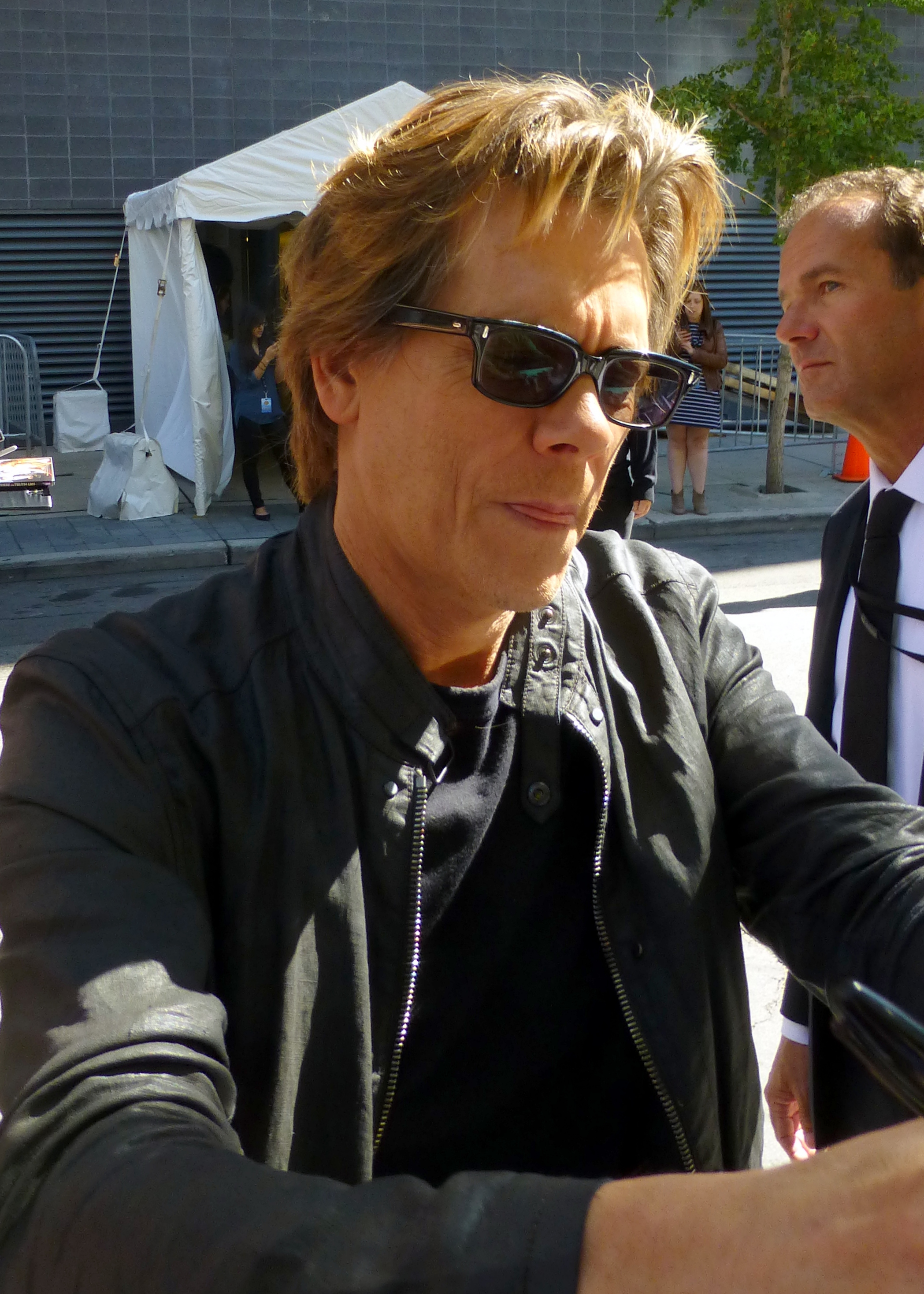
Bacon at the Toronto Film Festival in 2015

On July 15, 2010, it was confirmed that Bacon would appear in Matthew Vaughn's X-Men: First Class as mutant villain Sebastian Shaw. The film was released in 2011, the same year as the romantic comedy Crazy, Stupid, Love, in which Bacon portrayed a co-worker involved in an affair.

In March 2012, Bacon was featured in a performance of Dustin Lance Black's play, 8 – a staged reenactment of the federal trial that overturned California's Prop 8 ban on same-sex marriage – as Attorney Charles J. Cooper. The production was held at the Wilshire Ebell Theatre and broadcast on YouTube to raise money for the American Foundation for Equal Rights.

From 2013 to 2015, Bacon starred as Ryan Hardy in the FOX television series The Following. In 2013, he won a Saturn Award for Best Actor on Television for that role. In 2015, he appeared in the crime film Black Mass, which starred Johnny Depp.

In 2015, he said in a Huffington Post interview he would like to return to the Tremors franchise. However, Bacon did not appear in Tremors 5: Bloodline (2015). He starred in Patriots Day in 2016, which was about the 2013 Boston Marathon bombing.

== Other ventures ==
In 1995, Kevin formed a band called The Bacon Brothers with his brother, Michael. The duo has released seven albums. Bacon also sings in a variety of other media; he has serenaded his goats on Instagram, and sings with the band the Old 97's in his role as himself in The Guardians of the Galaxy Holiday Special.

Beginning in 2012, Bacon has appeared in a major advertising campaign for EE in the United Kingdom, based on the Six Degrees concept and his various film roles. In 2015, he became a commercial spokesperson for the U.S. egg industry.

== Six Degrees of Kevin Bacon ==
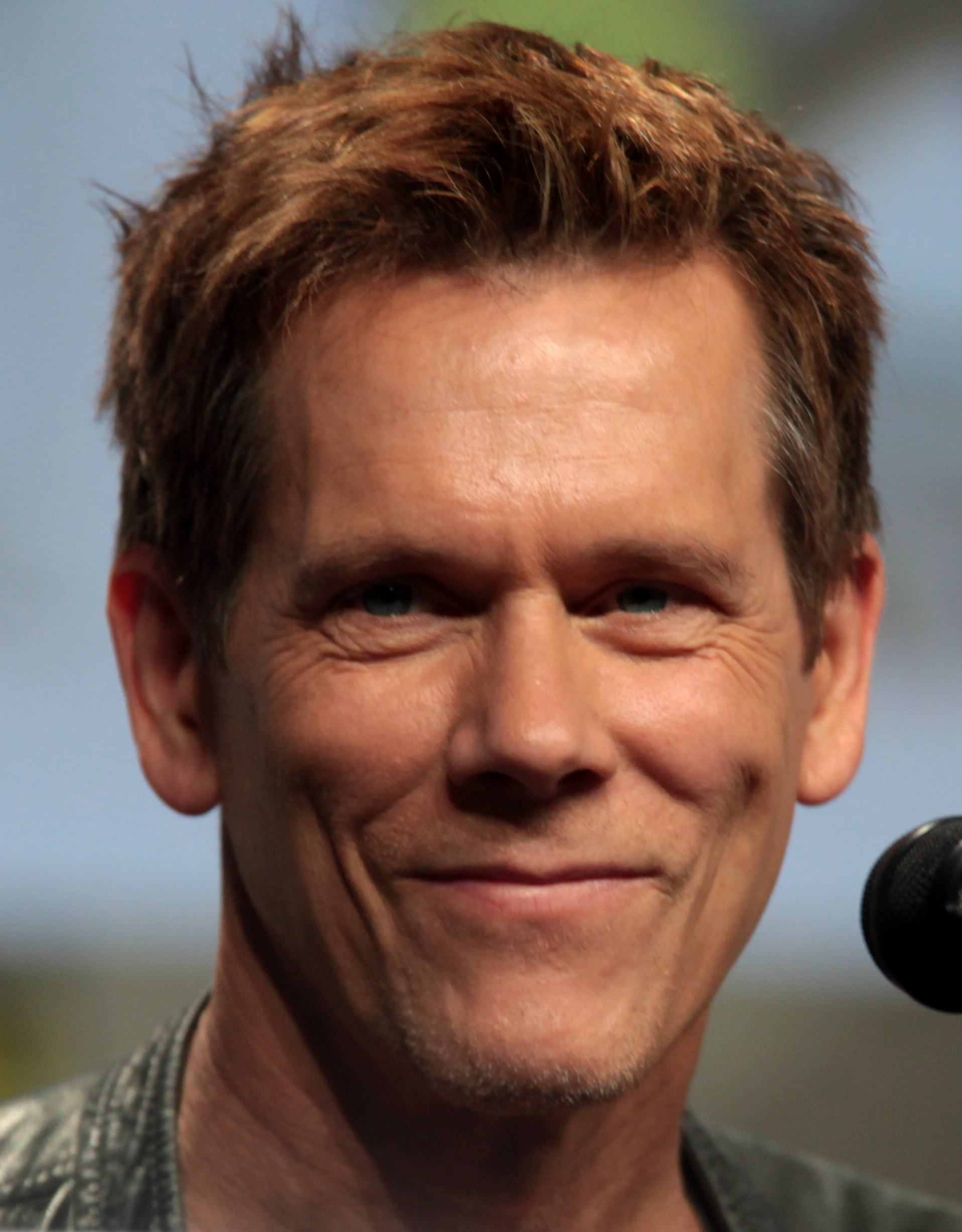
Kevin Bacon in 2014

Bacon is the subject of the trivia game titled "Six Degrees of Kevin Bacon", based on the idea that, due to his prolific screen career covering a diverse range of genres, any Hollywood actor can be linked to another in a handful of steps based on their association with Bacon. The name of the game derives from the idea of six degrees of separation. Initially, Bacon was dismayed by the game but the meme stuck; eventually, he embraced it, forming the charitable initiative SixDegrees.org, a social networking service intended to link people and charities to each other.

The measure of proximity to Bacon has been mathematically formalized as the Bacon number and can be referenced at websites including Oracle of Bacon, which is in turn based upon Wikipedia data (and formerly from Internet Movie Database data). In 2012, Google added a feature to their search engine, whereby searching for an actor's name followed by the words "Bacon Number" would show the ways in which that actor is connected to Kevin Bacon. This feature is no longer active.

A similar measurement exists in the mathematics community, where one measures how far one is removed from co-writing a mathematical paper with the prolific and itinerant mathematician Paul Erdős. This is done by means of the Erdős number, which is 0 for Paul Erdős himself, 1 for someone who co-wrote an article with him, 2 for someone who co-wrote with someone who co-wrote with him, etc. People have combined the Bacon number and the Erdős number to form the Erdős–Bacon number, which is the sum of the two.

== Personal life ==
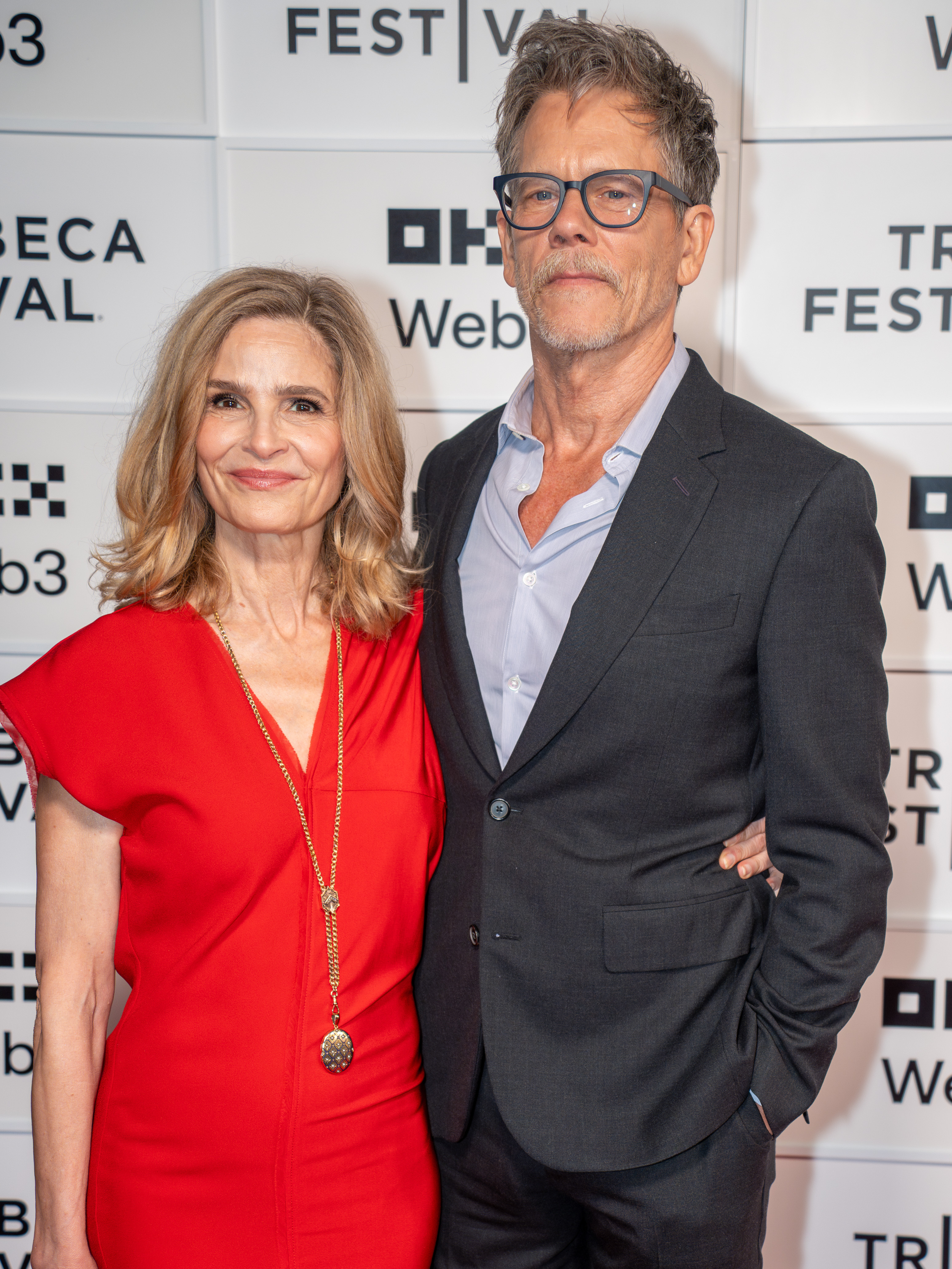
Kyra Sedgwick and Kevin Bacon during The Best You Can premiere at the 2025 Tribeca Festival

Bacon has been married to actress Kyra Sedgwick since September 4, 1988; they met on the set of the PBS version of Lanford Wilson's play Lemon Sky. He has said: "The time I was hitting what I considered to be bottom was also the time I met my wife, our kids were born, good things were happening. And I was able to keep supporting myself; that always gave me strength." Bacon and Sedgwick have starred together in Pyrates, Murder in the First, The Woodsman, and Loverboy. They have two children, a son, Travis (born 1989) and a daughter, Sosie Ruth (born 1992). They reside on the Upper West Side of Manhattan. Bacon was previously in a five-year relationship with actress Tracy Pollan, in the 1980s.

Bacon has spoken out for the separation of church and state, and told The Times in 2005 that he did not "believe in God." He has also said that he is not anti-religion.

Bacon and Sedgwick appeared in will.i.am's video "It's a New Day", which was released following Barack Obama's 2008 presidential win.

The pair lost part of their savings in the Ponzi scheme of infamous swindler Bernie Madoff.

Bacon and Sedgwick learned in 2011, via their appearance on the PBS TV series Finding Your Roots with Henry Louis Gates, that they are ninth cousins, once removed. They also appeared in a video promoting the "Bill of Reproductive Rights", supporting among other things a woman's right to choose and have access to birth control.

== Accolades ==
=== Awards and nominations ===
Association	Year	Category	Title	Result
Awards Circuit Community Awards	1995	Best Cast Ensemble	Apollo 13	Nominated
Awards Circuit Community Awards	2003	Best Cast Ensemble	Mystic River	Nominated
Blockbuster Entertainment Awards	2001	Favorite Actor – Science Fiction	Hollow Man	Won
Boston Society of Film Critics Awards	2003	Best Ensemble Cast	Mystic River	Won
Bravo Otto Awards	1984	Best Actor	Footloose	Nominated
CableACE Awards	1997	Directing a Movie or Miniseries	Losing Chase	Nominated
Chlotrudis Awards	2005	Best Actor	The Woodsman	Nominated
Critics' Choice Movie Awards	1996	Best Actor	Murder in the First	Won
Ghent International Film Festival	2004	Special Mention	The Woodsman	Won
Giffoni Film Festival	1997	Best Actor	Digging to China	Won
Gold Derby Awards	2004	Ensemble Cast	Mystic River	Nominated
Golden Globe Awards	1995	Best Supporting Actor in a Motion Picture	The River Wild	Nominated
Golden Globe Awards	2010	Best Actor in a Miniseries or Motion Picture Made for Television	Taking Chance	Won
Golden Globe Awards	2018	Best Actor in a Television Series – Comedy or Musical	I Love Dick	Nominated
Independent Spirit Awards	2005	Best Male Lead	The Woodsman	Nominated
Italian Online Movie Awards	2004	Best Supporting Actor	Mystic River	Nominated
MTV Movie + TV Awards	2001	Best Villain	Hollow Man	Nominated
Online Film & Television Association Awards	2009	Best Actor in a Motion Picture or Miniseries	Taking Chance	Nominated
Online Film & Television Association Awards	2015	Best Actor in a Drama Series	The Following	Nominated
People's Choice Awards	2014	Favorite Dramatic Television Actor	The Following	Nominated
People's Choice Awards	2015	Favorite Crime Drama Television Actor	The Following	Nominated
Primetime Emmy Awards	2009	Outstanding Lead Actor in a Miniseries or a Movie	Taking Chance	Nominated
Satellite Awards	2005	Best Actor in a Motion Picture – Drama	The Woodsman	Nominated
Satellite Awards	2009	Best Actor in a Miniseries or Motion Picture Made for Television	Taking Chance	Nominated
Saturn Awards	2013	Best Actor on Television	The Following	Won
Saturn Awards	2014	Best Actor on Television	The Following	Nominated
Scream Awards	2011	Best Villain	X-Men: First Class	Nominated
Screen Actors Guild Awards	1996	Outstanding Performance by a Male Actor in a Supporting Role	Murder in the First	Nominated
Screen Actors Guild Awards	1996	Outstanding Performance by a Cast in a Motion Picture	Apollo 13	Won
Screen Actors Guild Awards	2004	Outstanding Performance by a Cast in a Motion Picture	Mystic River	Nominated
Screen Actors Guild Awards	2009	Outstanding Performance by a Cast in a Motion Picture	Frost/Nixon	Nominated
Screen Actors Guild Awards	2010	Outstanding Performance by a Male Actor in a Television Movie or Miniseries	Taking Chance	Won
Teen Choice Awards	2005	Choice Movie – Sleazbag	Beauty Shop	Nominated
Teen Choice Awards	2011	Choice Movie – Villain	X-Men: First Class	Nominated
TV Guide Awards	2013	Favorite Actor	The Following	Nominated

=== Other honors ===
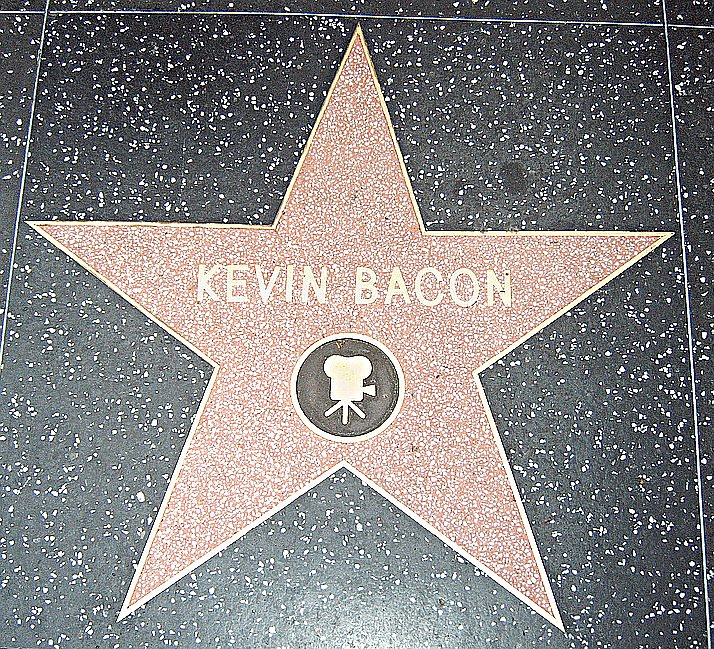
Bacon's star on the Hollywood Walk of Fame

- 2003, September 30: Inducted into Hollywood Walk of Fame with a star for his contribution to Motion Picture presented to him by the Chamber of Commerce.
- 2004: Received the John Cassavetes Award during the Denver International Film Festival.
- 2005: Received the Copper Wing Tribute Award during the Phoenix Film Festival.
- 2005: Received the American Rivera Award during the Santa Barbara International Film Festival.
- 2010: Honored with the Joel Siegel Award by the Broadcast Film Critics Association.
- 2015: Honored with the Career Achievement in Acting Award by the Seattle International Film Festival.

== See also ==
- List of atheists in film, radio, television and theater
- List of actors with Hollywood Walk of Fame motion picture stars
