= The Adam Buxton Podcast =

British interview podcast

- Genre: Talk

Creative team
- Created by: Adam Buxton

Cast and voices
- Hosted by: Adam Buxton

Production
- Production: Adam Buxton, Séamus Murphy-Mitchell

Publication
- Original release: 15 September 2015

Related
- Website: https://www.adam-buxton.co.uk/podcasts

The Adam Buxton Podcast is a podcast in which the English comedian Adam Buxton interviews guests. The first episode was released in 2015. Recurring guests include the comedian Natasia Demetriou and the filmmakers Joe Cornish, Louis Theroux, Richard Ayoade and Garth Jennings.

== Background ==
With Joe Cornish, Buxton presented the 1990s television series The Adam and Joe Show, followed by the BBC Radio 6 Music series Adam and Joe. When Cornish released his first feature film, Attack the Block (2011), Buxton worried his own career was declining. After listening to American podcasts including This American Life and WTF with Marc Maron, he decided to create a British longform interview podcast. He released the first episode in September 2015.

== Format ==
Most episodes begin with an introduction from Buxton as he walks through the Norfolk countryside with his dog, Rosie, followed by a previously recorded conversation with the episode's guest. Interviews cover personal and cultural topics, punctuated with musical interludes from Buxton. Christmas episodes feature Cornish.

Buxton described the podcast as "a confection ... a heavily stylised greatest hits of a conversation". He told Wired that podcasts can "accommodate the rhythms and meanderings of a real conversation in a way that few other mediums are suited to do", unlike the tightly edited interviews and conversations of broadcast radio and television. In 2025, Buxton said he would stop recording the podcast when Rosie dies.

== Reception ==
The Guardian described Buxton's interviews as "a masterclass in softly-softly interviewing", and named episode 29, an interview with the documentary filmmaker Louis Theroux, one of the "ultimate podcast episodes". The Irish Times wrote that "Buxton's interviews are gentle, funny, compassionate, interested – it's almost as if you could learn how to be a better conversationalist just from listening to him". GQ wrote that Buxton "can be funny, flippant and throwaway, while also revealing a deeply personal emotional honesty and vulnerability".

== Awards ==
Year	Award	Awarding body	Result
2016	Best Online Talk Show, Comedy	The Online Radio Awards	Won
2017	Internet Award	Chortle	Won
2017	Podcast Champion	British Podcast Awards	Won

== Episodes ==
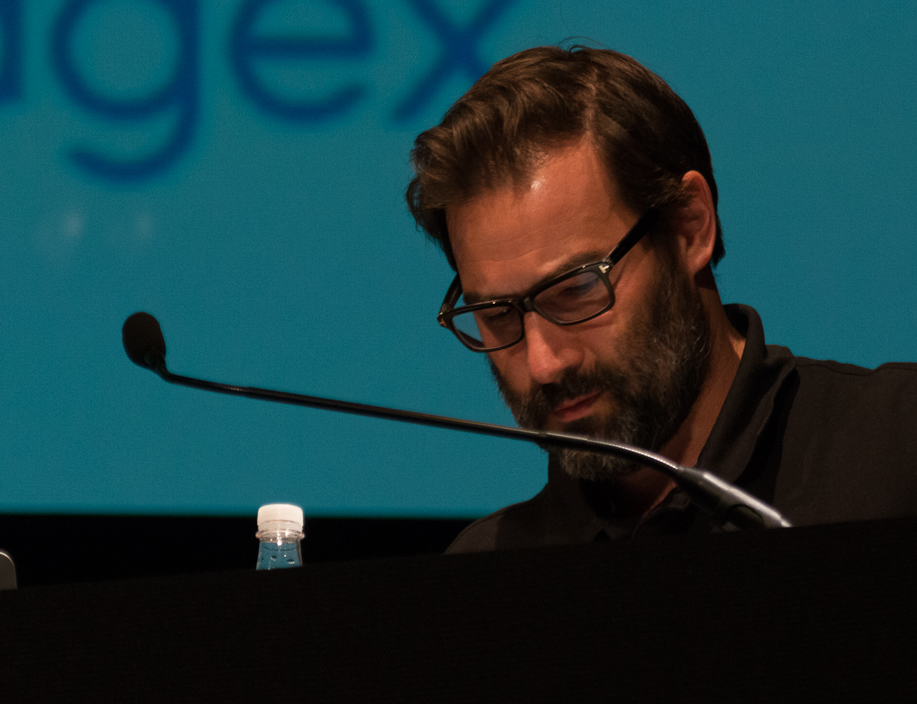
Adam Buxton in 2013

Episode	Release date	Subject
1	15 September 2015	Louis Theroux
2	23 September 2015	Lianne La Havas
3	30 September 2015	Dr Buckles' Cold Safari
4	7 October 2015	Jon Ronson
5	14 October 2015	Rob Brydon
6	21 October 2015	Garth Jennings
7	29 October 2015	Scroobius Pip
8	11 November 2015	Rob Delaney
9	19 November 2015	Caitlin Moran
10	27 November 2015	Louis Theroux
11	23 December 2015	Joe Cornish
12	25 December 2015	Adam and Joe Christmas Podcast
13	8 March 2016	David Bowie tribute
14	24 March 2016	David Bowie tribute II
15	6 April 2016	Kathy Burke
16	13 April 2016	Garth Jennings
17	21 April 2016	Richard Herring
18	28 April 2016	Sara Pascoe
19	6 May 2016	Doc Brown
20	27 May 2016	Iain Lee
21	3 June 2016	Marc Riley
22	12 June 2016	Jonny Greenwood
22b	19 June 2016	Jonny Greenwood
23	23 June 2016	John Robins
24	8 July 2016	Richard Ayoade
25	9 July 2016	Richard Ayoade
26	21 July 2016	Sally Wainwright
27	11 August 2016	Bill Hader
28	1 September 2016	Michael Palin
29	12 September 2016	Louis Theroux
30	21 September 2016	Michaela Coel
31	12 October 2016	Panti
32	25 October 2016	Natasia Demetriou
33	13 November 2016	Matt Berry
34	25 December 2016	Joe Cornish
35	23 March 2017	Steve Coogan
36	30 March 2017	Claudia O'Doherty
37	6 April 2017	Brian Eno
38	6 April 2017	Brian Eno
39	13 April 2017	Julian Barratt and Garth Jennings
40	20 April 2017	Zadie Smith
41	27 April 2017	Marc Maron
42	4 May 2017	Bridget Christie and Steve Mason
43	11 May 2017	Nick Kroll
44	18 May 2017	Adam Curtis
45	26 May 2017	Edgar Wright
46	2 June 2017	Sharon Horgan
47	17 June 2017	Spoon
48	14 September 2017	Dougie Payne
49	24 September 2017	Louis Theroux
50	29 September 2017	Mae Martin
51	6 October 2017	Johnny Marr
52	12 October 2017	Reece Shearsmith and Steve Pemberton
53	21 October 2017	Miranda Sawyer
54	26 October 2017	Bill Burr
55	3 November 2017	Simon Amstell
56	11 November 2017	Kathy Burke
57	18 November 2017	Hassan Akkad
58	26 November 2017	Josh Homme and Matt Berry
59	26 November 2017	Tim Pope
60	9 December 2017	Thomas Dolby
61	16 December 2017	Romesh Ranganathan
62	25 December 2017	Joe Cornish
63A	9 February 2018	Paul Thomas Anderson
63B	9 February 2018	Jonny Greenwood
64	16 February 2018	Greta Gerwig
65	23 February 2018	Diane Morgan
66	2 March 2018	Michael Lewis
67	10 March 2018	Aisling Bea
68	16 March 2018	Jon Ronson
69	23 March 2018	Lolly Adefope
70	31 March 2018	Garth Jennings and Wes Anderson
71	7 April 2018	Jayde Adams
72	14 April 2018	Fenton Bailey
73	21 April 2018	Cariad Lloyd
74	28 April 2018	Bob Mortimer
75	5 May 2018	Eleanor Friedberger
76	13 May 2018	Charlie Brooker
77	7 June 2018	Tim Key
78	18 August 2018	Laura Davis and Mac DeMarco
79	12 October 2018	David Sedaris
80	20 October 2018	Desiree Burch
81	27 October 2018	Louis Theroux
82	3 November 2018	Natasia Demetriou
83	12 November 2018	Simon Pegg
84	17 November 2018	Roisin Conaty
85	26 November 2018	Michael Scott Moore
86	3 December 2018	Mona Chalabi
87	10 December 2018	Nish Kumar
88	25 December 2018	Joe Cornish
89	19 April 2019	David Mitchell
90	26 April 2019	Ruby Wax
91	4 May 2019	Marlon James
92	11 May 2019	James Acaster
93	18 May 2019	Charlotte Gainsbourg
94	25 May 2019	Nina Stibbe
95	2 June 2019	John Grant
96	8 June 2019	Charlotte Church
97	15 June 2019	Bob Mortimer and Paul Whitehouse
98	29 June 2019	Maya Foa
99	7 July 2019	Frank Skinner
100	13 July 2019	Joe Cornish and Louis Theroux
101	21 July 2019	Sara Pascoe and Richard Ayoade
102	4 October 2019	Philip Pullman
103	12 October 2019	Emily Dean
104	14 October 2019	Chris Morris
105	18 October 2019	Chris Morris
106	25 October 2019	Shoshana Zuboff
107	1 November 2019	Guz Khan
108	8 November 2019	Michael Kiwanuka
109	16 November 2019	Dawn O'Porter
110	22 November 2019	Derren Brown
111	26 November 2019	Nicky Wire
112	2 December 2019	Diana Fleischman
113	7 December 2019	Jeff Goldblum
114	14 December 2019	Billy Connolly
115	25 December 2019	Joe Cornish
116	26 March 2020	Xand van Tulleken
117	31 March 2020	Daisy Haggard
118	5 April 2020	Malcolm Gladwell
119	16 April 2020	Romesh Ranganathan
120	26 April 2020	Natasia Demetriou
121	3 May 2020	Louis Theroux
122	10 May 2020	Laura Marling
123	17 May 2020	Nile Rodgers
124	26 May 2020	Sara Barron
125	26 May 2020	George the Poet
126	30 June 2020	Joe Cornish
127	13 July 2020	Holly Walsh
128	19 July 2020	Ed O'Brien
129	27 July 2020	Helen Lewis
130	5 August 2020	Zadie Smith
131	26 September 2020	Caitlin Moran
132	3 October 2020	Robbie Williams
133	9 October 2020	Raven Smith
134	12 October 2020	Sleaford Mods
135	17 October 2020	Ellie White
136	25 October 2020	Blindboy Boatclub
137	31 October 2020	Nina Conti
138	5 November 2020	Miles Jupp
139	9 November 2020	Fran Healy
140	14 November 2020	Candice Carty-Williams
141	22 November 2020	Joe Lycett
142	30 November 2020	Benjamin Zephaniah
143	6 December 2020	Rachel Bloom
144	11 December 2020	Paul McCartney
145	25 December 2020	Joe Cornish
146	31 January 2021	Stewart Lee
147	7 February 2021	Elizabeth Day
148	14 February 2021	Tony Law
149	21 February 2021	Róisín Murphy
150	28 February 2021	Louis Theroux
151	3 March 2021	Torvill and Dean
152	8 March 2021	Rose Matafeo
153	15 March 2021	Kazuo Ishiguro
154	28 March 2021	Tom Allen
155	5 April 2021	Laurie Anderson
156	14 April 2021	Lee Mack
157	20 August 2021	Eric André and Phoebe Bridgers
158	29 August 2021	Isabel Allende
159	4 September 2021	Tommy Tiernan
160	12 September 2021	Sarah Silverman
161	20 September 2021	Georgia Pritchett
162	26 September 2021	Jim Moir (AKA Vic Reeves)
163	5 October 2021	Lauren Pattinson and Sam Lee
164	10 October 2021	Colson Whitehead
165	19 October 2021	David Sedaris
166	25 October 2021	Darren Harriott
167	2 November 2021	Julia Davis
168	9 November 2021	Patrick Radden Keefe
169	18 November 2021	Katy Wix
170	26 November 2021	Kayvan Novak
171	7 December 2021	Fran Lebowitz
172	25 December 2021	Joe Cornish
173	17 April 2022	Marian Keyes
174	25 April 2022	Alex Horne
175	26 April 2022	Tim Key
176	04 May 2022	Phil Wang and Spoon
177	11 May 2022	Lazy Susan (Celeste Dring and Freya Parker)
178	19 May 2022	Sanjeev Bhaskar
179	27 May 2022	Natalie Palamides
180	10 June 2022	Jarvis Cocker
181	19 June 2022	Yola
182	27 June 2022	John Higgs
183	4 July 2022	Natasia Demetriou
184	17 July 2022	Louis Theroux
185	12 August 2022	Mariana Mazzucato
186	17 August 2022	Belle and Sebastian
187	9 September 2022	Anil Seth
188	2 October 2022	Graham Norton
189	9 October 2022	Samira Ahmed
190	16 October 2022	Ian McEwan
191	23 October 2022	Lorna Tucker
192	1 November 2022	Richard E. Grant
193	9 November 2022	Maeve Higgins
194	15 November 2022	Richard Dawson
195	21 November 2022	Ravi and Gbenga Adelekan
196	29 November 2022	Michelle de Swarte
197	6 December 2022	Paddy Considine
198	13 December 2022	Nihal Arthanayake
199	20 December 2022	Gary Younge
200	25 December 2022	Joe Cornish
201	13 May 2023	Tom Hanks
202	25 June 2023	Louis Theroux
203	16 September 2023	Natasia Demetriou
204	24 September 2023	Jesse Armstrong
205	24 September 2023	Sam Bain
206	1 October 2023	Daisy May Cooper
207	9 October 2023	Billy Bragg
208	16 October 2023	Natalie Wynn
209	22 October 2023	Bridget Christie
210	26 October 2023	Javid Abdelmoneim
211	31 October 2023	Guz Khan
212	6 November 2023	Kirsty Young
213	14 November 2023	Will Sharpe
214	21 November 2023	Miki Berenyi
215	27 November 2023	Daudi Matsiko
216	5 December 2023	Joe Lycett
217	24 December 2023	Adam and Joe live at Royal Festival Hall
218	6 February 2024	Werner Herzog
219	14 February 2024	Ayishat Akanbi
220	18 February 2024	Fred Armisen
221	26 February 2024	Tim Heidecker
222	4 March 2024	George Monbiot
223	10 March 2024	Jessica Knappett
224	29 March 2024	Fenton Bailey
225	20 September 2024	Miriam Margolyes
226	28 September 2024	Sam Campbell
227	5 October 2024	Helen Lewis
228	13 October 2024	Dr. John Cooper Clark
229	20 October 2024	Garth Jennings and Laura Marling live
230	23 October 2024	Colm Tóibín
231	3 November 2024	Kerry Godliman
232	11 November 2024	Patric Gagne
233	22 November 2024	Marina Hyde
234	20 November 2024	Natasia Demetriou live
235	8 December 2024	Kim Deal
236	16 December 2024	Kiell Smith-Bynoe
237	22 December 2024	Dame Mary Beard
238	25 December 2024	Adam and Joe live at Royal Festival Hall
239	25 January 2025	Rob Burley
240	28 March 2025	David Letterman
241	5 April 2025	CMAT
242	11 April 2025	Richard Ayoade
243	19 April 2025	Kate Mossman
244	27 April 2025	Louis Theroux and Richard Dawson live at Eventim Apollo 2024
245	11 May 2025	Kate Nash
246	17 May 2025	Jo Brand
247	25 May 2025	Tim Key and Tom Basden
248	2 June 2025	Loyle Carner
249	11 June 2025	Pauline Black
250	18 June 2025	Jonny Sweet
251	22 June 2025	Declan McKenna
252	29 June 2025	Guz Khan live at Albert Hall, Manchester, 2024
253	10 July 2025	Squid
254	25 July 2025	Jessica Knappett with music from Daudi Matsiko
255	29 August 2025	David Byrne
256	5 September 2025	Colin Greenwood
257	8 September 2025	Benedict Cumberbatch
258	15 September 2025	Emma Sidi
259	22 September 2025	Eric Idle
260	30 September 2025	Natalie Roberts
261	8 October 2025	Ayoade Bamgboye
262	24 October 2025	John Foxx
263	1 November 2025	Zadie Smith
264	9 November 2025	David O'Doherty (live)
265	17 November 2025	Lucy Walker
266	25 November 2025	Devendra Banhart
267	1 December 2025	Richard Ayoade and Frank Black (live)
268	25 December 2025	Adam and Joe Christmas Special
269	20 April 2026	Jamie Hewlett and Damon Albarn (AKA Gorillaz)
270	1 May 2026	Rebecca Lucy Taylor (AKA Self Esteem)
