= Adam and Joe =

British comedy performers

- From left: Adam Buxton, Nigel Buxton, and Joe Cornish on the set of The Adam and Joe Show (Series 4)
- Notable work: The Adam and Joe Show; Adam and Joe

Comedy career
- Years active: 1994–present
- Medium: Television, radio, podcast
- Genre: Sketch comedy
- Subject: Popular culture
- Members: Adam Buxton; Joe Cornish

Adam Buxton and Joe Cornish are British comedy performers known together as Adam and Joe. They are best known for presenting Adam and Joe on BBC Radio 6 Music (2007–2009, 2011) and The Adam and Joe Show on Channel 4 (1996–2001).

== History ==
Adam and Joe began working on comedy material during their time at Westminster School together, where they created numerous amateur films along with their friend Louis Theroux. Some of these films were submitted to Channel 4's home video showcase Takeover TV in 1994 and led to Adam hosting that show in 1995.

Together, they hosted The Adam and Joe Show on Channel 4 from 1996 to 2001. They won the Royal Television Society Best Newcomers Award in 1998, published The Adam and Joe Book in 1999, and presented BBC Three's coverage of the Glastonbury Festival in 2000 and 2002. Other spin-off projects included Adam & Joe's Fourmative Years in 1998 and Adam and Joe's American Animation Adventure in 2001. In 2002, Adam and Joe (who is an amateur magician) went on to present 50 Greatest Magic Tricks for Channel 4

They directed pop promos for Frank Black and Gorky's Zygotic Mynci, as well as appearing in two Surf washing powder commercials, in which they comically set upon Laurence Llewelyn-Bowen and Keith Harris and Orville.

In 2003, Buxton and Cornish presented Adam and Joe Go Tokyo, a Tokyo-based magazine show covering Japanese pop culture for BBC Three and BBC One. The same year, they began hosting a show on British radio station Xfm, filling in for Ricky Gervais on Saturday afternoons. When Gervais left the station they took over permanently, and continued to present the Saturday morning show, until Summer 2006. The best parts of these shows were condensed into a series of twenty podcasts, including their 2001 E4 series Shock Video, in which the duo provide an often totally irrelevant comic commentary on soft-core porn clips from around the world.

From August 2006 until October 2007, they hosted the monthly "Coca-Cola New Music Podcast", which showcased unsigned bands from around Europe, presented in a similar style to their Xfm shows.

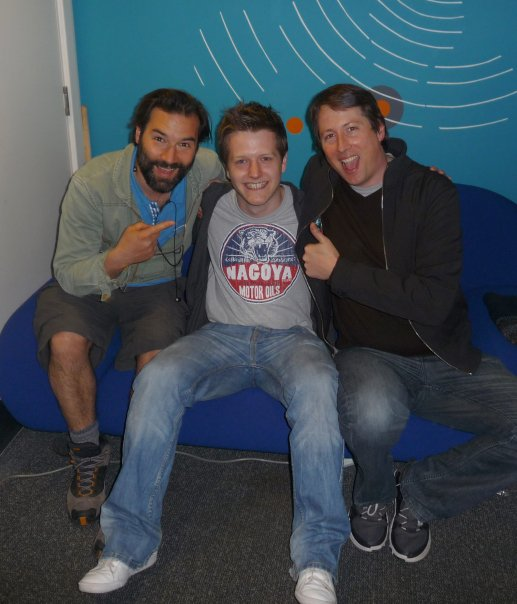
A fan with Adam and Joe at BBC 6 Music in 2009

Adam and Joe began presenting the BBC Radio 6 Music Saturday morning show in October 2007. Features on the show included "Song Wars", where they both composed original compositions based on a common theme. Listeners then voted for which song they think is the best. "Text the Nation" was another regular feature where listeners provided anecdotes based on a theme or question set by Adam and Joe. Themes have included "Childhood Misconceptions" and "Horror Film Ideas". The "Text the Nation" feature was also instrumental in the uncovering and subsequent popularisation of the Stephen! call and response.

Their show won a Broadcasting Press Guild Award in 2008 for best radio programme of the year.

The duo sometimes write a column for The Idler, a yearly literary magazine.
