= Okido =

Okido may refer to:

- Okido (magazine), British children's magazine
- Ōkido Moriemon (1878-1930), Japanese sumo wrestler
- Professor Oak, Pokémon character, who is known in Japanese as Professor Okido.

== See also ==
- Messy Goes to Okido, British children's TV series
