= Adam Buxton =

English comedian (born 1969)

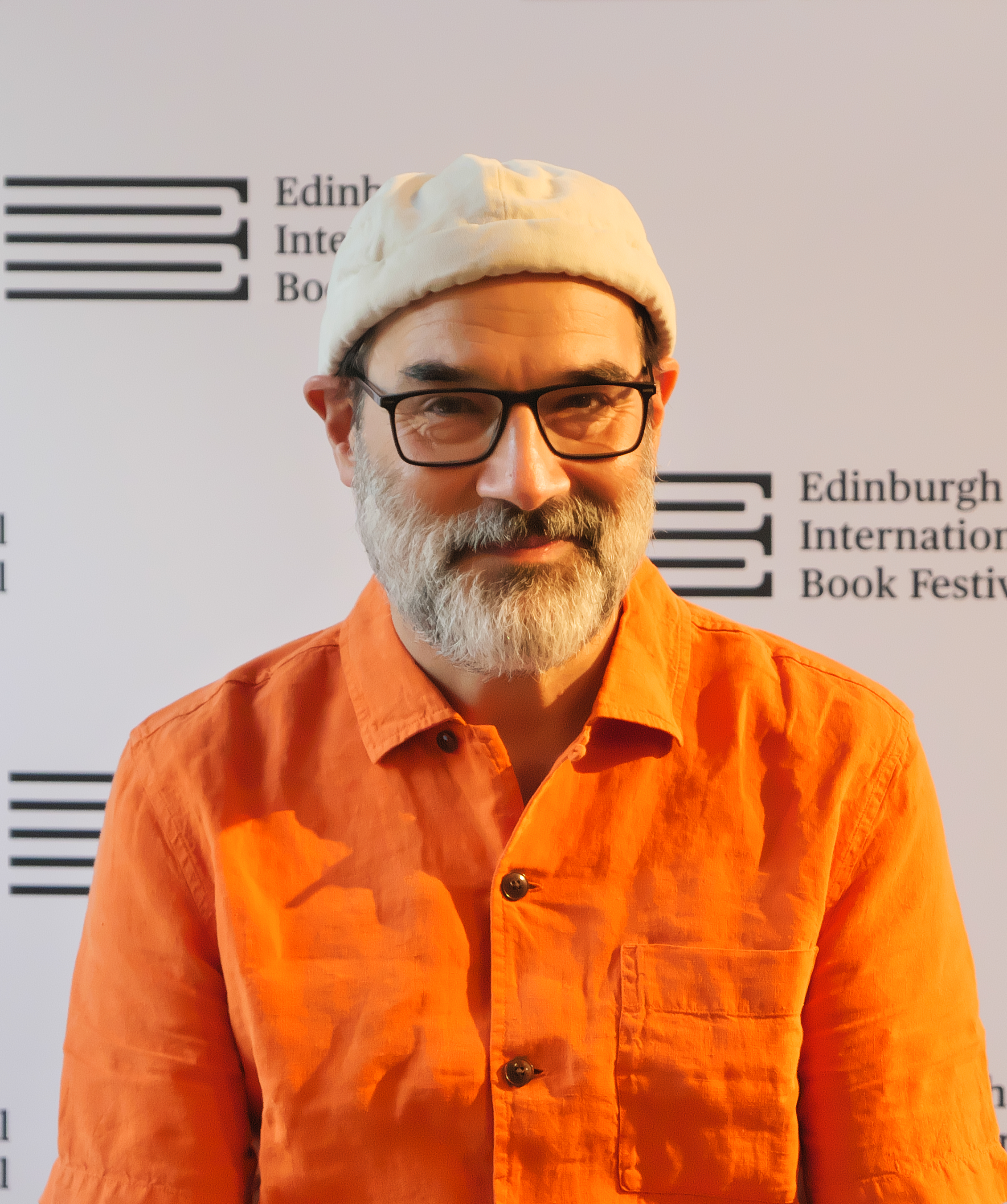
- Buxton at the 2025 Edinburgh International Book Festival
- Born: Adam Offord Buxton; 7 June 1969 (age 57); Shepherd's Bush, London, England
- Education: Windlesham House School; Westminster School; University of Warwick; Cheltenham College of Art
- Occupations: Actor; comedian; podcaster; writer
- Years active: 1995–present
- Spouse: Sarah Evans-Lombe (m. 2001)
- Children: 3
- Website: adam-buxton.co.uk

Adam Offord Buxton (born 7 June 1969) is an English comedian, podcaster and actor. With the filmmaker Joe Cornish, he is part of the comedy duo Adam and Joe. They presented the Channel 4 television series The Adam and Joe Show (1996–2001) and the BBC Radio 6 Music series Adam and Joe (2007–2009, 2011).

Since 2015, Buxton has produced The Adam Buxton Podcast, in which he interviews comedians, authors, musicians and celebrities. He has appeared on panel shows including Would I Lie To You?, Never Mind the Buzzcocks, and 8 Out of 10 Cats Does Countdown. Buxton has produced music videos, including several collaborations with the band Radiohead. He has released the memoirs Ramblebook (2020) and I Love You, Byeee (2025) and an album, Buckle Up (2025).

== Early life and education ==
Buxton was born on 7 June 1969 in Shepherd's Bush, London, and spent some of his childhood in Wales. His father was the travel writer and wine critic Nigel Buxton, who later appeared on The Adam and Joe Show as "Baaad Dad". Adam's mother, Valerie (née Birrell), was Chilean. Buxton's parents met at an embassy in Tokyo in the early 1960s, while his mother was working as a stewardess for British Overseas Airways Corporation. They separated following financial problems.

Buxton was privately educated at Windlesham House School in Pulborough, West Sussex, then Westminster School, London. At Westminster, he befriended his future comedy partner Joe Cornish and the future documentarian Louis Theroux. He attended the University of Warwick for two terms before dropping out to study sculpture at Cheltenham College of Art.

== Career ==
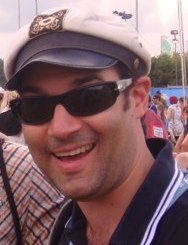
Buxton at Glastonbury Festival in 2009

=== With Joe Cornish ===
Buxton's first television appearance was in an episode of Channel 4's Takeover TV. In 1995, he hosted the show itself. Buxton and Joe Cornish formed the comedy duo Adam and Joe, and with the production company World of Wonder created The Adam and Joe Show for Channel 4. It ran for four series from 1996 to 2001. In 1999, The Adam and Joe Book, written by Buxton and Cornish, was published. Buxton and Cornish presented radio shows on Xfm and later BBC Radio 6 Music, which won a Silver Sony Award for Best Entertainment Programme in 2012.

=== Solo work ===
Buxton co-wrote and acted in the Channel 4 mini-series The Last Chancers, broadcast in December 2004. In April 2003, for the 10th anniversary of the record label Warp Records, Buxton held a retrospective show at the BFI Southbank cinema in London. In 2005, he performed character-driven comedy at Edinburgh Festival, with a show entitled I, Pavel, for which he grew a large beard.

Buxton appeared as a future version of himself in the BBC Two comedy series Time Trumpet, which began a six-part series in August 2006. In 2007, he portrayed the journalist Tim Messenger in Edgar Wright's film Hot Fuzz. He also appeared in the film Stardust, replacing Noel Fielding, who was ill. Buxton appeared in the BBC Three comedy sketch show Rush Hour, which premièred on 19 March 2007. He also featured in the 2007 film Son of Rambow as a teacher.

Buxton has collaborated on several occasions with the band Radiohead. He assisted with a 2007 webcast from their studio, directed the videos for their 2008 singles "Jigsaw Falling into Place" and "Nude" with Garth Jennings, and created a video vignette for their 2016 album A Moon Shaped Pool.

Buxton released a number of videos on YouTube, and was commissioned to produce a pilot for the BBC based around work of this kind. It was broadcast as MeeBOX on BBC Three in June 2008. Buxton guest-starred in the 2011 film The External World by David O'Reilly. In January 2010, Buxton appeared in the BBC comedy The Persuasionists.

In July 2012, Buxton appeared in a TV version of his tour Bug on Sky Atlantic, Adam Buxton's Bug. He started performing the show in 2007, and has continued to tour the Bug show as well as host it regularly at the BFI in London. He is the narrator of some books available on the Ladybird Classic Me Books iPad app, including "Goldilocks and the Three Bears" and "Three Little Pigs". He has narrated several other books on the Me Books app, such as The Great Explorer, The Brave Beast and The Lonely Beast by the children's illustrator and author Chris Judge. He also appeared in the Doctor Who audio drama The One Doctor by Big Finish Productions.

Buxton has appeared on Have I Got News for You, Never Mind the Buzzcocks, The IT Crowd, Don't Watch That, Watch This and Look Around You among others. He was also a panellist with Jonathan Ross for the Big Fat Quiz of the '80s. Buxton has guest-starred in several episodes of the comedy gameshow 8 Out of 10 Cats Does Countdown, featuring in Dictionary Corner. In 2015, Buxton became the voice of Messy for the children's TV animation Messy Goes to Okido, which aired on 7 September 2015 on CBeebies. In 2017, he made regular cameo appearances as "Jarhead" in the revamped version of The Crystal Maze. He appeared in the 2013 video game Lego City Undercover and the 2021 Illumination film Sing 2.

Buxton released an album, Buckle Up, in September 2025. It was produced by Joe Mount of the band Metronomy. The album, which featured humorous tracks and jingles in Buxton's typical style, received a positive reception overall -Clash gave it seven out of ten, writing that it was "a ridiculously entertaining listen from start to finish ... firmly in the realm of brilliantly bonkers sonic entertainment".

=== Podcasts ===
Since September 2015, Buxton has produced The Adam Buxton Podcast, in which he interviews cultural figures including comedians, writers and musicians. Guests have included Joe Cornish, Nile Rodgers, Paul McCartney, Chris Morris, Louis Theroux, Charlie Brooker, Jon Ronson, Caitlin Moran, Michael Palin and Brian Eno. The Adam Buxton Podcast won Best Online Comedy Talk Show at the Online Radio Awards, Podcast Champion at the British Podcast Awards and the Internet Award from Chortle.

Buxton launched a six-episode comedy podcast for Audible, Successpod, on 11 June 2026. It was produced by Mindhouse and has Buxton seeking success while competing with influencers and "looksmaxxing". It features interviews, jingles and sketches.

=== Books ===
Buxton's first memoir, Ramble Book, was published by HarperCollins in September 2020. It covers his childhood, including his time at Westminster School, his friendship with Cornish and Theroux, his relationship with his father, and his passion for 1980s pop culture, particularly the music of David Bowie. The audiobook, narrated by Buxton, features specially recorded jingles and a bonus podcast conversation with Cornish. Ramble Book was selected as a BBC Radio 4 "Book of the Week" and received positive reviews.

Buxton's second memoir, I Love You, Byeee, was published by Mudlark in May 2025. It covers topics such as his creative partnership with Cornish, the evolution of The Adam and Joe Show, parenthood and the death of his mother.

The book received largely positive reviews, with Stuart Jeffries writing for The Guardian: "I found Buxton’s self-deprecation endearing right up to the point that I realised he’s probably getting a huge advance for offloading his insecurities. And yet, he has written a celebrity memoir that does something extraordinary: it manages to be worth reading."

== Filmography ==
=== Movies ===
Year	Title	Role	Notes
2000	The Low Down	Adam	
2007	Hot Fuzz	Tim Messenger	
2007	Stardust	Quintus	
2007	Son of Rambow	Science Teacher	
2011	Attack the Block	Documentary Narrator	Voice only
2016	Sing	Stan	Voice only
2019	The Kid Who Would Be King	Stonehenge Tour Guide	
2021	Sing 2	Klaus Kickenklober / Stan	Voice only
2021	The Sparks Brothers	Himself	Documentary
2023	Scala!!!	Himself	Documentary
2026	Ladies and Gentlemen	Jack	In production
2026	Spook Train: Room Three - Ghosts & Chainsaws	The Father	Short Film

=== Television ===
Year	Title	Role	Notes
1996–2001	The Adam and Joe Show	Various roles	Also creator/writer
2000–2001	Randall & Hopkirk (Deceased)	Barry	2 episodes
2002–2005	Look Around You	Bunny Gnowles	TV series
2003	Adam and Joe Go Tokyo	Himself (Host)	8 episodes
2004	The Last Chancers	Ken Korda	TV series
2006	Time Trumpet	Various roles	6 episodes
2007	Rush Hour	Various roles	TV series
2010	The IT Crowd	Bill Crouse	1 episode
2010	The Persuasionists	Greg	6 episodes
2012	Adam Buxton's Bug	Himself (Host)	8 episodes
2013	It's Kevin	Various roles	6 episodes
2015–2019	Messy Goes to Okido	Messy	Voice role; 28 episodes
2017	Counterfeit Cat	Various voices	1 episode
2017–2020	The Crystal Maze	Jarhead the Riddle Master	14 episodes
2018	Apple & Onion	Apple's Dad	Voice role
2022	Max Williams Gets Grounded	Alexander	1 episode
2025	Richard Osman's House of Games	Himself	Panellist

=== Video games ===
Year	Title	Role	Notes
2013	Lego City Undercover	Bluffbeard, Barry Smith	Voice role

== Personal life ==
In 2001, Buxton married Sarah Evans-Lombe, the daughter of the High Court judge Edward Evans-Lombe. They have three children: two sons, Nat and Frank, and a daughter, Hope. The family resides in a farmhouse near Wymondham in Norfolk. Buxton often features his dog, Rosie, a whippet-poodle cross, in the intros and outros of his podcast, which he records while walking in the East Anglian countryside. He has publicly spoken about caring for his father, who died in 2015.

== Bibliography ==
- The Adam and Joe Book, Channel Four Books, 1999. ISBN 9780752213309
- Ramble Book: Musings on Childhood, Friendship, Family and 80s Pop Culture, HarperCollins, 2020. ISBN 9780008293352
- I Love You, Byeee: Rambles on DIY TV, Rockstars, Kids and Mums, HarperCollins/Mudlark, 2025. ISBN 9780008466992
