= Bemerton Street =

Street in Barnsbury, London

Coordinates: 51°32′17″N 0°07′08″W

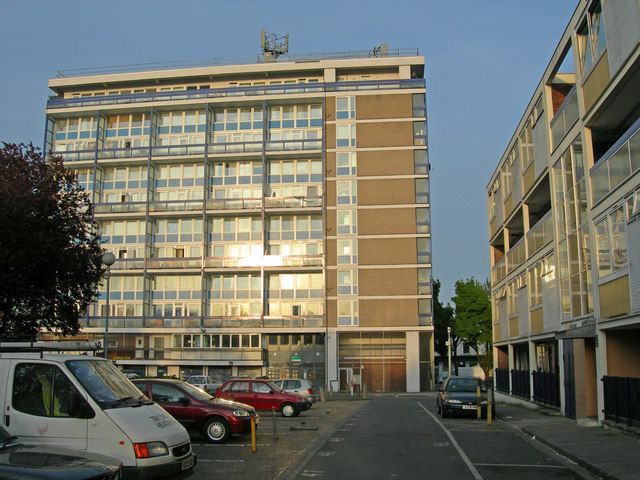
Bemerton Estate

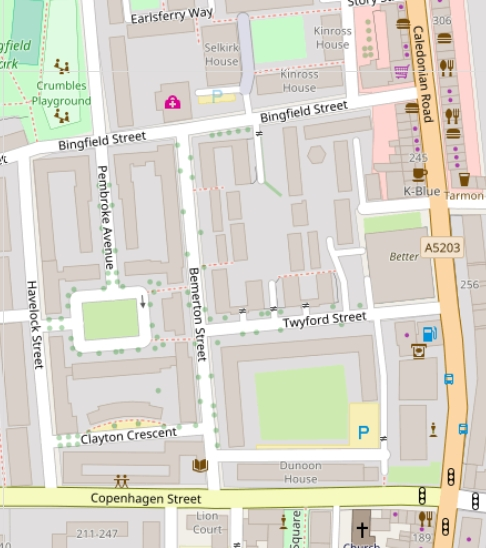
Bemerton Street map

Bemerton Street is a street in Barnsbury, King's Cross, in the London Borough of Islington. It runs from Bingfield Street in the north to Copenhagen Street in the south. It is joined on its eastern side by Twyford Street and on the western side by Clayton Crescent.

== History ==
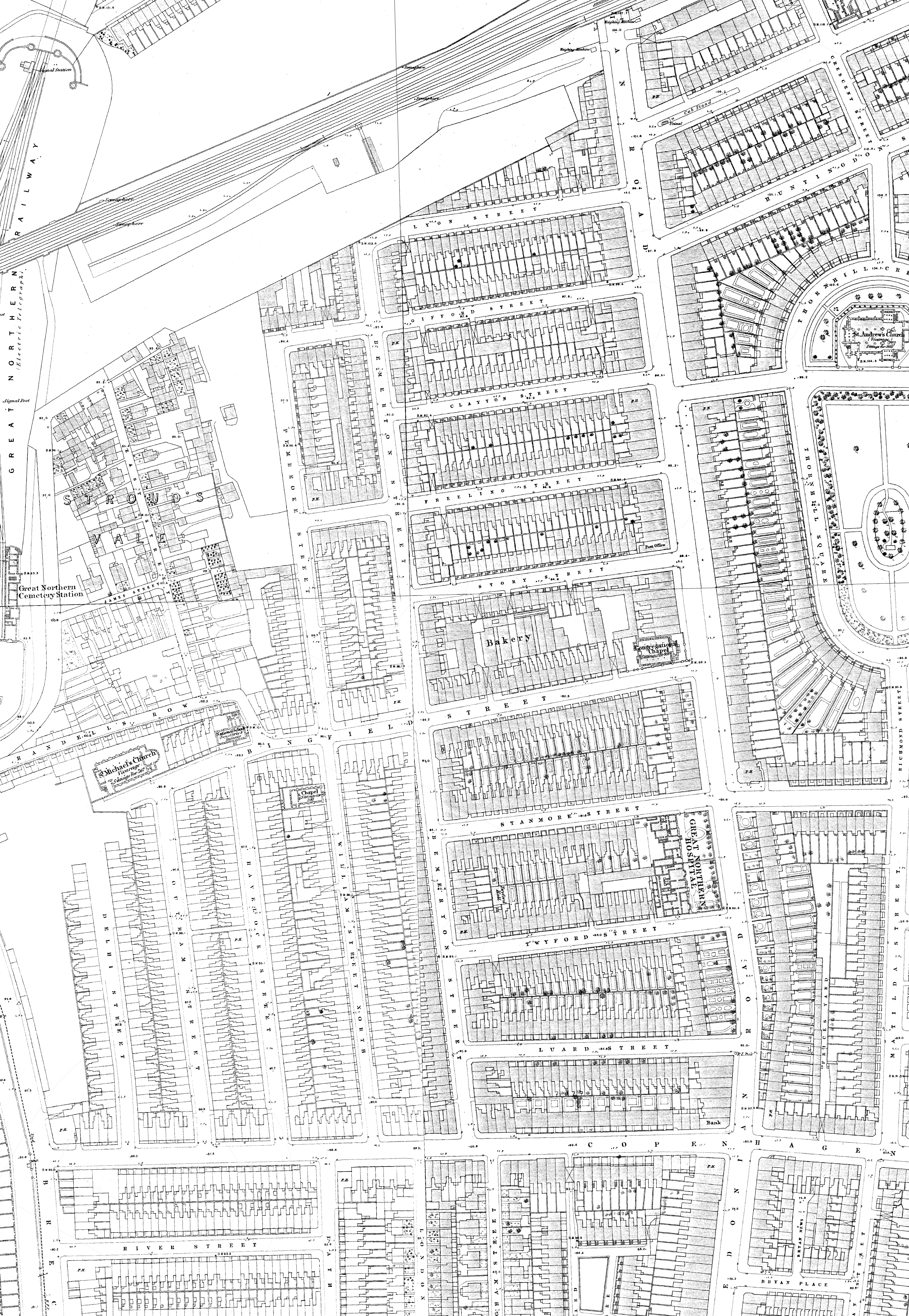
Bemerton Street on an Ordnance Survey map of the 1870s before the street was shortened.

Bemerton Street was built in 1852, one of several streets of terraced houses to the west of Caledonian Road. It originally ran further north to Lyon Street and was crossed by Gifford Street and Freeling Street and joined on its eastern side by Clayton Street, Story Street, Stanmore Street, Twyford Street, and Luard Street; but the northern part of Bemerton Street above Bingfield Street was demolished during post-Second World War redevelopment.

It was classed by Charles Booth as "Very poor, casual. Chronic want".

It was part replaced in the late 1960s and early 1970s by the Bemerton Estate north of Bingfield Street. New housing was also constructed east and west of the surviving part of Bemerton Street.
