= Adam and Joe (radio show) =

British comedy radio talk show

The Adam and Joe Show
- Genre: Comedy, talk, music
- Running time: 10.00 a.m. – 1.00 p.m.
- Country of origin: United Kingdom
- Language: English
- Home station: BBC Radio 6 Music
- Hosted by: Adam Buxton, Joe Cornish, Edith Bowman
- Produced by: Claire Slevin, Geoff Jein, Jude Adam & Ben Appleyard
- Executive producer: James Stirling
- Original release: 27 October 2007 – 31 December 2011 (as Adam & Edith: 29 December 2012)
- Audio format: Digital Audio Broadcasting; Streaming audio
- Website: Adam and Joe BBC 6 Music page
- Podcast: Adam and Joe

Adam and Joe is a radio show on BBC Radio 6 Music presented by Adam and Joe – comedians Adam Buxton and Joe Cornish. The show began in October 2007 and ran for three hours in a Saturday morning slot, originally from 9:00am to 12:00pm before moving to 10:00am to 1:00pm. After a hiatus from 26 December 2009, the series returned for three months on 2 April 2011. The show also briefly returned in late 2012, with Edith Bowman replacing Joe Cornish as Adam's co-presenter.

== History ==
Filling in for Ricky Gervais, Stephen Merchant and Karl Pilkington, Adam and Joe first appeared on the London-only radio station XFM in 2003, leading to a series of popular podcasts. They remained at the station for three years, with their final show broadcast on Christmas Eve 2006.

In August 2007, they presented the BBC Radio 6 Music weekday morning slot for two weeks, filling in for Shaun Keaveny. This led to their own Saturday breakfast show, starting 27 October 2007, as the pair were signed for a 1-year contract. In October 2008, their contract was extended for another year.

On 12 December 2009 podcast, it was announced that, as of Boxing Day, the show would be put on hold while Joe was away directing the film Attack the Block.

Adam and Joe returned to BBC Radio 6 Music for three special shows during the 2010 Glastonbury Festival, each running for 2 hours over the course of the three-day festival. In August Adam announced on his blog that they would be back in November, but the press release for Song Wars Volume 2 said they would be back in December. The final series started on 2 April 2011.

Both Buxton and Cornish reflected on the positive effect the show had on them and their relationship. Cornish told Channel 4: "Creatively, there are lots to be said for it really. You feel much closer to your audience on live radio and you can be a lot more relaxed and the funny things can be lots more spontaneous and therefore funnier. [...] The radio's, if not lucrative, a very rewarding hobby and it's the only thing that we do together now, so it keeps our friendship and banter alive."

Buxton said in an interview with the BBC: "This is going to sound a bit cheesy, but I swear that it's true – working at 6 Music is the most fun I've ever had working with Joe. After the death of our TV series, it's almost like we've become friends again. Being on the radio is nice – it's like hanging out again, fooling about and talking rubbish. I really enjoy it and look forward to it every week." On 8 June 2025, Buxton and Cornish reunited for a one-off broadcast on Virgin Radio.

== Features ==
=== Song Wars ===
Adam and Joe composed a song on a given theme (often using the program GarageBand). Listeners voted for their favourite. Both Adam and Joe occasionally made videos for their songs.

An album of the first 12 pairs of songs was released on 23 June 2008 exclusively on iTunes entitled Adam & Joe, Song Wars volume one. The album was reviewed by The Times and given 4 out of 5 stars.

A second album, Adam and Joe's Song Wars Volume 2 was released in December 2010.

Theme	Adam's Song	Vote %	Joe's/Garth's Song	Score
Band Aid (Shaun Keaveny feature)	"Jane's Brain"	60–40	"European Supermarket"	0–0 (Not counted)
Height	"Four Foot Club"	40–60	"T.A.L.L."	0–1
Public Transport	"Tiny Mobile Speakers"	32–68	"The Public Transport Song"	0–2
IKEA Meatball Cooking Instructions	"Meatballs"	32–68	"Meatballs"	0–3
Specific listeners	"James Rohan Neanderthal Man"	75–25	"Jack Meller's Song"	1–3
Climate Change (with whistling)	"Sincere Whistling Eco Song"	42–58	"Global Warming Song"	1–4
I'm A Celebrity...	"I'm a Celebrity Song"	26–74	"IACGMOOH"	1–5
New closing credit music for a film	"The Hours"	86–14	"The Shining"	2–5
Christmas	"Christmas Country Party Time"	29–71	"All Night Garage"	2–6
Ringtones	"You Got A Call"	79–21	"Phone Call", "You Funky Mother" and "Excuse Me"	3–6
Cryptozoology	"Loch Ness Song"	42–58	"Bigfoot"	3–7
Educational Song for Children	"Toothpaste Brush"	3–97	"The Right and Wrong Song"	3–8
Internet piracy	"Mind of a Pirate"	93–7	"Cautionary Song about Illegal Downloading"	4–8
Songs in a foreign language	"Penélope Cruz"	93–7	"The Actresses of France"	5–8
Songs featuring family members	"BaaadDad Rap" ft. Nigel Buxton	90–10	"I'm Still Standing" ft. Grandma Joan [By Garth Jennings]	1–0
Kate Nash Parody	"Bums and Binge Drinking"	62–38	"Itchy Bum"	6–8
Music festivals	"Festival Time"	75–25	"Glastonbury Song"	7–8
Family friendly erotica	"Dirty Robots"	36–64	"Dr. Sexy"	7–9
New birthday songs	"Happy Birthday Time"	83–17	"Birthday Reply Song"	8–9
Illness	"Flu"	25–75	"Hayfever" [By Garth Jennings]	1–1
The Quantum of Solace	"The Quantum of Solace"	64–36	"The Sontum of Quolace"	9–9
Grazia Magazine	"Too Beautiful for a Cranky Old Bag Like Me"	91–9	"This Week in Grazia"	10–9
Credit Crunch	"The Crunch"	32–68	"My Credit Crunchy Song" [By Garth Jennings]	1–2
Radiohead 'Reckoner' Remix	"It's Very Hard To Clear Radiohead"	65–35	"Thom in the Shower" [By Garth Jennings]	2–2
Scary Songs	"Nutty Room"	86–14	"Hallo Mr. Ghost"	11–9
Revised T.V. Theme Tunes	"Here's The News"	7–93	"Antiques Roadshow "	11–10
National Treasures	"Stephen Fry"	49–51	"La La Lumley"	11–11
Baz Luhrmann's Australia	"Australia Song"	68–32	"Australia"	12–11
Ultimate '80s song	"'80s Song"	57–43	"Incredible Song"	13–11
The Apprentice	"The Apprentice"	66–34	"Song for Margaret Mountford"	14–11
Bathtime Songs	"Special Bath"	67–33	"Bathtime for Bowie"	15–11
Royal Wedding	"The Royal Wedding Song"	59–41	"Right Royal Rave-up"	16–11
Toys and Games	"Party Pom Pom"	64–36	"Twister" [By Garth Jennings]	3–2

"Video Wars" was a competition set by Adam and Joe for listeners to create a music video for two Song Wars songs: either Adam's song 'Jane's Brain' or Joe's song 'Meatballs'. Reviewing the show in the Telegraph, Gillian Reynolds noted that the hosts described the videos as, "so good they surpassed what is on TV" and Reynolds adds, "They were right". The winner was Chris Salt for his Lego animation of 'Jane's Brain.'

=== Text the Nation ===
Listeners texted or emailed anecdotes or ideas on a subject given by Adam and Joe, which they referred to as 'The Nation's Favourite Feature'

A "Retro Text the Nation" segment was introduced as a podcast-only feature, in which listeners who did not listen live could contribute to Text The Nation. It was first introduced in February 2009 but from 12 September 2009, this was incorporated into their live show as it exceeded the limit of "new material" allowed to be produced on a BBC podcast.

=== Black Squadron ===
People who listened to the first half hour of the show live were known as "Black Squadron" – a title bestowed upon them in recognition of their ability to rise early on a Saturday morning – and were often given a task to do.

The emergence of "Black Squadron" gave rise to a number of variants on the theme:

- People who listened live and abroad were known as "Globe Squadron", however they could still consider themselves equivalent to a Black Squadron member in terms of operational duties.
- People who listened later in the week on iPlayer were known as "Phantom Squadron" or "Slack Squadron".
- People who listened to the podcast were known as "Pod Cats"; the original term "Slack Squadron" was considered derogatory.
- Listeners invited to the show recorded at the Camden Crawl were known as "Elite Squadron".
- Listeners called Caley were known as "Caley Squadron".
- Listeners who used Twitter were known as "Twit Squadron".
- People who read the blog were known as "Blog Squadron".

=== Pirate interludes ===
Adam and Garth Jennings also produced a series of pirate radio-style interludes with which they interrupted songs; as the radio station is DAB only, this was presented as a charming relic of the analogue listening experience. The clips were also used to cover up swearing in songs.

=== Stephenage ===
Stephenage, was a call-and-response game, whereby listeners shout out 'Stephen!' in a public place, and other listeners would reply with 'just coming!'. Thereby listeners could identify each other. This happened particularly at music gigs, though other situations were reported, such as a cinema and a museum, and recordings were sent in to the show.

The origins of "Stephen!" came from one of the show's 'Text the Nation' stories about juvenilia, submitted by a listener called Steve Curran. Curran related his youthful creation of a self-referential magazine, depicting him in the style of an "Action Force" soldier. The title of the magazine was "STEPHEN!".

=== Boggins ===
Voiced by Adam, Boggins was a friendly but filthy dog who arrived in the studio after Adam 'left', and went on to tell Joe how much he loved him but also what he had been rolling in and eaten. There was an ongoing debate as to whether Boggins should be put down or not. In the course of the Christmas show (broadcast 19 December 2009), a panto completed the Boggins story by revealing that he had been re-homed with a London street urchin. Joe was of the opinion that living on the street would result in the dog's death. During 2011 it became apparent that the child had a home and a family, who were desperate to get rid of Boggins as he was "tearing them apart as a family." Adam and Joe then took him to Glastonbury, and after the assembled listeners voted not to kill him, he was released into the mud and smells of the festival site.

=== Jingles ===
The show's idents and jingles were mostly created by Adam. Jingles were used to introduce the different sections and features of the show. From late 2008, listeners were invited to send in original or cover versions of existing jingles. Despite Adam's producing the vast majority of the jingles, a running joke was that Joe's Retro Text the Nation jingle was by far the most popular.

== Podcast ==
A podcast was produced beginning in January 2008. With the exception of Song Wars, all music is removed. At first it consisted of about half an hour of highlights of the show; since late 2008 it has been about an hour of highlights. A simple cut retaining just the talk lasts about an hour and a half.

There is a special spoken introduction and ending, and extra jingles are added between cuts. Beginning in February 2009 there was a podcast-only section called 'Retro Text The Nation' where podcast listeners' contributions to the previous week's Text The Nation were read out. Since late September 2009, this feature has transferred over to the live show, while being retained as part of the podcast.

The podcast featured in the top ten of the iTunes Comedy Podcast Chart.

While Adam and Joe were on their summer break in 2009, seven Song Wars Classics (or KQLLASSIXCQS) podcasts were released weekly in which the boys talked about their songs in a 'ludicrous way,' and including their normal, rambling chit-chat. The themes were as follows: Family Friendly Erotica, Revised T.V. Theme Tunes, Kate Nash Parody Songs, Quantum of Solace, Internet Piracy, Grazia Magazine, and Free Choice – Adam's Flu Song and Joe's 'Umm, err symphony.'

The songs were available as MP3 file downloads from their blog.

== Guests ==
Garth Jennings stood in for Joe on a few occasions, and took part in Song Wars in his place. For most of 2010, Andrew Collins and Richard Herring hosted Adam and Joe's morning slot. Collins and Herring continued a few of the Adam Joe's features including 'Song Wars' altered to 'Diary Wars' (in which both presenters would read out excerpts from their own teenage diaries), and 'Text the Nation' as 'Text the Station'. Collins and Herring have appealed to listeners to create radio-jingles, this much in the same spirit as Adam and Joe's feature.

Adam and Joe show interviewed several celebrity guests, including Sir Roger Moore, Redd Pepper, and Seasick Steve. Frank Skinner and Lauren Laverne dropped by for a brief chat during one of the Christmas shows. Adam and Joe also conducted informal interviews with bands such as Fleet Foxes when broadcasting from festivals.

== Awards ==
The show won a Broadcasting Press Guild Award for Radio Programme of the Year in 2008, and three silver Sony Awards in 2009; two for the programme in the "Entertainment" and "Comedy" categories, and one for the "Video Wars" slot in the "Competition" category. In 2010, the Adam and Joe show was awarded the Sony Gold Award for Best Comedy, the judges describing the show as "extremely funny, engaging and inclusive".

== Reception and popularity ==
The show received about 160,000 listeners a week, and 95,000 podcast downloads a week. A two-hour best-of compilation was aired on BBC Radio 2 on New Year's Day, 2009.

The show was warmly received by critics. Luke Lewis, for the NME, wrote: 'Without fanfare, their BBC show has quietly become essential listening, woven into the comforting fabric of Saturday mornings.' James Delingpole, in The Times noted: Listening to the show is like sitting in on a pub conversation between two extremely witty, frivolous, pop-culture-literate mates.'

Lesley Douglas, former controller of 6 Music, wrote in The Guardian: 'On 6 Music, Adam and Joe lay bare the mechanisms of radio to great comic effect.' In the same newspaper, Gareth McLean claimed 'They don't get the recognition that they deserve.' Similarly, Gillian Reynolds, in The Daily Telegraph, hailed the pair: 'Adam and Joe deserve a big audience but I hope they don't get one. They are too funny, inventive, disrespectful, joyous. They are also intelligent [...] But if Radio 1, or the new Capital, or Radio 2, or even Radio 4 in one of its desperately "young" moods were to sign them up, they would change, become frantic, be obliged to fit in. At the moment they chat without putting each other down. They laugh as if they mean it. They are not mean. This attracts amiable listeners [...] How cheering to have some signals from a radio world beyond celebs, Olympics and the new football season.'
