= Adam and Joe Go Tokyo =

BBC television series

- Starring: Adam Buxton; Joe Cornish
- Country of origin: United Kingdom
- No. of episodes: 8

Production
- Running time: 25 Minutes

Original release
- Network: BBC Three
- Release: 30 May – 25 July 2003

Adam and Joe Go Tokyo is a series of eight episodes created for BBC Three (also airing in full on BBC One at a later time slot as promotion for the new channel). It stars Adam Buxton and Joe Cornish of The Adam and Joe Show and aired from 30 May 2003 to 25 July 2003. The aim of the show is to offer an alternative insight into the lives of Tokyo's citizens, with the obligatory look at a number of gadgets and toys along the way. The show takes the format of a mature Blue Peter outlining many pastimes of the average (or less so) Japanese person, everything from competitive speed eating to manga cosplay. Each episode would end with a Japanese band joining the show to perform.

== Gaijin Invasion ==
In each episode, Adam and Joe document their attempts to become "Big in Japan". In one episode, they resort to busking in a local park. They perform an unnamed tribute to Tokyo wearing sneakers and black diving suits. As luck would have it, they are spotted by somebody working for a Japanese music television show and are asked to participate in it.

== Guests ==
Each week there were around two guests on the show ranging from professional cosplayers to the Japanese expert on fish. mo

== Episode details ==
No.	Directed by	Written by	Original release date
1	Becky Martin	Adam Buxton and Joe Cornish	30 May 2003
In their first attempt to get big in Japan, the pair pose as celebrities at Shibuya Crossing. Guests include inventor Dr Nakamatsu and comedy duo Tetsu and Tomo. Adam and Joe also explore the cosplay scene at a convention. Music from Polysics
2	Becky Martin	Adam Buxton and Joe Cornish	6 June 2003
Trying to further their attempts in getting famous in Japan, Adam and Joe attend a book signing with glamour duo The Kano Sisters. Fish expert Sakana Kun is in the studio, as are Michael Arias and Shinichiro Watanabe, who discuss the Animatrix. Music from Loop Junktion.
3	Becky Martin	Adam Buxton and Joe Cornish	13 June 2003
This time in their attempts to get big in Japan, Adam and Joe go to the premiere of The Matrix Reloaded in eye-catching outfits. Keiji Oguni, Shinya Takahashi (speed eaters) has a competition, Daisuke Inoue (the inventor of karaoke) is interviewed and judge Adam and Joe's karaoke skills, and music from Dogggy Style (band).
4	Becky Martin	Adam Buxton and Joe Cornish	20 June 2003
Nobumichi Tosa (Meiwa Denki), HALCALI (band).
5	Becky Martin	Adam Buxton and Joe Cornish	4 July 2003
Susumu Kurobe (original Ultraman), Tokyo Shock Boys (performing artists), Guitar Wolf (band).
6	Becky Martin	Adam Buxton and Joe Cornish	11 July 2003
Kenta Fukasaku (Battle Royale II: Requiem director), Tatsuya Fujiwara (actor), Gaijin Invasion, Hoover's Ooover (miscredited as Hoover Over) (band).
7	Becky Martin	Adam Buxton and Joe Cornish	18 July 2003
Dandy Sakano (comedian), Mc Simoneta (band), DJ Takeshit (band).
8	Becky Martin	Adam Buxton and Joe Cornish	25 July 2003
Papaya Suzuki & Oyaji Dancers (performing artists), Plus-Tech Squeeze Box (band).

== See also ==
- Japanorama
