= Takeover TV =

- Genre: Public access; Comedy
- Created by: Fenton Bailey; Randy Barbato
- Based on: Manhattan Cable
- Presented by: Adam Buxton; Joe Cornish (2002)
- Country of origin: United Kingdom
- Original language: English
- No. of seasons: 3

Production
- Running time: 45 minutes (inc. adverts) (1995)
- Production company: World of Wonder Productions

Original release
- Network: Channel 4 (1995-1996); E4 (2002)
- Release: 6 May 1995 – 2002

Related
- The Adam and Joe Show

Takeover TV is a Channel 4 public-access television series first broadcast in the UK in 1995, with a second series in 1996, and a third in 2002 broadcast on E4. It is known as the television show that first gave a break in television to Adam Buxton and Joe Cornish. It also featured early work from Edgar Wright, Graham Norton, Garth Jennings, and Alexander Armstrong, amongst others.

== History ==
Fenton Bailey and Randy Barbato set up the production company World Of Wonder and placed an advert in the NME asking for 'weird, funny and original' clips made by members of the public, these clips would become the basis for Takeover TV. It has since been described by Barbato as "YouTube before YouTube". Bailey and Barbato were NYU film students who had settled in East Village, Manhattan and produced Manhattan Cable of which Bailey said "it had passion, vision and originality.. the stuff was very anarchic, punk, DIY, breaking the rules" and featured a young RuPaul. Bailey didn't have any trouble translating the show across the Atlantic to the UK, he said "I expected a more reserved response but in fact there's a much broader range than in Manhattan Cable. If the American sensibility is drag queens extraordinaire, the British sensibility is much more Pythonesque. I've shown a few episodes to people in the States and it's 'Oh my god!'. They can't get round it at all." One presenter in the first series was called Norman Sphincter whose act was to move his bare backside to lip sync with Loyd Grossman or Sean Connery with only a carrot or cigarette to cover his sphincter from the camera, another presenter was a cat, according to Adam Buxton some "feminist stripping witches were going to present the very last programme, but it was all looking a bit sleazy so they pulled them and I got asked to fill in at the last moment."

Buxton had sent in some videos he had made with Joe Cornish and was employed first as a researcher, and then as a presenter. He presented the first and last episodes of the first series and then seasons two and three. The first series Buxton describes as "a diverse mix of serious video diary pieces, music, animation, pranks, stunts and sketches, all made by non professionals on home video equipment". Other contributors included Garth Jennings, who, with Andrew Larbi made a short film called One Cold Eskimo. Edgar Wright, who sent in a short film, and Leigh Francis filmed himself as Bjork "lying in the shower in his pants making funny noises". One sketch featured Graham Norton playing numerous characters including a roving reporter, another featured Ben Miller and Alexander Armstrong playing Scandinavian buskers.

The second and third series concentrated more on the comedic elements that were present in series one. Buxton filmed his links from his flat in Brixton Hill on a camcorder in front of a set he built using old TVs playing feedback patterns he had made when he was at art school. Buxton said he "presented for a while before I asked Joe to help me out". Cornish, who was working as a production assistant for a film company at the time, told Vice "The moral of the story is to always be productive. It was better for me to be working on late-night comedy than in a film production company because I was actually making stuff." Fellow contributor Ben Miller said that he personally "had no formal training in anything – writing, acting, directing...I'd rather learn while I'm doing it. I like the idea that you have something to express and you're searching for a way to express it".

The programme was decommissioned in 1996, but Buxton and Cornish remained at Channel 4 with their new series, The Adam and Joe Show, which launched that December. However, in January 2001, it was announced that the show would be returning, moving from Channel 4 to its new spin-off pay entertainment channel, E4. By the time of the third series revival rather than requesting people send in tapes E4 were able to set up an accompanying website for viewers to submit video spoofs.

== Critical reception ==
Despite being a vehicle for amateur videos The Independent on 12 July 1996 criticised the programme for appearing too professional compared to Made in the USA which had debuted stateside previously. They made the case that the programme has "quality control" whereas "in real public access television, the notion of weeding out the incompetent, the marginal and the impossibly eccentric is anathema. So what we have instead is You've Been Framed!, the only difference being that the entertainment is caught on film deliberately rather than by chance: I've Framed Myself."
