= Bemerton Estate =

Housing estate in London

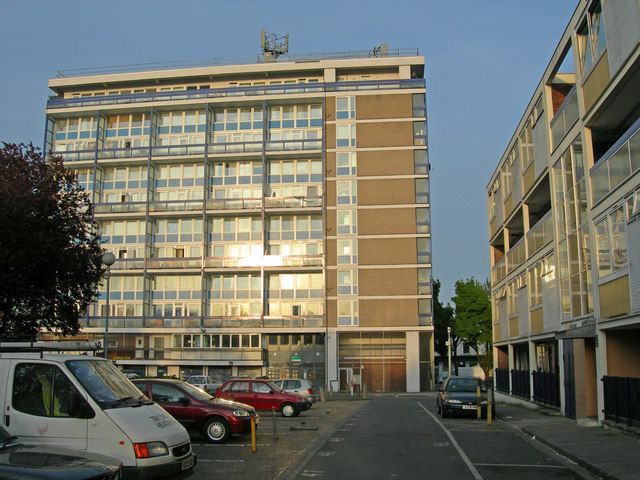
- Flats on the Bemerton Estate

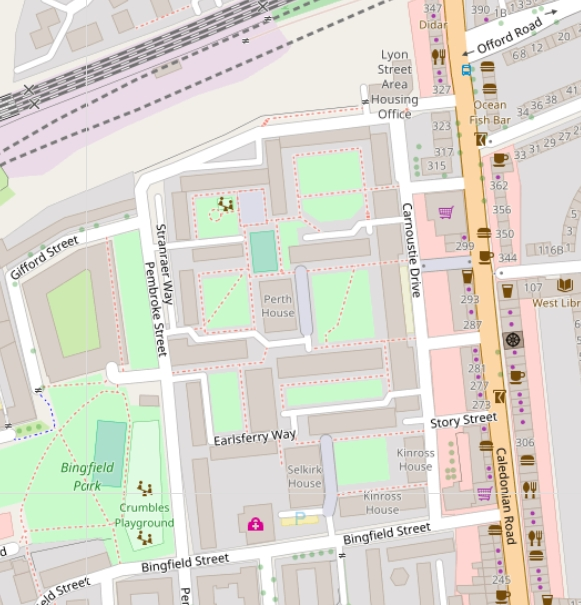
- Bemerton Estate (centre) map showing the principal buildings.
- Interactive map of Bemerton Estate

General information
- Location: Islington, London, England
- Status: Completed

Construction
- Constructed: 1969–1973

Other information
- Governing body: Islington London Borough Council

The Bemerton Estate is a social housing estate to the north of Bingfield Street and west of Caledonian Road, in the London Borough of Islington. It was built between 1969 to 1973, and named after Bemerton Street, the northern part of which it replaced.

The estate comprises 737 homes, across 14 high-rise and low-rise building blocks. While facing challenges in the past, including anti-social behaviour and potential demolition plans, the estate saw significant positive improvements through the 2000s and 2010s. This was supported by its inclusion in the King's Cross Regeneration Area, its management under the Bemerton Villages Management Organisation (BVMO) between 2000 and 2015, and various local development schemes.

As of March 2025, amenities on the estate include:

- The Jean Stokes Community Center, which serves as a multi-purpose community hub. It hosts adult learning classes, local councillor surgeries, and community coffee mornings and bingo. Some of the office space is allocated to local voluntary organisations to work out of, including Age UK Islington, Asperger London Area Group, Help on Your Doorstep and Stuart Low Trust.
- The Bemerton Children's Centre, a council-run nursery. In February 2022, it received an "Outstanding" rating from Ofsted.
- Artbox London, an art studio charity that helps learning disabled and neurodivergent artists come together to explore art, build friendships and learn new skills.
- Bingfield Primary Care Centre, a GP practice run by the Islington GP Federation that was rated 'Good' by the Care Quality Commission in July 2023.
- Cally Pool & Gym, a leisure centre run by Better with a 25-metre pool, a 20-metre teaching pool, and a gym.

Community initiatives include Jean's Café, a volunteer lunch facility opened in February 2025, and the Bemerton wildflower meadow at the corner of Bemerton Street and Copenhagen Street.

In Autumn 2026, the council plans to build 54 new homes and a new flexible retail space in the south section of the estate.

== History ==
Initial phases of the development included the construction of Perth and Orkney Houses. These replaced dilapidated terrace slums, and there was significant demand to secure a place within these new dwellings. With building continuing until 1973, the estate ultimately comprised 737 homes across 14 blocks.

=== The Bemerton Villages Management Organisation ===
The Bemerton Villages Management Organisation (BVMO) was established as the tenant management organisation for the estate in 2000. Its initial responsibilities were for repairs and maintenance, caretaking and ground maintenance. Given the size of the estate, the BVMO was the largest tenant management organisation in Islington.

In September 2011, residents voted to transfer a range of further service responsibilities to the BVMO from the council's home management organisation, Homes for Islington. These responsibilities included communal heating, lumber collection, estate parking, and estate lighting, adding to the existing services managed by the BVMO such as caretaking, refurbishing void properties, and lift maintenance.

In August 2015, Islington Council terminated its agreement with the BVMO and assumed its management functions over child safeguarding concerns. In 2016, members of the BVMO attempted to raise support for returning management responsibilities to the BVMO, but this did not succeed.

=== Redevelopment proposals ===
In the 2000s, the estate faced challenges related to communal area maintenance, crime and antisocial behaviour. Between 2005 and 2010, £4.4 million of Decent Homes Funding was spent on the estate to tackle these problems.

In 2010 however, some of these problems remained. Combined with pressure on the council to deliver additional council homes, this led to a public consultation on demolishing and redeveloping the estate. Residents were split on the decision, with 58% in favour of demolition and 37% wanting no change. The mixed reaction from residents, and changes to the financial viability of the scheme resulted in the demolition proposals being scrapped. Councillor Paul Convery, said at the time that "people living on the Bemerton like their flats and the vast majority of them are very relieved by our decision".

In 2011, the Lyon Street housing office to the north of the estate was closed. Between July 2013 and December 2015, new homes were built on this site. The block contains 18 two-bedroom units and 2 one-bedroom units for residents over 55.

In 2019, Islington Council proposed building new council homes in the south part of the estate, which includes Orkney House, Dunoon House and Caithness House. Updates to these plans were released in 2020 and 2022. A further public consultation was held in 2024, and the council plans to build 54 new homes between Autumn 2026 and Winter 2028.

Alongside the above, since the early 2000s the nearby King's Cross Central area has been redeveloped. As of March 2025, the nearest redeveloped site is the Author King's Cross flat complex, and the closest proposals are 190m from the Bemerton Estate on 176-178 York Way.

== In popular culture ==
The Bemerton Estate is featured in the 2011 British science fiction comedy film, Attack the Block. While the film's is set in a fictional housing estate in South London, the Bemerton Estate in North London served as the setting for numerous exterior scenes.

The estate is featured prominently in series one, episode three of The Secret History of Our Streets. The episode covers Caledonian Road and the nearby area.

The estate was the focus of a Channel 5 documentary aired in 2020, The Mega Council Estate Next Door that compared the estate with nearby Barnsbury. Channel 5 said the series intended to be "celebrating the spirit, talents and sense of community of the people of Islington". However, some residents complained the documentary portrayed the estate in an overly negative light. One resident featured on the programme said the producers "wanted us to look like a bunch of poor council girls being jealous of fancy houses – which isn’t true".
