= Okido (magazine) =

British children's magazine

OKIDO
- Categories: Children's science magazine
- Frequency: Monthly
- Founder: Rachel Ortas and Sophie Dauvois
- Founded: 2007
- Country: United Kingdom
- Based in: London
- Website: Okido

OKIDO is a monthly art and science publication for young children in the UK. The magazine was published by Doodle Productions Ltd and created in 2007 by artist Rachel Ortas and scientist Sophie Dauvois. They are assisted by art directors Alex Barrow and Maggie Li.

== History ==
OKIDO magazine, an independent publication, was started by parents from a kitchen table in Brixton in 2007. It was designed to fire up young imaginations and spark a life-long love of art and science. OKIDO magazine is published monthly with a circulation of over 9,000.

The magazine was funded by a Wellcome Trust Small Arts Grant from 2007 until 2009, when OKIDO was funded by a Wellcome Trust Large Arts Grant. In 2011, OKIDO became self-funded. Starting in 2014, OKIDO was published by Doodle Productions Ltd.

== Content ==
Each issue starts with a story from Ortas's character Messy Monster and also includes science answers from Zim, Zam, Zoom, regular character features, stories, puzzles, doodles, games, activities, science experiments, a poem, a recipe and a pull-out card activity.

Regular character stories include "Messy Monster" by Rachel Ortas, "Zim Zam Zoom" by Alex Barrow, "Yoga Monkey" by Paul Noble, and "Squirrel Boy" by Beth Morrison. Each issue also includes stories from guest illustrators.

== Messy Goes to OKIDO ==
In 2015, Messy Goes to OKIDO, which has been developed from the magazine, was launched on the BBC's CBeebies channel as a 104-part television series aimed at three to five-year-old children. Series 2 began airing in 2018, while the Series 3 began airing in 2022.

The program has also helped to expand the Okido brand overseas, as it airs in numerous foreign nations and has dubs in over 10 different languages.
