= Messy Goes to OKIDO =

- "When you need to know, go to OKIDO". - Messy
- Genre: Children's animation
- Based on: OKIDO magazine by: Rachel Ortas; Sophie Dauvois
- Directed by: Liz Whitaker; Paul Donnellon
- Voices of: Adam Buxton; Kate Harbour; Shelley Longworth; Rob Rackstraw; Sam Ryder
- Theme music composer: Sam Britton and Will Worsley
- Opening theme: "Messy Goes to OKIDO"
- Ending theme: "Messy Goes to OKIDO" (instrumental)
- Country of origin: United Kingdom
- Original language: English
- No. of seasons: 3
- No. of episodes: 104

Production
- Executive producers: Julius Coke; Amanda Billings
- Producers: Genevieve Dexter; Alice Britton; Megan Martin
- Running time: 11 minutes (approx.)
- Production companies: Doodle Productions; Rooks Nest Entertainment; Eye Present (formerly Squint/Opera); WildBrain

Original release
- Network: CBeebies
- Release: 7 September 2015 – 18 January 2023

Messy Goes to OKIDO is a 2015 animated series for children, adapted from characters in OKIDO, a children's arts and science magazine. Inquisitive monster Messy, voiced by Adam Buxton, has adventures with his best friends Zoe and Felix in the colourful world of OKIDO. The first series aired in 2015 premiering on the BBC channel CBeebies, followed by the second in 2018, and the third in 2022. HBO Max and Serious Kids acquired worldwide distribution rights to all three seasons in 2022.

== Development ==
The concept was picked up by London-based CG studio Squint/Opera. Working with Squint/Opera the concept was developed and re-imagined as a 52 part children's show combining live action footage with 3D renderings of Messy, his friends and the world of OKIDO.

The show aims to tackle a scientific topic in each episode, beginning with a question posed by Messy, such as why do some things float and some things sink. He travels to OKIDO to discover the answers with the help of his friends Zoe & Felix and science trio Zim, Zam & Zoom who all have specific abilities which help them in their adventures.

== Characters ==
=== Messy ===
Messy (Adam Buxton) is a blue jerboa/bilby-like monster, excitable and curious. He lives underneath a bed and ventures out often to discover new things and learn. Although Messy has good intentions, his excitement often gets him into trouble; he cannot resist the urge to press buttons, and he can never get enough of eating socks (green ones are his favorite) and sandwiches. Whenever Messy finds something new that he is curious about, he travels to OKIDO to meet his friends and discover the answer.

=== Zoe ===
Zoe (Kate Harbour) is one of Messy's best friends who lives in OKIDO with her brother Felix. Zoe is very smart and sensible. She hates being late and getting lost but has a passion for gadgets and gizmos, such as her communications watch which she can use to call Zim, Zam & Zoom.

=== Felix ===
Felix (Shelley Longworth) is one of Messy's best friends who lives in OKIDO with his sister Zoe. Felix loves using his imagination, being inventive and being prepared. He always packs a rucksack with useful things to help on their adventures.

=== Zim ===
Zim (Rob Rackstraw) is a yellow talking computer with a white screen who knows a lot about science. He works in the ZZZ Tower with Zam and Zoom. Zim is not very good at practical things like reading maps and this often leads to disagreements with Zam. Whenever Zim gets confused his screen starts buffering.

=== Zam ===
Zam (Kate Harbour) is a triangle-shaped engineer who is brilliant at fixing things and she also works in the ZZZ Tower. She is quite bossy and sometimes tells Zim off if he is getting in the way. Zam uses her tools to make all kinds of gadgets and vehicles. Zam also loves doing experiments, particularly when they blow up.

=== Zoom ===
Zoom is Zim and Zam's lab assistant. He is blue in the magazine but pink in this series. He can morph into any shape he wants as long as it is not bigger than his body. This is very useful when the OKIDO gang are on an adventure. He does not speak but can make noises. Zoom is the only character, aside from Messy, to appear in every episode. He works in the ZZZ tower with Zim and Zam.

=== Other characters ===
Mayor Oki is the Mayor of OKIDO, has his own TV show called OKIDO Today and a private jet 'Mayor-Force-One'.

Lolly runs the ice-cream van and beach cafe. She is very friendly and chilled out.

Geoffrey owns the OKIDO cafe. He used to be an actor but one day forgot his lines and has never acted again.

Snowden is a friendly, fun-loving monster that lives in the snowy mountains.

Fluff is a big white cloud from the mountains. She is calm, sweet, and kind.

Stan Tall, also known as Stan, is OKIDO's biggest, strongest robot.

Weatherbot is a robot that controls weather. At one point, Messy accidentally pressed its extreme weather mode button.

== Albums ==
1. Science Songs

== Series overview ==
Series	Episodes	Originally released	
Series	Episodes	First released	Last released
1	52	7 September 2015	6 June 2016
2	26	22 October 2018	30 October 2019
3	26	14 November 2022	18 January 2023

== Episodes ==
=== Series 1 (2015–2016) ===
No. overall	No. in season	Title	Written by	Original release date	Prod. code
1	1	"Moon Landing"	Melanie Halsall	7 September 2015	101
Messy accidentally drops his jam sandwich, but then wonders why it fell downwards instead of upwards.
2	2	"Felix Finds His Voice"	Dan Berlinka and Sean Carson	8 September 2015	102
Messy hears a bird outside his window, but he cannot understand what the bird is saying.
3	3	"OKIDO in Bloom"	Emma Boucher	9 September 2015	103
Messy watches his sandcastle get washed away by rain.
4	4	"Tastebuddies"	Samantha Hill	10 September 2015	104
Messy discovers that things simply don't taste the same when he has a cold.
5	5	"Messy's Lost Balloon"	Gabby Dawnay	11 September 2015	105
Messy finds out what is inside balloons to make them float up high into the sky.
6	6	"Float or Sink"	Stuart Beale	14 September 2015	106
Messy wonders why his rubber duck floats instead of sinking.
7	7	"Bouncing Batwaves"	Charles Hodges	15 September 2015	107
Messy is having fun blowing loud notes through his horn.
8	8	"Cavity Cave"	Andrew Barnett Jones and Ciaran Murtagh	16 September 2015	108
Messy brushes his teeth, but wonders why toothpaste and a toothbrush are used.
9	9	"A Rainy Sunny Day"	Neil Bennun	17 September 2015	109
Messy can see something amazing outside his window, which is a beautiful arch of colours.
10	10	"Messy-morphosis"	Stuart Beale	18 September 2015	110
Messy cannot find his caterpillar friends.
11	11	"Thirsty Robot"	Melanie Halsall	21 September 2015	111
Messy cannot figure out why his cart is not moving.
12	12	"Mr Kite Takes Flight"	Ian Carney	22 September 2015	112
Messy goes to OKIDO to find out why the wind is so blowy.
13	13	"Weepy"	Rebecca Stevens	23 September 2015	113
Messy finds a very dusty sock underneath his bed, but wonders why does it make him teary.
14	14	"Gills"	Samantha Hill	24 September 2015	114
Messy wants to know how his goldfish friend can stay underwater for so long.
15	15	"Paperchase"	Andrew Barnett Jones and Ciaran Murtagh	25 September 2015	115
Messy has a pair of green socks waiting for him. He eats one, but he cannot find the second one.
16	16	"Lolly's Keys"	Neil Richards	28 September 2015	116
Messy is having breakfast and sees objects on the fridge, wondering why don't they fall off.
17	17	"Ice Ice Messy"	Darren Jones	29 September 2015	117
Messy's new friend is in a spot of hot bother. They go on an icy adventure to help.
18	18	"A Messy Night Before Christmas"	Dan Berlinka and Sean Carson	15 December 2015	118
Messy cannot wait for Christmas Day. He learns that a good night's sleep is important.
19	19	"A Night at the Circuits"	Neil Richards	30 September 2015	119
Messy and his friends explore the electrical world of circuits to fix Zoe's communicator.
20	20	"Messy-Power"	Emma Boucher	1 October 2015	120
Messy goes to OKIDO and finds out about electricity.
21	21	"Planet Wobble"	Joel Jessup	2 October 2015	121
Messy and friends rocket into space, but Messy sends OKIDO's seasons into chaos.
22	22	"Alien Television"	Neil Richards	5 October 2015	122
Messy and his friends have an adventure with aliens on OKIDO telly and skateboards in the satellite.
23	23	"Comet"	Neil Richards	6 October 2015	123
Messy has to save OKIDO from a falling comet before his bedtime.
24	24	"Bee Story"	Rebecca Stevens	7 October 2015	124
Messy and his friends set off in search of bees.
25	25	"Tiny Sandwiches"	Neil Bennun	8 October 2015	125
Messy joins Zim and his friends on a mission inside a sandwich to photograph some atoms.
26	26	"Big Hearted Messy"	Dan Berlinka and Sean Carson	9 October 2015	126
Messy and friends need to get Lofty's heart pumping and celebrate his birthday.
27	27	"Building Bridges"	Andrew Barnett Jones and Ciaran Murtagh	2 May 2016	127
Messy and his friends are joined by a group of robots when they build a bridge.
28	28	"Cheesy Feet"	Gabby Dawnay	3 May 2016	128
Messy thinks smelly socks and cheesy feet are great, until Lofty's feel start to smell.
29	29	"Colours"	Jon Groves	4 May 2016	129
Messy is left feeling blue when the vacubots suck all the colour out of OKIDO.
30	30	"Habitat"	Neil Bennun	5 May 2016	130
When the Cloudship soars off, it is up to Messy to return it to its natural habitat.
31	31	"Mayor Force One"	Neil Bennun	6 May 2016	131
Messy gets to fly Mayor Oki's plane, but he crash-lands it in a tree.
32	32	"Vivienne Blows Her Top"	Rebecca Stevens	9 May 2016	132
Messy and his friends have animals to save when Vivienne Volcano gets a rumbly tummy.
33	33	"Fossil Puzzle"	Ian Carney	10 May 2016	133
Messy is bored of his dino-jigsaw, so his friends help him with a real prehistoric puzzle.
34	34	"Funny Bones"	Emma Boucher	11 May 2016	134
Lofty has a broken finger. Messy saves the day and discovers that bones are amazing.
35	35	"Messy Antics"	Stuart Beale	12 May 2016	135
During Mayor Oki's birthday picnic, Messy gets into trouble with Zam's shrinkasizer.
36	36	"Spidermessy"	Stuart Beale	13 May 2016	136
Messy goes to OKIDO and helps his friends fix Loopy Bridge.
37	37	"Dizzy"	Jon Groves	16 May 2016	137
Messy and friends go on a rollercoaster and figure out why Stan Tall spins around so much.
38	38	"Me & My Shadow"	Dan Berlinka and Sean Carson	17 May 2016	138
When Messy breaks the lighthouse, things get shady, but he and his friends save the day.
39	39	"A Case of the Lightnings"	Neil Bennun	18 May 2016	139
Messy and friends visit Fluff the Cloud's family.
40	40	"Okidoasis"	Samantha Hill	19 May 2016	140
Messy goes to OKIDO to help his friends solve the mystery of the dried-up oasis.
41	41	"Messy Music"	Jon Groves	20 May 2016	141
Messy and friends must play the OKIDO concert.
42	42	"A Sock Too Far"	Neil Richards	23 May 2016	142
Messy and his friends go camping with a robot who can do anything.
43	43	"Rumbly Tummy"	Gabby Dawnay	24 May 2016	143
Messy's tummy is rumbling and so is Lofty the giant's.
44	44	"Rub-a-Dub Messy"	Sean Carson	25 May 2016	144
Messy and friends discover how levers work.
45	45	"Splish Splash Splosh"	Rebecca Stevens	26 May 2016	145
Messy and his friends must help to wash OKIDO clean of all the bad germs flying around.
46	46	"Eye Spy"	Sean Carson	27 May 2016	146
Messy and friends explore the forest with Tweedy.
47	47	"Snowflakes"	Neil Richards	30 May 2016	147
Messy wants to chill out in the snow, and gets lucky when the snowflakes come out to play.
48	48	"Wiggly Worms"	Emma Boucher	31 May 2016	148
When Mayor Oki's pumpkins are not big enough Messy and his friends muck in to save the day.
49	49	"Second Chances"	Andrew Barnett Jones and Ciaran Murtagh	1 June 2016	149
Messy helps his friends find Zoe's lost communicator, which has ended up in the recycling.
50	50	"Messy Races"	Neil Bennun	2 June 2016	150
Messy and friends enter a race in OKIDO and the various vehicles speed off.
51	51	"Giant Messy"	Jon Groves	3 June 2016	151
Messy and friends go to the funfair and they end up in a giant mess with mini Mini.
52	52	"Tick Tock Messy"	Neil Richards	6 June 2016	152
Messy goes to OKIDO to play with Zim and Zam's new discovery.

=== Series 2 (2018–2019) ===
No. overall	No. in season	Title	Written by	Original release date	Prod. code
53	1	"Glow Messy"	Neil Richards	22 October 2018	201
Messy, Felix, Zoe and Zoom go in search of a light that never goes out.
54	2	"Vote OKIDO"	Neil Bennun	23 October 2018	202
Mayor Oki and Geoffrey make a lot of noise in an election for the next mayor of OKIDO.
55	3	"Snowden's Ear-mergency"	Neil Bennun	24 October 2018	203
Snowden has lost his pine cone ears and he cannot hear a thing.
56	4	"A Touch of Sock"	Neil Bennun	25 October 2018	204
Messy and his friends try to help a robot who has no sense of touch.
57	5	"Messy Has a Hoot"	Emma Boucher	26 October 2018	205
Messy and his friends go camping in OKIDO Forest and meet some nocturnal animals.
58	6	"Sparkly Messy"	Neil Richards	29 October 2018	206
An amazing cave may contain the perfect material for OKIDO's most famous sculptor, Zinnie.
59	7	"Journey to Socktropolis"	Emma Boucher	30 October 2018	207
Zam tries out her new navigator, which the friends use to find Socktropolis.
60	8	"Messy Migration"	Gabby Dawnay	31 October 2018	208
A little turtle gets stranded on the beach in OKIDO.
61	9	"The Sun in a Bucket"	Neil Richards	1 November 2018	209
When the sun mysteriously disappears, Messy zooms up to space to find out what is going on.
62	10	"Ex-Static Messy"	Rebecca Stevens	2 November 2018	210
Messy's fur is all spikey and everything's getting stuck together.
63	11	"Nimby Goes to Cloud Club"	Gabby Dawnay	5 November 2018	211
Messy and his friends come up with a plan to help Nimby overcome his nerves.
64	12	"A Touch of the Fogs"	Neil Bennun	6 November 2018	212
Everyone in OKIDO wants to see the dolphin's dance at Vivienne Volcano's island.
65	13	"Geoffrey Kneads a Hand"	Neil Richards	7 November 2018	213
A spot of baking with Geoffrey goes awry when Messy gets the quantities wrong.
66	14	"A Mayor Too Far"	Neil Bennun	14 October 2019	214
Strawberries, mayors and Zam's latest invention help Messy find out more about himself.
67	15	"Blue Skies Ahead"	Neil Bennun	15 October 2019	215
The friends go on a trip in the rocket to find out why OKIDO's sky has turned so red.
68	16	"Sweet Sticky Messy"	Emma Boucher	16 October 2019	216
Messy and his friends must discover why the bees are upset about Mayor Oki's popular new perfume.
69	17	"Messy Moves a Mountain"	Gabby Dawnay	17 October 2019	217
Rocky Mountain wants to visit the beach, so Messy and his friends come up with a plan.
70	18	"Carroty Carrots"	Neil Bennun	18 October 2019	218
Things go wrong when Messy and his friends help make the biggest birthday cake ever.
71	19	"Bubble Trouble"	Dan Haythorn	21 October 2019	219
Things start to go a bit wrong when Zam invents a super-strong bubble machine.
72	20	"Supersonic Messy"	Rebecca Stevens	22 October 2019	220
Jealous of the new RoboCar and its super-fast speeds, Okidoodle tries to catch up with it.
73	21	"Muscly Messy"	Emma Boucher	23 October 2019	221
Messy and Zam race each other at the OKIDO Oki-lympics.
74	22	"Messy Mega Power"	Rebecca Stevens	24 October 2019	222
When OKIDO's electricity runs out, Messy has to find a way of powering an Oki-dokis concert.
75	23	"Messy's Pixel Power"	Dan Haythorn	25 October 2019	223
Messy wants to know about how the pictures and cartoons get onto screens and TVs.
76	24	"Sneezy Wheezy"	Gabby Dawnay	28 October 2019	224
Messy and his friends investigate the mysterious sound keeping everyone in OKIDO awake.
77	25	"The Gloria Express"	Rebecca Stevens	29 October 2019	225
OKIDO's trains are halted by leaves on the line and Messy and his friends have to find a way to solve the problem, so that the mayor would arrive at lunch on time.
78	26	"Zoom Has a Dream"	Neil Richards	30 October 2019	226
Zam invents a machine that makes it possible to enter other people's dreams.

=== Series 3 (2022–2023) ===
No. overall	No. in season	Title	Written by	Original release date
79	1	"Tummy Flutters"	Emma Boucher	21 November 2022
Messy wants to perform a triple flip at the OKIDO circus, but he has a problem with tummy flutters.
80	2	"Hiccups"	Emma Boucher	22 November 2022
Messy's hiccups cause a landslide while out on a nature walk.
81	3	"Pongberry"	Neil Bennun	23 November 2022
Messy has to deliver a giant pongberry to the Pongberry Pie Festival before it goes off.
82	4	"Weather Balloons"	Dan Haythorn	24 November 2022
Messy, Zoom and Zim fly through the skies to track down Zim's missing weather balloons.
83	5	"Musical Statues"	Mariama Ives-Moiba	25 November 2022
Messy gets pins and needles and causes chaos at the OKIDO musical statues competition.
84	6	"Monster Popcorn"	Dilpreet Kaur Walia	28 November 2022
A giant popcorn is on the loose in OKIDO, and Messy and Zoom must find a way to stop it.
85	7	"Down the Drain"	Emma Boucher	29 November 2022
Messy and his friends go on a white-water adventure down the drain.
86	8	"Memory Game"	Dan Haythorn	30 November 2022
Messy goes to OKIDO and learns how to jog his memory.
87	9	"Rise of the Vacubots"	Neil Bennun	1 December 2022
Messy goes to OKIDO to find out why vacuum cleaners are so noisy.
88	10	"Itchy"	Rebecca Stevens	2 December 2022
Vivienne Volcano has an itch, and it is up to Messy to help before she blows her top.
89	11	"The Great Okido Challenge"	Sara Daddy	5 December 2022
Messy wants to run further, but he keeps getting out of breath.
90	12	"Messy Needs a Fur Cut"	Adam Redfern	6 December 2022
Messy accidentally sets Farmer Fuddle's sheep loose.
91	13	"Full of Beans"	Neil Bennun	7 December 2022
Messy learns how food provides an energy.
92	14	"Chattering Teeth"	Mariama Ives-Moiba	2 January 2023
After causing a mini avalanche, Messy must help Lofty dig out the entrance to his cave.
93	15	"Messy's Missing Treasure"	Dilpreet Kaur Walia	3 January 2023
Mayor Oki wants to dress to impress the visiting mayor with a gemstone-encrusted chain.
94	16	"The Okido Fizz War"	Neil Bennun	4 January 2023
Mayor Oki and Geoffrey have a competition about the best fizzy water in OKIDO.
95	17	"Rusty Robot"	Mariama Ives-Moiba	5 January 2023
When Stan Tall starts to develop rust, it is up to Messy to help.
96	18	"Messy Cake Off"	Gabby Dawnay	6 January 2023
It is the Great OKIDO Cake Off, and Messy is sure he knows how to bake the best cake.
97	19	"Micro Okido"	Neil Bennun	9 January 2023
Zim and Zam have discovered the lost city of Micro OKIDO.
98	20	"Sleepless in Okido"	Liam Swann	10 January 2023
It is the Great OKIDO Sleepover, but there is a loud noise keeping Messy awake.
99	21	"Wobbly Tower"	Dan Haythorn	11 January 2023
Mayor Oki wants to build a new tower and hires Messy to be his master builder.
100	22	"Messy Gets Clean"	Emma Boucher	12 January 2023
Messy learns just how much soap is too much when he travels to the Okido launderette.
101	23	"Space Cucumber"	Neil Bennun	13 January 2023
Messy discovers an unusual kind of cucumber, but when he tries it, it results in creation of his clone.
102	24	"Messy Breaks the Brakes"	Adam Redfern	16 January 2023
Messy must stop a runaway mobile platform.
103	25	"Slippery Messy"	Dan Haythorn	17 January 2023
OKIDO is covered in ice, and Messy must find a way to melt it before it is too late.
104	26	"The Big Bang"	Emma Boucher	18 January 2023
Messy travels back to the start of the universe to find out where everything came from.
