= Nigel Buxton =

British travel writer and wine critic (1924–2015)

- Born: Nigel Edward Buxton; 29 May 1924; Cowfold, Sussex, England
- Died: 30 November 2015 (aged 91); Norfolk, England
- Education: University of Glasgow; Worcester College, Oxford
- Occupation: Writer
- Known for: The Adam and Joe Show
- Spouse: Valerie Buxton (m. 1966)
- Children: 3, including Adam Buxton
- Writing career
- Genres: Travel; wine criticism

Nigel Edward Buxton (29 May 1924 – 30 November 2015) was a British writer of travel literature and wine criticism, also known for appearing as BaaadDad in the Channel 4 comedy series The Adam and Joe Show.

== Early life ==
Buxton was born on 29 May 1924 in Cowfold, Sussex to Gordon Offord Buxton (1884–1951) and Mary Janetta Buxton (née Griffiths; born 1880). Buxton's father was a chauffeur and 'general factotum' at Brook Hill House, which was owned by Lieutenant-Colonel Edward William Hermon whom he'd served as a batman during First World War.

== Career ==
=== Travel writer ===
After education at Collyer's Grammar School, Horsham and the Imperial Service College, Windsor, followed by the University of Glasgow and Worcester College, University of Oxford. at the latter of which he read Modern History, graduating in 1954, Buxton became travel columnist – later travel editor – of The Sunday Telegraph in 1961.

=== BaaadDad ===
In the 1990s, Buxton appeared as "BaaadDad" on The Adam and Joe Show on Channel 4, which was written and presented by his son Adam Buxton along with Adam's friend Joe Cornish. The comedy behind the character of BaaadDad was the juxtaposition of the fact that he was clearly an elderly and upper middle class man with the topics that he discusses, which relate to youth culture – clubbing, drug use, and so on. As this character, he featured in the video for Frank Black's single "Dog Gone".

== Personal life and death ==
During the Second World War, having been commissioned in the Royal Artillery in 1943, Buxton served in France and Germany. Prior to his journalistic career, Buxton also served as assistant adjutant in India during the last days of the British Raj. In 1966, Buxton married Valerie Buxton, née Birrell, and had a daughter and two sons.

Buxton wrote several books, including A Penguin Guide to Travel in Europe, published by Penguin in 1965, Travel '67, published by Follett in 1967, ,Walking in Wine Country, published by Weidenfeld & Nicolson in 1993, ‘Proving Ground’ in 2009, ‘The Fading Margin - A sort of autobiography’ in 2010 and ‘The Road to Fleet Street - An autobiography’ in 2015 all self-published by New Barn Books.

Buxton died from complications arising from lung cancer at his son Adam Buxton's Norfolk home on 30 November 2015.
