= E4 (TV channel) =

British free-to-air television channel

- Logo used since 2018
- Country: United Kingdom
- Broadcast area: United Kingdom and Ireland

Programming
- Language: English
- Picture format: 1080i HDTV (downscaled to 16:9 576i for the SDTV feed)
- Timeshift service: E4 +1

Ownership
- Owner: Channel Four Television Corporation
- Sister channels: Channel 4; 4seven; E4 Extra; Film4; More4

History
- Launched: 18 January 2001; 25 years ago

Links
- Website: www.channel4.com/collection/e4

Availability

Terrestrial
- See separate section

E4 is a British free-to-air public broadcast television channel owned and operated by Channel Four Television Corporation. The "E" stands for entertainment and the channel is primarily aimed at the 16–34 age group (similarly to BBC Three and ITV2).

Programmes currently shown on the channel include Hollyoaks, Made in Chelsea, Coach Trip (and its Halloween spin-off Celebrity Ghost Trip), The most successful broadcast of the channel to date was on 11 October 2010 when an episode of The Inbetweeners received over 3.7 million viewers.

== History ==
E4 was announced in 1999, as a pay-TV channel, owing to the success of the new FilmFour channel that launched in the previous year. In December, Channel 4 announced a £100 million deal to acquire the first run pay TV rights to popular American series Friends and ER from Sky One; the deal was meant to strengthen the new channel. Rights to both shows were originally owned by Channel 4 upon their 1995 UK debuts, but became shared with Sky a year later. Channel 4 CEO Michael Jackson thought that the channel would be like "a BBC2 to Channel 4's BBC1" in line with its plans to be a multichannel operator. The channel would clash with Sky One in terms of demographics, but once the channel would get a green light from Channel 4, it would join the Sky Digital platform, considering that FilmFour already had a sizable amount of subscribers, 250,000 by year-end 1999, aiming for 400,000 by year-end 2000.

Andy Anson, though, thought that, by May 2000, scheduling the channel against Channel 4 was going to be "a challenge" and that the service would have to compete with like-minded channels such as Paramount Comedy. The website, though, would be introduced before the channel in order to raise brand awareness. On 1 June, EMAP Digital signed a deal with E4 to include its content as part of a multi-branded website. By late September, it announced that the channel would launch in mid-January next year, and announced its first original to the public, Banzai, a Japanese-styled game show with interactive elements. Negotiations with EMAP Digital regarding content were held on 19 October. Also pivotal for the new channel were reality shows: the first UK series of Big Brother, set to air on E4 first with reruns on Channel 4 later. and the dating format Five Go Dating.

The Guardian published on 6 November an indicative schedule of what to expect for the channel. 4-8pm would be used for T4-esque programming, mostly US imports, though this would also include the local teen soap As If. 8-9pm would be used to air the US version of Blind Date and Channel 4 repeats, either local (Smack the Pony) or imports (Party of Five). 9-10pm would be used for prime time first-run content, both American and British, the latter of which being new productions for the channel. A half-hour original documentary strand, Generation E, would air from 11pm, most of them were expected to be related to sex. From 11:30pm to closedown (4am), the channel would air repeats of past Channel 4 productions. The channel was budgeted at £40 million in its first year on air. Individual programmes had a budget of £40,000 per episode.

ITV Digital confirmed the launch of the channel on its basic subscription package on 19 December. The channel would air new episodes of Friends, ER and Ally McBeal before their showings on Channel 4. By early January 2001, the channel still hadn't reached an agreement with Sky, largely due to problems with the carriage fee.

E4's first logo used from 2001 to 2018

E4 launched as a pay television companion to Channel 4 on 18 January 2001, at 8:15pm, with Friends and ER leading the first night, alongside the premiere of Banzai. The first evening of programmes was fronted by Ali G.

On 16 December 2004, Channel 4 announced that the subscription channel would become a free-to-air television channel by launching on the digital terrestrial television system. The switch took place on 27 May 2005 to coincide with the launch of Big Brother 6 later that evening.

E4 launched an Ireland service in June 2002, which has become the second most popular non-terrestrial channel in Ireland with 1.1% of the audience; Sky One is the most popular. On 14 July 2003, E4 launched a timeshift service, E4 +1. E4 +1 is a 1-hour timeshift.

In August 2005, following the close of that year's Big Brother, E4 introduced the E4 Music programming block. The slot initially ran through much of the morning/daytime schedule, though was later reduced to mornings only, with the amount of scripted comedy and drama screened in daytime increased. Prior to the launch of E4 Music, E4 was off-air during daytime for much of the year, only going on air in daytime for rolling coverage of reality series such as Big Brother. In 2008, the launch of 4Music as a channel led to questions being asked about the future of E4 Music. However, E4 retained its commitment to music content, stating that E4 Music had been commissioned to run until at least the start of Big Brother in 2009. At 10 am on Thursday 4 June 2009, the day before the launch of the 2009 Big Brother series, E4 Music ceased broadcasting.

In July 2007, it was announced Channel 4 would be launching E4 Radio, the first of a network of channels to be broadcast on DAB radio. The station was planned for launch in July 2008 and aimed at a similar demographic to its television channel, however this launch date was later delayed. In October 2008, Channel 4 announced it was abandoning its plans for digital radio, and thus scrapping the E4 Radio proposal.

On 14 December 2009, a high-definition simulcast of E4 launched on Sky+ HD channel 215, it was later added to Virgin Media on 1 April 2010. On 31 October 2013, E4 premiered a refreshed look as part of the channel's rebranding. This coincided with the debut of the seventh season of The Big Bang Theory, as well as the debut of original comedy Drifters.

On 27 September 2018, E4 and its sister digital channels underwent a major rebranding, adopting a new logo derived from Channel 4's Lambie-Nairn-designed "4" logo. On 14 January 2019, Channel 4 announced a partnership with WarnerMedia to carry programmes from Adult Swim, such as Rick and Morty, on E4 and All4.

On 25 September 2021, transmission of channels operated by Channel 4 was impacted by the activation of a fire suppressant system at the premises of Red Bee Media. This resulted in music channel The Box being simulcast on Freeview in the place of 4Music (a channel known for repeating comedy and reality shows previously shown on E4) and E4+1 remaining off air for a number of days. E4+1 came back on air on 30 September 2021, in time for the series 6 finale of Married At First Sight to be broadcast. However the ongoing technical problems prevented this episode being shown, with a repeat of the previous episode being broadcast instead. The final episode was rescheduled for 1 October 2021 at 9pm on E4, taking over the Friday night film slot, with Married at First Sight: Afters scheduled for 10pm.

On 13 June 2022, it was announced that a new sister network – E4 Extra, would launch on 29 June in the slot accompanied by 4Music. E4 Extra is dedicated to comedy programming, with already existing comedy programmes such as The Big Bang Theory moving to the new channel, alongside the entertainment programming that airs on 4Music, which will move to the slot accompanied by Box Hits and transition back to a full-time music channel, before 4Music closed on 30 June 2024.

== Availability ==
=== Cable ===
- Virgin Media (UK): Channel 106 (HD) and Channel 306 (+1)

=== Online ===
- Channel 4 (UK): Watch live

Is currently available from the Channel 4 website.

- FilmOn (UK): Watch live

=== Satellite ===
- Freesat (UK): Channel 122 and Channel 123 (+1)
- Sky (UK): Channel 135 (HD/SD), Channel 235 (+1) and Channel 830 (SD)
- Sky (Ireland): Channel 136, Channel 236 (+1) and Channel 345 (HD)

=== Terrestrial ===
- Freeview (UK): Channel 13 and Channel 30 (+1)

== Programming ==
When E4 launched in 2001, its flagship programmes were the sitcom Friends and medical drama series ER. Other launch programmes included new teen drama As If and various other popular and acclaimed US dramas such as The Sopranos and The West Wing. The Adam and Joe Show moved from Channel 4 to E4, and the pair also presented a revival of their original show, Takeover TV. A few months after the channel's launch, E4 launched Big Brother's Little Brother - a spin-off from the reality show Big Brother (which ran on Channel 4 from 2000 to 2010, and is now broadcast on ITV) which proved successful for the channel. The channel also dedicated whole nights early in its history to marathons of certain programmes, such as Spaced and Brass Eye.

As of 2023, most comedy and drama had been moved (or, in the case of Brooklyn Nine-Nine, had come to an end) with weekday evening slots being given over increasingly to reality and unscripted programming – a mixture of original series (such as Teen Mum Academy and the 2022 revival of Embarrassing Bodies), first-run imports such as the Below Deck franchise, and repeated Channel 4 series, with Naked Attraction and Gogglebox in particular being especially prominent in primetime. Sitcom reruns (and some first-run imports, such as The Neighborhood) by now chiefly aired on E4 in daytime and on E4 Extra in the evening.

On 6 January 2025, American animated comedy series The Simpsons began airing on E4, after being broadcast on Channel 4 for 20 years since its debut in November 2004.

The channel has also moved many of its acquired US shows such as Harley Quinn, Batwoman, The Goldbergs and Duncanville out of peak and put them in a daytime or a late night slot to continue their seasons. In their place, the channel has decided to strip a number of reality and dating series, with the channel's flagship programme being Married At First Sight UK, which has brought in audiences of around 2 million people each night to the channel, having moved from the flagship Channel 4. Married At First Sight UK is part of a franchise which also includes the imported Married at First Sight Australia and spin-off Married at First Sight UK: Afters with AJ Odudu.

Even though E4 has decided to move a lot of its acquired US programmes to overnight slots, there are some notable exceptions, with Rick and Morty heavily promoted and shown in primetime, whilst repeats of The Big Bang Theory and new episodes of spin-off Young Sheldon are also shown in peak slots, while repeats of shows such as Brooklyn Nine-Nine and Modern Family fill up the daytime schedule.

In November 2021, Channel Four Television Corp. revived GamesMaster after 23 years, with Sir Trevor McDonald taking on the title role from the original "Games Master", Sir Patrick Moore. It also revealed that another one of its former primetime imports, The 100, will end its run by having the final season put out by E4 each night around 3:25am from Saturday 27 November 2021. This came about after the initial plan to play the final season on 4Music – as had been promoted in on-air trails in the weeks prior – was scrapped when the Red Bee incident disrupted transmission of programming on 4Music for over a month.

After hosting repeats of the weekly Channel 4 satire panel show 8 Out of 10 Cats with Jimmy Carr, Sean Lock and Jon Richardson for many years, the production was adapted to become a title which debuted new episodes on E4 in 2017 (as the parent channel focused on its spin-off ...Cats Does Countdown). The version on E4 dispensed with the topical news questioning of later Channel 4 series and went back to being a show about random statistics and opinion polls, with Jimmy Carr continuing as host, alongside Rob Beckett and Aisling Bea as the team captains (replacing Lock and Richardson, who continued with the spin-off). As of 2022, titles such as The Inbetweeners still get repeated in a regular peak-time slot, alongside repeats of Channel 4's Taskmaster.

=== Most watched programmes ===
The following is a list of the ten most watched shows on E4, based on Live +7 data supplied by BARB up to 11 November 2018. The number of viewers does not include repeats or airings on E4+1.

Rank	Series	Episode	Viewers	Date
1	The Inbetweeners	3.05 – "Home Alone"	3,721,000	11 October 2010
2	The Inbetweeners	3.06 – "The Camping Trip"	3,704,000	18 October 2010
3	The Inbetweeners	3.04 – "The Trip to Warwick"	3,619,000	4 October 2010
4	The Inbetweeners	3.03 – "Will's Dilemma"	3,572,000	27 September 2010
5	The Inbetweeners	3.01 – "The Fashion Show"	3,456,000	13 September 2010
6	The Inbetweeners	3.02 – "The Gig and the Girlfriend"	3,336,000	20 September 2010
7	The Big Bang Theory	6.01 – "The Date Night Variable"	2,803,000	15 November 2012
8	Married at First Sight UK	6.13	2,750,000	20 September 2021
9	The Big Bang Theory	9.05 – "The Perspiration Implementation"	2,728,000	26 November 2015
10	The Big Bang Theory	9.12 – "The Sales Call Sublimination"	2,688,000	24 March 2016

== Big Brother coverage ==
Between 2001 and 2010 when the reality series Big Brother (and Celebrity Big Brother) were being transmitted on Channel 4, E4 devoted much of its schedule to live coverage from inside the Big Brother house; interactive features that gave access to additional camera angles have also been transmitted. The channel also had Big Brother voting options, Big Brother spin-off shows such as Big Brother Live, Big Brother's Little Brother, Big Brother's Big Mouth, Diary Room Uncut and Big Brother highlights repeats. In June 2020, to mark the 20th anniversary of Big Brother's inception, E4 aired select episodes from both the civilian and celebrity programmes, in a series titled Big Brother: Best Shows Ever. Hosted by Davina McCall and Rylan Clark-Neal, the first episode of the series received one million viewers.

In 2022, as part of its season of Australian reality shows, E4 showed the 2021 series of Big Brother VIP on the channel under the name Celebrity Big Brother Australia. Launching on Sunday 6 February 2022 at 8pm and then scheduled every weekday at 7:30pm, the programme lasted for four episodes on the channel, before it was taken off mid-series and replaced by a number of 'best of' compilations taken from Junior Bake Off.

== E4 Extra ==
In June 2022, Channel 4 announced that their music and entertainment channel 4Music's current channel slots would be replaced by a spinoff channel called E4 Extra on 29 June 2022, with 4Music taking Box Hits' slots on Freesat and Sky. With the change, E4 Extra will take entertainment shows like The Big Bang Theory, The Inbetweeners and Derry Girls and will add unscripted reality shows like Legendary, Ramsay's Kitchen Nightmares, Ninja Warrior Japan and Undercover Boss USA, while 4Music will go back to being a music channel.
