= The Adam and Joe Show =

British television comedy series

- Genre: Sketch comedy
- Starring: Adam Buxton; Joe Cornish
- Country of origin: United Kingdom
- Original language: English
- No. of series: 4
- No. of episodes: 22

Production
- Running time: 30 minutes (inc. adverts)
- Production company: World of Wonder

Original release
- Network: Channel 4 (1996–99); E4 (2001)
- Release: 6 December 1996 – 17 April 2001

The Adam and Joe Show is a British television sketch comedy show starring Adam Buxton and Joe Cornish that originally ran from 6 December 1996 to 28 May 1999 on Channel 4 for the first three series and then moved to E4 from 13 March to 17 April 2001 for the fourth and final series.

== Origin and format ==
Adam and Joe first appeared on Channel 4 show Takeover TV in 1995, with Adam presenting alone at first and Joe joining him as the series progressed. Following this they created The Adam and Joe Show for the same channel. Unusually for a comedy programme, the show was commissioned by Channel 4's head of religious programming, Peter Grimsdale: according to Cornish, "The remit for religion at 4 was to do with personal belief and personal expression, and somehow we came under that banner: it was almost like pop culture was our religion".

The show took the form of short, condensed sketches interspersed with links filmed in what was purportedly Adam and Joe's bedsit, but was actually a shared "performance space" above a branch of The Body Shop in Brixton, South London. When in this room, Adam wore a plain black T-shirt with 'Ad' and Joe wore one with 'Joe' written on the front. Although the two comedians were involved in other projects before and after it was aired, The Adam and Joe Show remains their most popular and well-known creation, and it gained a cult following.

== Memorable sketches ==
=== Toymovies ===
Each week, Adam and Joe would re-create a popular current feature film using stuffed toys and elaborate cardboard sets. These "Toymovies" condensed the story, look and action of each film into a couple of minutes. The most memorable included spoofs of Titanic (Toytanic), Showgirls (Showtoys), The English Patient (The Toy Patient), Saving Private Ryan (Saving Private Lion), American Beauty (American Beautoy), Shine (Shiney), Shakespeare in Love (Shakesbeare in Love), Fight Club (Tufty Club) and Trainspotting (Toytrainspotting), as well as television shows including Friends (Furends), Ally McBeal (Ally McSqueal) and Star Trek: The Next Generation (Stuffed Trek: The Toy Generation). According to Cornish, the amount of work involved in creating these sketches led Adam and Joe to work on them individually to avoid arguments, resulting in a rivalry with each attempting to upstage the other with ever-more elaborate sketches, as Joe explained: "I remember doing The English Patient and going to massive lengths to make a plane and a desert with sand dunes shaped like teddy bears. Adam was jealous and went: 'Right, I'm going to do something even better'. It ended up with me making a Titanic the length of a room to try and completely crush him".

=== BaaadDad ===
In the first series of the show, Adam's father Nigel Buxton (aka BaaadDad) reviewed music videos by contemporary groups that he knew nothing about. In later shows, he ventured out of his fireside armchair and into the field, going on a Club 18-30 holiday in Ibiza, going undercover at a public school ball, and smoking cannabis for the first time at the Tribal Gathering music festival. In a 2019 interview, Adam stated that the idea of getting his father to review contemporary music originally came from Louis Theroux.

=== Vinyl Justice ===
Dressed as policemen, Adam and Joe would raid rock stars' homes, then examine their record collections for embarrassing or surprising items. The star would then be forced to dance to the shameful discoveries. Victims included Frank Black, Gary Numan, Alexis Arquette, Tim Gane and Lætitia Sadier, Symposium, Dave Navarro, Cerys Matthews, Nick Heyward, Thomas Dolby, Ray Manzarek of The Doors and Mark E. Smith of The Fall. In 2009, Adam revealed on their BBC 6 Music show that some of the stars' 'homes' were not actually their own.

=== Songs ===
The Adam and Joe Show regularly included songs on random pop cultural themes, co-written with their school friend Zac Sandler. The most memorable included "The Footie Song" from 1998 the same year when France hosted the world cup, an ode to football sung and written by people who clearly neither cared or knew anything about it, "The Robert De Niro Calypso", a tribute to the famous actor from 1999, "My Name is Roscoe", a country and western song whose lyrics included the theory of relativity and "Song for Bob Hoskins".

=== Star Wars TV ===
In this segment, Adam and Joe used Star Wars action figures from the early 1980s to parody current British television shows. Targets included Gladiators, The Crystal Maze, You've Been Framed (Chew've Been Framed), Blind Date (Blind Data), TFI Friday, Big Brother (Big Jabba), Stars in Their Eyes (Star Wars in Their Eyes), This Morning, The Jerry Springer Show (Jedi Springer), Who Wants to Be a Millionaire? (Who Wants to Be Killed on Air?) and The Royle Family (The Imperial Family). Throughout these sketches, Obi-Wan Kenobi was memorably portrayed as a drunk vagrant.

=== Ken Korda ===
Ken Korda, a character played by Adam Buxton, was an obnoxious but self-assured media entrepreneur who undertook absurd popular cultural projects in the real world. These schemes included the production of a short film about criminal junkies called Speeding on the Needlebliss, and the formation of a teen band called 1471. By the fourth series, the segment Omniken had become a parody of Omnibus, with Korda fronting overly serious profiles of minor television celebrities including Pat Sharp, Handy Andy and Jenny Powell. On 13 June 2010, Ken hosted the film-themed edition of "Adam Buxton's Big Mixtape" (titled "A Proper Mix Now!", a play on "Apocalypse Now") when Adam was unable to host the show due to having locked himself in his shed.

=== The 1980s House ===
This segment of the show was a parody of The 1900 House and The 1940s House, in which the Fatboy Slim family from the early 21st century travels back to the 1980s. The only 21st century object allowed in the house was a webcam, using which the Fatboy Slim family recorded video diaries, recounting their experiences of 1980s living, such as riding the Sinclair C5, thoughts on the guy from the Ready Brek adverts, and watching the video nasty called Cannibal Holocaust on a new Betamax machine.

=== Media Chaos Collective ===
In series 4, Adam and Joe began a segment seeing them play West Country anti-authority media terrorists, who would 'interrupt' the regular programming and show their own clips harassing and playing pranks on targets they deemed suitable to cause chaos. Targets included an MP, the Millennium Dome, and banks, however the characters themselves were so inept that most of the time they end up looking foolish, an example being unfolding a misspelled banner on the stage of the Millennium Dome saying "The Dome is Carp". The characters came from an original prank the boys played on a hardware shop, acting suspicious when buying tools and materials to dispose of a corpse.

In some episodes, they parody other Channel 4 TV shows which were popular at the time of series 4's broadcast, such as Jam and Trigger Happy TV.

In 2003 their parody of Jam was put on the Jam DVD as an extra.

=== Pranks ===
Adam and Joe would regularly film each other performing camcorder pranks in the real world. In the first series, they ventured into a supermarket in Brixton and began helping themselves to the 'free' percentage from packages marked as including, for example, "20% free". In the second series, they ruined an unsuspecting man's front room while posing as designers from a home makeover show, then broke into a brewery to see how easy it would be to organise a piss-up. In the third series, they built a poor-quality, movie-themed animatronic wax museum from mannequins and charged tourists for entry, as well as competing as street mimes in Covent Garden Market.

=== External links ===
Adam and Joe's links were performed sitting on their bed, in front of a crowded backdrop of contemporary popular cultural clutter. Memorable links included a guide to ways to fiddle with a candle while in a restaurant with a boring person; the most entertaining household objects to put in your microwave oven; and an experiment to see whether consuming Coca-Cola and Space Dust sherbet really does make your stomach explode. They concluded that no, it does not, but it is 'very bad'.

== Transmissions ==
Series	Start date	End date	Episodes
1	6 December 1996	31 December 1996	4
2	22 November 1997	13 December 1997	6
2	6 March 1998	13 March 1998	6
3	16 April 1999	28 May 1999	6
4	13 March 2001	17 April 2001	6
