= Joe Cornish =

English comedian and filmmaker

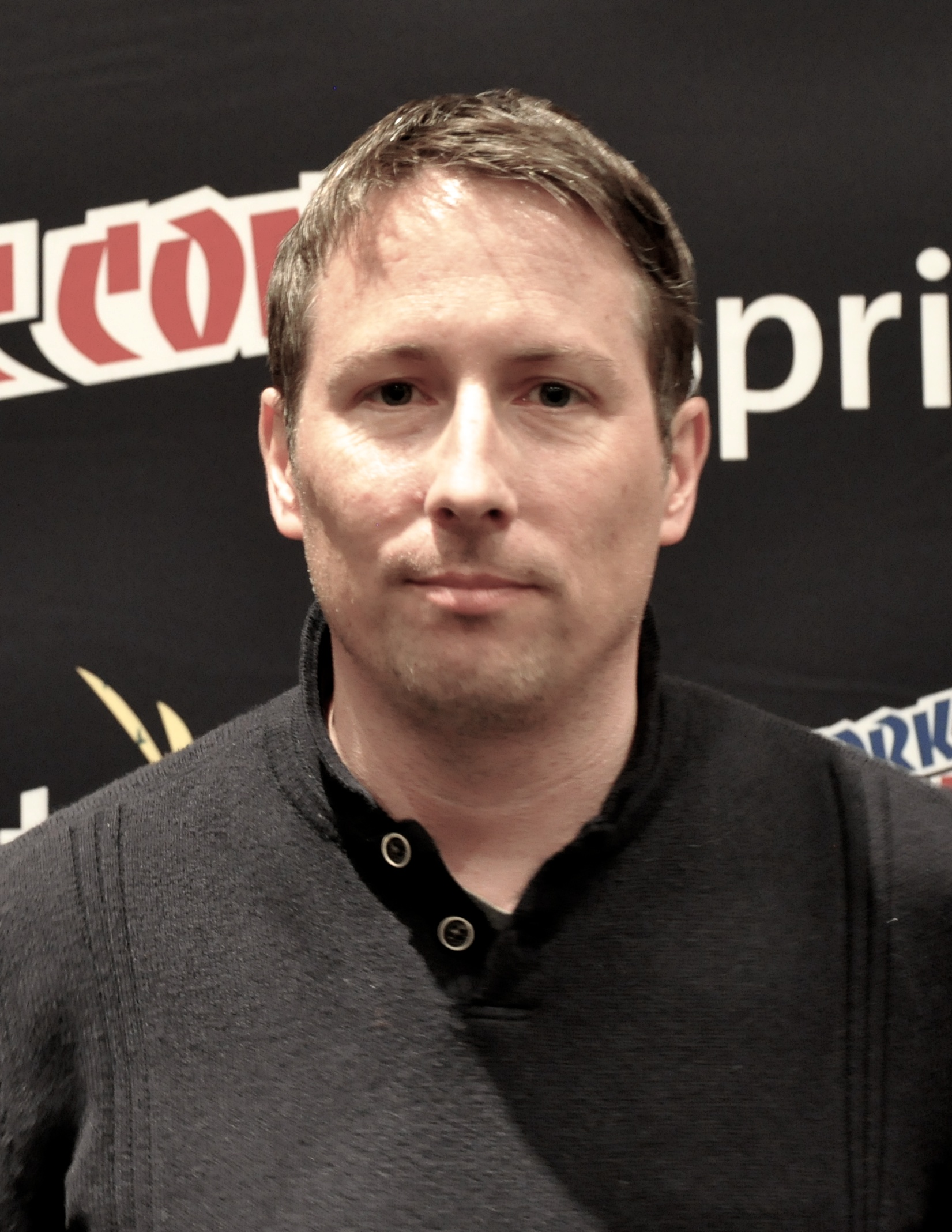
- Cornish at the 2011 New York Comic Con
- Born: Joseph Murray Cornish; 20 December 1968 (age 57); London, England
- Education: Westminster School; Bournemouth Film School
- Occupations: Comedian; screenwriter; director; producer
- Years active: 1995–present
- Children: 1

Joseph Murray Cornish (born 20 December 1968) is an English comedian, and a film and television show maker. With Adam Buxton, he forms the comedy duo Adam and Joe. In 2011, Cornish released his directorial debut Attack the Block. He also co-wrote The Adventures of Tintin with Steven Moffat and Edgar Wright, and Ant-Man, with Wright, Adam McKay, and Paul Rudd.

== Early life and education ==
Cornish grew up in Stockwell. His father, Michael Cornish, had written short stories and TV and radio plays as a young man. Cornish was privately educated at Westminster School in London, where he became friends with both Adam Buxton and Louis Theroux. After finishing school he went on to study at the Bournemouth Film School.

== Career ==
Cornish started his career in television before moving into film.

=== The Adam and Joe Show ===
The Adam and Joe Show was an ironic pop culture sketch show written, presented and directed by the duo. The show found cult success during its four series between 1996 and 2001. The best-known segments featured hit feature films recreated with stuffed toys, British television shows parodied using Star Wars action figures, and Vinyl Justice, in which the pair invaded rock stars' homes and searched their record collections for embarrassing records.

Since the end of show, Cornish has continued to work in British television and radio as a presenter, writer and director, both with and without Buxton. He wrote and presented the BBC Radio 4 film programme Back Row between 2002 and 2003.

In 2001, he fronted the topical discussion show This Week Only, alongside Nick Frost and Lauren Laverne.

In 2007, he and Buxton began presenting Adam and Joe, a radio show on BBC Radio 6 Music. This was put on hold during 2010 while Cornish directed Attack the Block; a new series began on Saturday 2 April 2011.

=== Film and TV ===
Cornish has made a number of behind-the-scenes documentaries/video diaries. They include Cornish following the making of Little Britain series 2, which was screened on BBC Three and is included on the Little Britain Series 2 DVD; a video diary of his brief cameo as a zombie, which appears on the UK Shaun of the Dead DVD; and Hot Fuzz: The Fuzzball Rally, where he followed his friends and collaborators, Edgar Wright, Nick Frost and Simon Pegg on the US press tour for their film Hot Fuzz. There have been two cuts of the Fuzzball Rally: a 28-minute version was included on the Hot Fuzz HD DVD (UK/US) and a 71-minute version was included on both the 3-Disc Collectors Edition DVD (US) and the Blu-ray Disc (US/UK) of Fuzz. The documentary caused the latter's certification to be changed from a 15 certificate to an 18 certificate, due to the very strong language the documentary contains.

He made a brief appearance in Hot Fuzz as a white suited and bemasked Scenes-of-Crime Officer named "Bob". In 2017, he made a cameo in Star Wars: The Last Jedi alongside Wright, where both played Resistance fighters.

In 2006, he was announced as co-writer on a feature film adaptation of the Marvel Comics comic book character Ant-Man, with Shaun of the Dead director Edgar Wright. Both Wright and Cornish received story by and screenplay credit on the finished film, after Wright's departure from the project in 2014. Wright and Cornish also rewrote Steven Moffat's script for The Adventures of Tintin co-starring Simon Pegg, for Steven Spielberg and Peter Jackson. In November 2013, Cornish was tipped to be J. J. Abrams' lead choice for director of the upcoming Star Trek Beyond. However, Roberto Orci was ultimately chosen to direct, before leaving the project in late 2014.

Cornish has continued his work in television comedy, directing parts of the pilot of Modern Toss, and the pilot to Channel 4's Blunder. According to an interview in Word Magazine, he pulled out of directing the series of Blunder due to creative differences with Channel 4 and the production company. In early 2007, he directed the video for Charlotte Hatherley's single "I Want You to Know".

Attack the Block

On 13 May 2011, Optimum Releasing released Attack the Block, Cornish's directorial debut, which had his friend and collaborator Edgar Wright working as executive producer, and was produced by Film4, Big Talk Pictures, the UK Film Council and Optimum's French parent company StudioCanal (which would later rebrand Optimum under their name four months after the film's British release). The film is a science fiction action horror comedy set in South London that pitches a gang of youths against an alien invasion. The film initially had no US distributor, but after the reaction of the press and attendees at the SXSW premiere, the US rights were purchased by Screen Gems for theatrical release on 29 July 2011.

The Kid Who Would Be King

Cornish's second film was the fantasy adventure The Kid Who Would Be King, starring Louis Ashbourne Serkis. Filming took place in Tintagel. The film, also featuring Patrick Stewart and Rebecca Ferguson, was released on 25 January 2019.

=== Future projects ===
In May 2020, it was announced that Cornish would direct and write the TV series adaptation of Lockwood & Co. for Netflix. In April 2021, it was announced that Cornish would direct and write an adaptation of Starlight for 20th Century Studios. In May 2021, it was announced that Cornish would write, direct, and produce a sequel to Attack the Block. In October 2024, it was announced that Cornish would direct one of three live-action Lego movies for Universal Pictures. He will also be rewriting from previous drafts by Heather Anne Campbell and Simon Rich.

=== Abandoned projects ===
In June 2012, it was announced that Cornish had been signed as director of a future film adaptation of Neal Stephenson's classic 1992 novel Snow Crash for Paramount Pictures. Cornish later said that part of why the film wasn't made was due to working with Wright on Ant-Man. In 2017, Amazon Studios acquired the rights to the novel with the intent for a streaming series. In 2019, HBO Max acquired the rights, with Michael Bacall joining as writer.

In July 2012, Cornish signed on to direct a film adaptation of the graphic novel Rust for 20th Century Fox. In September 2013, Carlos Saldanha was brought in to replace him.

In March 2014, Cornish was hired by Universal Pictures to direct Section 6, based on the founding of MI6. However, the studio then faced a lawsuit from Metro-Goldwyn-Mayer and Danjaq for perceived similarities to James Bond.

=== Filmography ===
Film

Year	Title	Director	Writer	Executive Producer
2011	The Adventures of Tintin	No	Yes	No
2011	Attack the Block	Yes	Yes	Yes
2015	Ant-Man	No	Yes	No
2019	The Kid Who Would Be King	Yes	Yes	No

Cameo roles

Year	Title	Role	Notes
1999	Notting Hill	Fan Receiving Anna's Autograph	Uncredited
2004	Shaun of the Dead	Zombie Shot by Soldiers	Uncredited
2007	Hot Fuzz	Bob	
2017	Star Wars: The Last Jedi	Resistance Trooper	Uncredited

Television

Year	Title	Director	Writer	Executive Producer
2003	Adam and Joe Go Tokyo	Yes	Yes	Yes
2023	Lockwood & Co.	Yes	Yes	Yes
