= Attack the Block =

2011 British film directed by Joe Cornish

- UK theatrical release poster
- Directed by: Joe Cornish
- Written by: Joe Cornish
- Produced by: Nira Park; James Wilson
- Starring: John Boyega; Jodie Whittaker; Alex Esmail; Franz Drameh; Leeon Jones; Simon Howard; Luke Treadaway; Jumayn Hunter; Nick Frost
- Cinematography: Tom Townend
- Edited by: Jonathan Amos
- Music by: Basement Jaxx; Steven Price
- Production companies: StudioCanal; Film4; UK Film Council; Big Talk Pictures
- Distributed by: Optimum Releasing
- Release dates: 12 March 2011 (SXSW); 11 May 2011 (United Kingdom)
- Running time: 88 minutes
- Country: United Kingdom
- Language: English
- Budget: £8 million ($13 million)
- Box office: $6.2–6.5 million

Attack the Block is a 2011 British science fiction comedy horror film written and directed by Joe Cornish in his feature directional debut and starring John Boyega, Jodie Whittaker, and Nick Frost. Its storyline centres on a teenage social club who have to defend themselves from predatory alien invaders on a council estate in South London on Guy Fawkes Night. It was the film debut of Cornish, Boyega, and composer Steven Price.

Released on 11 May 2011, Attack the Block underperformed at the box office but received positive reception from the critics, with particular praise for Cornish's direction and Boyega's performance. It also received several international accolades. The film has been called a cult classic to sci fi fans.

== Plot ==
On Guy Fawkes Night, trainee nurse Samantha Adams is mugged by a gang of teenage hoodlums from South London: Pest, Dennis, Jerome, Biggz, and leader Moses. When a meteorite falls from the sky into a nearby car, Samantha escapes. As Moses searches the wreck of the car for valuables, his face is scratched by a dog-sized alien creature. The creature runs away, but the gang chase and kill it. Hoping to gain fame and fortune, they take the dead animal to their acquaintance, cannabis dealer Ron and his boss Hi-Hatz, a local gang leader, who instead recruits Moses to work for him.

More objects fall from the sky. The gang arm themselves and go after them; however, these aliens are much larger and more threatening. After one kills Dennis's pitbull Pogo, the gang flee but are intercepted by two police officers accompanying Samantha, and Moses is arrested. The aliens kill the officers, and Samantha and Moses escape. A henchman of local drug lord Hi-Hatz is killed by aliens. The gang flee, and Biggz hides in a recycling bin, though he is saved by a pair of their young neighbours who kill the alien. An alien bursts into Samantha's flat, and Moses kills it with a samurai sword, so she joins them.

The gang move upstairs to the flat where Tia, Dimples, Dionna, and Gloria live, but two aliens attack from outside, smashing through the windows and decapitating Dennis. Samantha kills an alien, saving Moses, while Tia and Dimples kill the other one. The girls believe the boys to be the focus of the creatures and kick them out of the flat. Hi-Hatz and two more henchmen arrive to attack the gang but are attacked by aliens; only Hi-Hatz makes it out alive.

The gang run into more aliens but use fireworks as a distraction. Jerome becomes disorientated in the smoke and is killed by an alien. Entering Ron's flat, they find Hi-Hatz, who prepares to shoot Moses but is attacked and killed by the rest of the aliens, who break in through the window. The group flee and are joined by Brewis, one of Ron's customers and a zoology student. Moses, Pest, and Samantha retreat into the weed room, while Ron hides in the flat.

In the weed room, Brewis notices a luminescent stain on Moses's jacket under the ultraviolet light. Brewis theorises that the aliens are like spores, drifting through space on solar winds until they chance on a habitable planet; after landing in an area with enough food, the female lets off a strong pheromone to attract the male creatures so that they can mate and propagate their species; Moses has been carrying scent since he killed the female, which is how the males have always found them. Moses persuades Pest to return Samantha's stolen ring, and they form a plan. As Samantha has not been stained with the alien pheromone, she can go to Moses's flat and turn on the gas oven.

Samantha bypasses the aliens and turns on the gas in the flat. She leaves the tower block, and Moses, with the corpse of the small female alien strapped to his back, runs to the gas-filled flat with all of the big male aliens following him. He throws the corpse into the flat; with a firework, he ignites the room and leaps out of the window. The resulting explosion kills all the aliens but leaves the high-rise flat in flames. Moses survives by grabbing onto a flag hanging from the balcony.

A crowd of residents from the block congregate outside after the explosion. Moses, Pest, Brewis, and Ron are arrested as the police believe they are responsible for all the deaths. The police question Samantha and ask her to say Moses and the gang are responsible for the mayhem, but she tells them they are her neighbors and protected her, showing her respect for Moses.

Biggz shows up within the crowd, telling the cops Moses saved the block. He then gets everyone to triumphantly chant Moses' name. As Moses and Pest sit in the back of a police van, Pest tells Moses that the chanting is for him, and they smile.

== Cast ==
Representative of the film's plot and location, most of the cast (many of whom spoke Multicultural London English during the film) were young, relative unknowns and local to the area. According to the DVD's making-of featurette, the teenagers were selected from drama classes of London council estate schools and then had to go through eight auditions before being offered a part. John Boyega found out about this film from an advert placed on the internet. The cast includes:

- John Boyega as Moses, a low-level crook, teenage gang leader and orphan looking for respect around the block
- Jodie Whittaker as Samantha Adams, a trainee nurse and new resident of Wyndham Tower
- Alex Esmail as Pest, a teenage jokester, pyrophile and loyal second-in-command of Moses's gang
- Franz Drameh as Dennis, a hotheaded pizza delivery boy and the enforcer of the gang
- Leeon Jones as Jerome, the most level-headed member of the gang and the most academically inclined
- Simon Howard as Biggz, the youngest member of the gang
- Nick Frost as Ron, the local drug dealer who lives in the penthouse of Wyndham Tower and knows everyone
- Luke Treadaway as Brewis, a posh student stoner who is one of Ron's customers
- Jumayn Hunter as Hi-Hatz, the local psychopathic gangster who is Ron's feared boss
- Danielle Vitalis as Tia, a girl living in Wyndham Tower who is Moses's love interest and friend to the gang
- Paige Meade as Dimples, Tia's quick tempered roommate who is also a friend to the gang.
- Sammy Williams as Probs, a child who wishes to join Moses's gang
- Michael Ajao as Mayhem, Probs's best friend, who shares his goal of joining Moses's gang
- Jacey Sallés as Biggz's mum
- Karl Collins as Dennis' dad
- Joey Ansah as Policeman
- Chris Wilson as arresting police officer

== Production ==
Big Talk Pictures, known for films including Shaun of the Dead, Hot Fuzz and Scott Pilgrim vs. The World, produced the film alongside Film4, The UK Film Council and StudioCanal.

The plot was inspired by an event where the director was mugged himself, and after adding the science fiction angle into the plot, Joe Cornish interviewed various kids in youth groups in order to find out what kind of weapons they would use if a real alien invasion occurred. The director wanted to counter the trend of 'hoodie horror' films which demonised urban youths. Cornish also based the character of the stoner Brewis on himself in his twenties.

=== Filming ===
Attack the Block is set in a fictional neighbourhood said in-film to be located in the Stockwell district of London. It is actually a composite of various council estates across London. Director Cornish explains:

We wanted to stamp a clear layout on the audience's minds early on, and since we couldn't show an aerial shot of the estate as it doesn't exist, the way to show it was by showing this top shot of the map at the very beginning of the film.

The name Wyndham Tower appears on the left of the entrance to the fictional tower block, referencing the English science-fiction writer John Wyndham, author of the 1953 novel, 'The Kraken Wakes' , which similarly begins with aliens invading Earth from outer space, as well as other science-fiction monster works such as 'The Day of the Triffids'. Other buildings in the estate are named for J. G. Ballard, author of a number of novels set in large urban tower blocks, including High-Rise where mayhem breaks out in a high-rise London apartment block, and famous science fiction authors H. G. Wells, Aldous Huxley and Douglas Adams.

The film was shot across London from March to May 2010, with six weeks of night shoots on the Heygate Estate in Elephant and Castle; Myatts Field, Brixton; Oval Underground station and the Bemerton Estate in Islington. Interior scenes were filmed at Three Mills Studios in Newham, part of the East End of London.

=== Creature effects ===
The creatures began with two men in gorilla-like suits with animatronic jaws; post-production added the unearthly qualities such as the spiky fur which doesn't reflect any light, the claws, the rows of bioluminescent jaws, and even some of their movement. In total the film features over 100 effects shots, which were completed over the course of four months by Swedish effects house Fido. The creatures have no eyes, navigating their environments by echolocation and using a highly developed sense of smell to hunt and find mates. According to the DVD commentary, the echolocation noises made by the creatures were a combination of dolphin sonar mixed digitally with the grunts and snarls of dozens of other animals, and even a woman screaming. Some puppets were used, such as the smaller, hairless female alien which terrified the young cast. In 2023, Cornish stated the creature designs were partly based on his pet cat who "engulfs darkness".

== Release ==
=== Theatrical ===
StudioCanal's British distribution company Optimum Releasing released the film in the United Kingdom on 11 May 2011. Sony Pictures Worldwide Acquisitions acquired the distribution rights for North America and Latin America. It received a limited release in the United States on 29 July 2011 through Screen Gems. US distributors were concerned that American audiences might not understand the strong South London accents, and may have even used subtitles if it were to be released in the United States. Cornish acknowledged this during the SXSW Q&A. When he asked the audience, "Can I ask you guys something? American distributors are nervous about language, the slang" the audience said they could understand it.

=== Home media ===
The film was released on DVD and Blu-ray Disc in the United Kingdom on 19 September 2011 and in the United States on 25 October 2011. Play.com released an exclusive Blu-ray and DVD double play edition, with a glow-in-the-dark sleeve, featuring the bio-luminescent jaws of one of the creatures.

=== Soundtrack ===
The soundtrack was an original score composed by British electronic music group Basement Jaxx, and Steven Price, save for a few featured songs not on the soundtrack (such as the 1993 rap track "Sound of da Police" by KRS-One, and the 2006 reggae track "Youths Dem Cold" by Richie Spice, played during the end credits). A rap song called "Get That Snitch", original to the film and rapped by the character Hi-Hatz, is featured at various times.

== Reception ==
=== Box office ===
On its opening theatrical weekend in the United Kingdom in May 2011, Attack the Block took £1,133,859, putting it in third place only slightly behind American blockbusters Thor and Fast Five. On a screen-by-screen basis, Attack the Block was the week's strongest performer. In North America, the film's theatrical run began in July 2011. In limited release for less than two months with 66 cinemas at its peak, it managed to gross US$1,024,175 in North America. It was a box office flop, despite receiving overall good reviews.

=== Critical response ===
On the review aggregator website Rotten Tomatoes, 90% of 183 critics' reviews are positive. The website's consensus reads: "Effortlessly mixing scares, laughs, and social commentary, Attack the Block is a thrilling, briskly-paced sci-fi yarn with a distinctly British flavor." Metacritic, which uses a weighted average, assigned the film a score of 75 out of 100, based on 27 critics, indicating "generally favorable" reviews.

The website Slash film lists Attack the Block as a "true cult classic" deserving of its own action figures. In his review, Chicago Sun-Times critic Roger Ebert praised the film's use of character development and the performance given by Boyega. Scott Wampler of The Examiner rated it A+ and said it was officially the best film of the 2011 film festival season and likened it to other debuts such as Neill Blomkamp's District 9 and Quentin Tarantino's Reservoir Dogs. Matt Patches writing for Cinemablend said "Attack the Block, even on its small scale, may wind up as one of the best action movies of the year". Christ Tilly at IGN gave it four stars saying "Cornish directs with the confidence of a seasoned pro" and calling the film "a blast from start-to-finish." Ben Rawson-Jones of Digital Spy awarded the movie four stars, saying that it is "exactly the kind of distinctly homegrown product that the British film industry should be making". Mark Kermode gave a mixed review saying he did not dislike the film, but "wanted it to be funnier" and "needed it to be scarier".

Attack the Block was revisited by critics following the casting of its two lead actors as stars of flagship science fiction franchises – Boyega as Finn in Star Wars and Whittaker as the Thirteenth Doctor in Doctor Who. In a 2017 retrospective, Tom Philip writing for GQ described the film as "one of the most confidently-delivered debut feature films in recent memory" and said it "still stands out as one of the best genre-mashup films of the decade", while Nathan Rabin for Rotten Tomatoes said that the film deserved cult status and called it "a star-making vehicle in the truest sense". It was listed among Wired Magazine's best films of the 2010s.

=== Accolades ===
- Audience Award for Best Film (Midnights) at SXSW 2011
- Audience Award for Best Narrative Feature at the Los Angeles Film Festival
- Audience Award for Best European or American Feature at the 2011 Fantasia Festival
- Melies d'Argent for Best European Fantastic Feature Film 2011 at the Lund International Fantastic Film Festival
- Muut Award for Best Visual Concept at the 2011 Miskolc International Film Festival
- Bassan Arts and Crafts Award for Best Production Design at the Torino Film Festival 2011
- Golden Mouse Online Critics Award for Best Film at the Torino Film Festival 2011
- Best Debut Director at the 2011 New York Film Critics Online Awards
- Best First Feature at the 2011 Toronto Film Critics Association Awards
- Best Original Soundtrack at the 2011 Sitges Film Festival
- Special Jury Award at the 2011 Sitges Film Festival
- Audience Award for Best Motion Picture at the 2011 Sitges Film Festival
- Jose Luis Guarner Critic Award at the 2011 Sitges Film Festival
- Special Mention at the 2011 Black Film Critics Circle Awards: "Attack The Block is a genre film that defies a number of conventions, not only by having a primarily black cast but portraying each character with a dignity seldom seen on screen and even more rarely in a Science-Fiction film."
- Best First Film at the 2011 Austin Film Critics Association Awards
- Best Original Score at the 2011 Austin Film Critics Association Awards
- Best Actor to John Boyega at the 2011 Black Reel Awards
- Outstanding Foreign Film at the 2011 Black Reel Awards

== Sequel ==
In May 2021, it was announced that Cornish would be writing and directing a sequel, with Boyega set to reprise his role and produce.

Boyega confirmed in May 2025 that the script had been completed.
