= The World's End (soundtrack) =

2013 film soundtrack

The World's End (Original Motion Picture Soundtrack) is the soundtrack to the 2013 film of the same name directed by Edgar Wright. The soundtrack was released on 5 August 2013 in the United Kingdom and 20 August in the United States. Published by ABKCO Records, the album featured several rock numbers of various subgenres such as alternative, indie, psychedelic as well as electronica, Madchester and Britpop ranging from the time period of late-1980s and early 1990s to reflect the character's adolescence.

== Background ==
The album consisted numerous songs that have been selected from the time of the character's adolescence and also from Wright's; as most of them had been chosen while writing the film. He also compiled the playlist containing the selected songs for the crew to listen, which Pegg described as a "blast" with him and Wright delving into the music collection.

…it was like 200 tracks long and it was mostly 1988 to 1993, which is the period where I was in college. They were all like touchstones of a particular time and a lot of the songs I remember being a gateway to more alternative music; it was the period where I stopped listening to pop music and oldies. It really informed me to write the movie.

— Edgar Wright, on compiling the film's music in an interview to IndieWire

Wright recalled that in his early days, he used to discover the songs in chart lists in NME, UK Top 40 and The Chart Show to listen to the indie rock numbers. He recalled that a number of songs in the film "struck hard" during their adolescence, while some of the tracks are remembered: "Loaded" by Primal Scream, "I'm Free" by the Soup Dragons, "Step On" by the Happy Mondays, while the rest were "deserved to be rediscovered". In the film, Gary (Pegg) had a mixtape of the selections as "his character is still living by those rules. It's like he decided to take 'Loaded' and 'I'm Free' to heart and thinks the party's never going to end".

During this process, The Doors' version of "Alabama Song" was quite expensive, according to Nick Angel (the music supervisor) who licensed most of the tracks. Wright had to change two of the tracks to make room for the song. He recalled that he wanted to have "Stormy Weather" by Pixies but dropped down as the rights to the song were too expensive.

As with the previous installments in the Three Flavours Cornetto trilogy: Shaun of the Dead (2004) and Hot Fuzz (2007), Wright listened to horror and action scores, suiting the mood of the film, whereas in case of The World's End, he listened to the selected tracks that suited as the instrumentals and served a "structural importance" to the film. The film marked the maiden collaboration of Steven Price, who was known for scoring Attack the Block (2011) with Wright, who would later work with him in Baby Driver (2017) and Last Night in Soho (2021).

== Reception ==
Heather Phares of AllMusic reviewed "World's End isn't just more entertaining than your average soundtrack, it's also a lot more fun than most compilations of '90s music, making it a worthwhile listen for those who haven't seen the movie but love the sounds of that time." Ryan Leas of Stereogum wrote "The World’s End deploys all its aged pop gems for a purpose. They help further what turns out to be a sober meditation on approaching middle age and facing change (or lack thereof), on how your high school friends and town always seem frozen in the year you left them, and how disorienting it can be to return to them to realize that isn’t the case at all."

== Soundtrack ==
The World's End: Original Motion Picture Soundtrack

Soundtrack album by Various Artists
- Released: 5 August 2013
- Genres: Alternative rock, indie rock, Madchester, alternative dance, Britpop, psychedelic rock, electronica
- Length: 74:59
- Label: ABKCO Records

The soundtrack to the film consisting of songs and dialogue snippets, was released by ABKCO Records on 5 August 2013 in the United Kingdom, and 20 August 2013 in the United States. While the initial release had 18 tracks, the deluxe edition of the soundtrack, which unveiled on 19 August 2013 had ten additional tracks that were not part of the original release.

=== Standard ===
No.	Title	Writer(s)	Artist(s)	Length
1.	"Loaded" (single edit)	Robert Young; Bobby Gillespie; Andrew Innes	Primal Scream	4:21
2.	"There's No Other Way"	Damon Albarn; Alex James; Dave Rowntree; Graham Coxon	Blur	3:19
3.	"I Put This On a Tape for You" (dialogue)	Simon Pegg; Edgar Wright	Simon Pegg and Paddy Considine	0:09
4.	"I'm Free"	Mick Jagger; Keith Richards	The Soup Dragons	3:50
5.	"So Young"	Brett Anderson; Bernard Butler	Suede	3:37
6.	"Do You Remember the First Time?"	Pulp	Pulp	4:22
7.	"Welcome" (dialogue)	Simon Pegg; Edgar Wright	Simon Pegg	0:04
8.	"What You Do to Me"	Norman Blake	Teenage Fanclub	1:57
9.	"Fools Gold" (single edit)	Ian Brown; John Squire	The Stone Roses	4:15
10.	"Get a Life"	Beresford "Jazzie B" Romeo; Hayden "Aitch B" Brown	Soul II Soul	3:36
11.	"We Have Changed" (dialogue)	Simon Pegg; Edgar Wright	Nick Frost	0:07
12.	"Alabama Song (Whisky Bar)"	Kurt Weill; Bertolt Brecht	The Doors	3:16
13.	"Wear Your Love Like Heaven"	Rex "The Red King" Brough; Kevin Clark; B.B. Cunningham; Gary Mewan; Don Weekes	Definition of Sound	3:43
14.	"I Hate This Town" (dialogue)	Simon Pegg; Edgar Wright	Nick Frost	0:04
15.	"20 Seconds to Comply" (World's End Bomb Squad mix re-edit)	Richard Brown	Silver Bullet	4:35
16.	"This Corrosion" (single edit)	Andrew Eldritch	The Sisters of Mercy	4:21
17.	"Happy Hour"	Paul Heaton; Stanley Cullimore	The Housemartins	2:21
18.	"Let's Boo Boo" (dialogue)	Simon Pegg; Edgar Wright	Simon Pegg and Paddy Considine	0:24
Total length:				48:33

=== Deluxe edition ===
No.	Title	Writer(s)	Artist(s)	Length
1.	"Loaded" (single edit)	Robert Young; Bobby Gillespie; Andrew Innes	Primal Scream	4:21
2.	"There's No Other Way"	Damon Albarn; Alex James; Dave Rowntree; Graham Coxon	Blur	3:19
3.	"I Put This On a Tape for You" (dialogue)	Simon Pegg; Edgar Wright	Simon Pegg and Paddy Considine	0:09
4.	"I'm Free"	Mick Jagger; Keith Richards	The Soup Dragons	3:50
5.	"Step On"	John Kongos; Christos Demetriou	Happy Mondays	5:14
6.	"Was The Music Too Loud?" (dialogue)	Simon Pegg; Edgar Wright	Steve Oram and Simon Pegg	0:04
7.	"So Young"	Brett Anderson; Bernard Butler	Suede	3:37
8.	"Old Red Eyes Is Back"	Paul Heaton; Dave Rotheray	The Beautiful South	3:32
9.	"A Humble Taproom" (dialogue)	Simon Pegg; Edgar Wright	Simon Pegg and Nick Frost	0:15
10.	"Come Home" (Flood mix)	Jim Glennie; Tim Booth; Lawrence Gott	James	3:53
11.	"Do You Remember the First Time?"	Pulp	Pulp	4:22
12.	"Welcome" (dialogue)	Simon Pegg; Edgar Wright	Simon Pegg	0:04
13.	"What You Do to Me"	Norman Blake	Teenage Fanclub	1:57
14.	"Fools Gold" (single edit)	Ian Brown; John Squire	The Stone Roses	4:15
15.	"Get a Life"	Beresford "Jazzie B" Romeo; Hayden "Aitch B" Brown	Soul II Soul	3:36
16.	"We Have Changed" (dialogue)	Simon Pegg; Edgar Wright	Nick Frost	0:07
17.	"This Is How It Feels"	Inspiral Carpets	Inspiral Carpets	3:10
18.	"Alabama Song (Whisky Bar)"	Kurt Weill; Bertolt Brecht	The Doors	3:16
19.	"Wear Your Love Like Heaven"	Rex "The Red King" Brough; Kevin Clark; B.B. Cunningham; Gary Mewan; Don Weekes	Definition of Sound	3:43
20.	"This Is What the Kids Want" (dialogue)	Simon Pegg; Edgar Wright	Simon Pegg and Martin Freeman	0:07
21.	"Step Back in Time"	Mike Stock; Pete Waterman; Matt Aitken	Kylie Minogue	3:04
22.	"Join Our Club"	Pete Wiggs; Bob Stanley	Saint Etienne	3:15
23.	"Here's Where the Story Ends"	David Gavurin; Harriet Wheeler	The Sundays	3:52
24.	"I Hate This Town" (dialogue)	Simon Pegg; Edgar Wright	Nick Frost	0:04
25.	"20 Seconds to Comply" (World's End Bomb Squad mix re-edit)	Richard Brown	Silver Bullet	4:35
26.	"This Corrosion" (single edit)	Andrew Eldritch	The Sisters of Mercy	4:21
27.	"Happy Hour"	Paul Heaton; Stanley Cullimore	The Housemartins	2:21
28.	"Let's Boo Boo" (dialogue)	Simon Pegg; Edgar Wright	Simon Pegg and Paddy Considine	0:24

=== Additional music ===
In addition to the following the tracks, the film also featured music not included in the album:

- "The Only One I Know" – The Charlatans
- "Summer's Magic" – Mark Summers
- "The Only Rhyme That Bites" – 808 State
- "20 Seconds To Comply" – Silver Bullet (from the album Bring Down The Walls No Limit Squad Returns; it was re-edited to remove the dialogue samples from RoboCop (1987).

=== Chart performance ===
Chart (2013)	Peak position
UK Compilation Albums (OCC)	52
UK Soundtrack Albums (OCC)	7
US Top Soundtracks (Billboard)	18

== Score ==
The World's End (Original Motion Picture Score)

Film score by Steven Price
- Released: 20 August 2013
- Genre: Film score
- Length: 63:14
- Label: Back Lot Music
- Producer: Steven Price

Steven Price chronology
Attack the Block (2011)	The World's End (2013)	Gravity (2013)

All tracks are written by Steven Price.

No.	Title	Length
1.	"They Called Me the King"	0:54
2.	"The Cross Hands"	4:50
3.	"Has It Got Messy Yet?"	2:09
4.	"Hello Trevor"	1:32
5.	"The Trusty Servant"	2:18
6.	"The Two Headed Dog"	2:46
7.	"We're Way Past Leaving Now"	0:50
8.	"The Mermaid"	3:12
9.	"To the Beehive"	1:47
10.	"I Hate This Town"	1:17
11.	"Break It Up"	3:21
12.	"The Smokehouse"	4:09
13.	"I'm Disappointed In You"	2:05
14.	"The King's Head"	1:27
15.	"Put the Pint Down"	4:00
16.	"The World's End"	3:17
17.	"Cosmic Intervention"	7:14
18.	"You Had To Go and Spoil It"	3:21
19.	"The Morning After"	4:10
20.	"There's Only One Gary King" (Osymyso's Inibri-8 Megamix)	4:24
21.	"There's Only One Gary King" (Osymyso's Inibri-8 Megamix) (Instrumental)	4:11
Total length:		63:14
