= Edgar Wright's unrealized projects =

During his career, British film director Edgar Wright has worked on a number of projects which never progressed beyond the pre-production stage under his direction. Some of these projects fell in development hell, were officially cancelled, or would see life under a different production team.

== 2000s ==
=== From Dusk Till Shaun ===
The prospect of a sequel to Shaun of the Dead was first brought up on the commentary track for the film's home media release, with the proposed title From Dusk Till Shaun. Simon Pegg, star and co-writer of the film, stated in a 2017 interview that he had drawn up a treatment for a sequel, with Wright suggesting that vampires would replace zombies. However both men felt that the first film worked better as a stand-alone film, in addition to the events of the film making a sequel seem improbable. A reference to the proposed sequel was made in the 2018 film Spider-Man: Into the Spider-Verse. In a 2021 interview with Total Film, Jessica Hynes revealed that a Yvonne of the Dead spin-off had been considered, set parallel with the events of Shaun of the Dead.

=== Ant-Man ===
Wright had been developing a live-action film based on the Marvel Comics superhero Ant-Man with Joe Cornish since 2006. However, on 23 May 2014, Wright and Marvel Studios issued a joint statement announcing that Wright would exit the movie due to creative differences. According to Wright, he had been hired as writer-director but became unhappy when Marvel wanted to write a new script. In 2017, he said: "The most diplomatic answer is I wanted to make a Marvel movie but I don't think they really wanted to make an Edgar Wright movie ... having written all my other movies, that's a tough thing to move forward. Suddenly becoming a director for hire on it, you’re sort of less emotionally invested and you start to wonder why you’re there, really." He was replaced by Peyton Reed as director, with Adam McKay and star Paul Rudd rewriting the screenplay. He and Cornish received both screenplay and story credits, with Wright also credited as executive producer.

=== Don't ===
In April 2007, it was reported that Wright may expand Don't, a fake trailer he had made for Grindhouse, into a feature film. According to Eli Roth, he and Wright have discussed the possibility of pairing Don't with Thanksgiving for a Grindhouse sequel. Roth is quoted as saying "We're talking to Dimension about it. I think they're still trying to figure out Grindhouse 1 before we think about Grindhouse 2, but I've already been working on the outline for it and I would do it in a heartbeat." Nothing further on the idea had been announced since. Roth subsequently released Thanksgiving on its own in 2023.

== 2010s ==
=== The Night Stalker ===
Wright had been hired by Disney in February 2012 to direct a feature film adaptation of the 1970s television series with Johnny Depp cast to play Carl Kolchak. D.V. DeVincentis had been hired to write the screenplay in May 2012, with the project still in active development by May 2014 and the project Wright was expected to begin work on after exiting his director position on Ant-Man.

=== Collider ===
Wright was hired by Paramount Pictures in July 2012 to direct a science fiction film titled Collider, which he would co-write with Mark Protosevich as well as produce alongside J. J. Abrams and Nira Park. No further announcements were made in the film past that point.

=== Grasshopper Jungle ===
In July 2014, Wright was announced as director of the film adaptation of Andrew Smith's novel Grasshopper Jungle for Sony Pictures. However by March 2020 no further development on the film had been announced.

=== Untitled Pegg/Frost film trilogy ===
On August 20, 2014, Wright and Simon Pegg said that they were trying to make a new movie trilogy, but would not continue the Three Flavours Cornetto trilogy. By May 2025, new developments were announced by Pegg.

=== Dodge and Twist ===
In January 2015, Wright submitted a re-write of the screenplay, which would see the story of Oliver Twist pick up twenty years later, where Twist would be a police officer tangling with a still active Artful Dodger. Ahmet Zappa would produce with Matt Tolmach, and actors Andrew Garfield and Eddie Redmayne were envisioned for the lead roles.

=== Fortunately, The Milk ===
In October 2015, Wright was announced as director of the film adaptation of Neil Gaiman's novel Fortunately, The Milk. The time-travel story will be a hybrid of live-action and animation. The film was to star Johnny Depp, with a screenplay co-written by Wright and Flight of the Conchords alumnus Bret McKenzie.

=== Shadows ===
In November 2015, it was announced that Wright would direct and co-write with David Walliams a DreamWorks Animation film centred on "the concept of shadows", that has been in development since 2010. Shadows, as the film was known, was to be Wright's animation directorial debut. The film has been in development for a long time, changing directors. Mark Dindal, who created the film's original story, was involved between 2010 and 2012, was replaced by Alessandro Carloni from 2012 to 2015, and Wright is slated to develop the picture. Three drafts of the script were written but the project is on hold due to staff changes at DreamWorks leaving it in limbo.

=== Baby Driver 2 ===
Discussions of a sequel began in December 2017, with Wright announcing his intent to develop a script to the media. The writer-director began drafting the screenplay in January 2019, introducing an ensemble of new characters to advance the story. By July 2019, Wright had shown Ansel Elgort a copy of the completed script, currently under a tentative working title. In January 2021, Wright confirmed that he had finished writing the sequel's script. In October 2025, Wright reiterated that the script was complete and that he was just waiting for timing, financing and cast availability to align.

== 2020s ==
=== Set My Heart to Five ===
In March 2020, it was announced that Wright would be directing an adaptation of the book Set My Heart To Five by Simon Stephenson, who would also have written the screenplay. The story follows an android dentist named Jared in the year 2054, as he undergoes an emotional awakening after he is introduced to the world of 80s and 90s movies. The film was set to be produced by Working Title Films and Focus Features.

=== The Chain ===
In June 2020, Deadline Hollywood reported that Wright would direct an adaptation of the 2019 novel The Chain by Adrian McKinty for Universal Pictures, with the screenplay written by Jane Goldman. It was scheduled to go into production in late 2023, but filming was cancelled due to scheduling issues related to 2023 SAG-AFTRA strike. By January 2026, Damon Lindelof replaced Wright, for a release on HBO.

=== Stage 13 ===
In July 2020, Deadline reported that Amblin Partners had closed a deal for Wright to develop, direct and executive produce Stage 13, a film based on Simon Rich's short story about the ghost of a silent film actress who meets a struggling director. Rich was set to write the script and produce, alongside Nira Park.

=== Barbarella remake ===
In 2024, Wright was in talks to direct Sydney Sweeney as Barbarella in a remake of the 1968 film, for Sony Pictures. By June 2026, Wright was confirmed to direct Barbarella.

=== Bond 26 ===
In a 2025 report published by Puck, Wright was revealed as one of several directors who were in negotiations with producers Amy Pascal and David Heyman to direct the 26th James Bond film at Amazon MGM Studios. Denis Villeneuve would ultimately be chosen as the director.

== Offers ==
=== Mission: Impossible - Ghost Protocol ===
In March 2010, it was announced that Wright was offered the position to direct the fourth Mission: Impossible movie, which Andre Nemec and Josh Appelbaum have written the screenplay. The movie ended up as Mission: Impossible – Ghost Protocol and Brad Bird directed it.
