= Patricia Franklin =

English actress (born 1942)

- Born: 11 September 1942 (age 83); East Finchley, London, England
- Education: Royal Academy of Dramatic Art (RADA)
- Occupation: Actress
- Years active: 1967—present
- Spouse: Frank Hatherley
- Children: 3

Patricia Franklin (born 11 September 1942) is an English actress best known for her roles in five Carry On films.

== Early life ==
Born in East Finchley, London, Franklin and her family frequently went to see shows at the nearby amateur theatre; after seeing that the theatre company, Mountview Academy of Theatre Arts, offered drama classes, Franklin decided to join. After appearing in several productions, Franklin joined Royal Academy of Dramatic Art (RADA).

== Career ==
Upon leaving RADA, Franklin's first acting role was as a hostess in an episode of At Last The 1948 Show in 1968. After this, she spent nine months in the West End in Uproar in the House with Joan Sims and Peter Butterworth. The producer of the Carry On films Peter Rogers was in the audience as Sims and Butterworth were regulars in the series and offered Franklin a part in the next film which she accepted. Franklin's first film role was playing a farmer's daughter in Carry On Camping (1969) in several scenes depicting a series of mix-ups between her father (Derek Francis), Charles Hawtrey and Terry Scott.

Impressed with Franklin's performance in Carry On Camping, Rogers offered Franklin another role in his next film Carry On Again Doctor (1969) as a nurse although she had to turn it down as she was busy in a production of Edward Bond's play Saved at the Royal Court Theatre. In 1970, Franklin appeared in Carry On Loving in a scene with Bill Maynard as an incompatible married couple seeking advice from an incompetent marriage guidance counsellor (Kenneth Williams) before playing a woman arguing with Marianne Stone at a jumble sale in the film Bless This House (1972). Franklin followed this with her largest role in a Carry On film; as Rosemary, June Whitfield's right-hand woman in a Women's Liberation scheme to sabotage a beauty contest orchestrated by Sid James in an otherwise dull seaside town in Carry On Girls (1973).

After several television roles, including Fraud Squad, The Legend of Robin Hood, Centre Play and a part in the film Brief Encounter (1974), Franklin starred in Carry On Behind (1975) as the nagging wife of Jack Douglas who goes on a camping holiday with his friend Windsor Davies to escape their wives; the final scene depicts Franklin and Davies' wife Liz Fraser finding Douglas and Davies in a compromising position with two young scantily clad fellow campers played by Carol Hawkins and Sherrie Hewson. Franklin followed this with a role in an episode of The Sweeney entitled "Bad Apple" before making her final role in a Carry On film as a militant army cook in Carry On England (1976).

Franklin then went on to have several television credits include Play for Today, Black Books, Silent Witness and four episodes of The Bill. She later appeared in all three films in Edgar Wright's and Simon Pegg's Three Flavours Cornetto trilogy: Shaun of the Dead (2004), Hot Fuzz (2007) and World's End (2013). Since then, she has had many more roles including appearing in two episodes of The Alienist and starring in the Christmas film Jingle Jangle: A Christmas Journey (2020).

== Personal life ==
Franklin is married to the Australian dramatist Frank Hatherley; they have three daughters. Their youngest daughter is guitarist, composer and solo artist Charlotte Hatherley.

== Filmography ==
=== Film ===
Year	Title	Role	Notes
1969	Carry On Camping	Farmer's Daughter	
1970	Carry On Loving	Mrs. Dreery	
1972	Bless This House	Mary	
1973	Carry On Girls	Rosemary	
1974	Brief Encounter	Beryl	
1975	Carry On Behind	Vera Bragg	
1976	Carry On England	Corporal Cook	
2004	Shaun of the Dead	Spinster	
2007	Hot Fuzz	Annette Roper	
2008	Puthuni Hambagiya	Alex Balton	
2013	The World's End	Beehive Lady	
2017	Mantis	Granny Berenice	
2018	The Underwoods of Napa Valley	News Reporter	
2020	Jingle Jangle: A Christmas Journey	Pawn Shop Customer	
2021	The Kindred	Johanna	
2021	Followers	Librarian	
2022	Free Spirits	Audrey	

=== Television ===
Year	Title	Role	Notes
1968	At Last the 1948 Show	Hostess	Episode: #1.2
1969	Fraud Squad	Gloria	Episode: "All Clean and Paid For"
1970	ITV Sunday Night Theatre	Emma Hill	Episode: “Mrs. Mouse, Are You Within?”
1973	Sam	Grace	Episode: "Home from Home"
1974	Play for Today	Sally	Episode: "Joe's Ark"
1974	Seven Faces of Woman	Betty	Episodes: "A Woman's Estate"
1975	Centre Play	Telephone Caller	Episode: "Post Mortem"
1975	The Legend of Robin Hood	Prioress	Episode: "Part 6"
1976	Play for Today	Pamela Mercer	Episode: "A Story to Frighten the Children"
1976	The Sweeney	Mrs. Perraut	Episode: "Bad Apple"
1977	Holding On	Ann Naylor	2 episodes
1977	General Hospital	Joyce Woodrow	Episode: "Think Small"
1978	Hazell	Bet Ryman	Episode: "Hazell and the Rubber-Heel Brigade"
1979	Kids	Betty Turner	Episode: "Jodie and Sal"
1990	The Bill	Woman Neighbour	Episode: “Lies”
1993	The Bill	Mrs. Gibson	Episode: “Mighty Atoms”
1996	Silent Witness	Woman at Cemetery	Episode: "Buried Lies: Part 2"
1997	The Bill	Cafe Owner	Episode: “Confidence”
1998	The Bill	Mrs. King	Episode: “Bad Chemistry”
2004	Black Books	Keen Customer	Episode: "Travel Writer"
2020	The Alienist	Margery	2 episodes
2024	Call the Midwife	Elsie Sweeney	Episode: #13.3
