= A Fistful of Fingers =

1995 film by Edgar Wright

- Poster for the 20th anniversary
- Directed by: Edgar Wright
- Written by: Edgar Wright
- Produced by: Edgar Wright; Daniel Figuero; Zygi Kamasa; Gareth Owen
- Cinematography: Alvin Leong
- Edited by: Giles Harding
- Music by: François Evans
- Production company: Wrightstuff Pictures
- Distributed by: Blue Dolphin Film Distribution
- Release date: 24 November 1995
- Running time: 78 minutes
- Country: United Kingdom
- Language: English
- Budget: $15,000

A Fistful of Fingers is a 1995 British Western comedy film written and directed by Edgar Wright in his feature-length directorial debut. The film depicts a cowboy who follows a wanted man who caused the death of his horse Easy.

== Plot ==
In a cold open, two bandits kill a man and begin looting his belongings. No-Name arrives and kills them after a brief conversation.

On the way into Deadwood Town, No-Name comes across a bounty poster for a man named The Squint. He eventually encounters the man in town and chases him into the woods nearby. After a prolonged gunfight, The Squint tricks No-Name's horse Easy into running off a cliff to its death and subsequently escapes. After burying Easy, No-Name returns to town and interrogates the townsfolk until he learns The Squint's whereabouts.

On The Squint's path, No-Name has a strange encounter with a man whose face is covered by a red bandana. Soon after, he encounters a native man named Chin Chakanawa who decides to join No-Name on his quest. They run into trouble when another native man blocks their path. They attempt to get by him by disguising themselves as nuns, but the ploy fails and he begins beating them up. However, two passing hicks believe them to be genuine nuns in danger and kill the other native man. After killing the hicks, No-Name discovers an invitation on one of their bodies to a meet-up of outlaws.

The duo rest up for the night. No-Name teaches Chin how to shoot. Chin reveals his name means 'Running Sore' and No-Name reveals that his name is actually Walter.

The following morning the duo encounters a man named Jimmy James who decides to join them on their quest. The trio soon finds The Squint and a number of other outlaws digging for treasure. No-Name knocks out a guard and disguises himself to approach The Squint, but the disguise fails and No-Name runs off with The Squint and the other outlaws in hot pursuit. Just as the outlaws catch up with him, Chin creates a distraction, leaving only one of the outlaws to guard No-Name. After No-Name fails to get Jimmy's attention, Chin circles back and kills the guard. The duo picks off the rest of the outlaws one-by-one, but Chin says that No-Name must face the final confrontation with The Squint alone.

No-Name approaches The Squint and they stare each other down. No-Name reveals that years ago, The Squint had destroyed No-Name's sandcastle, twisted his arm, given him a noogie, and piled on him with several other boys. After the flashback the two get into an argument about how Westerns usually end, particularly Butch Cassidy and the Sundance Kid. A fight ensues. No-Name appears to shoot The Squint to death, but The Squint gets up for one last attack before finally being killed by the strange man with the red bandana. Chin arrives and reveals that the man is the ghost of Sheriff Marshall. Sheriff Marshall's ghost reveals the treasure to the duo, which ends up being both gold as well as evidence that the late Sheriff was No-Name's father. As they prepare to leave, No-Name sees that his horse Easy is still alive. Jeremy Beadle shows up and reveals it was all a prank and the heroes ride off into the sunset.

== Cast ==
- Graham Low as No-Name
- Oli van der Vijver as The Squint
- Nicola Stapleton as Floozy
- Martin Curtis as The Running Sore
- Jeremy Beadle as himself
- Neil Mullarkey as The Stand Up Comedian
- Dan Palmer as The "Pile-On" Kid
- Mark Sheffield as Calamity Keith
- James Lance as Grindolini
- Edgar Wright as The Cheesy Voiceover Artist / The Two Bit Farmer Cameo
- Quentin Green as Jimmy James
- Toby Kendrick as The Outlaw
- Robert Yarde as Laughing Bob
- Baz Jones as The Tortilla Kid (credited as Steve Jones)

== Release ==
It opened at the Prince Charles Cinema on 24 November 1995, and debuted in the United States 20 years later at the Cinefamily in Los Angeles as a midnight movie.

The film was never commercially available on home video in either country, although Wright said in 2015 that he hoped to "finally release it [...] with a commentary and everything."

== Reception ==
Derek Elley of Variety said the film showed "more wit and invention than most of its no-budget Brit saddlemates." Time Out said, "Wright may not be in the class of Robert Rodriguez, but he has talent", and said the film was "[b]est seen after a couple of beers." Nick Allen of RogerEbert.com called it "...delightfully dorky, irreverent and scrappy, the exact kind of project a young filmmaker would make if they just wanted to make fellow nerds laugh and were pretty good at doing so." Ethan Anderton of SlashFilm said, "What makes [the film] so delightful is that it's a spaghetti western send-up that respects the genre as much as it makes fun of it." Stark of Pornokitsch said, "As a Western, it's good fun, and as a debut, it's a hell of an effort." Ramsey Ess of Vulture said, "While [the film is] missing many of the trademark editorial flourishes and camera tricks that would be adopted by the time Shaun of the Dead came around, it's still a well-constructed, quickly paced piece of work."
