= Attack the Block (soundtrack) =

Attack the Block (Original Music from the Motion Picture)

Soundtrack album by Steven Price and Basement Jaxx
- Released: 16 May 2011
- Studio: Abbey Road Studios, London
- Genre: Electronica; grime; hip hop
- Length: 50:57
- Label: Decca Records

Steven Price chronology
Attack the Block (2011)	The World's End (2013)

Basement Jaxx chronology
Focus on Atlantic Jaxx (2010)	Attack the Block (2011)	Basement Jaxx vs. Metropole Orkest (2011)

Attack the Block (Original Music from the Motion Picture) is the soundtrack to the 2011 film Attack the Block that featured the original score composed by Felix Buxton and Simon Ratcliffe from the British electronic music group Basement Jaxx and film composer Steven Price, in his scoring debut. Decca Records released the soundtrack to the film on 16 May 2011 to critical acclaim.

== Background ==
In January 2011, The Guardian-writer Sean Michaels posted that Basement Jaxx would score for the film, which would mark their full-fledged scoring venture, despite contributing to the soundtracks of Bend It Like Beckham (2002) and Just Married (2003). Steven Price also accompanied the band scoring the film; having previously worked in The Lord of the Rings: The Two Towers (2002), The Lord of the Rings: The Return of the King (2003), Batman Begins (2005) and Scott Pilgrim vs. the World (2010), the film marked Price's feature scoring debut.

Joe Cornish did not want the film to accompany Dizzee Rascal singles, or other grime artists that accompany the film. He wanted a properly composed score that accompany adventure films. He further wanted to evoke John Carpenter's electronic music and John Williams' orchestral score which would fit with the "fantasy stuff, the scenes with the aliens, and the style to match with the energy of the gang". Cornish called it as "a really detailed, quirky, rhythmic score, but the action always drives the score, never the other way around".

During Evan Sawdey's interview with the duo for PopMatters, he mentioned the album as an "obscure soundtrack placement that only hardcore aficionados found out about."

== Release ==
On 4 May 2011, a cue from Basement Jaxx's score, "The Ends" which played in the film's climatic sequences had been released for preview. A soundtrack featuring Jaxx and Price's score was released by Decca Records on 16 May 2011, five days after the film's UK release. In January 2018, I Am Shark reissued the soundtrack on a double LP vinyl pressing featuring exclusive written commentaries from Joe Cornish and Steven Price. The album packaging represents the monsters with glow-in-the-dark teeth on the labels and glow colored vinyl.

== Reception ==
Tom Breihan of Pitchfork commenting on "The Ends" wrote that "the theme sounds like a someone injected steroids into the Tangerine Dream score for a random early-80s action movie". Writing for AllMusic, Jon O'Brien said "Attack the Block is perhaps a little too samey to be held in the same regard as Daft Punk's Tron: [Legacy] or Chemical Brothers' Hanna (Price's four solo classical pieces are a much-needed and welcome respite), but it's a promising first cinematic effort which should prick up the ears of any sci-fi comedy director looking for an exciting and pulsating musical accompaniment." R. L. Shaffer of IGN praised the score, calling it as "incredibly diverse and original". David Rooney of The Hollywood Reporter wrote "the propulsive dynamic of Steven Price’s techno score, incorporates driving beats from house music duo Felix Burton and Simon Ratcliffe of Basement Jaxx".

Oliver Lyletton of IndieWire, in his "best of scores and soundtracks in 2011" had mentioned Attack the Block in the list and wrote "With big, chunky beats and ominous electronics, it immediately brings to mind the atmospheric synthetics of the great John Carpenter scores, particularly Assault on Precinct 13. But instead of being just some dusty pastiche, Basement Jaxx have crafted something vitally new and very much alive. The way they weave subtle orchestration, along with sing-songy rapping, into the main theme, is absolutely brilliant and unforgettable, especially when paired with the comic book-y images (the theme crescendos right as we’re going underneath the Nostromo-style apartment building). Or imagine the final showdown between Moses and the monsters without that goosebump-y electronic twinkle – you can't. Few movies this year paired musician and material quite as well as the Basement Jaxx and Attack the Block." In Empire's Music Playlist of 2011, Phil de Semlyen listed "Get That Snitch" and wrote "this Attack The Block gem was more O.G. than E.T. [the Extra-Terrestrial]. Rapper-turned-comedian Doc Brown provided the lyrics and Jumayn Hunter, Hi-Hatz in the film, popped up to prove that his talents reached beyond the screen."

== Accolades ==
Award	Category	Recipient	Result	Ref.
Austin Film Critics Association	Best Original Score	Steven Price; Basement Jaxx	Won	
Black Reel Awards	Best Original Score	Steven Price; Basement Jaxx	Nominated	
Fangoria Chainsaw Awards	Best Score	Steven Price; Basement Jaxx	Nominated	
Sitges Film Festival	Best Original Soundtrack	Steven Price; Basement Jaxx	Won	

== Track listing ==
All songs written by Steven Price, Felix Buxton & Simon Ratcliffe, except where noted.

No.	Title	Writer(s)	Length
1.	"The Block"		3:07
2.	"Sam Is Mugged"		4:15
3.	"Round Two Bruv"		2:49
4.	"It's Raining Gollums"		1:07
5.	"Tooling Up"		2:26
6.	"Moses Is Arrested"		5:24
7.	"Tell Me I'm Dreaming"		4:36
8.	"Throat Ripper"		0:49
9.	"Rooftops"		4:02
10.	"Moses - Ninja"		4:03
11.	"Just Another Day"		1:25
12.	"They Want Moses"		2:05
13.	"Actions Have Consequences"		1:52
14.	"Eat My Hat"	Steven Price	1:41
15.	"They Fell Out of the Sky"	Steven Price	1:28
16.	"I Need to Finish What I Started"	Steven Price	0:42
17.	"Turn the Gas Up"		3:26
18.	"Moses vs The Monsters"		2:00
19.	"Moses the Hero"	Steven Price	2:01
20.	"The Ends"	Basement Jaxx	2:08

== Personnel ==
Credits adapted from CD liner notes.

- Artwork – Rumney Design
- Conductor – Geoffrey Alexander
- Assistant contractor – Lucy Whalley
- Contractor – Isobel Griffiths
- Orchestra leader – Everton Nelson
- Liner notes – Joe Cornish
- Mastering – Jacko
- Mixing – Gareth Cousins
- Orchestration – Andrew Fisher, David Butterworth
- Project manager – Kevin Long
- Recording – Andrew Dudman
- Music supervisor – Nick Angel
- Music composer and producer – Basement Jaxx, Steven Price
