= Sir Bernard's Stately Homes =

British TV comedy series written by and starring Matt Lucas and David Walliams

- Genre: Comedy
- Written by: Matt Lucas; David Walliams
- Directed by: Edgar Wright
- Starring: Matt Lucas; David Walliams
- Composers: Tim Atack; Matt Lucas
- Country of origin: United Kingdom
- Original language: English
- No. of episodes: 6

Production
- Executive producer: Jon Plowman
- Producer: Myfanwy Moore
- Editor: Robin Parsons
- Running time: 10 minutes
- Production company: BBC

Original release
- Network: BBC Two
- Release: 12 May – 16 June 1999

Sir Bernard's Stately Homes is a British TV comedy series first shown in 1999 on BBC Two and later repeated on Play UK. Only six ten-minute programmes were produced, all written by and starring Matt Lucas and David Walliams. It bore many similarities to the more well-known Rock Profile. The series was directed by Edgar Wright, and produced by Myfanwy Moore, who would become the producer of Little Britain.

== Plot ==
The central character is Bernard Chumley, played by Matt Lucas, who was already a regular stand-up character of Lucas' and would go on to be a fixture of Little Britain. In each edition, Sir Bernard and his friend Anthony Rogers would investigate a number of country estates while searching for the Golden Potato, an advertising stunt which would win them a year's supply of Allen's Crisps ("the cheaper crisp!")

Each house is named after a character or actor from Grange Hill. Further popular culture is revisited at the end of episode 5, in which the pair eat snacks on a rollercoaster dressed as scouts, in a similar fashion to a group of scouts in a well-known edition of Jim'll Fix It. David Foxxe, Paul Putner, Rowland Rivron, Rhys Thomas, and Julie T. Wallace appeared throughout the series. The script editor was Barry Cryer.

== Episodes ==
No.	Title	Original release date
1	"Baxter Grange"	12 May 1999
First of a six-part spoof documentary series in which renowned theatrical raconteur Sir Bernard Chumley - with his criminal sidekick, Anthony Rodgers - tours the stately homes of the good and the great. Tonight, they visit the past home of Lord Nelson, aiming to fill the great admiral's shoes in more ways than one.
2	"Browning Abbey"	19 May 1999
Second of a six-part spoof documentary series in which renowned theatrical raconteur Sir Bernard Chumley - with his criminal sidekick Anthony Rodgers - tours the stately homes of the good and the great. Tonight they visit the fictional Browning Abbey where they are soon waylaid by a treasure hunt for the elusive Golden Potato, the prize for which is a year's supply of crisps.
3	"Yates Castle"	26 May 1999
Sir Bernard meets his match in the shape of a sex maniac called Dame Lily who takes him hostage. A game of strip poker is the only way to win his freedom.
4	"Bronson House"	2 June 1999
At the palatial retreat of the Princess Royal, Chumley discovers a rival film crew.
5	"Kendall Park"	9 June 1999
Things get a little gruesome for Chumley and Rodgers when they visit spooky Kendal Park.
6	"Stebson Towers"	16 June 1999
The spoof documentary series ends with Sir Bernard and Anthony closing in on the glittering Golden Potato.
