= Hot Fuzz =

2007 film by Edgar Wright

- British theatrical release poster
- Directed by: Edgar Wright
- Written by: Edgar Wright; Simon Pegg
- Produced by: Nira Park; Tim Bevan; Eric Fellner
- Starring: Simon Pegg; Nick Frost; Jim Broadbent
- Cinematography: Jess Hall
- Edited by: Chris Dickens
- Music by: David Arnold
- Production companies: Working Title Films; Big Talk Productions
- Distributed by: Rogue Pictures (through Focus Features; North America); Universal Pictures (International); StudioCanal (France)
- Release date: 13 February 2007 (UK)
- Running time: 121 minutes
- Country: United Kingdom
- Language: English
- Budget: US$12–16 million
- Box office: $80.7 million

Hot Fuzz is a 2007 British action comedy film directed by Edgar Wright and written by Wright and Simon Pegg. Pegg stars as Nicholas Angel, an elite police officer who is reassigned to a West Country village and investigates a series of gruesome deaths. Nick Frost co-stars as Police Constable Danny Butterman, Angel's partner.

Hot Fuzz is the second and most commercially successful film in the Three Flavours Cornetto trilogy, following Shaun of the Dead and followed by The World's End. More than 100 action films were used as inspiration for the script. Principal photography took place in Wells, Somerset, for eleven weeks and ten artists worked on VFX, which involved explosions, gory gunfire scenes and a flip book.

Hot Fuzz premiered on 13 February 2007 in the United Kingdom. It received acclaim and grossed US$80 million worldwide on a budget of $12–16 million. In 2020, Empire named it the 67th-greatest film of the 21st century.

== Plot ==
Nicholas Angel, a recently promoted Metropolitan Police Sergeant, is reassigned to the rural town of Sandford, Gloucestershire for being too exceptional, despite his desire to continue in London. On his first night in town, Angel arrests Danny Butterman for drunk driving, but discovers the next morning that he is the son of Inspector Frank Butterman, and a police officer himself. Angel is frustrated by the village's mundanity, his and Frank's incompetent colleagues, and the Neighbourhood Watch Alliance (NWA)'s focus on low crime statistics over law enforcement. Angel and Danny stop Martin Blower and Eve Draper, the two lead actors of a local amateur production of Romeo and Juliet, for speeding. A cloaked figure later decapitates them with an axe, staging their deaths as a car crash. Although only Angel suspects foul play, Danny begins to follow Angel's lead and take crime more seriously.

After confiscating an illegal weapons stash, including an old sea mine, from farmer Arthur Webley, Angel and Danny slowly bond while they binge-watch action-film DVDs at Danny's house. That night, a cloaked figure attacks wealthy land developer George Merchant in his home, and murders him via gas explosion. Angel suspects that the deaths are linked to a recent property deal. Tim Messenger, a local journalist for the Sandford Citizen newspaper, approaches Angel at the village fête, claiming to have information, but is murdered when a cloaked figure dislodges a piece of masonry from the church's tower. Angel learns from Leslie Tiller, the village florist, about her plans to sell her land to Merchant's business partners. While Angel is retrieving his notebook from his police car, a cloaked figure murders Leslie with her garden shears and escapes. Angel suspects Simon Skinner, manager of the Somerfield supermarket, as the property deal would have built a rival, but Skinner provides an alibi.

Surmising that there are multiple killers, Angel learns about a secret NWA meeting at Sandford Castle after a cloaked and hooded figure attacks him in his room at the Swan Hotel, whom he unmasks as Michael "Lurch" Armstrong, an employee of Skinner's, and incapacitates. The NWA members reveal they staged the murders they committed as accidents because each victim threatened Sandford's chances of winning "Village of the Year". Frank emerges as the leader, explaining that his deceased wife Irene, Danny's mother, put everything into helping Sandford win the inaugural competition, but travellers moved in and ruined their chances the night before the adjudicators arrived, driving her to suicide; Frank subsequently vowed to help Sandford win "Village of the Year" annually, however possible. Angel flees, but stumbles into the castle's catacombs, discovering the corpses of the NWA's victims, some of whom he had arrested earlier. Danny suddenly appears and feigns murdering Angel.

Pretending to dispose of him, Danny implores Angel to return to London. However, an encounter with a display of action-movie DVDs while at a motorway service station inspires Angel to reverse course to Sandford. Purloining the confiscated guns from the police station, Angel confronts the NWA in a shootout, accompanied by Danny. When Frank orders the other officers to arrest them, the pair successfully convinces them of Frank's complicity.

Frank flees, and the police besiege the supermarket, with Skinner escaping via police car with Frank. Following a high-speed chase and shootout, Angel corners Skinner at Sandford's model village. After a fight, Skinner lands atop a miniature church steeple that impales his Adam's apple, but survives. Frank attempts escape in Angel's car, but a swan that the pair had recaptured earlier ambushes him, causing him to crash. Angel's former superiors ask him to return to London as the crime rate has increased in his absence, but Angel declines, content with Sandford.

While the officers are reviewing paperwork for the many arrests, Professor Tom Weaver, the last remaining NWA member, enters the squad room wielding a blunderbuss. He fires at Angel, but Danny intercepts the hit, causing Angel to kick a wastebasket at Weaver. While stumbling backwards, Weaver accidentally activates the sea mine, killing himself and destroying the station. One year later, Angel has been promoted to Inspector and Danny, having survived, has been promoted to Sergeant. After visiting Irene's grave, the two drive to their next crime scene.

== Cast ==
- Simon Pegg as Nicholas Angel, a high-achieving police officer who is transferred from London to Sandford
- Nick Frost as Danny Butterman, a Sandford police officer and Angel's partner
- Jim Broadbent as Police Inspector Frank Butterman, Danny's father
- Paddy Considine as Detective Sergeant Andy Wainwright, Sandford Police
- Timothy Dalton as Simon Skinner, the manager of the Somerfield supermarket in Sandford
- Bill Nighy as Police Chief Inspector Kenneth, from the Metropolitan Police in London
- Billie Whitelaw as Joyce Cooper, who runs the Swan Hotel where Nicholas stays
- Edward Woodward as Professor Tom Weaver, a professor who represents the Neighbourhood Watch Alliance
- Bill Bailey as Sergeants Turner, both twin-brother desk sergeants at Sandford
- David Bradley as Arthur Webley, a Sandford farmer with an impenetrable accent
- Adam Buxton as Tim Messenger, journalist at the Sandford Citizen
- Olivia Colman as PC Doris Thatcher, the sole female police officer in Sandford
- Ron Cook as George Merchant, a land developer in Sandford
- Kenneth Cranham as James Reaper, a farmer in Sandford
- Julia Deakin as Mary Porter, Roy's wife and the landlady of The Crown pub in Sandford
- Kevin Eldon as Sergeant Tony Fisher, Sandford Police
- Martin Freeman as Sergeant, from the Metropolitan Police in London
- Paul Freeman as the Rev. Philip Shooter, an Anglican cleric in Sandford
- Karl Johnson as PC Bob Walker, the oldest officer in the Sandford police
- Lucy Punch as Eve Draper, an amateur actress who works for the Sandford town council's planning department
- Anne Reid as Leslie Tiller, a florist in Sandford
- Rafe Spall as Detective Constable Andy Cartwright, Sandford Police
- David Threlfall as Martin Blower, a solicitor and amateur actor
- Peter Wight as Roy Porter, Mary's husband and the landlord of The Crown pub in Sandford
- Stuart Wilson as Dr Robin Hatcher, the town's doctor
- Robert Popper as 'Not' Janine, whom Nicholas mistakes for Janine
- Joe Cornish as Bob, a forensics investigator whom Nicholas suspects is in a relationship with Janine
- Chris Waitt as Dave, a forensics investigator who is actually in a relationship with Janine
- Eric Mason as Bernard Cooper, Joyce's husband who co-runs the Swan Hotel
- Lorraine Hilton as Amanda Paver, the headmistress of Sandford Primary School
- Patricia Franklin as Annette Roper, a shopkeeper
- Stephen Merchant as Peter Ian Staker, a resident of Sandford
- Tim Barlow as Mr. Treacher, an old man resident in Sandford
- Ben McKay as Peter Cocker, a shoplifter in Sandford
- Rory McCann as Michael Armstrong / "Lurch", a huge but dimwitted Somerfield employee
- Alice Lowe as Tina, an employee at the Somerfield supermarket
- Maria Charles as Mrs. Reaper, James Reaper's mother

Uncredited roles and cameo appearances include Cate Blanchett as Janine, Nicholas' ex-girlfriend and a Metropolitan Police forensics investigator; Steve Coogan as a Metropolitan Police Inspector, Peter Jackson as a demented man dressed as Father Christmas; Garth Jennings as a crackhead armed with a Kalashnikov, and director Edgar Wright as a shelf stacker at Somerfield.

== Production ==
=== Development ===
Director Edgar Wright wanted to write and direct a cop film because "there isn't really any tradition of cop films in the UK... We felt that every other country in the world had its own tradition of great cop action films and we had none." Wright and Pegg spent eighteen months writing the script. The first draft took eight months to develop, and after watching 138 cop-related films for dialogue and plot ideas and conducting more than fifty interviews with police officers for research, the script was completed after another nine months. The title was based on the various two-word titles of action films in the 1980s and 1990s. In one interview Wright declared that he "wanted to make a title that really had very little meaning... like Lethal Weapon and Point Break and Executive Decision." In the same interview, Pegg joked that many action films' titles "seem to be generated from two hats filled with adjectives and nouns and you just, 'Okay, that'll do.'" While writing the script, Wright, as well as Pegg, intended to include Frost as the partner for Pegg's character. Frost would do the film only if he could name his character, and he chose "Danny Butterman".

=== Preparation and filming ===
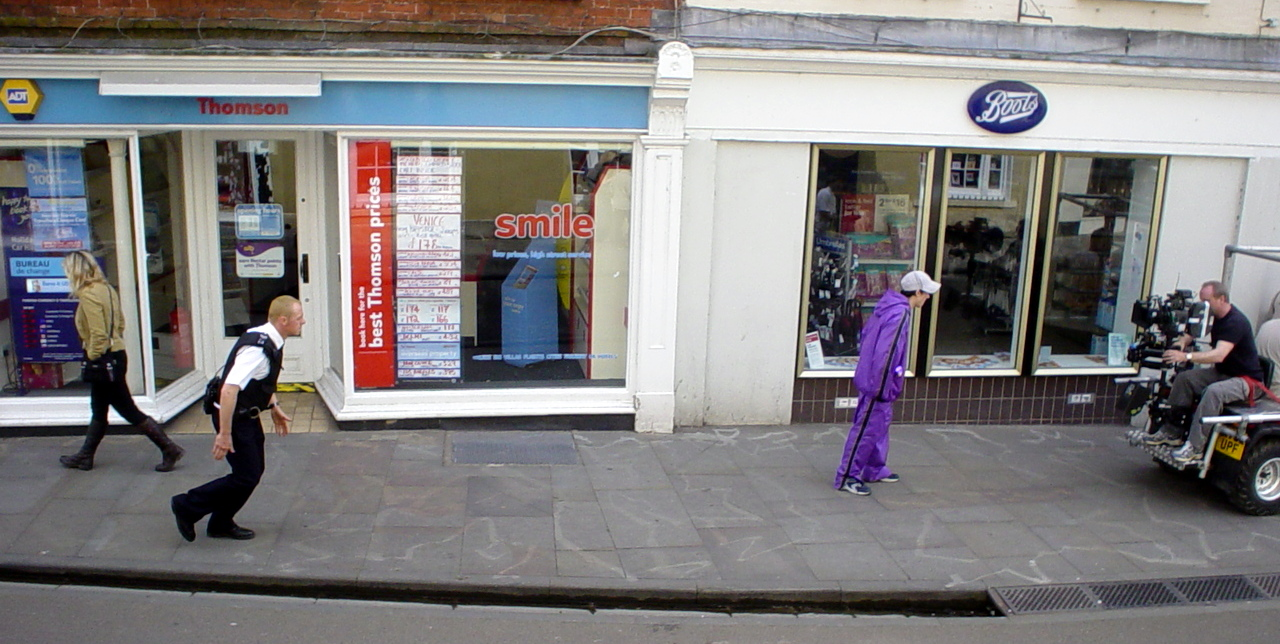
Pegg filming in Wells, Somerset

During the latter half of 2005, Working Title Films approached several towns in South West England looking for an appropriate filming location. Pegg commented, "We're both [Pegg and Wright] from the West Country so it just seemed like it was the perfect and logical thing to drag those kind of ideas and those genres and those clichés back to our beginnings to where we grew up, so you could see high-octane balls-to-the-wall action in Frome". Stow-on-the-Wold was considered amongst others, but after being turned away, the company settled upon Wells in Somerset, Wright's hometown, of which he has said "I love it but I also want to trash it". Wells Cathedral was digitally painted out of every shot of the cathedral city, as Wright wanted the Church of St Cuthbert to be the centre building for the fictional town of Sandford; however, the Bishop's Palace is identifiable in some shots (and was itself used as the setting for some scenes). While shooting scenes in their uniforms, Pegg and Frost were often mistaken for genuine police officers and asked for directions by passers-by. Filming also took place at the Hendon Police College, including the driving school skid pan and athletic track and at the Metropolitan Police Specialist Training Centre at Gravesend. Next to Hendon is Mill Hill where Finchley Nurseries is located which is where the flower shop scene was filmed. The final scenes were filmed at the surviving ruins of Waverley Abbey. Filming commenced on 19 March 2006 and lasted for eleven weeks. Wright cut half an hour of footage in editing.

=== Outside references ===
==== Self-references ====
Wright has said that Hot Fuzz takes elements from his final amateur film, Dead Right, which he described as both "Lethal Weapon set in Somerset" and "a Dirty Harry film in Somerset". He uses some of the same locations in both films, including the Somerfield supermarket, where he used to work as a shelf-stacker.

Hot Fuzz contains references to Shaun of the Dead. In one scene, Angel wants to chase a shoplifter by jumping over several garden fences; however, Danny is reluctant. Angel says, "What's the matter, Danny? You never taken a shortcut before?" He smiles assuredly before jumping over four in a row (according to the DVD commentary, Pegg vaulted over three fences, and a stunt man did a back flip over the fourth). When Danny attempts it, he trips and falls through the first fence and climbs over the second. This is almost identical to a scene in Shaun of the Dead, including the fall-through-fence gag, albeit with the pratfalling role reverse: in Shaun of the Dead it happens to Pegg's character rather than Frost's, and he falls over the fence rather than through it. The DVD commentary says that Frost purposely looked back at the camera after crashing through the fence, to show that he had done the stunt rather than someone else.

Frost's characters (Danny in Hot Fuzz, Ed in Shaun of the Dead) have a liking for Cornetto ice cream. Pegg and Wright have referred to Hot Fuzz as being the second film in the "Three Flavours Cornetto trilogy", with Shaun of the Dead being the first and The World's End being the third.

==== Other films ====
Various scenes in Hot Fuzz feature a variety of action film DVDs such as Supercop and scenes from Point Break and Bad Boys II. Wright had to get permission from every actor in each video clip, including stunt men, to use the clips and for the use of the DVD covers had to pay for the rights from the studios. Hot Fuzz parodies clichés used in other action movies. On the topic of perceived gun fetishes in these movies, Pegg has said, "Men can't do that thing, which is the greatest achievement of humankind, which is to make another human, so we make metal versions of our own penises and fire more bits of metal out of the end into people's heads... It's our turn to grab the gun by the hilt and fire it into your face." Despite this, Pegg maintained that Hot Fuzz was not a spoof, in that they aspired towards action films rather than sneered at them. Hot Fuzz also includes references to The Wicker Man, in which Edward Woodward had played a policeman tough on law and order.

=== Special effects ===
To illustrate the destruction of the mansion as a result of the gas explosion, gas mortars were placed in front of the building to create large-scale fireballs. The wave of fire engulfs the camera, and to achieve that effect, gas mortars were used again but were fired upwards into a black ceiling piece that sloped up towards the camera. When the sequence was shot at a high speed, the flames appeared to surge across the ground. For one of the final scenes, the Sandford police station is destroyed by an explosion. Part of the explosion was created by using a set model that showed its windows being blown out, while the building remained intact. The actual destruction of the building was depicted by exploding a miniature model of the station.

Visual effects supervisor Richard Briscoe revealed the rationale for using the large amounts of blood: "In many ways, the more extreme you make it, the more people know it is stylised and enjoy the humour inherent in how ridiculous it is. It's rather like the (eventually) limbless Black Knight in Monty Python and the Holy Grail." The most time-consuming gore sequence involved a character's head being crushed by a section of a church. A dummy was used against a green screen and the head was detonated at the point when the object was about to impact the body. More than seventy gunfight shots were digitally augmented; Briscoe's said: "The town square shootout, for example, is full of extra little hits scattered throughout, so that it feels like our hero characters really do have it all going off, all around them. It was a great demonstration of [how] seemingly very trivial enhancements can make a difference when combined across a sequence."

== Promotion ==
The first two teaser trailers were released on 16 October 2006. Wright, Pegg, and Frost maintained several video blogs, which were released at various times throughout the production. Wright and Frost held a panel at the 2006 San Diego Comic-Con to promote Hot Fuzz, which included preliminary footage and a question and answer session. The two returned to the convention again in 2007 to promote the US DVD release. The world premiere was on 13 February 2007 in Leicester Square. The premiere included escorts from motorcycle police officers and the use of blue carpet instead of the traditional red carpet.

== Release ==
=== Critical reception ===
The review aggregator website Rotten Tomatoes reported a 91% approval rating with an average rating of 7.7/10 based on 204 reviews. The website's consensus reads, "The brilliant minds behind Shaun of the Dead successfully take a shot at the buddy cop genre with Hot Fuzz. The result is a bitingly satiric and hugely entertaining parody." It has a Metacritic score of 81 out of 100, based on 37 critics, indicating "universal acclaim". Olly Richards of Empire praised the chemistry between Pegg and Frost, saying: "After almost a decade together, they're clearly so comfortable in each other's presence that they feel no need to fight for the punchline, making them terrific company for two hours".

Philip French of The Observer, who did not care for Shaun of the Dead, warmed to the comedy team for Hot Fuzz. It also received positive reviews in the United States. Derek Elley of Variety praised Broadbent and Dalton as "especially good as Angel's hail-fellow-well-met superior and oily No. 1 suspect". As an homage to the genre, Hot Fuzz was well received by the screenwriter Shane Black. Despite being mostly praised, not all reviews were positive. The Daily Mirror gave Hot Fuzz two out of five, writing that "many of the jokes miss their target" as it becomes more action-based. Anthony Quinn of The Independent said, "The same impish spirit [as in Spaced] is uncorked here, but it has been fatally indulged."

In 2016, Empire ranked Hot Fuzz 50th on their list of the 100 best British films, writing: "The second in their planned trilogy again nails the genre clichés, with everything from Point Break to Bad Boys II (both openly referenced) humorously homaged. Pegg's natural chemistry with long-time real-life pal Frost remains endearing as ever. Elsewhere, the Scooby-Doo-meets-Scream mystery is peppered with Britain's finest talent, playing up the English small-town clichés to great effect in a brilliantly incongruous meeting of sleepy rural life and stabby violent action." In 2025, Hot Fuzz was voted the 108th-best film of the 21st century by New York Times readers.

=== Accolades ===
Award	Category	Recipient	Result
Empire Awards	Best Comedy	Hot Fuzz	Won
Empire Awards	Best British Film	Hot Fuzz	Nominated
Empire Awards	Best Actor	Simon Pegg	Nominated
Empire Awards	Best Director	Edgar Wright	Nominated

=== Box office ===
Hot Fuzz generated £7.1 million in its first weekend of release in the United Kingdom on 14 February 2007. In 20 April US opening weekend, it grossed $5.8 million from only 825 cinemas, making it the highest per-cinema average of any film in the top ten that week. Its opening weekend take beat the $3.3 million opening weekend gross of Pegg and Wright's previous film, Shaun of the Dead. In its second weekend of release, Rogue Pictures expanded the cinema count from 825 to 1,272 and it grossed $4.9 million, representing a 17% dip in the gross. Altogether, Hot Fuzz grossed $80,573,774 worldwide. In nine weeks, Hot Fuzz earned nearly twice what Shaun of the Dead made in the US, and more than three times its gross in other countries.

=== Home media ===
The DVD was released on 11 June 2007 in the UK. More than one million DVDs were sold in the UK in the first four weeks of its release. The two-disc set contains the feature film with commentaries, outtakes, storyboards, deleted scenes, a making-of documentary, video blogs, featurettes, galleries, and some hidden easter eggs. The DVD also features Wright's last amateur film, Dead Right, which he described as "Hot Fuzz without the budget". Hot Fuzz appeared on region 2 DVD earlier than the theatrical release date in Germany, which was on 14 June 2007. In the commentary with director Wright and fellow filmmaker Quentin Tarantino, they discuss nearly 200 films.

The US DVD and HD DVD release was on 31 July 2007. It opened at No. 2 at the American DVD sales chart, selling 853,000 units for more than $14m in revenue. 1,923,000 units have been sold, acquiring revenue of $33.3 million. The HD DVD edition has more special features than the standard DVD release. A three-disc collector's edition was released on 27 November 2007 and a Blu-ray edition on 22 September 2009.

== Soundtrack ==
The soundtrack album, Hot Fuzz: Music from the Motion Picture, was released on 19 February 2007 in the United Kingdom, and on 17 April 2007 in the United States and Canada. The UK release contains 22 tracks, and the North American release has 14. The score is by the English film composer David Arnold, who scored the James Bond film series from 1997 to 2008. The soundtrack album's "Hot Fuzz Suite" is a compilation of excerpts from Arnold's score. According to the DVD commentary, the scenes where Nicholas Angel is at a convenience store, while leaving Sandford, and his return to the police station while arming for the final shootout (found in the track "Avenging Angel"), were scored by Robert Rodriguez, who did not see the rest of the film while writing the music.

Other music is a mix of 1960s and 1970s British rock (the Kinks, T. Rex, the Move, Sweet, the Troggs, the Crazy World of Arthur Brown, Cozy Powell, Dire Straits), new wave (Adam Ant, XTC) and a Glaswegian indie band (the Fratellis). The soundtrack album features dialogue extracts by Pegg, Frost, and other cast members, mostly embedded in the music tracks. The song selection also includes some police-themed titles, including Supergrass' "Caught by the Fuzz" as well as "Here Come the Fuzz", which was specially composed by the Jon Spencer Blues Explosion.

== See also ==
- List of British films of 2007
