= Edgar Wright =

English filmmaker (born 1974)

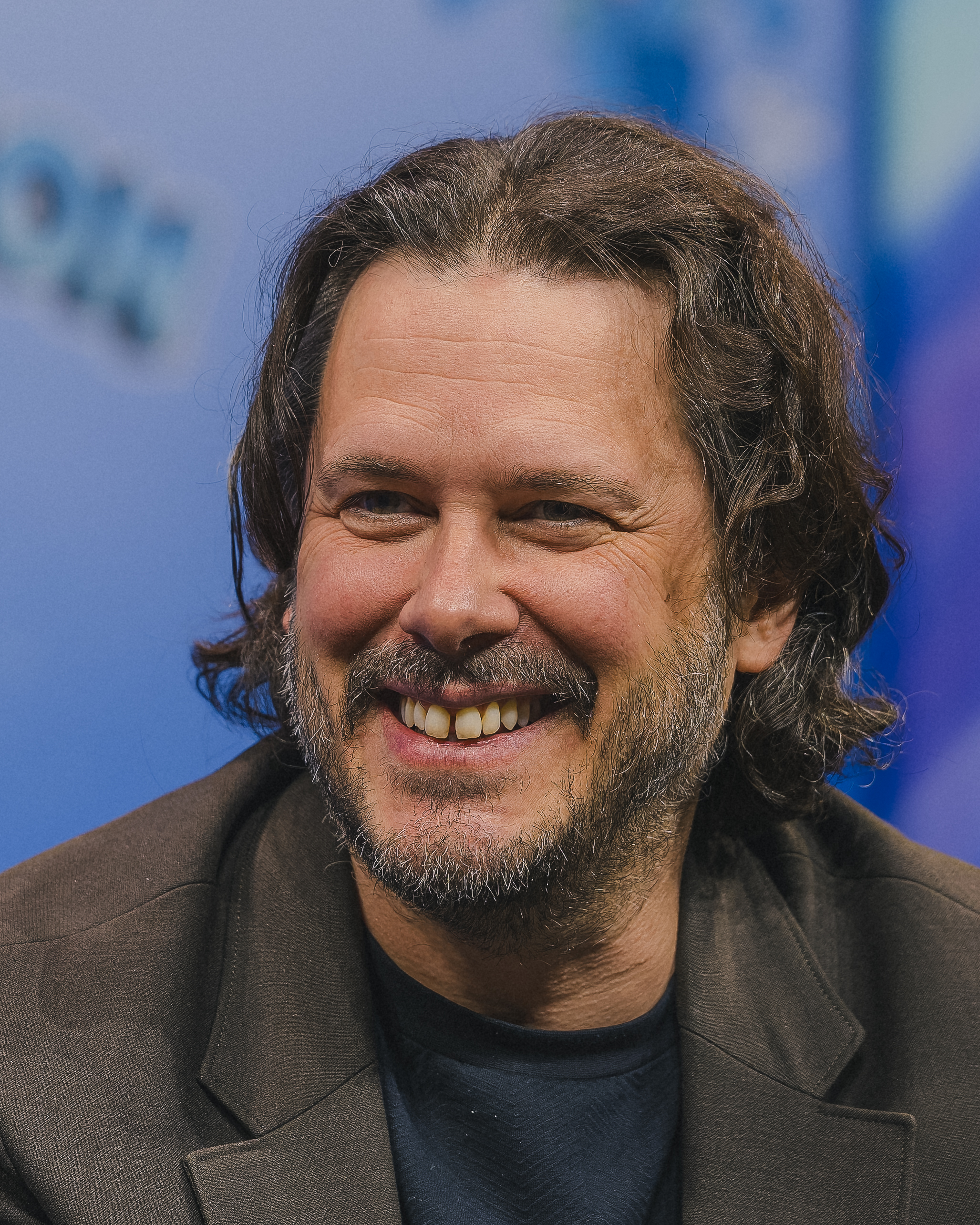
- Wright in 2026
- Born: Edgar Howard Wright; 18 April 1974 (age 52); Poole, Dorset, England
- Education: Bournemouth and Poole College of Art and Design
- Occupations: Film director; film producer; screenwriter
- Years active: 1988–present

Edgar Howard Wright (born 18 April 1974) is an English filmmaker. He is known for his fast-paced and kinetic, satirical genre films, which feature extensive use of expressive popular music, Steadicam tracking shots, dolly zooms and a signature editing style that includes transitions, whip pans and wipes. He first made independent short films before making his first feature film A Fistful of Fingers in 1995. Wright created and directed the comedy series Asylum in 1996, written with David Walliams. After directing several other television shows, Wright directed the sitcom Spaced (1999–2001), which aired for two series and starred frequent collaborators Simon Pegg and Nick Frost.

In 2004, Wright directed the zombie comedy Shaun of the Dead, starring Pegg and Frost, the first film in Wright's Three Flavours Cornetto trilogy. The film was co-written with Pegg—as were the next two entries in the trilogy, the buddy cop film Hot Fuzz (2007) and the science fiction comedy The World's End (2013). In 2010, Wright co-wrote and directed the action comedy film Scott Pilgrim vs. the World, an adaptation of the graphic novel series. Along with Joe Cornish and Steven Moffat, he adapted The Adventures of Tintin (2011) for Steven Spielberg. Wright and Cornish co-wrote the screenplay for the Marvel Cinematic Universe film Ant-Man in 2015, which Wright intended to direct but abandoned, citing creative differences. He has also written and directed the action films Baby Driver (2017) and The Running Man (2025), the documentary The Sparks Brothers, and the psychological horror film Last Night in Soho (both 2021).

== Early life and education ==
Edgar Howard Wright was born on 18 April 1974 in Poole, Dorset and grew up predominantly in Wells in Somerset. He has an older brother, Oscar, who is an artist. He attended The Blue School, Wells from 1985 to 1992, and is honoured by a plaque at the school. His school drama teacher, Peter Wild, later played a cameo role in Hot Fuzz.

Throughout the late 1980s and early 1990s, he directed many short films, first on a Super-8 camera that was a gift from a family member and later on a Video-8 camcorder that he won in a competition on the television-programme Going Live!. These films were mostly comedic pastiches of popular genres, such as the super hero-inspired Carbolic Soap and Dirty Harry tribute Dead Right (which was featured on the DVD release of Hot Fuzz).

From 1992 to 1994, Wright attended the Bournemouth and Poole College of Art and Design (now Arts University Bournemouth) and received an ND in Audio-Visual Design.

In June 2018, Arts University Bournemouth awarded Wright an Honorary Fellowship. On receiving the award Wright said that he still thought very fondly of his time there.

== Career ==
=== 1995–2002: Early works and Spaced ===
Wright made his feature film debut in 1995 with a low budget, independent spoof western, A Fistful of Fingers, which was picked up for a limited theatrical release and broadcast on the satellite TV channel Sky Movies. Despite Wright's dissatisfaction with the finished product, it caught the attention of comedians Matt Lucas and David Walliams, who subsequently chose him as the director of their Paramount Comedy channel production Mash and Peas. During this time he also worked on BBC-programmes such as Is It Bill Bailey?, Alexei Sayle's Merry-Go-Round and Sir Bernard's Stately Homes. In an interview with journalist and author Robert K. Elder for The Film That Changed My Life, Wright attributes his edgy and comedic style to his love for An American Werewolf in London.

I've always been fascinated by horror films and genre films. And horror films harboured a fascination for me and always have been something I've wanted to watch and wanted to make. Equally, I'm very fascinated by comedy. I suppose the reason that this film changed my life is that very early on in my film-watching experiences, I saw a film that was so sophisticated in its tone and what it managed to achieve.

In 1998 writer/actors Simon Pegg and Jessica Hynes were in the early stages of developing their sitcom Spaced for Channel 4 and thought of asking Wright to direct, having fondly remembered working with him on the 1996 Paramount comedy Asylum. Wright gave Spaced an unusual look for the sitcom genre, with dramatic camera angles and movement borrowed from the visual language of science fiction and horror films. Instead of shying away from these influences Wright makes an active effort to show his referencing, adding a 'Homage-O-Meter' to all of his releases, a device that displays each directorial nod he has made during shooting. In 2002, he made appearances as a scientist and a technician named Eddie Yorque during both series of Look Around You, a BBC programme created by a member of the Spaced cast, Peter Serafinowicz. He also made two brief appearances in Spaced, one in which he can be seen, along with other crew members on the series, lying asleep in Daisy Steiner's squat as she prepares to leave for her new house. The other is a brief appearance during the montage in the episode "Gone" where Daisy describes to Tim what she thinks would be a fun night out for the two. Edgar is sitting on the tube (with a beard) next to Tim and Daisy.

=== 2003–2013: The Three Flavours Cornetto trilogy and Scott Pilgrim ===
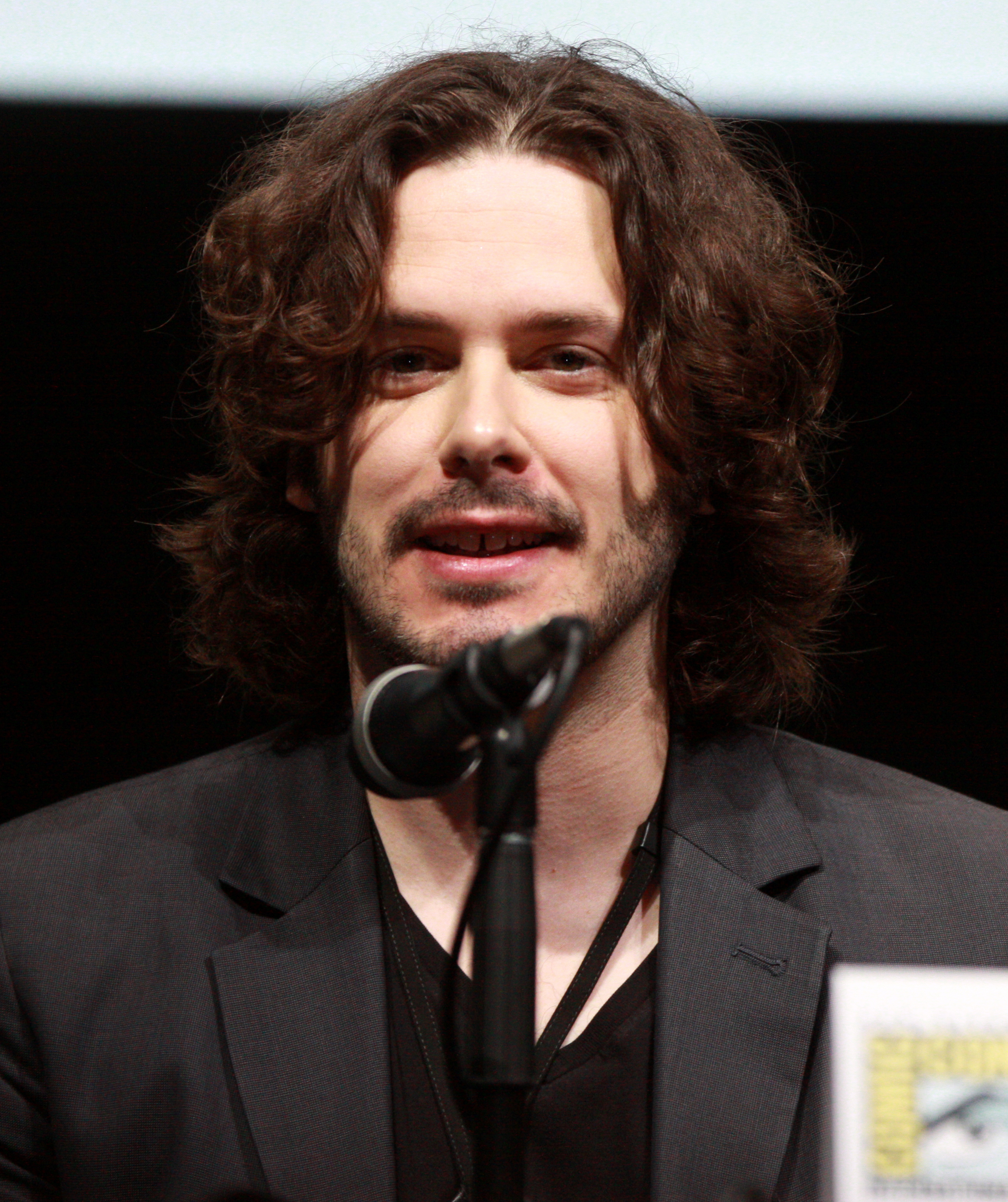
Wright in 2013

The critical success of Spaced paved the way for Wright and Pegg to move to the big screen with Shaun of the Dead, a zombie comedy which mixed a "Brit flick" romantic comedy style with homages to the horror classics of George A. Romero and Sam Raimi. The film was a success critically and financially, and its rooting in American genre cinema helped to make it an international hit.

The pair planned a trilogy of British genre comedies which were connected not by narrative but by their shared traits and motifs. The trilogy was named "The Three-Flavours-Cornetto-Trilogy" by the pair due to a running joke about the British ice cream product Cornetto and its effectiveness as a hangover cure. Wright explained to Clark Collis in an interview for Entertainment Weekly, "We put that joke in Shaun of the Dead where Nick asks for a Cornetto first thing in the morning. When I was at college, it was my hangover cure—probably still is my hangover cure. Then we put it into Hot Fuzz because we thought it would be a funny recurring thing. One journalist in the United Kingdom said, 'Is this going to be your theme as a trilogy?' and I said, 'Yes, it's like Krzysztof Kieślowski's Three Colours trilogy. This is the Three Flavours Cornetto trilogy.' It was just a joke that stuck." Collis observes that the films also feature "a running gag involving garden fences."

The second installment was the comedy action thriller Hot Fuzz. Production started in March 2006 and the film was released in February 2007 in the United Kingdom and April 2007 in the United States. It revolves around Pegg's character, Nicholas Angel, a police officer who is transferred from London to rural Sandford, where grisly events soon take place. In 2007, Wright also directed a fake trailer insert for Quentin Tarantino and Robert Rodriguez's Grindhouse, called "Don't". It was a plotless trailer that mocked horror clichés, with lines such as, "If you... are thinking... of going ... into... this... house... DON'T!".

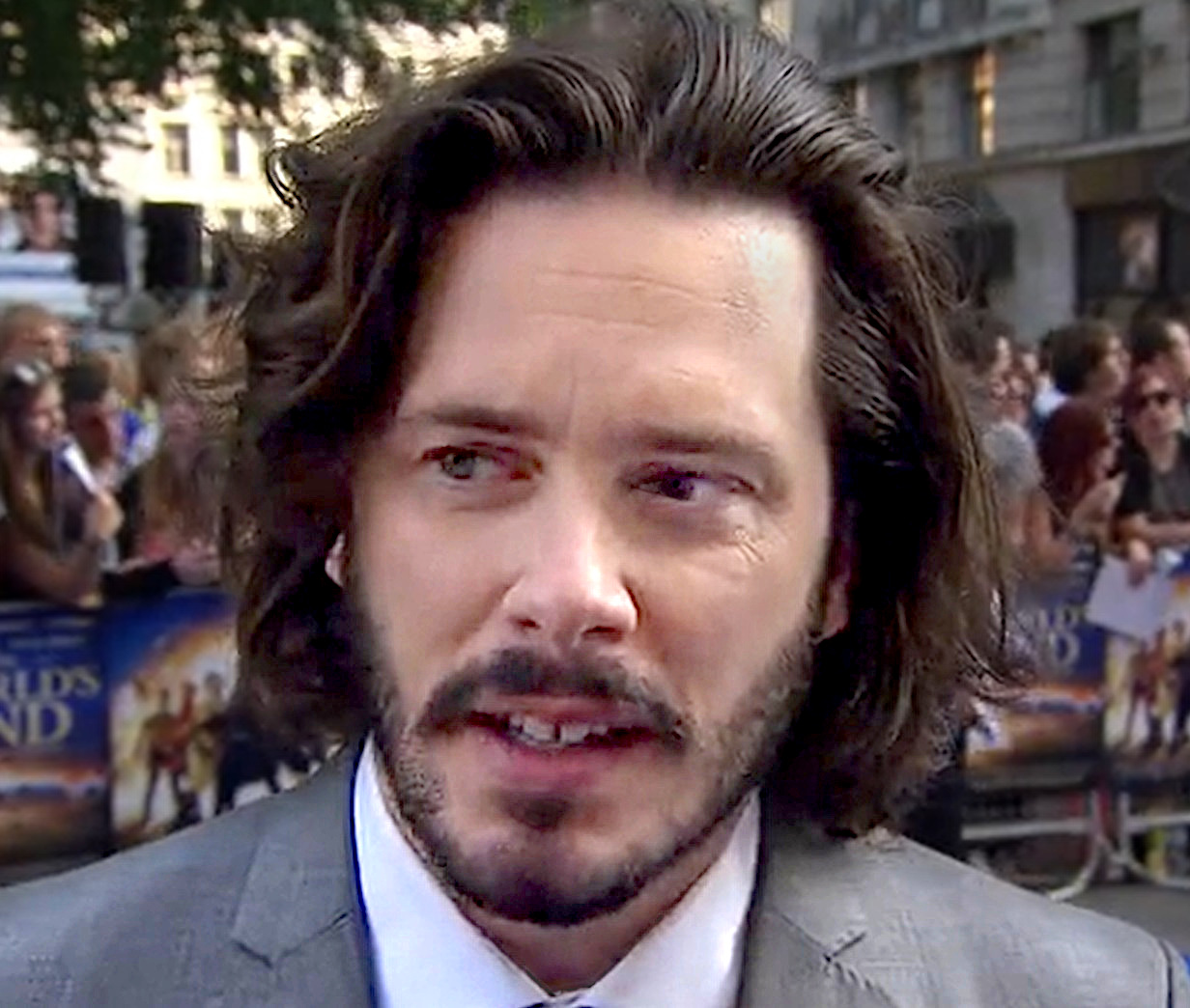
Wright at The World's End premiere, Leicester Square, 2013

In 2010, Scott Pilgrim vs. the World was released; its over-$85 million budget dwarfed the £8 million budget of Hot Fuzz. The film, based on the graphic novel series Scott Pilgrim, was co-written, co-produced and directed by Wright. It took in roughly half its budget in box office, in spite of its critical reception and praise from fellow directors such as Kevin Smith, Quentin Tarantino and Jason Reitman. In November 2011, The Adventures of Tintin, directed by Steven Spielberg, produced by Peter Jackson, and based on Hergé's The Adventures of Tintin was released. Wright co-wrote the film with writing partner Joe Cornish and Steven Moffat. The film also co-starred Wright's frequent collaborators Simon Pegg and Nick Frost. The third installment of the Cornetto trilogy, The World's End, premiered in London on 10 July 2013. The film is about several friends who reunite when one decides to repeat a pub crawl they did 20 years earlier. They have to get to The World's End pub without ending up in the gutter to do this, but some unusual powers are at work and what happens to them may determine what happens to humans as a species.

=== 2014–2017: Baby Driver and The Sparks Brothers ===
In July 2014, Wright announced that his next film would be Baby Driver. Wright has described the film as "kind of like a musical", and Deadline Hollywood described it as "a collision of crime, action, music, and sound". The film stars Ansel Elgort, Kevin Spacey, Lily James, Eiza González, Jon Hamm, and Jamie Foxx. The film began production on 11 February 2016 in Atlanta, and was released on 28 June 2017.

In June 2018, Edgar announced he would be making a documentary on the cult pop rock band Sparks. He had covered the band's concert in London in May at the O2 Forum Kentish Town. This concert would be included in the documentary. The film had its world premiere at the 2021 Sundance Film Festival on 30 January 2021 and was theatrically released in North America on 18 June 2021, by Focus Features.

=== 2019–2025: Last Night in Soho and The Running Man ===
In January 2019, it was announced that his next film will be a horror thriller film set in London and inspired by films such as Don't Look Now and Repulsion. In February 2019, it was revealed that the title was Last Night in Soho, with Anya Taylor-Joy attached to star. In February, Matt Smith and Thomasin McKenzie joined the cast. Other confirmed crew members include co-screenwriter Krysty Wilson-Cairns, editor Paul Machliss (who edited four episodes of Spaced in 2001 and all of Wright's films since Scott Pilgrim vs. the World) and Baby Driver production designer Marcus Rowland. The film was scheduled to be released on 25 September 2020 but was pushed back to 29 October 2021 owing to the COVID-19 pandemic.

In 2020 it was announced that Wright had formed a production company with his longtime collaborators Nira Park, Joe Cornish and Rachel Prior, Complete Fiction. That same day, it was reported that the production company had signed a deal with Netflix to tackle adaptations of Lockwood & Co., The Murders of Molly Southbourne, and The City of Brass. The production company is also set to produce another Netflix original series, albeit one that is under wraps and has several feature films in development with Working Title Films.

In April 2022 Wright was appointed to the British Film Institute's Board of Governors for a four-year term, saying he was "excited to see what I can do to help promote their incredible efforts in curating, preserving, producing and educating". In 2023, Wright announced via Twitter that Scott Pilgrim would be returning as an anime adaptation with the film's original actors as the voice cast. Scott Pilgrim Takes Off was released on 17 November 2023 for Netflix, with Wright as an executive producer.

In February 2021, Wright signed on to direct Paramount Pictures' new film adaptation of Stephen King's The Running Man, which would also be a remake of the 1987 film version, starring Josh Brolin and Glen Powell. Wright and Michael Bacall planned to re-imagine the story for a new audience, with Bacall writing the screenplay.

== Influences ==
Wright stated in The Film That Changed My Life that the film that most influenced him was John Landis's An American Werewolf in London. He also mentioned Sam Raimi's Evil Dead II and the Coen brothers' Raising Arizona as films that made him want to be a director.

=== Favourite films ===
Wright participated in the 2022 Sight and Sound Directors' Poll, which is held once every ten years for contemporary filmmakers to select their ten favourite films in no particular order. His selections were: 2001: A Space Odyssey (1968), The Good, the Bad and the Ugly (1966), Psycho (1960), Singin' in the Rain (1951), Don't Look Now (1973), Taxi Driver (1976), Madame de... (1953), An American Werewolf in London (1981), Raising Arizona (1987), and Mad Max: Fury Road (2015).

== Personal life ==
Wright was in a relationship with musician Charlotte Hatherley from 2002. He directed music videos for her songs "Bastardo" and "Summer". Hatherley's mother, actress Patricia Franklin, also appeared in all three films of the Three Flavours Cornetto trilogy.

From 2008 to 2013, Wright dated American actress Anna Kendrick, whom he met while filming Scott Pilgrim vs. the World.

As of 2026, Wright is in a relationship with musician Julia Cumming from the band Sunflower Bean of which he was a fan. She made a cameo appearance in The Running Man, and in January 2026 Wright directed the music video for "My Life", the first single of Cumming's debut solo album Julia, as well as Wright's first music video in eight years.

In December 2007, Wright began guest programming at Repertory theatre the New Beverly Cinema following a sold-out screening of his films. He curated a two-week series of his favourite films dubbed "The Wright Stuff", hosting interviews with filmmakers and performers for each screening. The festival concluded with a double-bill of Evil Dead II and Raising Arizona. Wright returned for additional "The Wright Stuff" events in January 2011 and December 2011, the third series consisting of films that had been recommended to Wright by friends Bill Hader, Daniel Waters, Quentin Tarantino, Judd Apatow, Joss Whedon, John Landis and Joe Dante, but that he had never seen. Wright's attempt to narrow the list based on public comment from visitors to his blog "produced another thousand suggestions." In August 2013, Wright programmed an additional double-feature series at the theatre, "The World's End is Nigh", consisting of 12 movies that he called "stepping stones to our new movie" The World's End.

Wright has made cameos in every film by his friend Garth Jennings. Jennings made cameos in Shaun of the Dead, Hot Fuzz and The World's End.

== Filmography ==
=== Film ===
Year	Title	Director	Writer	Producer	Notes
1992	Carbolic Soap	Yes	Yes	No	Amateur film
1995	A Fistful of Fingers	Yes	Yes	Yes	
2004	Shaun of the Dead	Yes	Yes	No	Co-written with Simon Pegg
2007	Hot Fuzz	Yes	Yes	No	Co-written with Simon Pegg
2010	Scott Pilgrim vs. the World	Yes	Yes	Yes	Co-written with Michael Bacall
2011	The Adventures of Tintin	No	Yes	No	Co-written with Steven Moffat and Joe Cornish
2013	The World's End	Yes	Yes	Executive	Co-written with Simon Pegg
2015	Ant-Man	No	Yes	Executive	Story and original screenplay co-written with Joe Cornish
2017	Baby Driver	Yes	Yes	Executive	
2021	The Sparks Brothers	Yes	No	Yes	Documentary film
2021	Last Night in Soho	Yes	Yes	Yes	Co-written with Krysty Wilson-Cairns
2025	The Running Man	Yes	Yes	Yes	Co-written with Michael Bacall

Executive producer only

- Attack the Block (2011)
- Sightseers (2012)

Acting roles

Year	Title	Role	Notes
1995	A Fistful of Fingers	Cheesy voiceover artist and two-bit farmer	
2004	Shaun of the Dead	Rabid Monkeys Newsreader, Prat-falling Zombie, Italian Restaurant Voice, Noel's Friend on phone	Uncredited
2005	Land of the Dead	Photo Booth Zombie	
2005	The Hitchhiker's Guide to the Galaxy	Deep Thought Technician	Uncredited
2007	Hot Fuzz	Shelf Stacker and Dave	Uncredited Voices
2007	Son of Rambow	Metal Work Teacher	
2013	The World's End	Construction Worker	Uncredited Voice
2016	Sing	Goat	Voice
2017	Baby Driver	Background Passerby	Uncredited
2017	Star Wars: The Last Jedi	Resistance Soldier	Uncredited
2021	The Sparks Brothers	Himself	Documentary
2021	Sing 2	Dog Cop and a Pig Chauffeur	Voice

=== Short film ===
Year	Title	Credited as			Notes
Year	Title	Director	Writer	Producer	Notes
1988	I Want to Get into the Movies	Yes	Yes	Yes	
1988	The Unparkables	Yes	Yes	Yes	
1988	Rolf Harris Saves the World	Yes	Yes	Yes	
1993	Dead Right	Yes	Yes	Yes	
2004	Forced Hilarity	Yes	Yes	Yes	
2007	Don't	Yes	Yes	No	Fake trailer from Grindhouse

Acting roles

Year	Title	Role	Notes
1988	Rolf Harris Saves the World	Rolf Harris	Voice
1993	Dead Right	The Director	
2001	Calcium	Scientist	

=== Television ===
Year	Title	Director	Writer	Notes
1996	Asylum	Yes	Yes	6 episodes
1996–1997	Mash and Peas	Yes	No	9 episodes
1998	Alexei Sayle's Merry-Go-Round	Yes	Yes	6 episodes
1998	Is It Bill Bailey?	Yes	No	6 episodes
1998	French and Saunders	Yes	No	Episode: "Titanic"
1999	Sir Bernard's Stately Homes	Yes	No	6 episodes
1999	Murder Most Horrid	Yes	No	Episode: "Confessions of a Murderer"
1999–2001	Spaced	Yes	No	14 episodes

Executive producer

- Scott Pilgrim Takes Off (2023)

Acting roles

Year	Title	Role	Notes
1999–2001	Spaced	First Sleeping Ex-flatmate, Man on Tube Next to Daisy, Sounds of Despair tape	Uncredited; 3 episodes
2002–2005	Look Around You	Scientist, Eddie Yorque, Floor manager, Technician	7 episodes
2017	Tour de Pharmacy	Commentator	TV movie
2019	DuckTales	Alistair Boorswan (voice)	Episode: "The Duck Knight Returns!"

=== Music video ===
Year	Title	Artist
2000	"Keep the Home Fires Burning"	The Bluetones
2002	"After Hours"	The Bluetones
2003	"Psychosis Safari"	The Eighties Matchbox B-Line Disaster
2003	"Blue Song"	Mint Royale
2004	"Summer"	Charlotte Hatherley
2005	"Bastardo"	Charlotte Hatherley
2014	"Gust of Wind"	Pharrell Williams featuring Daft Punk
2018	"Colors"	Beck
2026	"My Life"	Julia Cumming

=== Video game ===
Year	Title	Role	Notes
2019	Death Stranding	Thomas Southerland	Likeness only

=== Advertisements ===
Year	Title	Brand
2018	Choose Go	Nike
2022	Everything to Shell Anything	Squarespace
2023	Fancy a McDonald's?	McDonald's
2026	Market Mayhem	Apple

== Awards and nominations ==
Year	Award	Category	Title	Result
2000	BAFTA Awards	Situation Comedy Award	Spaced	Nominated
2002	BAFTA Awards	Situation Comedy Award	Spaced	Nominated
2004	British Independent Film Awards	Best Screenplay	Shaun of the Dead	Won
2004	Bram Stoker Awards	Screenplay	Shaun of the Dead	Won
2005	BAFTA Awards	Alexander Korda Award for Best British Film	Shaun of the Dead	Nominated
2005	Empire Awards	Best British Director	Shaun of the Dead	Nominated
2005	ALFS Awards	Best Screenwriter of the Year	Shaun of the Dead	Nominated
2005	Online Film Critics Society Awards	Best Breakthrough Filmmaker	Shaun of the Dead	Nominated
2005	Online Film Critics Society Awards	Best Original Screenplay	Shaun of the Dead	Nominated
2008	Empire Awards	Best Director	Hot Fuzz	Nominated
2010	SDFCS Award	Best Adapted Screenplay	Scott Pilgrim vs. the World	Nominated
2010	Satellite Awards	Best Adapted Screenplay	Scott Pilgrim vs. the World	Nominated
2011	Empire Awards	Best Director	Scott Pilgrim vs. the World	Won
2011	Empire Awards	Inspiration Award		Won
2011	Hugo Awards	Best Dramatic Presentation	Scott Pilgrim vs. the World	Nominated
2011	Online Film Critics Society	Best Adapted Screenplay	Scott Pilgrim vs. the World	Nominated
2011	Science Fiction and Fantasy Writers of America	Bradbury Award	Scott Pilgrim vs. the World	Nominated
2011	Satellite Awards	Best Adapted Screenplay	The Adventures of Tintin	Nominated
2012	Annie Awards	Writing in a Feature Production	The Adventures of Tintin	Nominated
2014	Saturn Awards	Best Writing	The World's End	Nominated
2014	Empire Awards	Best Director	The World's End	Nominated
2018	Empire Awards	Best Director	Baby Driver	Nominated
2018	Georgia Film Critics Association	Best Director	Baby Driver	Nominated
2018	Georgia Film Critics Association	Oglethorpe Award for Excellence in Georgia Cinema	Baby Driver	Won

== See also ==
- Edgar Wright's unrealized projects
