= The World's End (film) =

2013 action comedy film by Edgar Wright

- UK theatrical release poster
- Directed by: Edgar Wright
- Written by: Simon Pegg; Edgar Wright
- Produced by: Nira Park; Tim Bevan; Eric Fellner
- Starring: Simon Pegg; Nick Frost; Paddy Considine; Martin Freeman; Eddie Marsan; Rosamund Pike; Pierce Brosnan
- Cinematography: Bill Pope
- Edited by: Paul Machliss
- Music by: Steven Price
- Production companies: Relativity Media; Working Title Films; Big Talk Pictures; Dentsu
- Distributed by: Focus Features (North America); Universal Pictures (International)
- Release dates: 10 July 2013 (Leicester Square); 19 July 2013 (United Kingdom); 23 August 2013 (United States)
- Running time: 109 minutes
- Countries: United Kingdom; United States; Japan
- Language: English
- Budget: $20 million
- Box office: $46.1 million

The World's End is a 2013 science fiction comedy film directed by Edgar Wright and written by Wright and Simon Pegg. It is the third and final film in the Three Flavours Cornetto trilogy, after Shaun of the Dead (2004) and Hot Fuzz (2007). Starring Pegg, Nick Frost, Paddy Considine, Martin Freeman, Eddie Marsan, Rosamund Pike and Pierce Brosnan, the film focuses on five friends who return to their hometown for a pub crawl and uncover an alien invasion.

In 1995, Wright wrote a screenplay titled Crawl about teenagers on a pub crawl. Deciding it was better suited as a comedic exploration of young adulthood and ageing, he reworked the screenplay with Pegg in the early 2010s. The film was produced by Relativity Media, Big Talk Productions and Working Title Films. Principal photography began on 28 September 2012 and lasted until that December, with filming locations including Elstree Studios, Letchworth Garden City, and Welwyn Garden City. The stunts were coordinated by members of Jackie Chan Stunt Team, and The World's End is considered a social science fiction film.

The World's End premiered at Leicester Square in London on 10 July 2013, and was theatrically released in the United Kingdom by Universal Pictures on 19 July. Its release in the United States by Focus Features followed on 23 August. The film received positive reviews, with praise for the screenplay, performances of the cast, humour and direction. It won Best British Film at the 19th Empire Awards, and was nominated for Best Comedy at the 19th Critics' Choice Awards. The World's End grossed $46.1 million worldwide on a budget of $20 million.

== Plot ==
Gary King, an immature 40-year-old alcoholic, decides to recapture his youth by inviting boyhood friends Oliver Chamberlain, Peter Page, Steven Prince, and Andrew Knightley to complete the "Golden Mile", a pub crawl encompassing 12 pubs in their hometown of Newton Haven. The group attempted the crawl as teens in 1990, but did not reach the final pub, The World's End. Andy is now a teetotaller due to a 1997 drunk driving accident while taking Gary to the hospital after the latter suffered a drug overdose. He reluctantly agrees to join after Gary lies about his mother dying.

The group encounters Oliver's sister, Sam, who Gary and Steven fought over in school. In the fourth pub, after getting told by the others that he needs to 'grow up', an angry Gary goes to the toilet and gets into a fight with a teenager. He knocks his head off, exposing him as an android. Gary's friends encounter several other androids and fight them off. They realise androids, which they dub "Blanks", have taken over the town.

Gary urges continuing the pub crawl to avoid suspicion. They bump into Sam once more, and she, Gary, and Steven fight Blank versions of Sam's childhood friends, known as the "twins". Sam tags along, and Steven is told by Basil, a local conspiracy theorist who has not yet been replaced by a Blank, that the Blanks are trying to build a galactic conglomerate, and that any humans refusing will be replaced with identical Blanks. The Blanks attempt to convince the humans to surrender. Unwilling to lose their humanity and, finding out that both Oliver and their old school teacher, Mr. Shepherd, have been replaced, the group fights a bar full of Blanks.

Gary lets Sam escape Newton Haven; Pete is captured after attacking the Blank that has replaced his childhood bully; and, when Andy and Steven try to escape, Gary ditches them to finish the Golden Mile alone. Andy and Steven pursue Gary, as does the rest of Newton Haven, as Steven is captured.

In The World's End, Andy confronts Gary and reveals that his wife has recently left him and taken their children; it also comes out that Gary was committed to a psychiatric hospital following a recent suicide attempt. Andy tries to stop Gary from drawing his final pint, but Gary clings to completing the Mile, because he has nothing else to live for. When Gary pulls the lever to pour a pint, the floor lowers into a hidden chamber.

The Network, a disembodied alien entity, tells Gary and Andy that Newton Haven is one of dozens of communities infiltrated by Blanks around the world and claims responsibility for leaps in human technology in the past twenty years, all this with the end goal of assimilating humanity into the galactic community. The Network offers Gary eternal youth if he becomes a Blank, but he refuses. The Network admits that the vast majority of humans it has encountered have shown resistance, necessitating the creation of an unprecedented proportion of Blank replacements while the originals are killed and recycled as compost. Along with Andy and Steven, who has escaped, Gary calls out the tyranny in the Network's plan and demands that humanity be left to its own devices. The Network, exasperated, agrees to abandon the invasion. Sam rescues Gary, Andy, and Steven as the town is destroyed, but they are unable to outrun the pulse triggered by the departure of the Network, which deactivates Sam's car.

The pulse triggers a worldwide blackout that destroys all electrical power on Earth, sending humanity back to the Dark Ages. The remaining Blanks reactivate a few weeks later and, although they are now independent from the Network, they are mistrusted and shunned by most of the surviving humans. Andy's marriage recovers, Steven begins a relationship with Sam, and the Blank versions of Peter and Oliver pick up where their human versions left off. In the ruins of Newton Haven, the now-sober Gary enters a pub with the Blank versions of his younger friends and orders water. When the bartender refuses to serve Blanks, Gary leads his friends into a brawl with Gary declaring himself the king.

== Cast ==
- Simon Pegg as Gary King, an immature alcoholic who brings his childhood friends back together to recreate their youth.
  - Thomas Law as Young Gary
- Nick Frost as Andy Knightley, one of Gary's childhood friends who grew up to be a teetotal corporate lawyer.
  - Zachary Bailess as Young Andy
- Paddy Considine as Steven Prince, one of Gary's childhood friends who grew up to be an architect
  - Jasper Levine as Young Steven
- Martin Freeman as Oliver "O-Man" Chamberlain, one of Gary's childhood friends who grew up to be an estate agent. His nickname comes from a birthmark on his forehead resembling the number 6, which reminded his friends of the birthmark resembling three sixes that marks the Antichrist in the film The Omen.
  - Luke Bromley as Young Oliver
- Eddie Marsan as Peter Page, one of Gary's childhood friends who grew up to be a car salesman.
  - James Tarpey as Young Peter
- Rosamund Pike as Sam Chamberlain, Oliver's younger sister, whom Gary lusts after and Steven is in love with
  - Flora Slorach as Young Sam
- Pierce Brosnan as Guy Shepherd, Gary's favourite teacher.
- David Bradley as "Mad" Basil, an eccentric local man from Newton Haven.
- Darren Boyd as Shane Hawkins, Peter's former bully.
  - Richard Hadfield as Young Shane
- Michael Smiley as Trevor "The Reverend" Green, a drug dealer who sold cannabis to Gary during the 1990 attempt at the Golden Mile and now serves The Network.
- Nicholas Burns as Collaborator
- Mark Heap as Publican 7
- Steve Oram as Motorcycle Policeman
- Reece Shearsmith as Collaborator
- Bill Nighy as The Network (voice), the invading alien entity
- Sophie Evans as Becky Salt
- Samantha White as Erika Leekes
- Rose Reynolds as Tracy Benson
- Alice Lowe as Young Lady, house buyer
- Rafe Spall as Young Man, house buyer

== Production ==
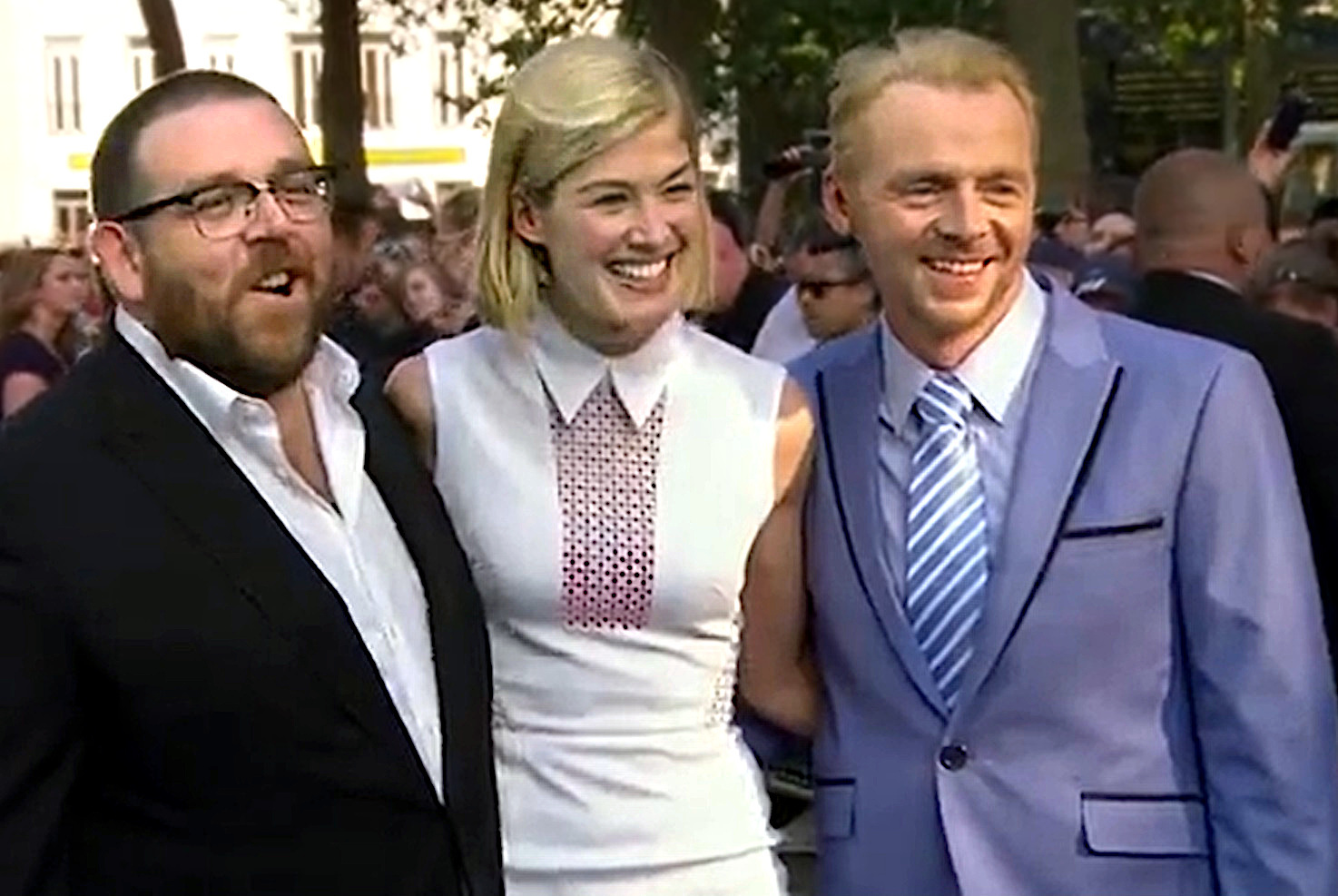
Nick Frost, Rosamund Pike and Simon Pegg at the film's premiere at Leicester Square in 2013

=== Development ===
The World's End originated as a screenplay by writer-director Edgar Wright in 1995 at the age of 21 titled Crawl, about a group of teenagers on a pub crawl. He later realised the idea could work with adult characters to capture "the bittersweet feeling of returning to your home town and feeling like a stranger". Wright also said he wanted to satirise the "strange homogeneous branding that becomes like a virus", explaining: "This doesn't just extend to pubs, it's the same with cafés and restaurants. If you live in a small town and you move to London, which I did when I was 20, then when you go back out into the other small towns in England you go 'oh my god, it's all the same!' It's like Bodysnatchers: literally our towns are being changed to death."

In an interview for Entertainment Weekly, Pegg told Clark Collis, "People think we choose the genre first every time, and it's not true. We find the stories first. The notion of alienation from your hometown taken to its literal conclusion was how we got to science fiction."

After the story was complete, Wright and Pegg examined a list of real pub names and "tried to make them like tarot cards" to foreshadow the events of the story. Wright explained: "So we said, 'OK this one's the Famous Cock, because this is where Gary is trying to puff up his own importance.' ... We did go through and work out in each one how the pub sign was going to relate."

Wright and Pegg began working intensively on the screenplay in mid-2011 at Working Title Films' offices in the United States. Producer Nira Park arranged a period in which the pair could work together in the same room, where they plotted the film scene-by-scene using flip charts. Pegg described the writing process as relatively swift, attributing this to the working rhythm he and Wright had developed through their previous collaborations.

=== Filming ===
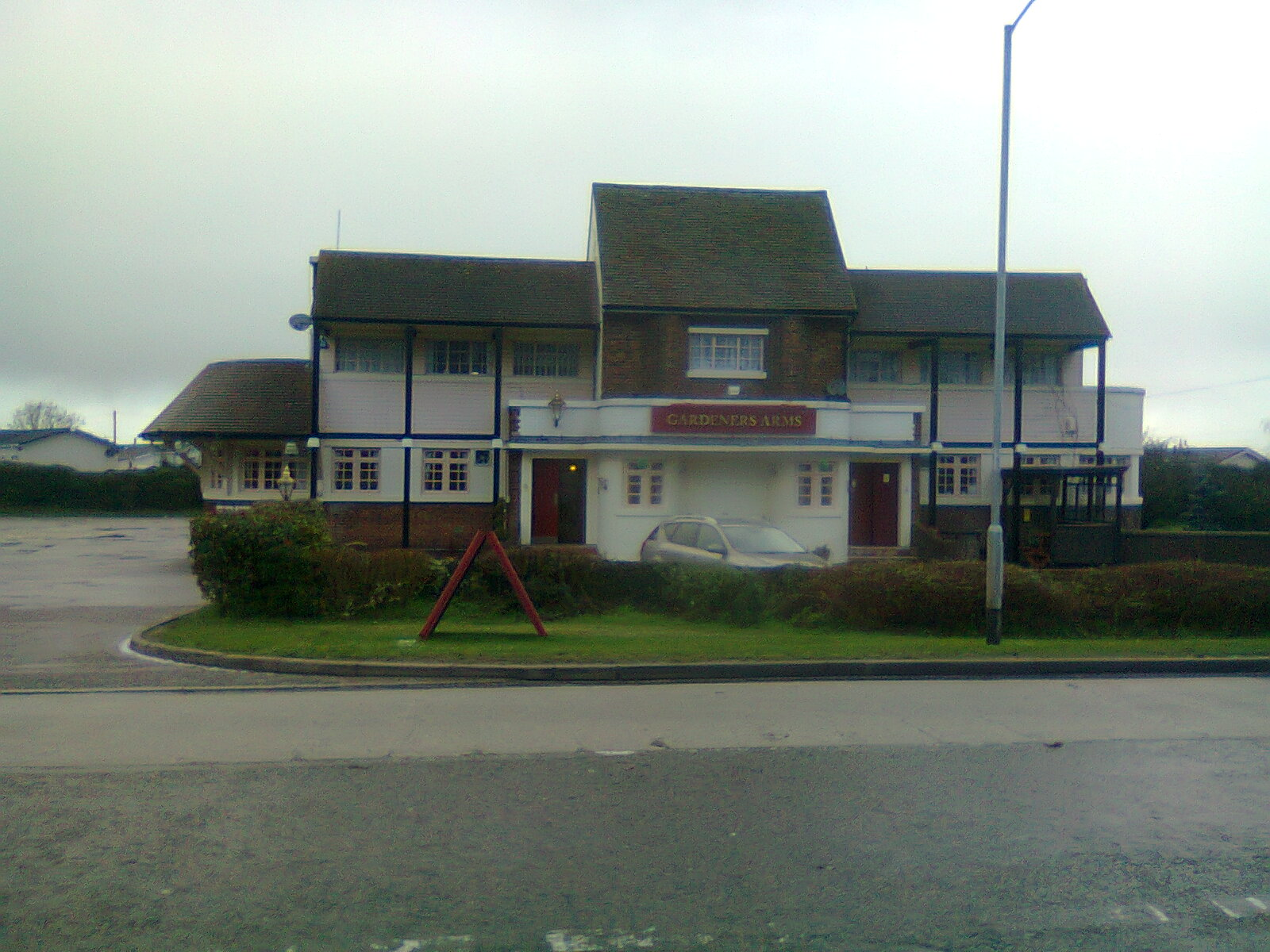
The Gardeners Arms pub on the boundary of Letchworth in Hertfordshire was used as the shooting location for the final pub, the World's End

Principal photography for The World's End began on 28 September 2012. Filming took place in Hertfordshire: at Elstree Studios and on location in Letchworth Garden City and Welwyn Garden City. Part of the film was also shot at High Wycombe railway station, Buckinghamshire.

All twelve pubs in the film use identical signage on menus and walls, reflecting what Wright called "that fake hand-written chalk" common to modern British pubs. The exteriors of the real pubs were shot at locations in Welwyn Garden City and Letchworth Garden City, with altered signage. Letchworth Garden City railway station received a makeover to become the "Hole in the Wall". Wright chose Letchworth Garden City and Welwyn Garden City partly because their early twentieth-century architecture evoked the atmosphere of British science fiction, particularly the work of John Wyndham. He noted that both settlements had Quaker origins and had historically been designed with relatively few drinking establishments, requiring the production to fabricate some of the pubs seen in the film. Stunts were coordinated by Brad Allan, of martial arts film director Jackie Chan's stunt team. Wright said: "In Drunken Master, Jackie Chan has to get drunk to fight, but this is more the idea of Dutch courage. You know, when you're kind of drunk and you think 'ah, I can climb up that scaffolding!' Or just that you're impervious to pain. One of the things we talked about is this idea that [the characters] become better fighters the more oiled they get."

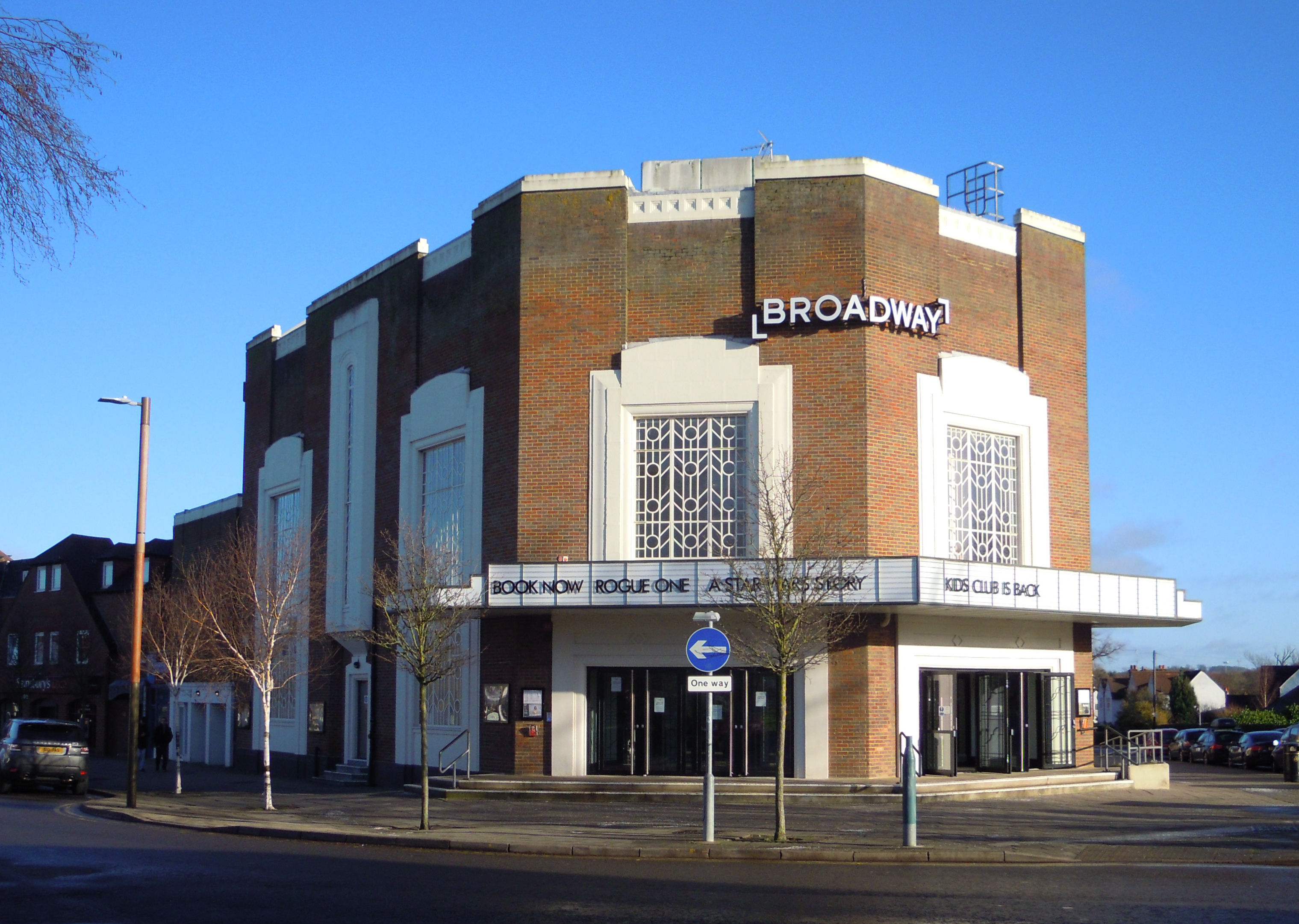
The Broadway Cinema in Letchworth doubled as The Mermaid pub in the film

The Broadway Cinema, Letchworth, a renovated independent cinema built in the 1930s in the Art Deco style, was used to portray the Mermaid pub. This cinema was also the first outside London to play the film, with a special introduction by Pegg thanking the residents of Letchworth for their help during its making; over 800 viewers watched the film at the cinema on its opening night.

Wright chose to shoot the film on photographic film rather than digitally, in keeping with Shaun of the Dead and Hot Fuzz. The main portion of the film was photographed on 35 mm film, while the 1990 prologue was shot on 16 mm film.

Wright rehearsed the film in a manner he compared to a stage play and generally avoided improvisation during filming. Movement coach Cal McCrystal worked with the principal actors and the performers playing their younger counterparts, using mirroring exercises to establish shared physical characteristics between the two versions of each character.

== Soundtrack ==
The film uses alternative rock and pop music from the time of the characters' adolescence. Wright explained: "A lot of those songs are ones that really hit me and Simon hard when we were that age... [Gary] is still living by those rules. It's like he decided to take 'Loaded' and 'I'm Free' to heart and thinks the party's never going to end."

The soundtrack for the film was released on 5 August 2013 in the UK and 20 August 2013 in the United States, with the film's score, composed by Steven Price, released on the same day. In addition to songs featured in the film, the album also features dialogue snippets.

The only songs featured in the film that did not make it onto the soundtrack are "The Only One I Know", "Summer's Magic", and "The Only Rhyme That Bites" by the Charlatans, MC Tunes and 808 State respectively. The version of "20 Seconds to Comply" which features in the film is the mix from Silver Bullet's album Bring Down the Walls No Limit Squad Returns, albeit edited to remove dialogue samples from RoboCop. On the soundtrack album, it is replaced by the Bomb Squad mix (again re-edited to remove the samples). The original soundtrack tributes the song "No Opportunity Necessary, No Experience Needed" by Yes when the young characters reach the hills.

== Release ==
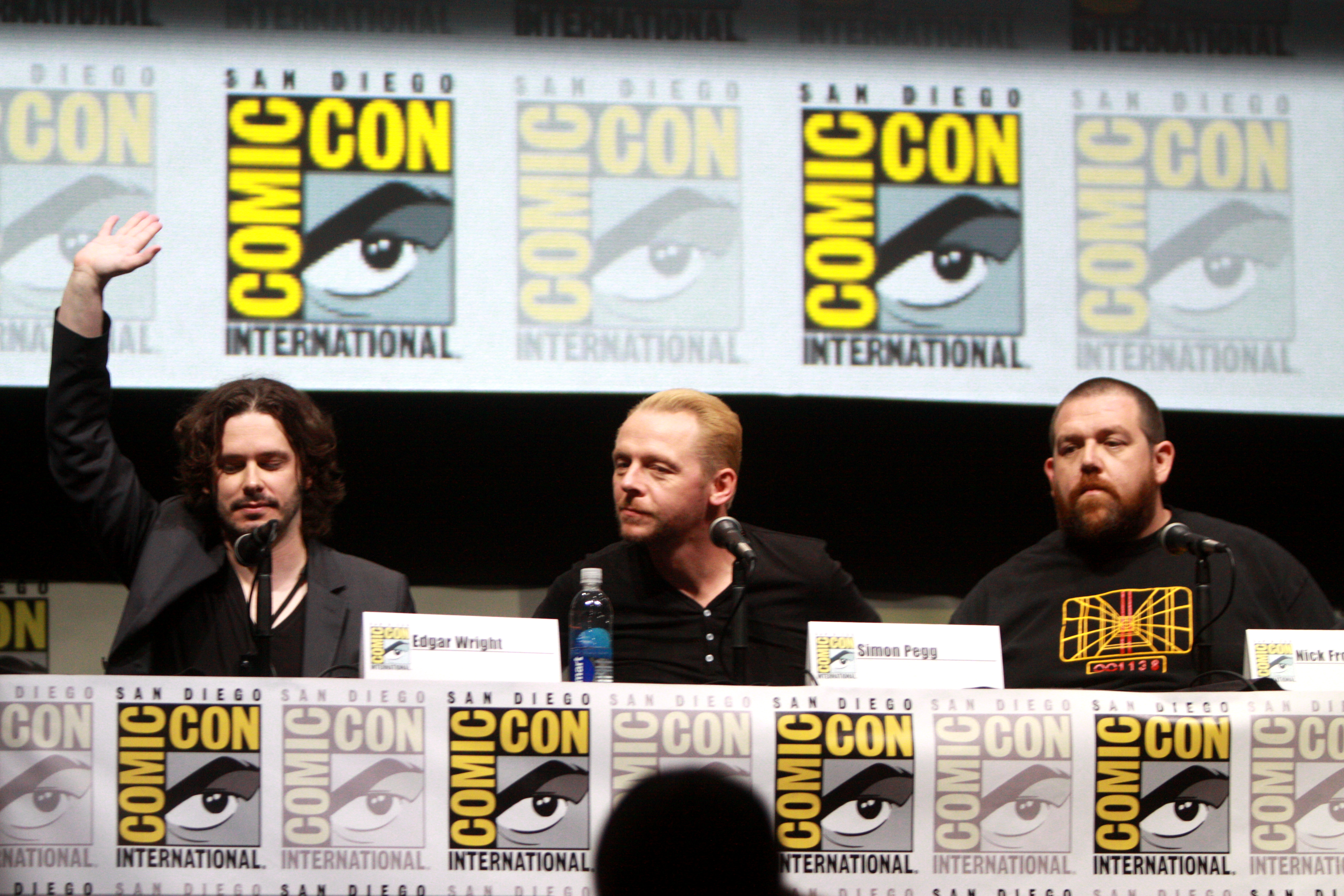
Wright, Pegg and Frost at the 2013 San Diego Comic-Con

The World's End premiered on 10 July 2013 at Leicester Square in London and was released on 19 July 2013 in the United Kingdom. It was released in the United States on 23 August 2013.

== Reception ==
=== Box office ===
The World's End earned £2,122,288 during its UK opening weekend, losing the top spot to Monsters University. Its weekend grosses were higher than Shaun of the Dead's £1.6 million but lower than Hot Fuzz's £5.4 million.

In the United States, the film was released on 23 August and earned $3.5 million on its opening day, outperforming The Mortal Instruments: City of Bones and You're Next. It had the highest per-cinema average out of all films in theatres throughout the country on its opening day. Its opening weekend, the film earned $8,790,237, finishing fourth at the box office behind Lee Daniels' The Butler, We're the Millers, and The Mortal Instruments: City of Bones. This total exceeded box office expectations, which had ranged from $7 million to $8.5 million, and was also the biggest opening weekend for any of the films in the Three Flavours Cornetto trilogy.

=== Critical reception ===
On review aggregator website Rotten Tomatoes, the film has an 89% approval rating, with a weighted average score of 7.40/10, based on 244 reviews. The website's critics consensus reads: "Madcap and heartfelt, Edgar Wright's apocalypse comedy The World's End benefits from the typically hilarious Simon Pegg and Nick Frost, with a plethora of supporting players." On Metacritic, it has a weighted average score of 81 out of 100, based on 45 critics, indicating "universal acclaim". Audiences polled by CinemaScore gave the film an average grade of "B+" on an A+ to F scale.

Chris Nashawaty of Entertainment Weekly gave the film a B+, praising it as "hilarious" and the "best" collaboration of Wright, Pegg and Frost, and saying that "these pint-swilling Peter Pans also know how to work the heart and the brain for belly laughs... The finale is a little too shaggy and silly. But what do you expect after a dozen beers?"

Mark Dinning of Empire magazine gave the film four stars out of five, writing: "Bravely refusing to rigidly adhere to a formula that has been so successful, Wright, Pegg and Frost's Cornetto Trilogy closer has tonal shifts you won't expect, but the same beating heart you've been craving."

Henry Barnes of The Guardian gave the film four stars out of five, writing: "With this final film they've slowed down a bit, grown up a lot. And saved the richest bite until last."

Keith Uhlich of Time Out New York named The World's End the ninth-best film of 2013, praising Pegg's "hilarious and heartbreaking portrait of over-the-hill deadbeatness."

== Accolades ==
At the 19th Critics' Choice Awards in January 2014, The World's End received two nominations, for Best Actor in a Comedy (for Simon Pegg) and for Best Comedy, but lost to Leonardo DiCaprio and American Hustle, respectively. The film won Best British Film at the 19th Empire Awards held in London in March 2014.

It received nominations for three awards at the 40th Saturn Awards: Best International Film, Best Writing, and Best Actor for Pegg. At the 2014 MTV Movie Awards it received nominations for: Best Fight (for Simon Pegg, Nick Frost, Paddy Considine, Martin Freeman, & Eddie Marsan) & Best Comedic Performance (for Simon Pegg).

== See also ==
- This Is the End, 2013 American apocalyptic comedy film
- Index of drinking establishment-related articles
