= Silver Bullet (rapper) =

British rapper

Silver Bullet (born Richard David Brown, 12 September 1972 in London, England) is an influential British rapper who according to PopMatters was responsible for starting "Britcore", or British hip hop, in the early 1990s.

== Career ==
Following one 1988 single "What's Dat Sound" as part of four member hip hop crew Triple Element, and two independent solo singles "Bring Forth the Guillotine" and "20 Seconds to Comply" in 1989, Silver Bullet signed with Parlophone and released one album Bring Down the Walls and two further singles "Ruff Karnage" and "Undercover Anarchist" in 1991. After a hiatus, several further singles were released from 1997 under the slightly altered name, Silvah Bullet.

== Album discography ==
- Bring Down the Walls No Limit Squad Returns (EMI - 1991) - UK #38
