= Three Flavours Cornetto =

2004–2013 films directed by Edgar Wright

- Official logo
- Directed by: Edgar Wright
- Written by: Simon Pegg; Edgar Wright
- Produced by: Nira Park; Tim Bevan (HF, TWE); Eric Fellner (HF, TWE)
- Starring: Simon Pegg; Nick Frost; (See below)
- Production companies: StudioCanal (SOTD, HF); Working Title Films; Big Talk Productions; Relativity Media (TWE)
- Distributed by: Universal Pictures
- Release dates: 9 April 2004 (SOTD); 16 February 2007 (HF); 19 July 2013 (TWE)
- Countries: United Kingdom; United States; France (SOTD, HF); Japan (TWE)
- Language: English
- Budget: Total (3 films): $38 million
- Box office: Total (3 films): $156.7 million

The Three Flavours Cornetto trilogy (also sometimes referred to as the Cornetto trilogy or the Blood and Ice Cream trilogy) is an anthology series of British comedic genre films directed by Edgar Wright, written by Wright and Simon Pegg, and produced by Nira Park. The series stars Pegg and Nick Frost, with several other actors, including Bill Nighy, Rafe Spall and Martin Freeman, also appearing in all three films. The trilogy consists of Shaun of the Dead (2004), Hot Fuzz (2007), and The World's End (2013).

The trilogy of films does not share a storyline, and is named after its repeated passing references to Cornetto ice cream cones. Produced on a combined budget of $38 million, the films grossed $156 million worldwide and garnered critical praise. In addition to brief references to the Cornetto ice cream brand, the films' plots have other common elements: each depicts romance and struggles with maturity.

The name is also a reference to the French Three Colours trilogy (1993–1994) by director Krzysztof Kieślowski.

== Films ==
Film	Cornetto Flavour	UK release date	U.S. release date	Director	Screenwriter(s)	Producer(s)
Shaun of the Dead	Strawberry	9 April 2004	24 September 2004	Edgar Wright	Edgar Wright and Simon Pegg	Nira Park
Hot Fuzz	Classico	16 February 2007	20 April 2007	Edgar Wright	Edgar Wright and Simon Pegg	Nira Park, Tim Bevan and Eric Fellner
The World's End	Mint	19 July 2013	23 August 2013	Edgar Wright	Edgar Wright and Simon Pegg	Nira Park, Tim Bevan and Eric Fellner

=== Shaun of the Dead ===
The first film is Shaun of the Dead, a 2004 zombie comedy film (self-dubbed "rom-zom-com"). Pegg plays Shaun, a man attempting to gain focus in his life as he deals with his girlfriend, his mother and stepfather in the midst of an apocalyptic uprising of zombies.

The trilogy's Cornetto reference begins with a scene in which Shaun buys a cone for his friend Ed (Frost) at his request as Ed wakes up groggy and badly hungover after a night of drinking. Director Edgar Wright has said that he used to use Cornettos as a hangover cure.

=== Hot Fuzz ===
The second entry is Hot Fuzz, a 2007 buddy cop action comedy. Pegg and Frost play police officers who investigate a series of mysterious deaths in a small English village; Danny Butterman (Frost) grew up there and Nicholas Angel (Pegg) is an outsider, accustomed to the fast-paced busy life of London law enforcement. The two officers purchase Cornetto cones at a corner shop at various times, and a scrap of the wrapper falls onto the counter when Angel later makes other purchases at a motorway service station.

=== The World's End ===
The third installment is The World's End, a 2013 apocalyptic science fiction comedy. The film follows a group of friends, led by Pegg, reattempting an epic pub crawl of their youth and discovering an alien occupation of their home town. In the final scene of the film, a Cornetto wrapper blows past in a breeze, briefly catching on a wire fence.

Wright said in an interview for Entertainment Weekly, "We thought it would be a funny idea to do a sci-fi film where even the people who are going to be your saviours are hammered."

== Connections and themes ==
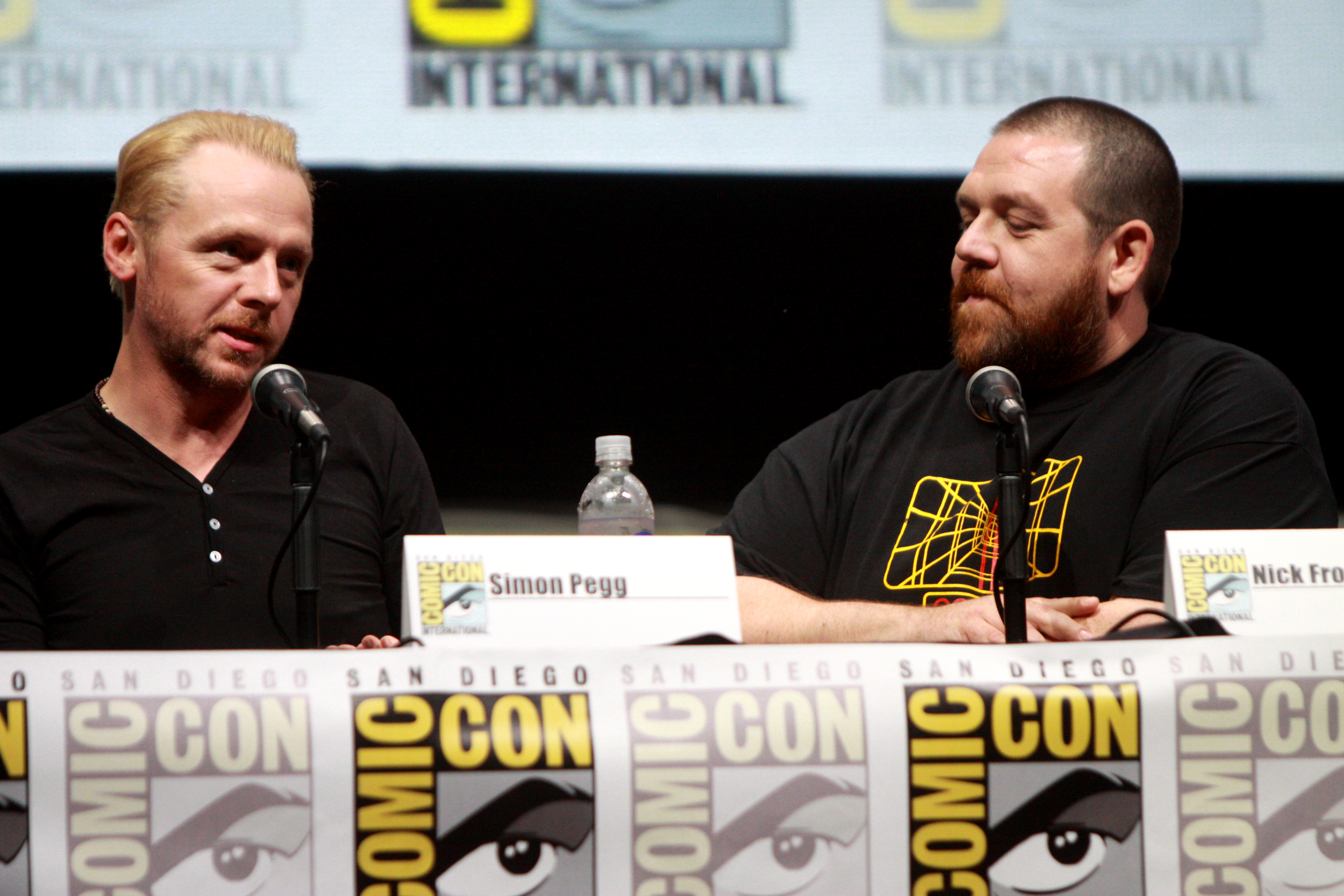
Simon Pegg and Nick Frost at the 2013 San Diego Comic-Con

The name originates from a "silly joke" during the promotion of Hot Fuzz. Wright had written in Cornetto ice cream as a hangover cure for Frost's character in Shaun of the Dead, based on his own experiences. At the after party for the film, they received free Cornetto ice creams so Wright and Pegg decided to include another reference to Cornetto in their next film in a failed attempt to get more free ice cream. In Hot Fuzz, Wright included a couple of brief throwaway scenes that referred to the Cornetto joke in Shaun. On the promotional tour of Hot Fuzz during production of The World's End, one interviewer pointed out the use of Cornetto in the first two films, and Wright jokingly said that they represent a trilogy comparable to Krzysztof Kieślowski's Three Colours film trilogy.

Wright seriously considered the three films as a trilogy, and wrote The World's End to complete themes set out in the earlier films, adding a Cornetto reference to the film. Each film in the trilogy is connected to a specific Cornetto flavour appearing in each film. Shaun of the Dead features a red strawberry-flavoured Cornetto, which signifies the film's bloody and gory elements, Hot Fuzz includes the blue original Cornetto, to signify the police element to the film, and The World's End features the green mint chocolate chip flavour (though shown only by a wrapper caught in the wind) representing "little green men" and science fiction. According to Wright, Wall's, manufacturer of the Cornetto, was "very pleased with the namecheck".

Wright considered each of the films a "Trojan horse", "genre films that have a relationship comedy smuggled inside a zombie movie, a cop movie and a sci-fi movie". Thematically, Wright saw each of the films containing common themes of "the individuals in a collective [...] about growing up and [...] about the dangers of perpetual adolescence". Wright reworked the script of The World's End to conclude on these themes. The films are further linked by a common set of actors. Wright, Park, Pegg, and Frost collaborated previously in the TV series Spaced from 1999 to 2001. Martin Freeman, Bill Nighy, Rafe Spall, Julia Deakin, Patricia Franklin, and Garth Jennings appear in each of the films as well as other projects by Wright and Pegg. Clark Collis observes in Entertainment Weekly that the films also feature "a running gag involving garden fences".

== Recurring cast ==
Discussing The World's End, Wright said that any actor who appeared in the first two films would also appear in the third, adding, "We even got back Nicola Cunningham, who played Mary the zombie in Shaun of the Dead. And Mark Donovan, so the first two zombies from Shaun of the Dead are in this. The twins are in it."

Actor	Film		
Actor	Shaun of the Dead	Hot Fuzz	The World's End
Simon Pegg	Shaun	Sgt Nicholas Angel	Gary King
Nick Frost	Ed	PC Danny Butterman	Andy Knightley
Julia Deakin	Mother of Yvonne	Mary Porter	B&B Landlady
Martin Freeman	Declan	Met Sgt.	Oliver Chamberlain
Bill Nighy	Philip	Met Chief Inspector	The Network (voice)
Rafe Spall	Noel	DC Andy Cartwright	Young Man
Patricia Franklin	Spinster	Annette Roper	Upstairs Beehive Lady
Garth Jennings	'Fun Dead' Zombie	Crack Addict	Man in Pub No. 5
Reece Shearsmith	Mark		Collaborator
Michael Smiley	Tyres		Rev. Green
Nicola Cunningham	Mary		Patient
David Bradley		Arthur Webley	Basil
Paddy Considine		DS Andy Wainwright	Steven Prince
Alice Lowe		Tina	House Buyer

== Reception ==
=== Box office ===
Film	Year	Box office gross				Budget
Film	Year	UK	U.S. and Canada	Other	Worldwide	Budget
Shaun of the Dead	2004	$12,349,489	$13,542,874	$4,147,029	$30,039,392	$6 million
Hot Fuzz	2007	$41,212,142	$23,637,265	$15,724,367	$80,573,774	$12 million
The World's End	2013	$13,354,358	$26,004,851	$6,730,078	$46,089,287	$20 million
Total		$66,915,989	$63,184,990	$26,601,474	$156,702,453	$38 million

=== Critical response ===
Film	Rotten Tomatoes	Metacritic
Shaun of the Dead	92% (7.8 average rating) (220 reviews)	76 (34 reviews)
Hot Fuzz	91% (7.7 average rating) (204 reviews)	81 (37 reviews)
The World's End	89% (7.43 average rating) (235 reviews)	81 (45 reviews)
