= Baby Driver =

2017 film by Edgar Wright

- Theatrical release poster
- Directed by: Edgar Wright
- Written by: Edgar Wright
- Produced by: Nira Park; Tim Bevan; Eric Fellner
- Starring: Ansel Elgort; Kevin Spacey; Lily James; Jon Hamm; Eiza González; Jamie Foxx
- Cinematography: Bill Pope
- Edited by: Paul Machliss; Jonathan Amos
- Music by: Steven Price
- Production companies: TriStar Pictures; MRC; Big Talk Productions; Working Title Films
- Distributed by: Sony Pictures Releasing
- Release dates: March 11, 2017 (SXSW); June 28, 2017 (US and UK)
- Running time: 113 minutes
- Countries: United Kingdom; United States
- Language: English
- Budget: $34 million
- Box office: $227 million

Baby Driver is a 2017 action film written and directed by Edgar Wright. It stars Ansel Elgort as Baby, a getaway driver seeking freedom from a life of crime with his girlfriend Debora (Lily James). Kevin Spacey, Jon Hamm, Eiza González, Jon Bernthal and Jamie Foxx appear in supporting roles. Eric Fellner and his Working Title Films partner Tim Bevan produced Baby Driver in association with Big Talk Productions' Nira Park. Sony and TriStar Pictures handled commercial distribution of the film. Baby Driver was financed through tax subsidies from the Georgia state government and a co-production pact between TriStar and MRC.

Wright conceived Baby Driver in the mid-1990s, and it became a long-gestating passion project. Originally based in Los Angeles, Wright chose Atlanta as the film's setting after the studio secured tax credits to subsidize production costs, integrating the city's ethos into an important storytelling device. Principal photography took place in Atlanta from February to May 2016. Production involved the planning of meticulously coordinated stunts, choreography, and in-camera effects. Thematic studies of Baby Driver examine patterns of color symbolism and Baby's evolving morality.

Baby Driver premiered at the South by Southwest festival on March 11, 2017, followed by releases in North America and the United Kingdom on June 28. Critics praised the film's craftsmanship and actors, though sometimes disapproved of aspects of the writing such as plot development. The National Board of Review selected Baby Driver as one of the top films of the year. It earned $227 million globally, bolstered by positive word-of-mouth support and flagging interest in blockbuster franchises. Baby Driver was nominated for numerous awards, including three Academy Awards, two BAFTA Film Awards (winning one), two Critics' Choice Awards (winning one), and a Golden Globe for Best Actor in a Musical or Comedy for Elgort, and won several other honors, chiefly for technical achievement. The success of Baby Driver spurred speculation in the media about a sequel, which remains tentatively planned as of 2026.

== Plot ==
In Atlanta, Miles, self-named "Baby", is a young getaway driver who lost his parents in a car crash that left him with tinnitus, and finds catharsis in music. He ferries crews of robbers assembled by kingpin Doc to pay off a debt as recompense for theft of a car containing Doc's illicit goods. Between jobs, he remixes snippets of recorded conversations and cares for his deaf foster father Joseph. At Bo’s Diner, a local restaurant, he meets a waitress named Debora, and they start dating.

His next robbery goes awry after an armed bystander chases them down, but Baby evades him and the police. Having paid his debt, Baby quits his life of crime and starts delivering pizzas. Baby takes Debora out on a date at a fancy restaurant where he runs into Doc, who pays for their meal. Meeting Baby outside, Doc coerces him to join a planned US Post Office heist under threat of retaliation if he refuses. The crew consists of easygoing Buddy, his sharpshooter wife Darling, and trigger-happy psychopath Bats, who takes a disliking to Baby. While the crew attempts to purchase illegal arms at a rendezvous from a contact of Doc's, the Butcher, Bats recognizes the Butcher and his men are undercover police and opens fire, resulting in most of the dealers being killed. Afterward, Bats makes Baby stop at Debora's diner, unaware of Baby and Debora's romance. Baby, aware of Bats's homicidal habit, stops him from killing her to avoid paying.

Doc is furious, revealing that the dealers were dirty cops on his payroll. He decides to cancel the heist, but Bats, Buddy and Darling disagree. Doc lets Baby decide; he chooses to go through with it. Baby attempts to slip away late that night, hoping to take Debora and leave. He is stopped by Buddy and Bats, who have discovered his recordings and believe he is a police informant; when they and Doc hear his mixtapes, they are convinced of his innocence.

During the heist, Bats kills a security guard. Disgusted, Baby refuses to drive away, causing Bats to hit him. Baby rams the car into a rebar which impales Bats, killing him. The three flee on foot. After the police kill Darling in a shootout, Buddy furiously blames Baby for her death and plans to kill him. Baby steals a car and flees to his apartment. After leaving Joseph at an assisted living home with his heist earnings, Baby rushes to Bo's for Debora, where Buddy is waiting. Baby shoots Buddy and flees with Debora as police reinforcements swarm the restaurant.

At the safe house, Doc refuses Baby's pleas for help, but relents when he sees Debora consoling him. Doc supplies them with cash and an escape route out of the country. The three are confronted by the Butcher's vengeful henchmen in the parking garage, but Doc kills them all. Buddy ambushes them with a stolen police car and kills Doc. A cat-and-mouse game ensues until Buddy has Baby at his mercy. He shoots next to both Baby's ears, temporarily deafening him, but the distraction allows Debora to subdue Buddy with a crowbar. After Baby shoots him in the leg, Buddy falls to his death.

Debora and Baby drive away together on a scenic road. Baby surrenders after they encounter a police roadblock. At Baby's trial, Joseph, Debora, and other individuals Baby helped testify as character witnesses. He is sentenced to twenty-five years in prison, with a parole hearing after five. Debora stays in contact with Baby during his incarceration, sending him postcards while he dreams of one day reuniting. Five years later, Baby reunites with Debora after being released from prison.

== Cast ==
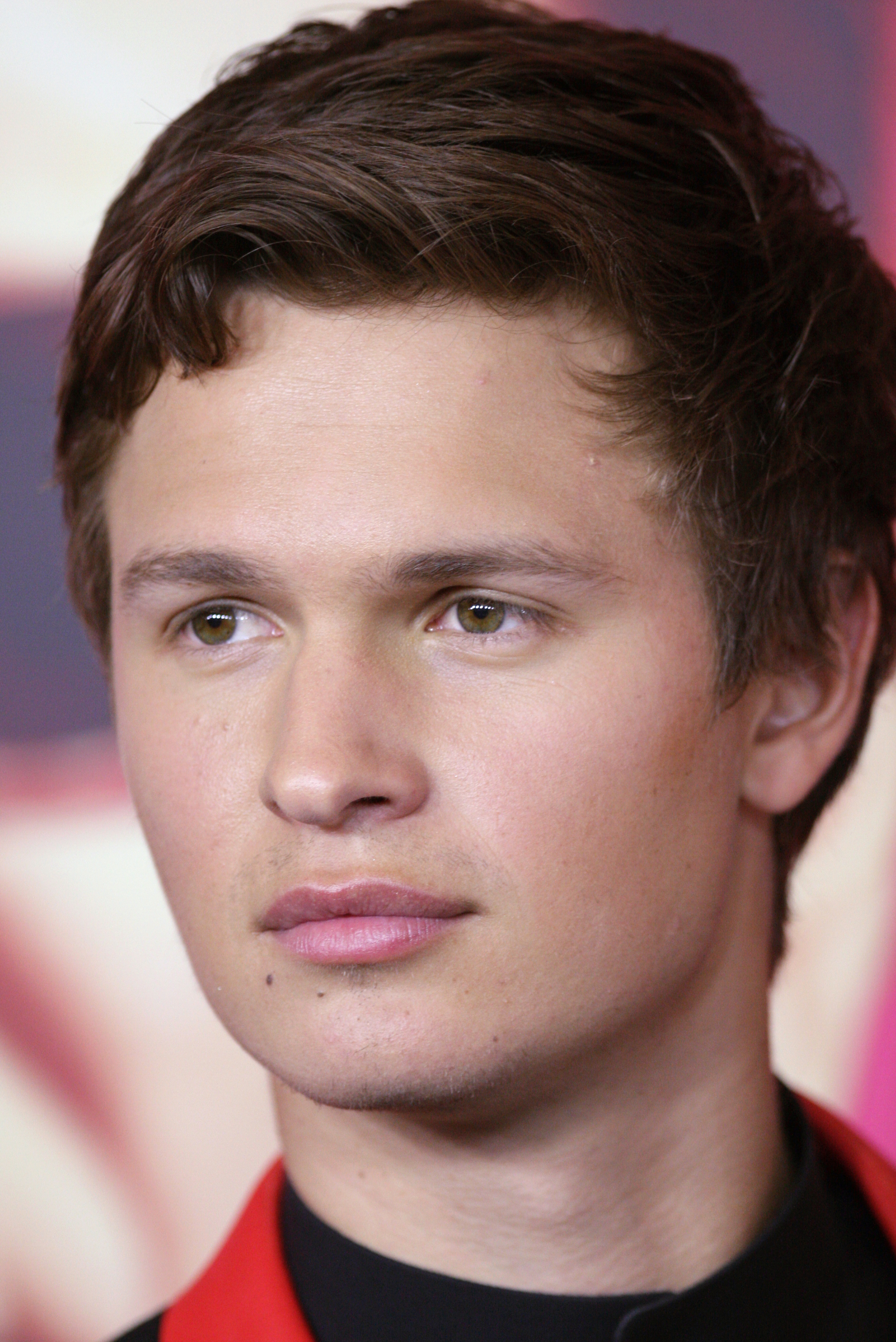
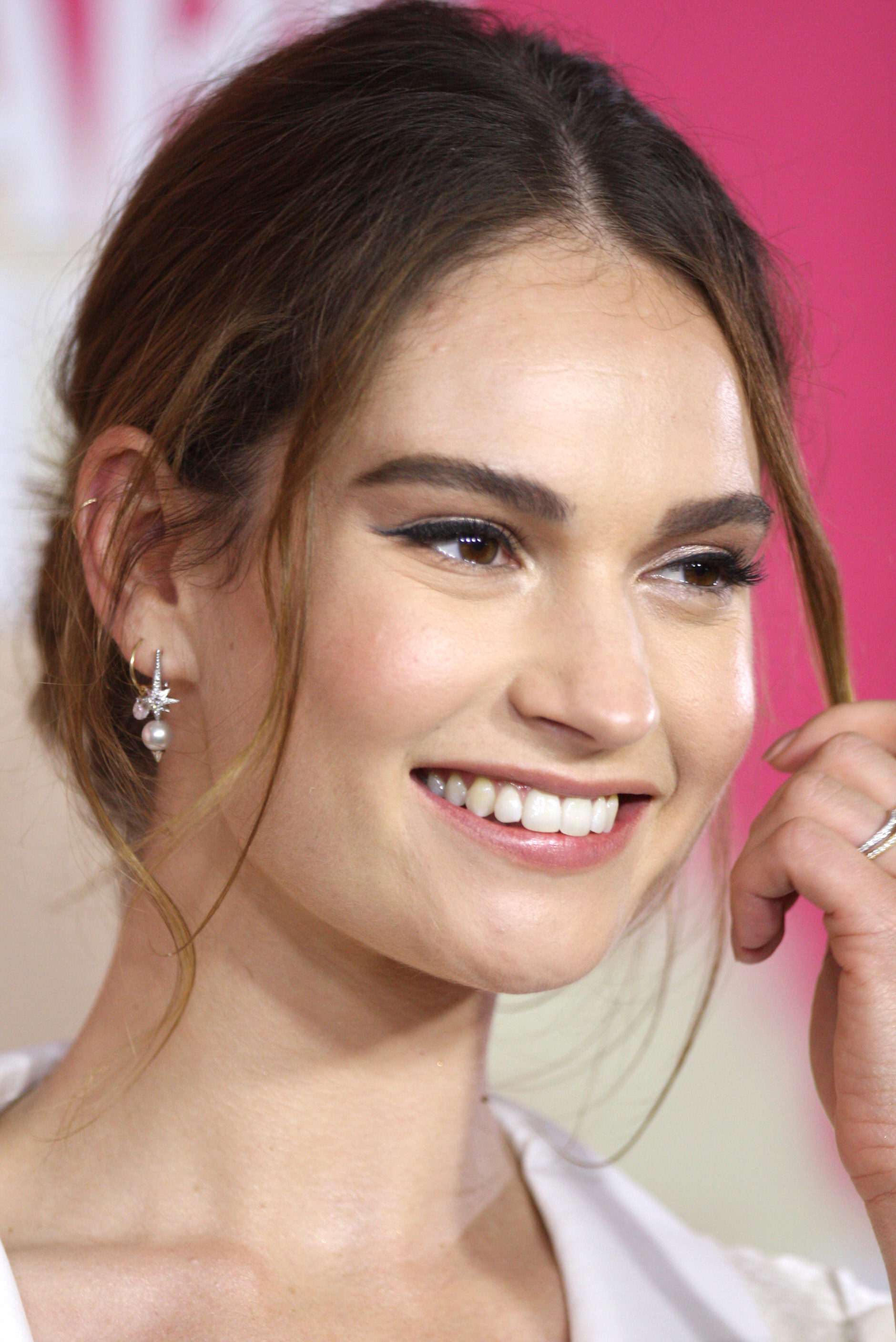
Ansel Elgort (left) and Lily James (right) at the Baby Driver Sydney premiere
- Ansel Elgort as Miles "Baby":
  A young getaway driver with an intense passion for music. Elgort regarded the character as an innocent "younger than his years, deep down". Edgar Wright and the producers at Working Title Films began contemplating the lead role well before they obtained funding for Baby Driver. Elgort, John Boyega, and Logan Lerman were among a raft of potential candidates considered for star billing. Elgort auditioned for the part because he found the screenplay compelling. He auditioned several times, but was hired based on a taped audition where he lip synced and danced to the Commodores' 1977 single "Easy". Wright was so impressed that the song was added to the film's soundtrack. The writer-director explained his selection of Elgort: "There's an element of an old soul in Ansel and that was something I thought connected with what I had already written."
  - Hudson Meek as young Baby
- Lily James as Debora:
  A waitress employed at Bo's Diner who becomes Baby's girlfriend. Emma Stone was an early candidate for the role during development.
- Kevin Spacey as "Doc":
  The mysterious kingpin of an Atlanta-based crime syndicate to whom Baby owes a debt. Spacey's involvement in Baby Driver was announced in the press in November 2015.
- Jon Hamm as Jason "Buddy" van Horn:
  A laid-back criminal, former stockbroker and the husband of Darling. He and his wife are both members of Doc's crew of bank robbers and Buddy was brought into the criminal underworld by a drug habit. His impulsive decisions are the result of a mid-life crisis. Wright envisioned Buddy as a strong, suave, handsome character à la Doc McCoy (Steve McQueen) in The Getaway (1972) and Jack Foley (George Clooney) in Out of Sight (1998), yet much more sinister. Hamm is the only actor in Baby Driver whose character was written specifically for them, as Wright is a longtime friend and fan of his. The two men first met at a Saturday Night Live afterparty in 2008. Hamm took part in a table read several years before Baby Driver was commissioned by a studio.
- Eiza González as Monica "Darling" Costello:
  Buddy's young, vivacious wife and the only woman in Doc's heist crew. She and Buddy form an intensely intimate, Bonnie and Clyde-esque pairing. Describing her as a vapid "crook space-cadet woman who has no attachment to reality", González joined the production in December 2015.
- Jamie Foxx as Leon "Bats" Jefferson III:
  Doc's particularly sadistic, ruthless henchman, who has little regard for the people in his way. Foxx was a casting choice recommended to Wright, although he had reservations and felt the actor would not be enthusiastic about a supporting role. Foxx was fascinated with the film's artistic direction, and joined the project thanks to the support of Quentin Tarantino. He modeled Bats after a longtime friend he first met at a Los Angeles comedy club in his youth.
- Jon Bernthal as Griffin "Griff":
  One of Doc's toughest henchmen responsible for the security of his heist crew. Bernthal believed criminals were too often stereotyped as incompetent in news media. Therefore, to prepare for his role, the actor consulted with real-life career criminals to get a better grasp on his character and the inner workings of organized crime. He said in an interview, "There's your idiots who hold up a place and get caught because they leave their wallet there, but there's mastermind criminals and they all come in different shapes and sizes and different levels of intellect. I think there are people with real talent and people who take it enormously seriously, and those are the kinds of people I talked to."
- CJ Jones as Joe:
  Baby's foster father, who is deaf and a wheelchair user. Casting director Francine Maisler was tasked with hiring a suitable actor to play Joseph. Though Jones was significantly younger than the role called for, he was hired from a handful of prospective actors, most of whom were not deaf. Jones opted not to work with an on-set interpreter until later in production. He also helped Elgort hone his sign language (ASL) with an on-set tutor.

Other cast members include Flea as Eddie "No Nose", Lanny Joon as JD, Sky Ferreira as Baby's biological mother (an aspiring singer), R. Marcus Taylor as Armie, a crooked police officer, Lance Palmer as Baby's biological father (an abusive alcoholic), Big Boi and Killer Mike as restaurant patrons, Paul Williams as "The Butcher", Walter Hill as the voice of a courtroom ASL interpreter, and Jon Spencer as a prison guard. Noel Fielding and Nick Frost have cameos through archive footage on Baby's TV, appearing in the music video for Mint Royale's "Blue Song" (directed by Wright), in which Fielding played a prototypical version of Baby.

== Production ==
=== Development ===
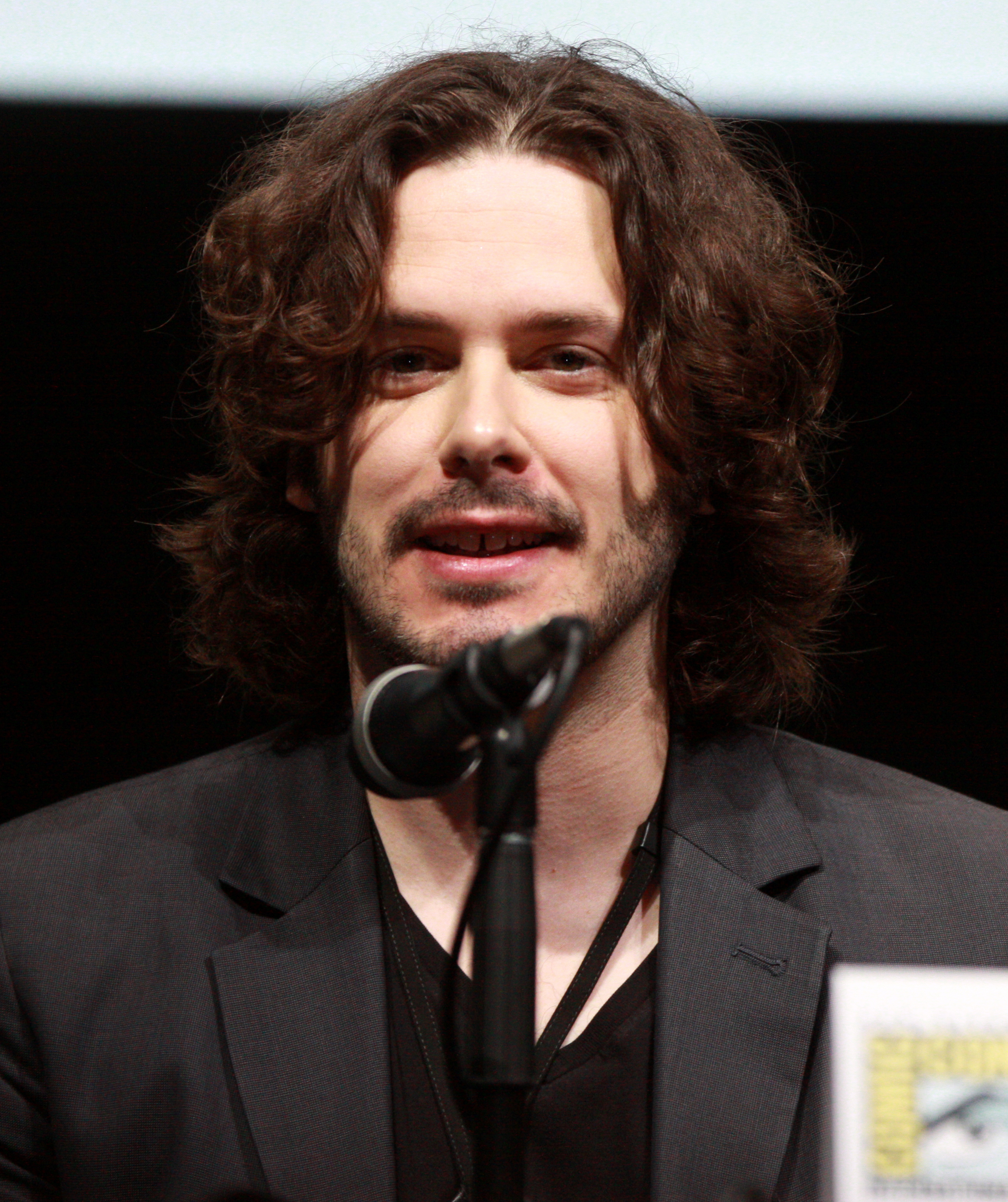
Edgar Wright in 2013

Baby Driver was a longtime passion project Wright had been developing since 1995, when the writer-director was a struggling 21-year-old filmmaker living in suburban London. He had relocated to London to finish his first professional film, the low-budget western comedy A Fistful of Fingers, and to contemplate his future in entertainment. Wright's repeated listening to Orange (1994), the fourth studio album by the Jon Spencer Blues Explosion, provided the impetus for Baby Driver. At first he envisioned a high-speed car chase that was prefaced with a dance sequence soundtracked to "Bellbottoms". Though this was ultimately written into the script as the film's opening sequence, Wright's nascent vision was far from a fully realized project. By the time Baby Driver took definite form, the advent of the iPod, Wright's childhood tinnitus, and his reading of Oliver Sacks' Musicophilia (2007), which explores the neuroscience of music, were forces shaping the project's artistic direction.

On a £25,000 budget, Wright developed the music video for Mint Royale's "Blue Song" in 2003, featuring a backstory gleaned from his early concept for Baby Driver. "Blue Song" became an unexpected success, and although happy with his work, Wright was frustrated he had cannibalised an idea he felt had enormous potential. The director said that, in retrospect, he considers his music video seminal for providing proof of concept for Baby Driver. The release of Wright's first major feature, Shaun of the Dead (2004), was another important catalyst, not only for its artistic direction, but also for signaling the start of a long-term working relationship between Wright and Working Title producers, who would assist with Baby Driver's development. By 2007, after signing a multi-picture deal with Working Title, and with a clearer vision of the project, Wright met with Steven Price to discuss early musical ideas for Baby Driver. The drafting of a story started around the release of Scott Pilgrim vs. the World (2010), but pre-production of the film stalled as Wright's other projects—The World's End (2013) and the then-forthcoming Ant-Man (2015), for which he had already prepared a script with Joe Cornish—took precedence. Work resumed immediately after Wright's departure from Ant-Man, when the studio began assembling their roster of actors and technical staff before shooting. In preparation, Wright spent time with ex-career criminals in Los Angeles and London to develop an accurate depiction of a real-life bank robber's work.

Wright, lead film editor Paul Machliss, and Los Angeles-based editor Evan Schiff devised a pre-edit of Baby Driver with animatics in the initial stages of production. With Avid Media Composer, Machliss was tasked with syncopating each animatic to a corresponding song. He and Wright had an existing professional relationship from Scott Pilgrim vs. the World and The World's End. In addition, Machliss worked on set providing input for the shoot, which is unusual for a film editor.

=== Filming ===
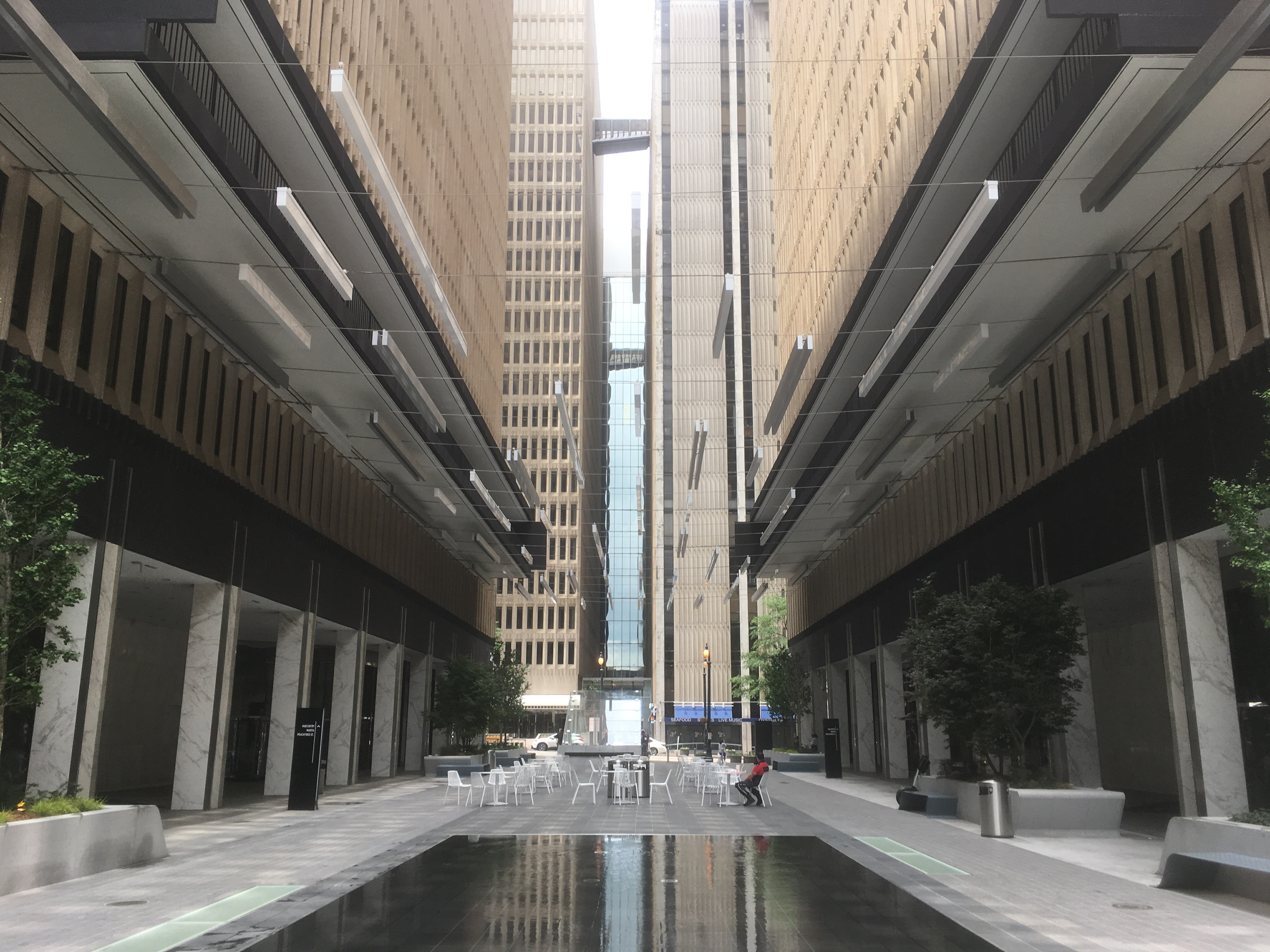
Baby Driver was primarily filmed in downtown Atlanta, where location shots showcase local landmarks such as Peachtree Center (pictured in 2019).

Los Angeles was to have been Baby Driver's original setting, but prohibitively expensive production costs made shooting there impractical. Instead, the studio toured cities that offered generous transferable tax credits for film production. These included Atlanta, which emerged as the frontrunner during preliminary scouting. Preserving the city's ethos was imperative for an authentic story, for Atlanta typically doubles for other global cities in blockbuster cinema. Wright spent about a week observing the cityscape to facilitate the necessary revisions to the script. He found Baby Driver's story better realized in Atlanta because of the city's renown as a logistics hub. Principal photography, which lasted four months from February to May 2016, took place mostly in the central business district. Location shots showcase many of Atlanta's landmarks (such as Peachtree Center), cultural institutions, and even local media. Elsewhere, filming occurred in Gainesville and rural Monroe County, Georgia. Although other suburban areas of Atlanta were scouted for main unit filming, Wright preferred the city's urbanity over the dense vegetation of the suburbs, which he considered an unsuitable backdrop for the film. According to the Georgia Department of Economic Development's film production office, Baby Driver contributed $30.1 million to the local economy through wages, transportation, rental equipment, and other expenditures.

Wright cited Vanishing Point (1971), American Graffiti (1973), The Driver (1978), Point Break (1991), Reservoir Dogs (1992), and Heat (1995), among others, as significant influences on the film's visual hallmarks and creative direction. To evoke their aesthetic, one of the production's main goals was to produce Baby Driver using practical filmmaking techniques. This meant planning meticulously coordinated stunts and choreography, and shooting as much of the film in-camera as possible, using visual effects only when necessary. Baby Driver was director of photography Bill Pope's third film with Wright, following Scott Pilgrim vs. the World and The World's End. Pope shot the project mostly on 35mm Kodak film stock, utilizing Panavision Panaflex Millennium XL2 cameras with G-Series, T-Series, and C-Series 2.39:1 anamorphic widescreen lenses. Occasionally, to capture more intense stunts, and to achieve unusual camera angles Wright demanded for certain scenes, the crew shot in Super 35 format with specialized cameras. Panavision's Atlanta offices assisted with the needs of the production when logistics management became challenging. The climactic scene in particular, staged in a parking garage at the Atlanta Falcons' training facility, which was available only at night, was difficult to shoot because of the darkness. The scene ended up being filmed digitally using the company's Arri Alexa camera system, which has greater exposure latitude.

=== Visual effects ===
Few visual effects were used in Baby Driver as a result of Wright's emphasis on practical filmmaking. The London-based studio DNEG, under the supervision of Stuart Lashley and Shailendra Swarnkar, created most of the visual effects that were needed. Their work for the film comprised 430 shots created with a workforce of 120 specialized artists. The team's work began while viewing early animatics of Baby Driver, which they used as a reference to help conceive the film's audiovisual repertoire. DNEG used Nuke to animate car chase scenes that could not be rendered with in-camera effects. As these scenes were routinely updated with reshoots, the team was tasked with maintaining the software's control tools so artists would be readily equipped to work with the latest audio. Molinare also produced effects shots for Baby Driver.

According to Lashley, key scenes that highlight the film's audiovisual repertoire were "Harlem Shuffle", the single tracking shot of Baby's coffee run through town, and "Tequila", the sequence of a deadly shootout between Doc's syndicate and undercover police. "Harlem Shuffle" was one of Baby Driver's most elaborate sequences; filmmakers cached excess footage so the shot could be manageable. The set design of "Tequila" involved precise coordination of the in-camera effects. Once filmed, DNEG supplemented the live-action shots with bullets, sparks, and gunfire flashes, while bearing in mind the imposing drum riffs of the soundtrack. The team found that compositing shots to audio, although suitable for live-action projects, presented unique challenges, such as how to convey emotional cues to the viewer.

For "Brighton Rock", the climactic sequence of Baby Driver, DNEG enhanced footage with computer-generated shots for safety and damage control. First, to portray characters being pummeled by cars, the team filmed the accidents in stages. The footage was then composited into complete shots, lending a sense of realism and control. The shot of Buddy's stolen police car falling in the parking garage atrium from the top level required setting up a shorter, safer drop at another side of the garage with a crane to comply with the owner's demands. DNEG created a set extension from a lidar scan of the atrium, with superimposed special effects to extend the fall.

=== Stunts and choreography ===
Second-unit director Darrin Prescott coordinated the vehicular stunts for Baby Driver with Jeremy Fry, the project's stunt driver, and a team of other professionals. They rehearsed at the Atlanta Motor Speedway before receiving clearance to shoot in the city. At the rehearsals, filmmakers captured the stunts with specialized pursuit cranes, small cars with an installed camera crane. Machliss would then edit the footage into updated animatics, fleshing out the precision of the stunts in time for shooting. Fry performed many of the vehicular stunts; the actors were allowed to perform less demanding stunts with the proper training.

Prescott saw Baby Driver as his biggest undertaking because of the complicated stunt work involved. One such scene features a "180 in and 180 out" maneuver, in which Fry makes 180-degree turns forward and backward in a narrow alley with several other vehicles in the way. This was shot in five or six takes. "There's a lot going through your head. You don't want Jeremy to get hurt. Also, there's a lot of money being spent to get this on camera. The cameras needed to be out of the way so nobody would get hurt", Prescott recalled. Another example is the freeway car chase scene midway in Baby Driver's opening sequence. The production had only an eight-hour window to shoot because they did not have clearance to shut down I-85. With the limited time frame, the filmmakers rehearsed for only an hour before they began filming in early morning. This scene involved a number of high-speed jumps, and barrier jumps, among other stunts, that Prescott and his team carefully coordinated bearing traffic flow in mind. There were also 50 production vehicles encircled by a sprawling police motorcade, occupying all lanes of I-85. The choice of the getaway cars corresponded to specifications in the screenplay that they be nondescript and blend in with the surrounding traffic. Though Wright sought a Toyota Corolla based on data about frequently stolen cars, the production used a red Subaru WRX instead after the studio requested a vehicle that "could be a little sexier".

Ryan Heffington oversaw the choreography. He was responsible for synchronizing the movement of the actors and stunt performers in the film's choreographic sequences. Baby Driver was Heffington's first foray into film; he is best known in the music industry for his work with Sia and Arcade Fire, among other artists. Though compelled by the script, the choreographer was unfamiliar with Wright's prior work, which he researched after his initial interview for the job. The two detailed their artistic vision in early conversations, using songs with dramatic tempo changes or structure as templates. By the first day of shooting, Heffington was already supervising the "Harlem Shuffle" sequence, employing 50–60 extras. Choreographing other sequences was sometimes less taxing because Elgort and Foxx had prior dance experience. The production played the music as the cast rehearsed each sequence, shot by shot.

=== Sound design ===
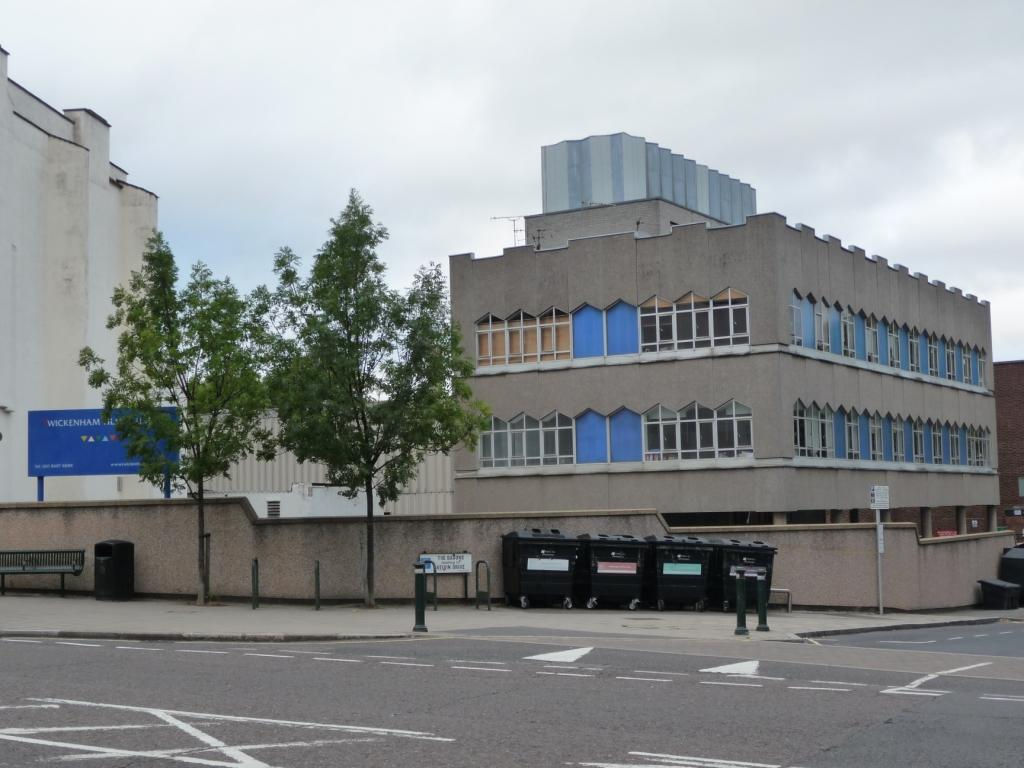
The production premixed audio at the London-based Twickenham Studios (pictured in 2010).

When sound editing supervisor Julian Slater was first approached for Baby Driver, he was sent a copy of the script and a PDF file containing the curated selection of music, along with a rough audio mix. Working closely with music editor Bradley Farmer, he dissected each musical cue into a unique tempo map, thereby allowing for synchronization at any given time. Their work required frequent pitch scaling of sounds so they would not be off-pitch with the music. They experimented with different sounds for Baby's tinnitus, which is sometimes subtle, and sometimes more noticeable. Its intensity in the audio mix depended on Baby's mood; for example, the more anxious he is, the louder the ringing. Managing tempo changes with the sound effects proved troublesome. Slater said Farmer showed him that, "For every layer that happens musically, [you should] have another layer that happens non-musically so that you perceive it only some of the time." The "Harlem Shuffle" sequence contains the audio team's most complex sound effects work. Completed in 25 takes, it features an assortment of subtle sound effects from engines, dialogue with changing nuance, and so forth. "Brighton Rock" posed another challenge for the filmmakers because the sequence required a new set of frequencies, altered voices, and other sounds to emphasize Baby's disoriented state.

The audio department spent eight days recording car sound effects at Atlanta Motor Speedway. For onboard recordings (the sounds heard from the perspective of the driver and passengers), sound effects recordist Watson Wu installed about six microphones per vehicle; one in the airbox, another on the radio dashboard, two near the exhausts, and two in the engine compartment. Boom operator James Peterson followed each car with a shotgun mic for the external recordings, while using XY stereo equipment to capture the noise of passing vehicles. The crew premixed their audio at the Twickenham Studios in London, and the final mixing took place at Goldcrest Films' Soho post-production facility.

=== Music ===
Wright and Price compiled a shortlist of ten songs to shape Baby Driver's musical direction. In total, up to 36 tracks were licensed with Right Music. Wright was unable to use certain hip hop and electronic songs written in the script because they contained samples not cleared for copyright. At that point, he pursued licensing of the sampled songs to use for the film's soundtrack. Danger Mouse and Kid Koala composed the album's only original tracks, "Chase Me" and "Was He Slow?". "Chase Me" features contributions from Run the Jewels and Big Boi. For "Was He Slow?", which samples some of Spacey and Bernthal's dialogue, Kid Koala produced the song using analog equipment.

Columbia imprint 30th Century Records released the Baby Driver soundtrack on June 23, 2017, on vinyl and CD. Baby Driver Volume 2: The Score For a Score, a follow-up album containing previously unreleased content, was issued on April 13, 2018.

== Themes ==
Baby Driver uses colors to symbolize the personas of the core characters. Baby's muted sensibility clashes with the bright, vibrant colors worn by Bats, Darling, and Buddy.

Wright views Baby's moral shift as the thematic crux of the film. According to David Sims at The Atlantic, Baby's initial moral detachment manifests through his use of music as escapism from conflict and his tinnitus. It is only his obligation to protect Debora and Joseph and the increasing mayhem around him that force Baby to confront reality. Baby Driver employs some of the conventions of gangster film, chiefly heroic fatalism and uncompromising villainy.

Characteristic of Wright's films, Baby Driver is driven by strong color cues. Colors are used symbolically to represent the personas of the core characters. At the beginning, whereas Baby dresses in drab colors that reflect his black-and-white perspective of the universe, his peers are associated with bright, vibrant colors that clash with this sensibility: red for Bats, purple and pink for Darling, and blue for Buddy. As the story progresses and the pressures of organized crime become overwhelming, Baby's wardrobe evolves, and he is seen in faint grays and bloodstained white shirts. Costume designer Courtney Hoffman said she incorporated light gray colors into Baby's wardrobe to illustrate his struggle for freedom from the criminal world. The significance of red also transforms in tandem with the story, from a motif symbolizing the bloodthirsty Bats to one denoting Buddy's rage after the death of his lover. Justin Chang of the Los Angeles Times argues that Baby Driver is an exploration of identity and personal style, and how said expression dictates one's status in society.

In their piece for the Los Angeles Review of Books, David Hollingshead and Jane Hu examine race as an important thematic element in Baby Driver. They contend that certain aspects of the film, such as the casting choices and the appeal to a "white innocence" narrative for Baby's redemption arc, underscore a race consciousness and subtext about the ethics of cultural appropriation.

== Marketing and release ==
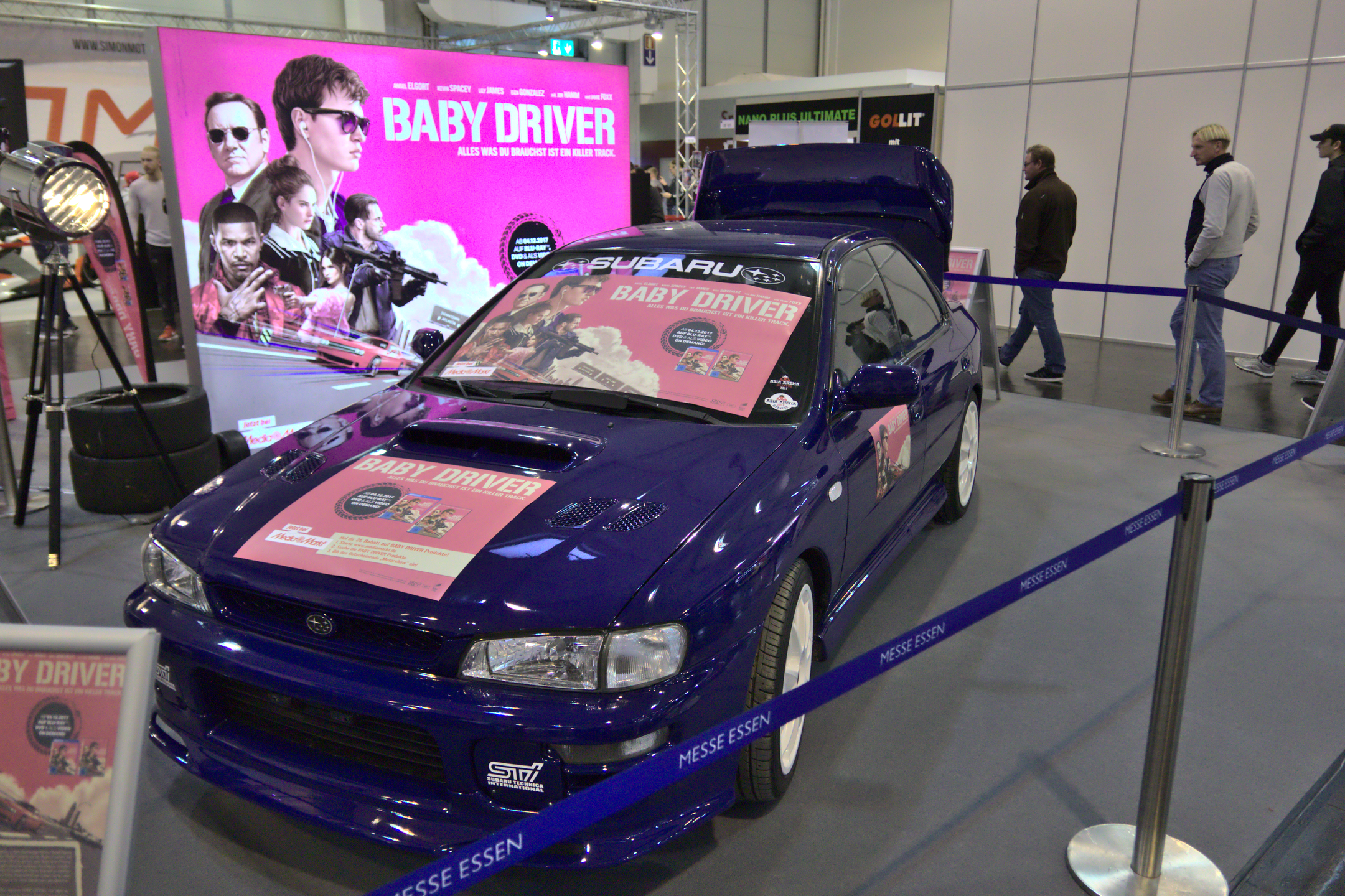
Prop display at the Essen Motor Show in Germany (pictured in 2017).

TriStar spearheaded the marketing campaign. Their strategy entailed aggressive social media engagement, a worldwide publicity tour, and the creation of a number of colorful, vintage-style character posters. Baby Driver premiered at the South by Southwest festival on March 11, 2017. TriStar and Sony initially scheduled a mid-August release for the film in North America and the United Kingdom, but, in an unusual move, the studios expedited the release by six weeks to June 28 as a result of the enthusiastic response from the film festival circuit. This was considered unusual because box office competition is traditionally less intense during late summer, and hence a more favorable market for lower-budget films.

=== Home media ===
Sony Pictures Home Entertainment released Baby Driver for video on demand on September 12, 2017, and on Blu-ray, DVD, and 4K Ultra HD/Blu-ray combo formats on October 10. Physical copies contain two hours of bonus content, including behind-the-scenes footage, production rehearsals, a storyboard gallery, audio commentaries, and the music video for "Blue Song". During its first week on sale in the United States, Baby Driver was the number two selling film on DVD and Blu-ray, with 226,657 units sold for $5.6 million. Baby Driver sold 595,111 copies by January 2018. The premium cable networks Showtime and FX have US broadcast syndication rights for Baby Driver. It is also available to Showtime subscribers via the network's streaming services.

== Reception ==
=== Box office ===
Baby Driver was a financial success. Although the film's performance faltered in China, it performed strongly in key North American and European markets until the end of its theatrical run. Baby Driver earned $107.8 million in the United States and Canada and $119.1 million in other territories, for a worldwide total of $227 million. It was the 42nd-highest-grossing film of 2017, and Wright's highest-grossing film to date. The TriStar–Media Rights Capital partnership recouped their budget with a $51.5 million net profit, factoring in marketing costs and other expenses. Good word-of-mouth support, as well as fatiguing interest in blockbuster franchises, were considered critical to Baby Driver's box office success.

In the United States, exit polling showed strong commercial potential across a variety of audiences. CinemaScore polls conducted during opening night revealed the average grade filmgoers gave Baby Driver was "A−" on an A+ to F scale. Audiences were mostly younger; 52% were under 25 and 57% were men. The main reasons given for seeing the film were its action (44%), the actors (26%), and Wright (16%). Hourly advanced ticket sales eclipsed that of Transformers: The Last Knight. Predictions, while acknowledging the positive media response and word-of-mouth support for Baby Driver, were conflicted about the long-term commercial viability of an economical film in a fiercely competitive market. The film earned $5.7 million on its first day, including $2.1 million from Tuesday night previews, and followed by another $3.3 million on Thursday. It debuted at second earning $30 million from 3,226 theaters, trailing Despicable Me 3. This return surpassed Sony's expectations for the weekend, and marked the best opening of any Wright-directed film in the United States to date. Its second weekend earnings dropped by 36.7 percent to $13 million, and followed by another $8.8 million the third weekend. By August 14, the film's domestic earnings topped $100 million. TriStar re-expanded the film's theater presence for the week of August 25, earning $1.2 million from 1,074 theaters, a 34% increase from the prior week. Baby Driver completed its theatrical run in North America on October 19, 2017.

Baby Driver was released in 16 further markets between June 28 and July 2, 2017—its overall rank for the weekend was second to Despicable Me 3. The United Kingdom represented the film's largest taking with £3.6 million from 680 cinemas. It took $1.8 million in the second week, and the third week in the United Kingdom saw the box office drop by just 26%. As of the latest figures, Baby Driver earned $16.6 million in the United Kingdom. On its opening weekend elsewhere, it earned $3.7 million in Australia, $1.7 million in Mexico, $1.7 million in France, $1.2 million in Germany, $1.2 million in Brazil, $843,000 in Spain, and $620,000 in Malaysia. During its mid-September opening in South Korea, Baby Driver grossed $3.12 million. By September 3, the film's offshore gross had exceeded $102.2 million.

=== Critical response ===
"Baby Driver, a new vehicular-action-thriller-jukebox-musical-romance from the British writer-director Edgar Wright, is almost as entertaining as it is hyphen-depleting. This is movie craftsmanship and showmanship of a very high order."

— Justin Chang, Los Angeles Times

The American press considered Baby Driver among the strongest films of 2017. The film was selected by the National Board of Review as one of their top choices for the organization's annual top ten films list. Several journalists praised the film for its craftsmanship, which they saw as an exercise of Wright's expertise. Empire's Terri White called Baby Driver "one of the most utterly original films in years" that comes "as close to a car-chase opera as you'll ever see on screen". Peter Bradshaw of The Guardian felt the film was stylish and engaging, "packed with sheer brio and good nature", despite sticking with romantic notions of car chasing being a victimless crime, and Variety's Peter Debruge said Baby Driver becomes a genre standout through "a mostly clever collection of jokes, sudden narrative U-turns, [...] aptly picked songs", and a strong emphasis on car chases.

Reviews for the actors' performances were very positive in the media, often singling out Elgort and James for further praise, with their work described as "star-making" and "radiant". The characterization divided journalists, with several criticizing the depiction of some characters, often the women, in their reviews. Debora was viewed as a somewhat underdeveloped character by Eric Kohn of IndieWire, whereas White felt that, because of the sparse details of her backstory, she lacked depth and too often has little agency of her own. Richard Brody of The New Yorker considered Baby Driver's dialogue "almost entirely functional", devoid of nuance, resulting in characters who are largely interchangeable despite the best efforts of a diverse cast. Others, such as David Edelstein of Vulture magazine and the Observer's Thelma Adams, cited character development as one of the film's strengths.

The scriptwriting and plot development in the film's climactic scenes were sources of criticism. Some reviewers cited the scriptwriting as Baby Driver's biggest flaw, where rapid tonal shifts undermined the viewing experience. Cineaste's Adam Nayman, for example, attributed the mistakes in the script to Wright's inexperience as a solo writer, and TheWrap saw the lost momentum as "jarring and uncommon" saying, "rarely do we see a filmmaker start so strong only to end with a whimper". Anthony Lane, writing for The New Yorker, felt the film takes itself too seriously and lacks the self-awareness of Wright's other action comedies, such as Hot Fuzz (2007).

In 2025, it was one of the films voted for the "Readers' Choice" edition of The New York Times' list of "The 100 Best Movies of the 21st Century," finishing at number 252.

Baby Driver has an approval rating of 92% based on 395 professional reviews on the review aggregator website Rotten Tomatoes, with an average rating of 8.1/10. Its critical consensus reads, "Stylish, exciting, and fueled by a killer soundtrack, Baby Driver hits the road and it's gone—proving fast-paced action movies can be smartly written without sacrificing thrills". Metacritic gave it a weighted average score of 86 out of 100 based on reviews from 53 critics, indicating "universal acclaim".

=== Accolades ===
Baby Driver was nominated for Best Film Editing, Best Sound Editing and Best Sound Mixing at the 90th Academy Awards. It received two nominations for Best Editing and Best Sound, at the 71st British Academy Film Awards, winning the former, and two nominations at the 23rd Critics' Choice Awards, winning Best Editing. At the 75th Golden Globe Awards, Ansel Elgort was nominated at the Best Actor – Motion Picture (Musical or Comedy). Other nominations for the film included five Empire Awards (winning two) and one nomination each at the Satellite, Saturn, Screen Actors Guild, NME (won), Grammy, MTV and Teen Choice awards. Wright won the Audience Award for Best Director at the South by Southwest film festival in March 2017, when the film was screened first for public viewing.

== Potential sequel ==
The success of Baby Driver spurred speculation in the media about a sequel beginning in December 2017. Wright started drafting a screenplay in January 2019, which introduced new characters to advance the story, and a finished draft had been shown to Elgort under a tentative working title that July. The director conceived three drafts by January 2021. Wright has since produced a completed script, but, as of 2025, factors such as funding have stalled development of a sequel.

== See also ==
- Heist film
- List of films featuring the deaf and hard of hearing
