= Te Acordarás de Mí (Eiza González song) =

2012 single by Eiza González

"Te acordarás de mí"

Single by Eiza González

from the album Te Acordarás de Mí
- Released: April 16, 2012 (Mexico); May 22, 2012 (United States)
- Genre: Pop; Latin pop
- Length: 3:09 (album version)
- Label: EMI Televisa; Capitol Latin
- Songwriter(s): Eiza González; Alejandra Alberti; Carlos Lara

Eiza González singles chronology
"Mi Destino Soy Yo" (2009)	"Te acordarás de mí" (00000003)	"Invisible" (2012)

"Te acordarás de mí" (in English: "You Will Remember Me") is the lead single by Mexican actress and singer Eiza González from her second album, Te Acordarás de Mí. The song was co-written by Eiza and songwriters, Alejandra Alberti and Carlos Lara in Mexico City. It was released in Mexico for digital download on iTunes for Mexico on April 16, 2012 and released in the United States on May 22, 2012.

== Music video ==
The official music video for "Te Acordarás de Mí" was filmed in Mexico City and directed by Gerald Mates. The music video premiered on April 30, 2012 on Eiza's official Vevo channel.

== Track listing ==
Official single

1. "Te acordarás de mí" (album version) – 3:14

== Charts ==
Chart (2012)	Peak position
Mexican Airplay Chart (Billboard International)	24
