= List of accolades received by Baby Driver =

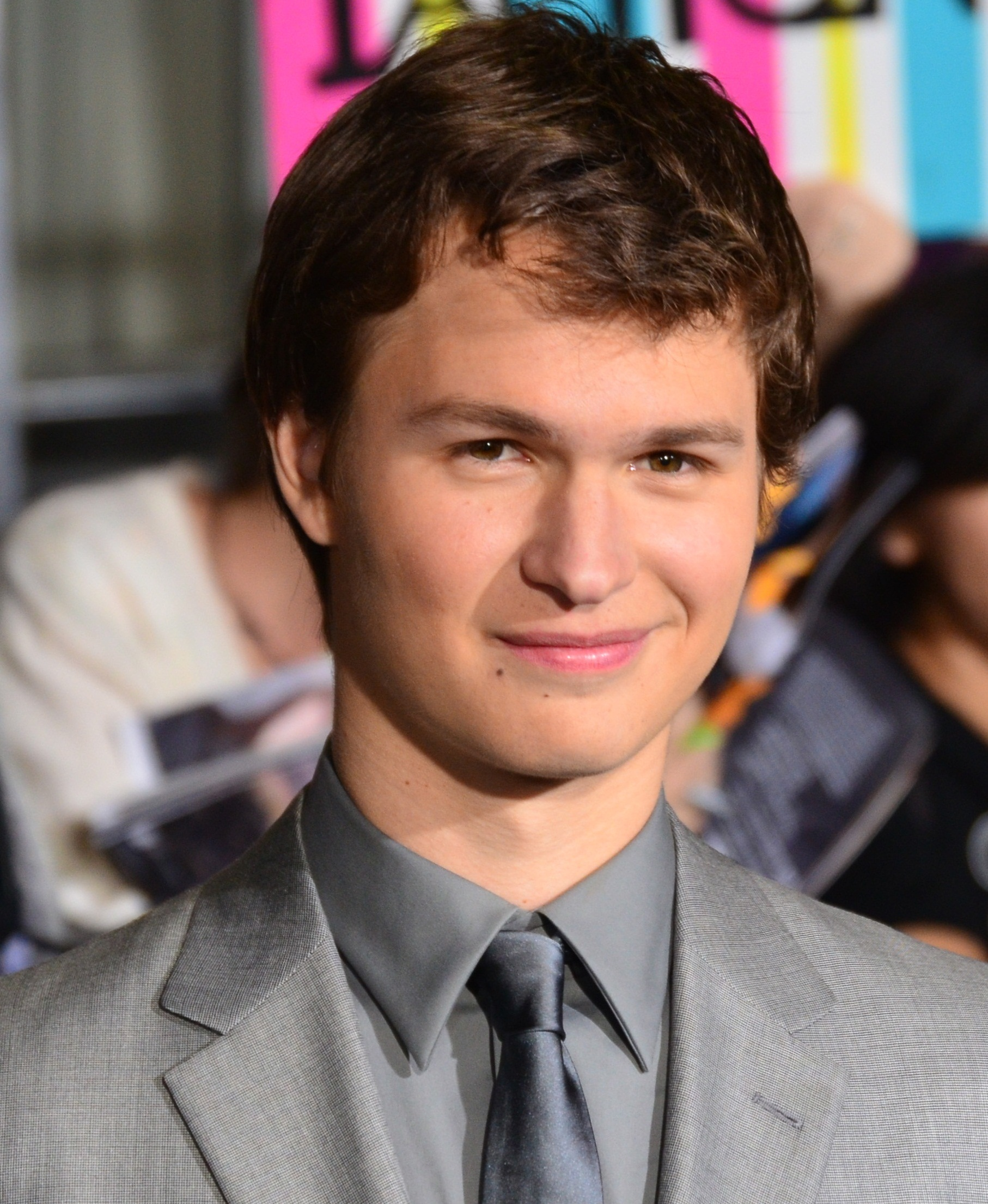
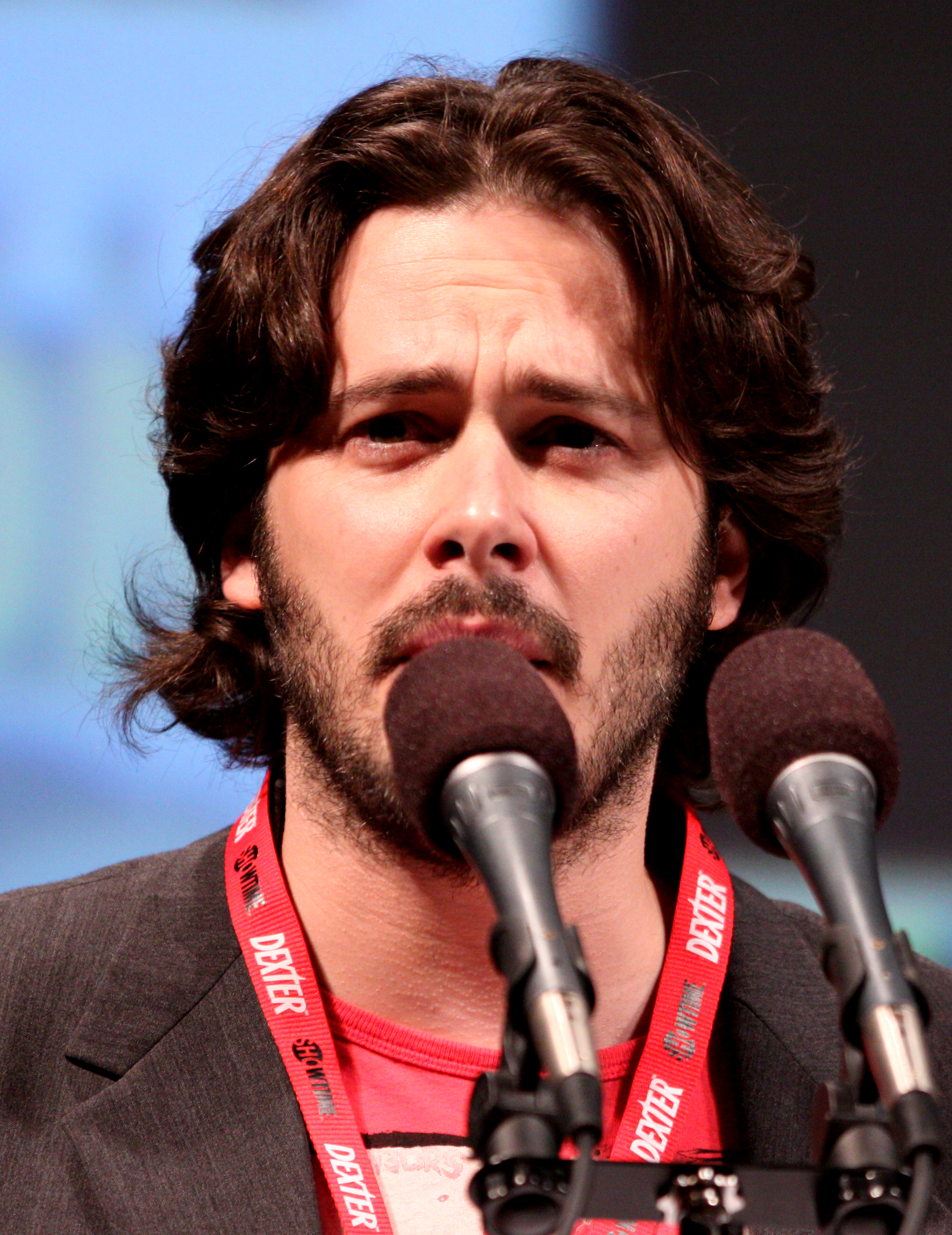
- Ansel Elgort (left) and Edgar Wright (right), received several accolades and nominations for the performances, writing and direction, respectively.
Accolades
Award	Wins	Nominations
Academy Awards	0	3
Alliance of Women Film Journalists	0	1
American Cinema Editors Awards	0	1
Black Reel Awards	0	1
British Academy Film Awards	1	2
Casting Society of America	0	1
Chicago Film Critics Association	1	1
Cinema Audio Society Awards	0	1
Costume Designers Guild Awards	1	1
Critics' Choice Movie Awards	1	2
Detroit Film Critics Society	1	1
Empire Awards	2	5
Georgia Film Critics Association	1	3
Golden Globe Awards	0	1
Golden Reel Awards	0	3
Golden Trailer Awards	3	9
Grammy Awards	0	1
Houston Film Critics Society	0	1
Location Managers Guild Awards	2	2
London Film Critics' Circle	0	1
Make-Up Artists and Hair Stylists Guild	0	1
MTV Movie & TV Awards	0	1
National Board of Review	1	1
New York Film Critics Online	1	1
NME Awards	1	1
Online Film Critics Society	1	1
San Diego Film Critics Society	2	2
San Francisco Bay Area Film Critics Circle	2	2
Satellite Awards	0	1
Saturn Awards	0	1
Screen Actors Guild Awards	0	1
Seattle Film Critics Society	0	1
St. Louis Film Critics Association	3	3
Society of Camera Operators	1	1
SXSW Film Festival	1	1
Teen Choice Awards	0	1
Taurus World Stunt Awards	1	1
Washington D.C. Area Film Critics Association	0	7
Young Artist Awards	0	1

Totals (Note: Certain award groups do not simply award one winner. They acknowledge several different recipients, have runners-up, and have third place. Since this is a specific recognition and is different from losing an award, runner-up mentions are considered wins in this award tally. For simplification and to avoid errors, each award in this list has been presumed to have had a prior nomination.)
- Wins: 40
- Nominations: 51

Baby Driver is a 2017 action film written and directed by Edgar Wright. It is jointly produced by Working Title Films and Big Talk Productions, with Sony and TriStar Pictures handling the commercial distribution of the film, and is financed through a co-production pact between TriStar and MRC and tax subsidies from the Georgia state government. Starring Ansel Elgort and Lily James, the film also features Kevin Spacey, Jon Hamm, Eiza González, Jamie Foxx and Jon Bernthal in supporting roles. Elgort plays the titular character, Baby, a getaway driver who seeks freedom from a life of crime with his girlfriend Debora.

Baby Driver premiered at the South by Southwest festival on March 11, 2017, and was released in North America and the United Kingdom on June 28. It was well received by the media for its craftsmanship and style However, the characterization and screenwriting drew occasional criticism. The National Board of Review selected Baby Driver as one of the top films of the year. It earned $226 million globally, bolstered by positive word-of-mouth support and flagging interest in blockbuster franchises, thereby becoming Wright's highest-grossing film to date. The TriStar–Media Rights Capital partnership recouped their budget with a $51.5 million net profit, factoring in marketing costs and other expenses.

Baby Driver was nominated for numerous awards, chiefly for writing and technical achievement, including three Academy Awards, two BAFTA Film Awards (with a win for Editing), two Critics' Choice Awards (again, with a win for Editing), and a Golden Globe Award. In addition, the film received five nominations for Empire Awards (winning two) and one nomination each at the Satellite, Saturn, Screen Actors Guild, NME (won), Grammy, MTV and Teen Choice awards, among others.

== Accolades ==
Award	Date of ceremony	Category	Recipient(s)	Result	Ref.
Academy Awards	March 4, 2018	Best Film Editing	Paul Machliss and Jonathan Amos	Nominated	
Academy Awards	March 4, 2018	Best Sound Editing	Julian Slater	Nominated	
Academy Awards	March 4, 2018	Best Sound Mixing	Tim Cavagin, Mary H. Ellis and Julian Slater	Nominated	
Alliance of Women Film Journalists	January 9, 2018	Best Editing	Paul Machliss and Jonathan Amos	Nominated	
American Cinema Editors	January 26, 2018	Best Edited Feature Film – Comedy or Musical	Paul Machliss and Jonathan Amos	Nominated	
Black Reel Awards	February 23, 2018	Best Supporting Actor	Jamie Foxx	Nominated	
British Academy Film Awards	February 18, 2018	Best Editing	Paul Machliss and Jonathan Amos	Won	
British Academy Film Awards	February 18, 2018	Best Sound	Tim Cavagin, Mary H. Ellis and Julian Slater	Nominated	
Casting Society of America	January 18, 2018	Big Budget – Drama	Francine Maisler and Meagan Lewis	Nominated	
Chicago Film Critics Association	December 12, 2017	Best Editing	Paul Machliss and Jonathan Amos	Won	
Cinema Audio Society Awards	February 24, 2018	Motion Picture – Live Action	Mark Appleby, Tim Cavagin, Gareth Cousins, Mary H. Ellis, Glen Gathard and Julian Slater	Nominated	
Critics' Choice Movie Awards	January 11, 2018	Best Editing	Paul Machliss and Jonathan Amos	Won	
Critics' Choice Movie Awards	January 11, 2018	Best Action Movie	Baby Driver	Nominated	
Detroit Film Critics Society	December 7, 2017	Best Use of Music	Baby Driver	Won	
Empire Awards	March 18, 2018	Best Director	Edgar Wright	Nominated	
Empire Awards	March 18, 2018	Best Male Newcomer	Ansel Elgort	Nominated	
Empire Awards	March 18, 2018	Best Thriller	Baby Driver	Nominated	
Empire Awards	March 18, 2018	Best Production Design	Baby Driver	Won	
Empire Awards	March 18, 2018	Best Soundtrack	Baby Driver	Won	
Georgia Film Critics Association	January 12, 2018	Best Film	Baby Driver	Nominated	
Georgia Film Critics Association	January 12, 2018	Best Director	Edgar Wright	Nominated	
Georgia Film Critics Association	January 12, 2018	Oglethorpe Award for Excellence in Georgia Cinema	Edgar Wright	Won	
Golden Globe Awards	January 7, 2018	Best Actor – Motion Picture Musical or Comedy	Ansel Elgort	Nominated	
Golden Reel Awards	February 18, 2018	Outstanding Achievement in Sound Editing – Music Score	Julian Slater and Bradley Farmer	Nominated	
Golden Reel Awards	February 18, 2018	Outstanding Achievement in Sound Editing – Dialogue / ADR	Julian Slater and Dan Morgan	Nominated	
Golden Reel Awards	February 18, 2018	Outstanding Achievement in Sound Editing – Effects / Foley	Julian Slater, Jeremy Price, Martin Cantwell, Arthur Graley, Rown Watson, Peter Hanson, Zoe Freed and Peter Burgis	Nominated	
Golden Trailer Awards	June 7, 2017	Best Motion/Title Graphics	Baby Driver	Nominated	
Golden Trailer Awards	June 7, 2017	Best Action	Baby Driver	Won	
Golden Trailer Awards	May 31, 2018	Most Original Trailer	Baby Driver	Nominated	
Golden Trailer Awards	May 31, 2018	Best Motion/Title Graphics	Baby Driver	Nominated	
Golden Trailer Awards	May 31, 2018	Best Music	Baby Driver	Won	
Golden Trailer Awards	May 31, 2018	Best Sound Editing	Baby Driver	Nominated	
Golden Trailer Awards	May 31, 2018	Best Sound Editing in a TV Spot	Baby Driver	Nominated	
Grammy Awards	January 29, 2018	Best Compilation Soundtrack for Visual Media	Baby Driver	Nominated	
Location Managers Guild Awards	April 7, 2018	Outstanding Locations in Contemporary Film	Doug Dresser, Kyle Hinshaw	Won	
Location Managers Guild Awards	April 7, 2018	Outstanding Film Commission	Atlanta Mayor's Office of Film & Entertainment	Won	
London Film Critics' Circle	January 28, 2018	Technical Achievement Award	Darrin Prescott (stunts)	Nominated	
Make-Up Artists and Hair Stylists Guild	February 24, 2018	Feature Motion Picture: Best Contemporary Makeup	Fionagh Cush and Phyllis Temple	Nominated	
MTV Movie & TV Awards	June 19, 2018	Best Actor in a Movie	Ansel Elgort	Nominated	
National Board of Review	January 4, 2018	Top Ten Films	Baby Driver	Won	
New York Film Critics Online	December 10, 2017	Best Use of Music	Baby Driver	Won	
NME Awards	February 14, 2018	Best Film	Baby Driver	Won	
Online Film Critics Society	December 28, 2017	Best Editing	Paul Machliss and Jonathan Amos	Runner-up	
San Diego Film Critics Society	December 11, 2017	Best Editing	Paul Machliss and Jonathan Amos	Won	
San Diego Film Critics Society	December 11, 2017	Best Use of Music	Baby Driver	Won	
San Francisco Film Critics Circle Awards	December 10, 2017	Best Film Editing	Paul Machliss and Jonathan Amos	Won	
Satellite Awards	February 10, 2018	Best Film Editing	Paul Machliss and Jonathan Amos	Nominated	
Saturn Awards	June 27, 2018	Best Action or Adventure Film	Baby Driver	Nominated	
Screen Actors Guild Awards	January 21, 2018	Outstanding Performance by a Stunt Ensemble in a Motion Picture	Baby Driver	Nominated	
Seattle Film Critics Society	December 18, 2017	Best Editing	Paul Machliss and Jonathan Amos	Nominated	
Society of Camera Operators	February 1, 2018	Camera Operator of the Year	Roberto De Angelis	Won	
St. Louis Film Critics Association	December 17, 2017	Best Editing	Paul Machliss and Jonathan Amos	Won	
St. Louis Film Critics Association	December 17, 2017	Best Soundtrack	Baby Driver	Won	
St. Louis Film Critics Association	December 17, 2017	Best Scene	Baby goes for coffee (opening credits)	Runner-up	
SXSW Film Festival	March 11, 2017	Audience Award for Best Director	Edgar Wright	Won	
Teen Choice Awards	August 13, 2017	Choice Summer Movie Actor	Ansel Elgort	Nominated	
Taurus World Stunt Awards	May 12, 2018	Best Work with a Vehicle	Baby Driver	Won	
Washington D.C. Area Film Critics Association	December 8, 2017	Best Editing	Paul Machliss and Jonathan Amos	Won	
Young Artist Awards	July 14, 2018	Best Performance in a Feature Film – Supporting Young Actor	Brogan Hall	Nominated	
