= Marjorie Stewart (disambiguation) =

Marjorie Stewart was a British actress and a member of the Special Operations Executive during World War II

Marjorie Stewart may also refer to:

- Marjorie Joyner, née Stewart, American businesswoman and hair care entrepreneur
- Margie Stewart, official United States Army poster girl during World War II
