= Te Acordarás de Mí (Eiza González album) =

Studio album by Eiza González
- Released: June 5, 2012
- Recorded: 2011–2012 in Los Angeles, California, Sonic Ranch studio in Tornillo, Texas, Mexico City, and the Dominican Republic
- Genres: Latin pop; electropop; dance-pop
- Length: 42:25
- Labels: EMI Televisa; Capitol Latin
- Producers: Ettore Grenci; Carolina Rosas

Eiza González chronology
Contracorriente (2009)	Te Acordarás de Mí (2012)

Singles from Te Acordarás de Mí
- 1. "Te Acordarás de Mí" Released: April 16, 2012; 2. "Invisible" Released: August 1, 2012

Te Acordarás de Mí (English: You Will Remember Me) is the second and final studio album by Mexican singer and actress Eiza González. It was released digitally on June 5, 2012 through EMI Televisa Music and Capitol Latin in the US. On June 12, 2012, the album was available in physical and digital format in South America. González recorded the album in Los Angeles, California, at Sonic Studios in Tornillo, Texas, the Dominican Republic and Mexico City during late 2011 and early 2012. The album was produced by Ettore Grenci.

== Background ==
In June 2011, Eiza announced to fans via Twitter that production had begun on her second studio album. She spent the remainder of the year writing and recording her album and revealed that she would not return to television or film roles until production on the album was complete. González stated that her second album would differ drastically from her 2009 debut album, Contracorriente. For her new album, González revealed that she wanted to find her sound and explore different musical genres. The album includes pop, dance songs, as well as electronic with mariachi influences. Her record label encouraged her to try songwriting and attend writing workshops. She was introduced to various songwriters who assisted her in composing songs for the album. Eiza and El Cata collaborated on the song, "Mentiroso", which was recorded in the Dominican Republic. González co-wrote three songs on the album: "Te Acordarás de Mí", "Cómo Sigo Viviendo", and "Quiero Que Seas Tú". The song, "Cómo Sigo Viviendo", was written as homeaje to Eiza's late father, who died when she was 12 years old.

== Promotion ==
=== Singles ===
"Te Acordarás de Mí" is the album's lead single. González co-wrote the song in Mexico City with songwriters Carlos Lara and Alejandra Alberti. The music video was filmed in Mexico City by Spanish director, Gerard Mates. It premiered on Eiza's official Vevo channel on April 30, 2012.

== Chart performance ==
The album debuted on the México Top 100 Albums chart at number 66.

== Release history ==
Country	Date	Label	Format(s)
United States	June 5, 2012	Capitol Latin	CD; digital download
Mexico and Latin America	June 12, 2012	EMI Televisa	CD (Mexico only); digital download

== Track listings ==
#	Title	Time
1.	"Te Acordarás de Mí"	3:09
2.	"Grosero"	2:47
3.	"Quiero Que Seas Tú"	3:46
4.	"Dos Filos"	3:41
5.	"Frío"	3:37
6.	"Solo Tú"	3:31
7.	"La Playa"	3:31
8.	"Invisible"	3:41
9.	"El Beat"	3:27
10.	"Te Vas"	3:43
11.	"Cómo Sigo Viviendo"	4:14
12.	"Mentiroso" (featuring El Cata)	3:18

== Charts ==
Chart	Peak position
México Top 100 Albums	66
U.S. Billboard Latin Pop Album	14
