= Little Big Shot =

Little Big Shot may refer to:

- Little Big Shot (1935 film), an American film
- Little Big Shot (1952 film), a British comedy crime film

== See also ==
- Little Big Shots, an American variety television series
