= Click track =

Audio cues used for timing

120 bpm click track
Example of a basic 4/4, 120 bpm click track

A click track is a series of audio cues used to synchronize sound recordings, sometimes for synchronization to a moving image. The click track originated in early sound movies, where optical marks were made on the film to indicate precise timings for musical accompaniment. It can also serve a purpose similar to a metronome, as in the music industry, where it is often used during recording sessions and live performances.

== History ==
The earliest known usage of "precise timing-aid" in movies may have been by Walt Disney’s team when recording music and sound effects for their early cartoons. Since cartoons at that time did not include dialogue, the jokes onscreen relied heavily on how precisely they were synchronized with the sound effects (e.g., one character hitting another with a frying pan is funniest when it occurs simultaneously with the "boing" sound effect). When the timing is bad, the joke loses significant impact. Wilfred Jackson, who made the music for Steamboat Willie in 1928, simply used a metronome to set the precise speed of the music for scenes:

What I worked out, was a bar sheet (or dope sheet), to indicate measures of music. It wasn't like a score, because it didn't have five barlines; it had a little square for each beat in each measure, and it had an indication of the tempo. The frames were in the beat of the music; so in twelve-frame, or sixteen-frame, or whatever. That way, we were able to synchronise the scenes, which were shot separately, of course. My contribution to sound-cartoons was that I knew what a metronome was.

This system evolved with use. The Disney team experimented with additional graphical symbols, to better show the performing musicians when to expect happenings. This system was used well into the 1930s, when the first multitrack recording machine was built and dubbing became possible.

The click track was sufficiently useful as a synchronization tool that it became part of standard recording technology, whether for films, radio or other sound recording and the click track was applied to one of the tracks on a multitrack tape recorder. By the late 20th century, particularly in the realm of sound synthesizers and digital recording, the click track became computerized and synchronizing different instruments became more complex, whereupon the click track was largely supplanted by a SMPTE timecode.

Click tracks were also once very important in the creation of accurately timed music such as radio and television spots (commercials) and other timed production music. In this type of use a rhythm section or ensemble would play all instruments to a click track. With the use of MIDI sequencing in the 1980s and 1990s it became possible to build an entire music track that was accurately timed without depending solely on a click track. Computer based MIDI sequencing programs are still used in the creation of music. The MIDI sequencer generated track can be used with only MIDI controlled instruments or embellished with other instruments played by musicians. The musicians who embellish the tracks created with MIDI sequencer essentially play along with the already timed piece of music. In many cases all of the MIDI instrumentation is replaced by actual musicians.

== Techniques ==
Subdivided 50 bpm click track
Example of a subdivided 4/4, 50 bpm click track

The click track may be used as a form of metronome directly by musicians in the studio or on stage, particularly by drummers, who listen via headphones to maintain a consistent beat. Sometimes the click track would be given, through a set of headphones, only to the drummer who would hold the beat, and the rest of the musicians on staff would follow along to the beat that the drummer would hold. One can think of a click track as essentially being a kind of metronome except that it is fed through headphones to one or more of the musicians during a recording or performance. It is also not uncommon for musicians or engineers to subdivide click tracks at slow tempos (for instance, below 70 BPM) into smaller parts, with, for instance a click on the start of a bar and a beep on every individual quarter (or eighth, sixteenth...) note. In the final product of the film or performance that is being recorded, the click track is not heard by the audience.

The practice of recording using an aiding click track is contrary to the practice of using a metronome during practice and then turning it off come time for a performance or recording, which has traditionally been more common in the past. The use of a click track allows for easier editing in a digital audio workstation (DAW) or music sequencer, since various parts can be easily quantized and moved around or spliced together without worrying about minute differences in timing. Click tracks are especially useful to modern "one man bands" who may use a multi-track audio editor to perform all or many of the different parts of a recording separately.

Click tracks can also aid live bands that want to synchronize a live performance with things like prerecorded backing tracks, pyrotechnics and stage lighting.

== Criticisms ==
Use of a click track without a tempo map does not allow a natural shifting of tempo that would be vital for expressive phrasing and instances of fermata, accelerando, ritardando, etc.

James Beament, a scientist who studied acoustics, stated:

And many recent recordings of pop music demonstrate how music is killed by a metronome for they are as square as a draftsman's T. For the convenience of recording engineers, each player has to record their part on a separate track while listening to a click track – a metronome – and the clicks are then used to synchronize the tracks while the technicians adjust them to their taste and mix them. I know talented young musicians who can't do it; we can understand why. Nothing compares with a recording of a live performance in which the players provide each other with the time-framework. ... if you want to kill a musical performance, give the player a click track!

— James Beament; How we hear music: the relationship between music and the hearing mechanism

Mark E. Smith, vocalist and leader of the UK musical group The Fall, was known to forbid use of click tracks in the recording studio. Simon Wolstencroft, drummer for The Fall in the 1980s and '90s, stated "[Smith] hated it if the drums became too slick" by synchronizing with a click track.

== See also ==
- Metronome
