= The Ministry of Ungentlemanly Warfare =

2024 film by Guy Ritchie

- Theatrical release poster
- Directed by: Guy Ritchie
- Screenplay by: Paul Tamasy; Eric Johnson; Arash Amel; Guy Ritchie
- Based on: Churchill's Secret Warriors: The Explosive True Story of the Special Forces Desperadoes of WWII by Damien Lewis
- Produced by: Jerry Bruckheimer; Guy Ritchie; Chad Oman; Ivan Atkinson; John Friedberg
- Starring: Henry Cavill; Eiza González; Alan Ritchson; Alex Pettyfer; Hero Fiennes Tiffin; Babs Olusanmokun; Henrique Zaga; Til Schweiger; Henry Golding; Cary Elwes
- Cinematography: Ed Wild
- Edited by: James Herbert
- Music by: Christopher Benstead
- Production companies: Black Bear Pictures; Jerry Bruckheimer Films; Toff Guy Films
- Distributed by: Lionsgate (United States); Amazon MGM Studios (United Kingdom)
- Release dates: April 13, 2024 (New York City); April 19, 2024 (United States); July 25, 2024 (United Kingdom)
- Running time: 122 minutes
- Countries: United Kingdom; United States
- Language: English
- Budget: $60 million
- Box office: $29.8 million

The Ministry of Ungentlemanly Warfare is a 2024 war film directed, co-written and produced by Guy Ritchie, and starring Henry Cavill, Eiza González, Alan Ritchson, Henry Golding and Alex Pettyfer. Based on the 2014 book Churchill's Secret Warriors: The Explosive True Story of the Special Forces Desperadoes of WWII by Damien Lewis, the film portrays a heavily fictionalised version of the role played by Winston Churchill's Special Operations Executive in Operation Postmaster.

The Ministry of Ungentlemanly Warfare had its premiere on April 13, 2024, in New York, and was released in the United States on April 19, 2024 by Lionsgate. The film received mostly positive reviews and grossed $29.8 million theatrically against a $60 million budget.

== Plot ==
In late 1941, during World War II, the United Kingdom struggles to halt Nazi Germany's attempts to take over Europe, with London regularly bombed by the Luftwaffe and supply and aid ships constantly sunk by German submarines. Brigadier Colin Gubbins initiates Operation Postmaster, a covert sabotage mission to disrupt U-boat resupply operations on Spanish-controlled Fernando Po. SOE agents Marjorie Stewart and Richard Heron depart by train while Gubbins enlists Gus March-Phillipps to assemble a ground team to destroy the Italian supply ship Duchessa d'Aosta and two tugboats.

Gus and his allies Henry Hayes, Freddy Alvarez, and Danish Army officer Anders Lassen sail to Fernando Po on the neutral Swedish fishing trawler Maid Honour. They divert to a German-controlled section of La Palma to rescue SOE saboteur Geoffrey Appleyard from the Gestapo. Gubbins had sent Appleyard ahead hoping Gus would want him on the team. Marjorie and Heron use an 'illegal' gambling hall on Fernando Po to recruit backup for Gus's team. Marjorie charms Heinrich Luhr, the SS commander in charge. Learning that the Duchessa intends to depart three days early, Gus sails through a British naval blockade of Nazi-occupied West Africa knowing they'll be arrested if their unauthorised mission is discovered.

Marjorie and Heron learn that Luhr has had the Duchessa's hull reinforced despite the Italian attache's reservations. Gus and Appleyard decide their best course of action is to hijack the ships and use them for barter after a mole in Gubbins's staff reveals the mission to senior command. Luhr catches on to Marjorie when her act begins to 'slip' but the raid is successful, and Marjorie shoots Luhr in the head. Delivering the boats to a British fleet outside Lagos, the team is arrested. They are spared court-martial when Winston Churchill adds them to his 'Ministry of Ungentlemanly Warfare'.

A montage before the end credits reveal the later activities of several protagonists: Gus became a war hero helming similar raids and married Marjorie at the start of her acting career; Appleyard received commendations for his role in the mission, much to the king's amusement; Hayes became an accomplished spy notable for surviving a year of Nazi torture without breaking; Lassen took part in raids outside the group until his death in 1945; Ian Fleming, part of Gubbins's inner circle, used Operation Postmaster as inspiration for his James Bond novels.

== Cast ==
- Henry Cavill as Gus March-Phillipps
- Alan Ritchson as Anders Lassen
- Alex Pettyfer as Geoffrey Appleyard
- Eiza González as Marjorie Stewart
- Babs Olusanmokun as Heron
- Cary Elwes as Brigadier Gubbins 'M'
- Hero Fiennes Tiffin as Henry Hayes
- Henry Golding as Freddy Alvarez
- Rory Kinnear as Churchill
- Til Schweiger as Heinrich Luhr
- Freddie Fox as Ian Fleming
- Henrique Zaga as Captain Binea
- Danny Sapani as Kambili Kalu

== Production ==
Paramount Pictures acquired the rights to Damien Lewis's book, The Ministry of Ungentlemanly Warfare: How Churchill's Secret Warriors Set Europe Ablaze and Gave Birth to Modern Black Ops, in 2015. Guy Ritchie signed on to direct the project in February 2021, from a script by Arash Amel, with Jerry Bruckheimer producing the film. In October 2022, Henry Cavill and Eiza González were set to star, with Black Bear Pictures co-financing the film and handling sales through Black Bear International with Paramount no longer involved. In February 2023, additional casting including Alan Ritchson, Henry Golding, Alex Pettyfer and Cary Elwes was announced.

Principal photography began on February 13, 2023, in Antalya, Turkey, and wrapped up in April 2023. The day filming began, it was announced Lionsgate had acquired U.S. distribution rights to the film, planning to give it a wide release in 2024; Amazon Prime Video also acquired distribution rights to the film for Europe, Latin America, Australia, New Zealand, Canada, South Africa, India, and pan-Asian pay television. Media Capital Technologies was involved in the co-financing of the film.

== Release ==
The Ministry of Ungentlemanly Warfare had its premiere on April 13, 2024, in New York and was released in the United States on April 19, 2024, by Lionsgate. It was released on premium video on demand services on May 10, 2024. It was later released on DVD, Blu-ray and Ultra HD Blu-ray on June 25, 2024 by Lionsgate Home Entertainment and internationally by Amazon Prime Video on July 25, 2024. The movie was nominated in 2025 on Saturn Awards.

== Reception ==
=== Box office ===
In the United States, The Ministry of Ungentlemanly Warfare was released alongside Abigail and Spy × Family Code: White, and was projected to gross $5–8 million from 2,845 theaters in its opening weekend. The film made $3.7 million on its first day, including $1.45 million from previews. It went on to debut to $9 million, finishing fourth behind Civil War, Abigail, and Godzilla x Kong: The New Empire. In its second weekend it dropped 57% to gross $3.86 million, finishing sixth.

=== Critical response ===
On the review aggregator website Rotten Tomatoes, 68% of 165 critics' reviews are positive, with an average rating of 6.1/10. The website's consensus reads: "Cranking up a true story of derring-do into a high-octane action flick that's heavy on spectacle if not suspense, The Ministry of Ungentlemanly Warfare is another solid entry into Guy Ritchie's pantheon." Metacritic, which uses a weighted average, assigned the film a score of 55 out of 100, based on 38 critics, indicating "mixed or average" reviews. Audiences surveyed by CinemaScore gave the film an average grade of "A−" on an A+ to F scale, while those polled by PostTrak gave it an 88% positive score.
