= Contracorriente =

Studio album by Eiza González
- Released: November 24, 2009
- Recorded: 2008–2009 in Los Angeles, California, Texas, and Mexico City
- Genre: Latin pop
- Length: 44:22
- Label: EMI Televisa

Eiza González chronology
Lola...Érase una vez (2007)	Contracorriente (2009)	Te Acordarás de Mí (2012)

Singles from Contracorriente
- 1. "Mi Destino Soy Yo" Released: August 20, 2009

Contracorriente (Countercurrent in English) is the debut solo album by Mexican singer and actress Eiza González. It was released on November 24, 2009, through EMI Televisa Music. The album was recorded in Los Angeles, California, Texas, and Mexico City during 2008 and early 2009.

== Promotion ==
=== Singles ===
"Mi Destino Soy Yo" is the first and only single from Contracorriente. The song was produced by Rafael Esparza-Ruiz and Luigi Gonzalez.

== Track listings ==
#	Title	Time
1.	"Impredecible"	3:31
2.	"¿Y Cómo Fue?"	3:43
3.	"Todavía"	4:03
4.	"Mi Destino Soy Yo"	3:15
5.	"Perdiéndolo Todo"	3:38
6.	"Dilo De Una Vez"	3:39
7.	"Caminaré"	3:29
8.	"La Vida Es Un Blues"	3:52
9.	"Quiéreme Bien"	4:16
10.	"Lo Que Ahora Soy"	3:31
11.	"Dulce Apariencia"	3:32
12.	"Dentro"	3:44

== Chart performance ==
=== Charts ===
Chart	Peak position
México Top 100 Albums	13

== Release history ==
Country	Date	Label	Format(s)
Mexico and Latin America	November 24, 2009	EMI Televisa	CD; digital download
United States	January 26, 2010	Capitol Latin	CD; digital download
