= Marjorie Frances Stewart =

British actress and spy (1912 - 1988)

Marjorie Frances Stewart Lady Marling
- Born: Marjorie Frances Esclair-Monde Stewart; 18 May 1912; Kensington, London, England
- Died: 9 November 1988 (aged 76)
- Occupations: Actress, intelligence operative
- Organization: Special Operations Executive
- Known for: Service in the SOE during World War II

Marjorie Frances Esclair-Monde Stewart (Lady Marling) (18 May 1912 – 9 November 1988) was a British actress and a member of the Special Operations Executive (SOE) during World War II.

== Background and Family ==
Marjorie Frances Esclair-Monde Stewart was born on 18 May 1912 in Kensington, London, England.

She was the daughter of Sir Francis Hugh Stewart, a colonial merchant based in Calcutta (now Kolkata) in British India, and Lady Frances Stewart. Marjorie was one of seven children in the family.

Her mother, Lady Frances Stewart, was active in social and political causes. She served as Honorary Secretary of the National Indian Association and was involved in advocacy related to Indian education and political reform during the late nineteenth and early twentieth centuries. Through her mother's work, Marjorie was exposed from an early age to international and political issues connected with British India. She made her theatrical debut at age five and continued to perform in various West End plays.

== World War II service ==
In 1939, Marjorie joined the Special Operations Executive (SOE). Initially employed as a lift operator, she quickly rose to the position of secretary to SOE Controller; Patrick Howarth. Historical records suggest her primary contributions were administrative, though she played a key role in planning operations and possibly training female spies. Her connection with Operation Postmaster was mainly behind-the-scenes, involved in strategic planning rather than direct action.

== Personal life ==
Marjorie met Gustavus Henry March-Phillipps during the war, and married him on 18 April 1942, shortly after Operation Postmaster. Subsequently, March-Phillipps was killed later that year, and Marjorie was left a widow. She gave birth to their daughter, Henrietta Sophia March-Phillipps, on June 15, 1943. After the war, she returned to her acting career and worked with at least 22 other productions. In November 1957 she married Major Sir John Stanley Vincent Marling, son of Sir Charles Murray Marling and Lucia Slade. Her married name became Marling.

== Acting career post-war ==
After leaving the SOE in 1946, Marjorie resumed her acting career, taking on small roles in various films through the 1950s, including Little Big Shot and The Lost King. Her acting career, while not as prominent as her early years, remained a significant part of her life until her retirement.

== Filmography ==
=== Film ===
- Little Big Shot (1952) as Mrs. Crane
- The Master Plan (1954) as Yvonne Goulding
- Young and Willing (1954) as Prisoner
- The Woman for Joe (1955) as Gown Shop Saleswoman (uncredited)

=== Television ===
- BBC Sunday-Night Theatre (1953–1955), various roles
- Lilli Palmer Theatre (1956) as Susan Baxter
- ITV Play of the Week (1957–1958), various roles
- The Lost King (1958) as Duchess de Castillon-Fouquieres
- Virtuoso (1959) as Mary Creston
- No Hiding Place (1960) as Margaret Fitch

== Death ==
Marjorie died on 9 November 1988 at age 76 in Kensington, Middlesex, England . According to available biographical records, she died after an illness (reported as cancer).

== Popular culture ==
In the 2024 film The Ministry of Ungentlemanly Warfare, Marjorie is portrayed by Eiza González. The film, while taking considerable creative liberties, highlights the often-overlooked roles of women in wartime espionage. Many aspects of her portrayal are fictionalised, including her direct participation in field operations and her depicted marksmanship skills.
