= Little Big Shot (1952 film) =

- Directed by: Jack Raymond
- Written by: John Paddy Carstairs; Jack Marks
- Based on: the play Little Big Shot by Janet Allan
- Produced by: Henry Halstead
- Starring: Ronald Shiner; Marie Löhr; Derek Farr
- Cinematography: James Wilson
- Edited by: Helen Wiggins
- Music by: Tony Lowry
- Production company: Byron Films
- Distributed by: Associated British-Pathé
- Release date: 28 July 1952
- Running time: 89 minutes
- Country: United Kingdom
- Language: English

Little Big Shot is a 1952 British comedy crime film by Jack Raymond, and starring Ronald Shiner, Marie Löhr, and Derek Farr. It was produced by Henry Halsted's Byron Film and distributed by Associated British. It was the final film of Raymond, who had begun his career in the silent era.

== Plot summary ==
Henry Hawkwood, the bumbling son of a recently deceased crime boss, does his best to follow in his father's footsteps, but to little avail. In the end, he accidentally switches sides and helps to bring in the crooks.

== Cast ==
- Ronald Shiner as Henry Hawkwood
- Marie Löhr as Mrs. Maddox
- Derek Farr as Det. Sgt. Wilson
- Yvette Wyatt as Ann
- Digby Wolfe as Peter Carton
- Marjorie Stewart as Miss Crane
- Manning Whiley as Mike Connor
- Danny Green as Big Mo
- Victor Baring as Little Mo
- Cyril Conway as Tony Vapini

== Production ==
The film's sets were designed by the art director Wilfred Arnold.

The movie was known as Treble Chance and filming began February 1952.

== Critical reception ==
The Monthly Film Bulletin wrote: " A farce with poor script, hack direction and Marie Lohr unfairly miscast. The imbecilic policeman played by Derek Farr is conceived on a childish comic level. Ronald Shiner performs as energetically as ever, but no amount of energy could compensate for the defects of this poverty-stricken production."

Kine Weekly wrote: "The picture introduces an elaborate American gangster dream sequence, but despite this ambitious innovation it's dead of real wit. Ronald Shiner never relaxes, and, though more effective in battledress, makes the most of his lines and neatly improvies as Harry. Derek Farr, too, turns in an amusing study as Inspector Wilson, but the rest are little more than stoeges, Simple fare for simple folk just about sums up the artless joke."

Picture Show wrote: "Ronald Shiner works hard to get the utmost comedy out of this role."

Picturegoer wrote: "What a disappointment! After the previous Shiner successes, Worm's Eye View and Reluctant Heroes, up comes this laboured crook-comedy, which has more backchat than action. It ambles along in a dilatory manner with a laugh here and there but no sustained interest. Perhaps the real trouble is that Ronald Shiner, cast here as the tender-hearted son of a successful crook who is determined to follow in his father's footsteps – or fingerprints – has a very vague character part. ... It all dissolves into custard-pie knockabout. Derek Farr does quite well as a rather dullwitted inspector, but Manning Whiley, as the chief crook, has little chance to show his acting paces."

Sky Movies noted: "Another reminder of how much the world of British comedy has missed the abrasive cockney wit of Ronald Shiner. Here, he plays the soft-hearted son of a famous crook who tries to emulate his father. Alas, he's too nice to be a criminal, and the gang only keep him out of respect for his old man. Digby Wolfe, once a familiar television face on panel games and reviews, and later creator of Laugh-In, scores as an impecunious journalist ever on the look-out for a scoop."
