= Terri White (journalist) =

British journalist, editor and author

Terri White (born 1979) is a British journalist, editor and author. She was the editor-in-chief of Empire magazine and is author of a memoir Coming Undone.

== Biography ==
White was born in 1979 in Inkersall near Chesterfield in Derbyshire. She graduated with a degree in English literature from Leicester University and worked in magazine publishing in London before moving to New York City in 2012. She was editor of Life & Style and then, at the end of 2013, became editor-in-chief of Time Out New York.

In 2015, she returned to London when offered the post of editor of Empire magazine. While she had been pursuing a successful career in New York, White had turned to alcohol and prescription drugs and spent a week in a psychiatric ward. She described how her life unravelled in New York in a 2020 memoir, Coming Undone, which also contained details of poverty and abuse in childhood.

In September 2021, White resigned from her post at Empire as the long hours were incompatible with her role as a new mother. Since then she has worked as a freelance journalist.

== Personal life ==
White has a son, born in 2020.

== Awards ==
White was named men's magazine editor of the year by the British Society of Magazine Editors in 2009 and new editor of the year by the Periodical Training Council in 2010 when she was working for ShortList magazine. She is a fellow of the Royal Society for Arts.

== Selected works ==
- Coming Undone (2020, Canongate Books).
