= Eiza González =

Mexican actress and singer (born 1990)

- González in 2026
- Born: Eiza González Reyna; 30 January 1990 (age 36); Mexico City, Mexico
- Occupations: Actress; singer
- Years active: 2007–present

Eiza González Reyna (born 30 January 1990) is a Mexican actress and singer. She gained popularity for starring in the Nickelodeon teen sitcom Sueña conmigo (2010–2011). As a singer, she released the albums Contracorriente (2009) and Te Acordarás de Mí (2012).

González has since starred in the American horror series From Dusk till Dawn: The Series (2014–2016), and the action films Baby Driver (2017), Alita: Battle Angel (2019), Bloodshot (2020), and Ambulance (2022). In 2024, she starred in the science fiction series 3 Body Problem and the action-comedy film The Ministry of Ungentlemanly Warfare. In 2025, she starred in Flying Lotus' sci-fi horror film Ash.

== Early life and education ==
González was born on 30 January 1990 in Mexico City, Mexico. Her mother Glenda was a model. Her father died in a motorcycle accident when she was 12; she has cited her father's death as a strong influence on her career. She has one younger brother named Yulen.

She attended two private bilingual schools, Edron Academy and the American School Foundation, both located in Mexico City. She stayed in Trento, Italy, where she has relatives, for some time when she was around 10, to learn Italian.

From 2003 through 2004, González studied acting at the M&M Studio, an acting school in Mexico City run by actress Patricia Reyes Spíndola. She completed two years of a three-year course at Televisa's acting school, Centro de Educación Artística, before she was cast as the protagonist in the 2007 teen-oriented telenovela Lola...Érase una vez at the age of 16.

== Career ==
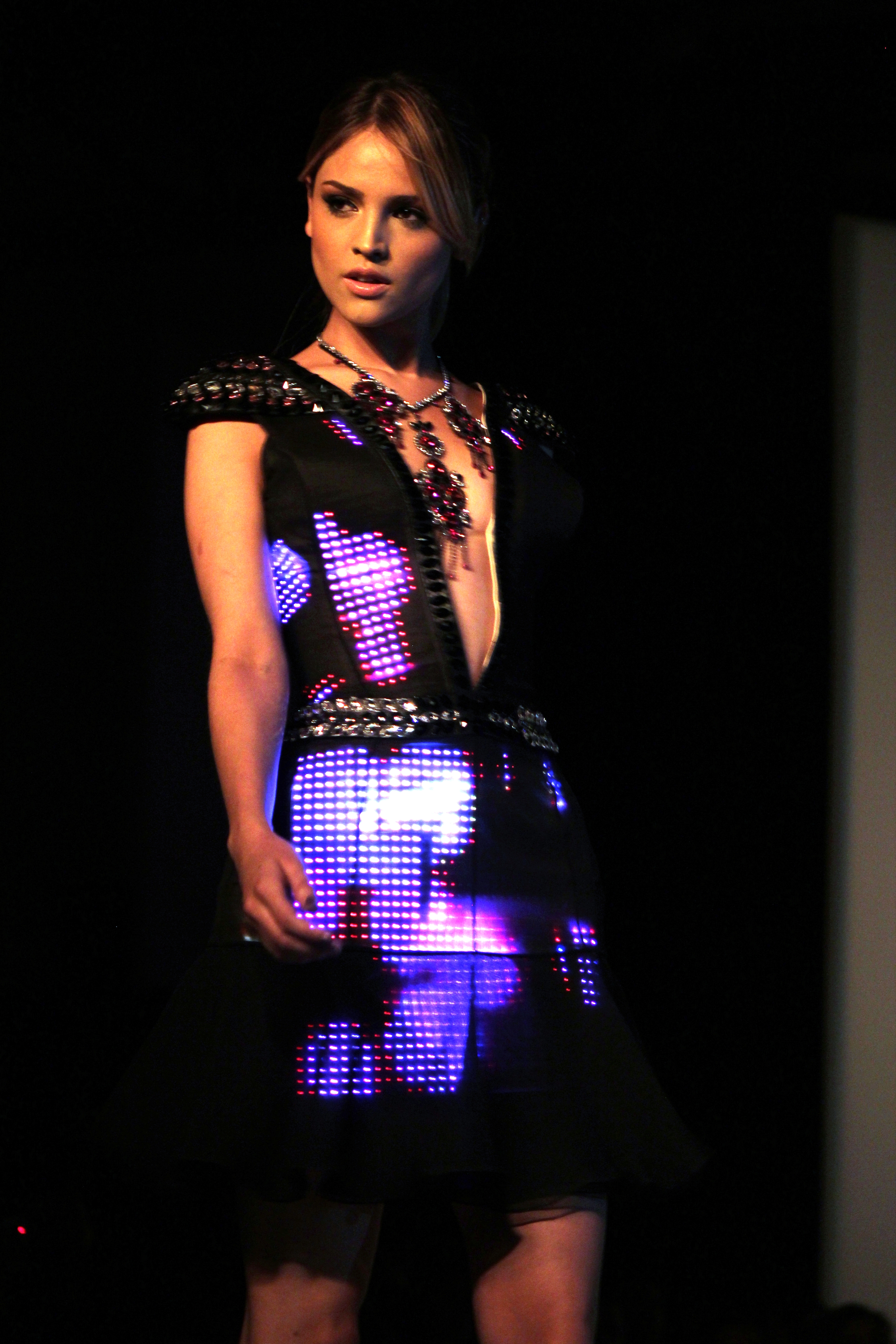
González made her television debut as Lola in Lola...Érase una vez. Years later, she starred in El Rey Network's From Dusk till Dawn: The Series.

While attending school, she was first spotted by producer and director Pedro Damián, best known for his success with Latin pop band RBD. Two years later, Damian cast González in a remake of Argentina's famous children's telenovela, Floricienta. She portrayed Lola Valente, the lead female protagonist in Lola, érase una vez. The show began filming in late 2006, and debuted in Mexico on 26 February 2007. It was later shown in various countries throughout Latin America and the United States. Following the completion of Lola, érase una vez, González, accompanied by her mother, moved to New York City briefly in the spring of 2008 to attend a three-month course of acting classes at the Lee Strasberg Theatre and Film Institute. She returned to Mexico City in early fall of that same year.

In April 2009, she was cast in an episode of the popular crime drama television series Mujeres Asesinas as a supporting character for the second season. She starred in the episode "Tere, Desconfiada", playing the teenage antagonist, Gaby. González has said that she was told about the casting call while she was preparing to release her first solo album Contracorriente.

In 2010, Nickelodeon announced that González would be starring in teen sitcom Sueña conmigo, where she played the characters of Clara Molina and Roxy Pop. For the role, González traveled to Buenos Aires to film in April 2010. She lived in Buenos Aires for a year, traveling back to Mexico City on breaks during the production of the series. When filming ended in February 2011, Gonzalez returned to Mexico City. The show was produced by Nickelodeon and Televisa, and aired on 20 July 2010 in Latin America and Europe. Because of its success in Argentina, the cast performed several concerts in cities in that country from March to July 2011.

In 2012, González filmed Casi 30, a comedy-drama directed by Alejandro Sugich. González plays Cristina, an 18-year-old ballet student who falls in love with Emilio, the film's lead character. The film marks González's acting debut in cinema. In 2013, the movie premiered at several film festivals in Mexico, but it premiered nationwide in Mexico on 22 August 2014.

In 2012, González starred in the Televisa series Amores verdaderos, a remake of the TV Azteca television series Amor en custodia. The show premiered on 3 September 2012. Originally, Mexican producer Pedro Torres offered González the lead role of Sofía López-Haro in his television show, Gossip Girl: Acapulco, the Mexican remake of the hit American television series, Gossip Girl. González considered accepting the role, but declined, due to her rigorous filming schedule for Amores verdaderos.

In late August 2013, González moved to Los Angeles to pursue her acting career. In September 2013, González was cast in director Adrian Cervantes' film, All Hail the Squash Blossom Queen. The film was slated to star Bonnie Wright of the Harry Potter film franchise, and González was expected to play Brittany in the movie, but she was later dropped from the project when the role was recast in 2015.

In November 2013, González was announced as a cast member for producer Robert Rodriguez's television series, From Dusk till Dawn: The Series. González played Santanico Pandemonium, a role portrayed by Salma Hayek in the original film. The role was González's first English-speaking part, and she also featured prominently in print advertisements for the series. The show was produced by Rodriguez for his El Rey network. González relocated to Austin, Texas, to film the program's first season. Following its U.S. debut, the show became available for streaming internationally on Netflix in the UK, Canada, Australia, New Zealand, Europe and Latin America. On 26 March 2014, the series was renewed for a second season on El Rey.

On 12 August 2014, she hosted the MTV Millennial Awards at the World Trade Center Mexico City in Mexico City. In March 2015, González and the cast of From Dusk till Dawn: The Series returned to Austin, Texas, to begin filming for the show's second season.

Since 2015, González has landed a string of prominent roles, appearing as Darling in Baby Driver (2017), Madame M in Hobbs & Shaw (2019), Nyssiana in the cyberpunk film Alita: Battle Angel (2019), Fran in I Care a Lot (2020), KT in Bloodshot (2020), executive Maia Simmons in Godzilla vs. Kong (2021), and paramedic Cam Thompson in Ambulance directed by Michael Bay. In 2023, González appeared as "an artist and influencer" in the Apple TV+ climate change-themed anthology series Extrapolations, written and directed by Scott Z. Burns. González was cast in the Netflix series adaptation of The Three-Body Problem from David Benioff and D.B. Weiss. In 2024, she starred in The Ministry of Ungentlemanly Warfare directed by Guy Ritchie.

== Other projects ==
González has been a spokesperson for numerous brands. In 2008, González was chosen as the new face of Color Trend for cosmetics brand Avon in Mexico. In 2009, she filmed commercials for the skincare brand Asepxia. She was announced as the newest brand ambassador for the skincare line Neutrogena in February 2015, and filmed advertisements in both Spanish and English to promote the brand.

Following the success of her debut performance in Lola, érase una vez, González signed a deal with EMI Televisa to record her own album as a solo artist in late 2008. Pre-production and recording for González's debut album, Contracorriente, called Counter-current in English, began in fall 2008; the album was recorded in Los Angeles, Texas, and Mexico City. The album was released in Mexico on 24 November 2009. It was released in the US on 26 January 2010. The album's only single, "Mi destino soy yo" was released in Mexico on 20 October 2009. To promote the single, she performed at televised music festivals and concerts across Mexico. Because of the Sueña conmigo musical tour in Argentina, González was unable to embark on a longer tour for the album or release a second single.

In June 2011, González announced that she wished to focus on the production and recording of her second solo album. She also revealed that she planned to spend the remainder of the year working on new music and would not return to film or television projects until the album was completed. She completed production on her second album during the first months of 2012. The album was recorded in Mexico City, Texas and the Dominican Republic.

The first single off her second album, "Te Acordarás de Mí", was released for digital download on iTunes for Mexico on 16 April 2012, and 22 May 2012 for the U.S. The song was co-written by González, singer-songwriter Alejandra Alberti, and Carlos Lara in Mexico City. The album, also titled Te Acordarás de Mí, was released on 12 June 2012 in Mexico in physical and digital format, and digitally on iTunes the U.S. on the same day. The album contains 12 songs, of which González co-wrote three. Te Acordarás de Mí debuted at number 66 on the Mexican Charts. "Invisible" was announced as the second single, and was released on the radio in Mexico on 1 August 2012.

== Personal life ==
Besides her native Spanish, Gonzalez speaks English and Italian fluently and some French. In September 2015, she revealed that she struggled with depression and compulsive overeating from age 15 to age 20 as a result of her father's death. Since April 2025, González has been in a relationship with Bulgarian tennis player Grigor Dimitrov.

== Filmography ==
Key
†	Denotes films that have not yet been released

=== Film ===
Year	Title	Role	Notes
2013	The Croods	Eep (voice)	Latin Spanish dub
2014	Casi treinta	Cristina	
2015	Jem and the Holograms	Sheila "Jetta" Burns	
2017	Baby Driver	Monica "Darling" Costello	
2018	Welcome to Marwen	Caralala	
2019	Paradise Hills	Amarna	
2019	Alita: Battle Angel	Nyssiana	
2019	She's Missing	Jane	
2019	Hobbs & Shaw	Margarita / Madame M	
2020	Bloodshot	Katie / KT	
2020	Cut Throat City	Lucinda Valencia	
2020	I Care a Lot	Fran	
2021	Godzilla vs. Kong	Maia Simmons	
2021	Spirit Untamed	Milagro Navarro-Prescott (voice)	
2021	Love Spreads	Patricia	
2022	Ambulance	Camille "Cam" Thompson	
2024	The Ministry of Ungentlemanly Warfare	Marjorie Stewart / Lady Marling	
2025	Ash	Riya Ortiz	
2025	Fountain of Youth	Esme	
2026	I Love Boosters	Violeta	
2026	Mike & Nick & Nick & Alice	Alice	
2026	In the Grey	Rachel Wild	
TBA	Iron Jane †	Janie John	Post-production; also producer

=== Television ===
Year	Title	Role	Notes
2007–2008	Lola, érase una vez	Dolores "Lola" Valente	224 episodes
2009	Mujeres asesinas	Gabriela Ortega	Episode: "Tere, Desconfiada"
2010–2011	Sueña conmigo	Clara Molina / Roxy Pop	150 episodes
2012–2013	Amores verdaderos	Nikki Brizz Balvanera	181 episodes
2014–2016	From Dusk till Dawn: The Series	Santanico Pandemonium	30 episodes
2023	Extrapolations	Elodie	Episode: "2068: The Going Away Party"
2024	Mr. & Mrs. Smith	Other Jane	Episode: "First Date"
2024	3 Body Problem	Dr. Augustina "Auggie" Salazar	8 episodes
2024	La Máquina	Irasema	6 episodes

=== Theatre ===
Year	Play	Role	Notes
2008	Hoy no me puedo levantar		Cameo
2012	I Love Romeo y Julieta	Julieta	

=== Music videos ===
Year	Title	Role	Artist
2013	"Propuesta Indecente"	Rich girl	Romeo Santos
2018	"Supplies"	Girl at cult	Justin Timberlake

== Discography ==
=== Studio albums ===
Year	Album details	Peak chart positions	
Year	Album details	MEX	US
Contracorriente	Released: 24 November 2009 (Mexico); Released: 26 January 2010 (USA); Label: EMI Televisa Music	13	25
Te Acordarás de Mí	Released: 5 June 2012 (USA); Released: 12 June 2012 (Mexico and Latin America); Labels: Capitol Latin and EMI Televisa Music	66	—
"—" denotes releases that did not chart or not released to that country

=== EPs ===
Year	Album details
2009	Mi Destino Soy Yo: Released: 2009; Label: Emi Televisa Music

=== Singles ===
Year	Single	Peak chart positions	Album
Year	Single	MEX	Album
2009	"Mi Destino Soy Yo"	—	Contracorriente
2012	"Te Acordarás de Mí"	24	Te Acordarás de Mí
2012	"Invisible"	—	Te Acordarás de Mí
"—" denotes releases that did not chart

== Awards and nominations ==
Universal Awards

Year	Category	Title of work	Result
2014	Hottest Mexican Teen	Herself	Nominated

Latin Music Italian Awards

Year	Category	Title of work	Result
2014	Best Look	Herself	Nominated
2013	Best Latin Female Artist of The Year	Herself	Nominated
2013	Favorite Latin Artist	Herself	Nominated
2013	Best Look	Herself	Nominated
2013	Artist Saga	Herself	Nominated
2012
2012	Artist Saga	Herself	Nominated
2012	Best Latin Female Video of The Year	Herself	Nominated
2012	Best Latin Female Album of The Year	Te Acordarás de Mí	Nominated

TVyNovelas Award

Year	Category	Title of work	Result
2008	Best Female Revelation	Lola, érase una vez	Won

Kids' Choice Awards Mexico

Year	Category	Title of work	Result
2011	Favorite Actress	Sueña conmigo	Nominated
2013	Favorite Artist	Eiza González	Won
2013	Favorite Voice from an Animated Movie	The Croods	Won
2014	Favorite Selfie	Eiza González	Nominated
2014	Favorite Fashionista	Eiza González	Nominated

Kids' Choice Awards Argentina

Year	Category	Title of work	Result
2011	Favorite Actress	Sueña conmigo	Nominated
2011	Newcomer on TV	Sueña conmigo	Won

Meus Prêmios Nick

Year	Category	Title of work	Result
2011	Favorite Actress	Sueña conmigo	Nominated
2011	Hair Crazy	Eiza González	Nominated

Fashion Police Awards

Year	Category	Title of work	Result
2014	Best Dressed of the Year	Eiza González	Nominated

Premios Juventud

Year	Category	Title of work	Result
2013	The Girl of My Dreams	Amores verdaderos	Nominated
2013	Best Theme Novelero	"Me Puedes Pedir Lo Que Sea" (feat Marconi)	Won

Lo Nuestro Awards

Year	Category	Title of work	Result
2009	Breakout Artist or Group of the Year	Eiza González	Won

People en Español Award

Year	Category	Title of work	Result
2013	Best Actress	Amores verdaderos	Nominated
2013	Best Couple (with Sebastián Rulli)	Amores verdaderos	Nominated

Premios Oye!

Year	Category	Title of work	Result
2007	Best New Artist	Eiza González	Nominated

MTV Millennial Awards

Year	Category	Title of work	Result
2013	Cake of the Year	Eiza González	Nominated

Premios Celebrity E!

Year	Category	Title of work	Result
2012	Celebrity of the Year	Eiza González	Nominated
