= Empire (magazine) =

British monthly film magazine

- Cover of the December 2024 issue, featuring Robert Pattinson in Mickey 17
- Editor: Nick de Semlyen
- Categories: Film
- Frequency: Monthly
- Circulation: 73,291 per issue (Jan – Dec 2023); Print and digital editions.
- First issue: May 1989; 37 years ago
- Company: Bauer Media Group
- Country: United Kingdom
- Based in: London
- Language: English
- Website: empireonline.com
- ISSN: 0957-4948
- OCLC: 40516612

Empire is a British film magazine published monthly by Bauer Media Group. The first issue was published in May 1989.

== History ==
David Hepworth of Emap, the publisher of British music magazines Q and Smash Hits, proposed the idea of launching a film magazine similar to Q. They recruited Smash Hits editor Barry McIlheney to edit the new magazine, with Hepworth as Editorial Director. Hepworth drafted a one-page proposal outlining the magazine's objectives, including a commitment to reviewing and rating every film released in UK cinema. The proposal also stated, "Empire believes that movies can sometimes be art, but they should always be fun." The first edition (June/July 1989) was published in May 1989, featuring Dennis Quaid and Winona Ryder on the cover for the film Great Balls of Fire!. The magazine achieved its initial sales target of 50,000 copies.

Film reviews were given a star rating between 1 and 5, with no half-stars.

McIlheney was editor for the first 44 issues, after which assistant editor Phil Thomas, who had been with the magazine since its inception, took over from the March 1993 issue. In 1995, Thomas became managing editor and Q Features Editor Andrew Collins was appointed Empire's editor from issue 73 (July 1995). However, after 3 issues, Collins transitioned to Q following the departure of Danny Kelly, and Empire's Features Editor Mark Salisbury was promoted to Editor.

In 2006, a compilation of the magazine's film reviews was published as the Empire Film Guide.

In early 2008, Bauer acquired Emap Consumer Media.

=== Editors ===
Empire has had eleven editors:

- Barry McIlheney (issues 1–44)
- Phil Thomas (issues 45–72)
- Andrew Collins (issues 73–75)
- Mark Salisbury (issues 76–88)
- Ian Nathan (issues 89–126)
- Emma Cochrane (issues 127–161)
- Colin Kennedy (162–209) (Will Lawrence acted as editor for 12 issues while Colin Kennedy was absent)
- Mark Dinning (210–304). Dinning was formerly Associate Editor of the magazine leaving to take up the position of Editor of Total Film for a period, he then returned to take up the same role for Empire. He left the magazine in July 2014.
- Morgan Rees (issues 306–315)
- Terri White (issues 318—393)
- Nick De Semlyen (since issue 394)
- Steven Spielberg guest-edited the magazine's 20th Anniversary Issue in June 2009.
- Sam Mendes guest-edited the magazine's Spectre special in September 2015.

== Regular features ==
Empire reviews both mainstream films and art films, but feature articles concentrate on the former. Ian Freer is a regular reviewer for the magazine.

As well as film news, previews, and reviews, Empire has some other regular features. Each issue (with the exception of issues 108–113) features a Classic Scene, a transcript from a notable film scene. The first such classic scene to be featured was the "I coulda been a contender" scene from On the Waterfront.

The Re.View section covers Blu-ray and DVD news and releases. Kim Newman's Movie Dungeon is a regular feature in the Re.View section, in which critic Kim Newman reviews the most obscure releases, mostly low-budget horror movies. Newman has written for Empire since the first issue.

How Much Is a Pint of Milk? presents celebrities' answers to silly or unusual questions, including the question "How much is a pint of milk?" This is intended as a guide to the chosen celebrity's contact with reality, and as such can be more informative than a direct interview by reporting some surprising responses. Willem Dafoe was the first interviewee in issue 59 (May 1994).

Each magazine includes a "Spine Quote", in which a relatively challenging quote is printed on the spine of the magazine. There are usually some obvious and obscure links from the quote to the main features of that month's edition. Readers are invited to identify the film source and the links to win a prize.

=== The Empire Masterpiece ===
A regular feature since Raging Bull featured in issue 167 (May 2003), the Empire Masterpiece is a two-page essay on a film selected by Empire in the Re.View section. Only a few issues since the first masterpiece feature have not featured one – 179, 196–198 and 246. Issue 241 (June 2009) had director Frank Darabont select 223 masterpieces. L.A. Confidential and Magnolia have been featured twice.

== Podcasts ==
Empire launched their first podcast, The Empire Podcast, in March 2012. In July 2022, the podcast won in the "Best Live Podcast" category at the British Podcast Awards.

== Awards ==
From 1996 until 2018, Empire organised the annual Empire Awards, voted for by readers of the magazine, which were originally sponsored by Sony Ericsson, and from 2009 sponsored by Jameson. The last awards were held in 2018 and after that the awards were discontinued for undisclosed reasons.

== See also ==
- The Film Daily annual critics' poll
- List of film periodicals

Similar periodicals

- Cahiers du Cinéma
- Sight & Sound
