= Tempo map =

Representation of varying tempo

A tempo map is a part of a MIDI file. Musical events occur as a succession of events in time, whose speed is tempo. Music also organizes these according to a framework called meter, by partitioning time into patterns of "strong" and "weak" beats. MIDI's tempo map specifies the speed at which a file's events are transmitted within this framework: their tempo. If a file plays at a fixed tempo, its map is a horizontal line (e.g., measures 38 and 39 in this part of a MIDI sequencer’s display of the end of J.S. Bach's prelude #8 from Book I of the Well-tempered Clavier):

But, if the tempo fluctuates as a function of time, such as in accelerando, allargando, or rubato, the line is respectively an upward- or downward-climbing one, or in the latter case, a complex curve, as seen here in measures 35 and 36 at left, or the ending in measures 40 and 41.

In most music, aesthetics demand that this flow of events not be linear, but fluctuate according to the expression the music intends to convey. Hence, a very emotional piece such as the preceding is excerpted from, although playing at a base tempo of MM=50 — which means 50 quarter notes per minute, holding back or lunging forward according to expressive impulse can result in a tempo map similar to that seen above: It flexes tempo down for the intermediate cadence at left, and again for the final allargando at the right.

After recording a sequence in real time at a fixed tempo, or composing it using step-record mode, MIDI sequencer software may have functionality to edit the MIDI tempo map, so as to result in a natural, expressive result, not a machine-like one, when playing the file.
