= EMI Televisa Music =

EMI Televisa Music or Televisa EMI Music was a record label established in 2005 as a partnership between EMI Latin and Televisa. It focused on Latin American music. The joint venture between the two ended in 2009.

== Artists signed to this label ==
- A.B. Quintanilla III presents Kumbia All Starz
- Alejandra Guzmán
- Aleks Syntek
- Alexandre Pires
- Amaral
- Ana Gabriel
- Anahí
- Andy Andy
- Arthur Hanlon
- Bebe
- Belinda
- Bunbury
- Cabas
- Carlos Vives
- Chetes
- Chicos de Barrio
- DJ Kane
- Diego González
- Eiza González
- Flex
- Fonseca
- Héroes del Silencio
- Intocable
- JD Natasha
- Jerry Rivera
- Juan Luis Guerra
- La Nueva Banda Timbiriche
- Lucero
- Myriam Montemayor Cruz
- Miranda!
- Moenia
- Noelia
- Obie Bermúdez
- Plastilina Mosh
- Pepe Aguilar
- Pee Wee
- Raphael
- RBD
- Ricardo Montaner
- Ruth Vazquez
- Selena
- Shaila Dúrcal
- Thalía (1994-2008)
- Timbiriche
- Tiziano Ferro
- Tito El Bambino
- Tony Touch
- Vicente Garcia
- Vico C
