= Stolen Picture =

Stolen Picture Ltd.
- Type: Private
- Industry: Motion pictures; Television
- Founded: 2016; 10 years ago
- Founder: Simon Pegg; Nick Frost
- Defunct: March 2025
- Fate: Closed
- Headquarters: London, England
- Key people: Miles Ketley (CEO, 2017–2020); Wayne Garvie (CCO)
- Owner: Sony Pictures Television International Production (minority stake, 2017–2022; 100%, 2022–2025)
- Website: stolenpicture.com

Stolen Picture Ltd. was a British film production company founded by Simon Pegg and Nick Frost in 2016, with Miles Ketley joining in July 2017.

== Overview ==
On 16 May 2017, it was announced that Simon Pegg and Nick Frost had launched a film and television production banner called Stolen Picture. The first production by the company was Slaughterhouse Rulez, a horror-comedy film. Crispian Mills directed the project, based on a script he co-wrote with Henry Fitzherbert. Sony Pictures backed the film, which Pegg and Frost executive-produced.

On 20 September 2017, it was announced that Sony Pictures Television had taken a minority stake in the production company. In addition, Stolen Picture entered into an exclusive television distribution deal with Sony. Concurrently with the Sony Pictures Television announcement, it was announced that Miles Ketley has been appointed CEO of Stolen Picture, joining from Bad Wolf. Wayne Garvie, president of international production for Sony Pictures Television, was subsequently hired as the company's chief creative officer.

On 19 January 2018, it was announced that Stolen Picture was developing their first television project Truth Seekers, a half-hour comedy-horror series about a three-person paranormal investigation team. On 19 October 2020, it was announced that Miles Ketley died unexpectedly, only days before the premiere of the TV comedy Truth Seekers, debuting 30 October.

On 1 May 2019, it was announced that Stolen Picture would develop a television adaptation of Ben Aaronovitch's Rivers of London novel series. However, by July 2022, development on the series moved to Pure Fiction Television and Unnecessary Logo—a production company Aaronovitch himself has created.

In October 2020, Stolen Picture produced the comedy series Out of Her Mind, which was commissioned following a 2018 pilot, Sara Pascoe Vs Monogamy.

In March 2025, Sony Pictures Television closed Stolen Picture after acquiring the entire company in 2022 resulting in the departures of founders Simon Pegg and Nick Frost from day-to-day operations, with the legal entity liquidated while the IP and branding were retained. No employees were impacted.

== Feature films ==
Release date	Film	Directed by	Budget	Gross	Co-producers	Distributor
31 October 2018	Slaughterhouse Rulez	Crispian Mills	£5.2 million	£738,000	Catalyst Global Media; Sony Pictures International Productions	Sony Pictures Releasing

== Television series ==
Release date	Series	Creators	Directed by	Co-producers	Network
20 October 2020 – 24 November 2020	Out of Her Mind	Sara Pascoe	Ben Blaine; Chris Blaine	—N/a	BBC Two
30 October 2020	Truth Seekers	Simon Pegg; Nick Frost; James Serafinowicz; Nat Saunders	Jim Field Smith	Sony Pictures Television; Amazon Studios	Amazon Prime Video
