= Out of Her Mind =

- Genre: Sitcom
- Directed by: Ben Blaine; Chris Blaine
- Starring: Sara Pascoe; Fiona Button; Juliet Stevenson; Cariad Lloyd; Tom Stuart
- Country of origin: United Kingdom
- Original language: English
- No. of series: 1
- No. of episodes: 6

Production
- Executive producers: Nick Frost; Miles Ketley; Sara Pascoe; Simon Pegg
- Running time: 27–28 minutes
- Production company: Stolen Picture

Original release
- Network: BBC Two
- Release: 20 October – 24 November 2020

Out of Her Mind is a British television sitcom created by, written by, and starring Sara Pascoe. It follows a fictionalised Sara Pascoe, who had an abortion when she was young and was left at the altar by a former partner, as her sister becomes engaged. The programme features heavy usage of the protagonist talking to the camera and breaking the fourth wall, and its subject matter relates to Pascoe's books Animal and Sex Power Money, which are about sexuality and biology. The show received mostly positive reception.

== Production ==
The series was produced by Stolen Picture. It was commissioned following a 2018 pilot, Sara Pascoe Vs Monogamy. The executive producers were Pascoe, Nick Frost, Miles Ketley and Simon Pegg. Ben and Chris Blaine directed the series. The series was announced in August 2019. It was written and filmed at Ealing Studios before the COVID-19 pandemic caused a lockdown in Britain, but released during the pandemic. The cast were announced in March 2020. The series aired on BBC Two, premiering on 20 October 2020.

The choice to cast Jack Gleeson as the ghost of Pascoe's abortion was based on advice Pascoe was given to "choose an actor that everyone wishes was dead", following his role as the sadistic Joffrey Baratheon in Game of Thrones.

== Cast and characters ==
- Sara Pascoe as Sara Pascoe
- Fiona Button as Lucy, Sara's sister
- Juliet Stevenson as Carol, Sara's mother
- Cariad Lloyd as Scoopy, Sara's friend
- Tom Stuart as Stefan

== Episodes ==
No.	Title	Original release date
1	"I Don't"	20 October 2020
Sara Pascoe's sister Lucy becomes engaged, to Pascoe's distress. Pascoe was previously left at the altar.
2	"Eat Me"	27 October 2020
3	"My Life is Ova"	3 November 2020
4	"Pop!"	10 November 2020
5	"Pants on Fire"	17 November 2020
6	"The Beautiful Garden"	24 November 2020

== Analysis ==
The show's subject matter—that of sexual relationships and biology—overlaps with Pascoe's two books, Animal: The Autobiography of a Female Body and Sex Power Money. It also relates to her BBC Radio 4 series The Modern Monkey.

The style in which the woman protagonist talks to the camera is similar to that of British comedies including Chewing Gum, Fleabag, I Hate Suzie, Miranda and This Way Up. Hugo Rifkind of The Times believed that Out of Her Mind went further than these shows in its breaking of the fourth wall, calling it "a commentary on sitcoms". The programme employs tropes before deconstructing them and challenging the audience about their usage. The protagonist shares her name with the actor who plays her. Another case of a sitcom in which a comedian plays a character named after herself is The Duchess, a 2020 Netflix series starring Katherine Ryan.

== Reception ==
Ben Dowell of The Times gave the show a rating of four stars out of five, praising it as a "rollerblading ringmaster of confessional comedy". In a four star review for The Telegraph, Helen Brown found it "punchy and clever". Lucy Mangan of The Guardian also rated it four out of five stars, reviewing that the show improved after a "slightly shaky start". Mangan wrote that it "evolves into something delicately intricate, clever and – by the end – moving". Iain Leggat of The Scotsman similar found that the show improved after a "sluggish" pilot, praising the cast and Pascoe as "most at ease" when "dissecting the dynamics of sexual politics directly to camera".

Rifkind praised the programme as "self-knowing, self-mocking and very clever", summarising that it is "deceptively intricate and sometimes quite brilliant too". In contrast, Euan Ferguson of The Observer criticised the show as "relentlessly, scattily modernist" and "very dated", being "mystified" by it. However, Ferguson praised the supporting cast. Charlotte Cripps of The Independent reviewed the show negatively, finding that it differs from shows with similar premises "because you don't see yourself in" the protagonist and that its cynical message "wears thin".
