= Jason Domino =

British advocate

Jason Domino is a British sexual health and wellbeing advocate, sex work activist and porn star. He has demonstrate the efficacy of PrEP on film: by not acquiring HIV during condom-less sex with a person living with HIV with a high viral load.

== Activism ==
Domino was a speaker at the United Nations social forum of the human rights council 2017 in Palais des Nations, Geneva and at the 19th annual conference of NHIVNA

In 2018 he was the subject of a BBC Three documentary about his career, activism and growing up in the church.

He has spoken about his experience as a HIV negative performer in the adult industry who performs with HIV positive performers. He is a member of the Sex Workers Union.

He has appeared on Sara Pascoe’ Sex Power Money podcast.
