= Little Monster =

Little Monster may refer to:

- Little Monster (song) by Royal Blood
- The Monster Kid (Japanese: 怪物くん, Hepburn: Kaibutsu-kun; Little Monster), shōnen manga and anime series by Fujiko Fujio
- Little Monster LP by Canadian rapper Madchild
- Little Monster (children's book series), children's book series by Mercer Mayer
- "The Little Monster", nickname of Kuo Po-cheng, Taiwanese professional pool player
- "The Little Monster", a Private Secretary episode
- "The Little Monster", a The Beverly Hillbillies episode
- Daddy's Little Monster
- Mommy's Little Monster (disambiguation)
- My Little Monster

== See also ==
- Little Monsters (disambiguation)
