= Wayne Garvie =

British television executive

- Born: 9 September 1963 (age 63); Plymouth
- Occupation: Television executive
- Years active: 1988–present

Wayne Garvie (born 9 September 1963) is an English television industry executive, working as President, International Production at Sony Pictures Television since 2017.

== Early life ==
Garvie was born in Plymouth, Devon, where his father was a Royal Marine and his mother a shopworker. The family moved to Suffolk and he attended a private school Woodbridge School, Suffolk, England (then a grammar school). He holds a first class honours degree and Honorary DLitt from the University of Kent and is both a Ph.D. in Economic History and Honorary Doctor of Letters from the University of Sheffield.

== Career ==
Garvie joined Granada Television in Manchester in 1988 as a sports researcher. He spent ten years at Granada as a producer on various entertainment shows such as This Morning, The Krypton Factor and Live from the Lilydrome, before becoming Director of Broadcasting in 1996, with responsibility for what was then the ITV broadcaster for the North West of England.

In 1998 he moved to the BBC, first as Head of Entertainment & Features Manchester, before taking overall responsibility for all the television and radio output from Manchester and well as the BBC’s television music shows. This period saw the launch of archive based pop culture strands such as I Love the ‘70s, When…Ruled the World, as well as the revamp of traditional favourites such as A Question of Sport and Top of the Pops. He became an advocate for greater BBC representation in the North West which eventually led to the creation of MediaCityUK in Salford. He also oversaw the Music production arm of Entertainment for the BBC. In 2002, he was promoted to Head of Entertainment Group for the BBC, overseeing the Corporation’s inhouse production teams.

Garvie is credited with changing the culture of the department and the birth of a new era of programmes at the BBC. Among the shows his team brought to the screen were Strictly Come Dancing, Honey, We’re Killing the Kids, Hard Spell and Dragons' Den, which he predicted would become a major hit: “It is symbolic of everything we are trying to do”.

The announcement of Strictly Come Dancing was not met with great enthusiasm, with commentators mocking its launch and claiming it would only irritate broadcasting watchdogs who had criticised the BBC for derivative entertainment. Garvie’s comment at the launch: “What could be more public service than inviting the nation to enjoy the thrills and spills of ballroom dancing?” was mocked in the press. The show went on to become not only a hit in the UK, but around the world, licensed to 60 countries, with The Guinness Book of Records declaring it the world’s most successful reality format.

At first, BBC Worldwide failed to sell the format in the US, but Garvie took his team to sell directly which led to ABC commissioning Dancing with the Stars. This was the first time the BBC had produced a show in the US for American network television and led to the creation of the first BBC production unit outside of the UK. From there Garvie left the BBC’s public service arm to join BBC Worldwide in a newly created role of Managing Director Content and Production.

At BBC Worldwide, Garvie took responsibility for growing brands such as Dancing with the Stars, Top Gear and Doctor Who internationally. He also initiated new strategies of starting BBC production companies around the world and investing in new start up British independents. The first of these was Left Bank Pictures led by former Granada executive Andy Harries, followed by Big Talk, Clerkenwell and Baby Cow.

In 2010 Garvie left BBC Worldwide to join All3Media as Managing Director International Production. He left within two years to join Sony Pictures Television as Chief Creative Officer for International Production, working to Andrea Wong who had commissioned Dancing with the Stars for ABC. In 2017, following Wong’s departure, he was promoted to President, International Production.

As President he now oversees SPT’s global network of production companies outside the US, covering Europe, Asia, Latin America and Australia.

In the UK, Sony is the majority owner of Left Bank Pictures – producers of The Crown, Quiz and Strike Back. In 2020, Garvie led the acquisition of Eleven, producers of Sex Education, and led an investment in Whisper Group. Sony also has a number of minority investments in drama companies such as Fable Pictures – Anne Boleyn – Blueprint Pictures – A Very English Scandal, and Stolen Picture – Truth Seekers. Garvie also greenlit a television series based around Anthony Horowitz’s Alex Rider books, the first time the studio had produced a series in the UK without a commission from producers Eleventh Hour Films.

In 2018 Garvie approached Jeremy Clarkson to present a return of Who Wants to be a Millionaire, although the host later said “I wasn’t really listening, I never thought it would actually happen”. The show has since become a staple of the ITV schedule and led to a round of further reboots of the format around the world.

== Personal life ==
Garvie is married to Tess Willmott, MD of lifestyle communications agency Sauce, and has two daughters from a previous marriage. He also two step-children, one son and one daughter.

== Television programmes ==
- Strictly Come Dancing
- Dragons' Den
- Honey, We're Killing the Kids
- Hardspell and The House of Tiny Tearaways
- The Weakest Link
- A Question of Sport
- Mastermind
- Eurovision
- Later with Jools Holland
