= Princess Productions =

Defunct mass media television production company

- Final logo, used from 2006 to 2017.

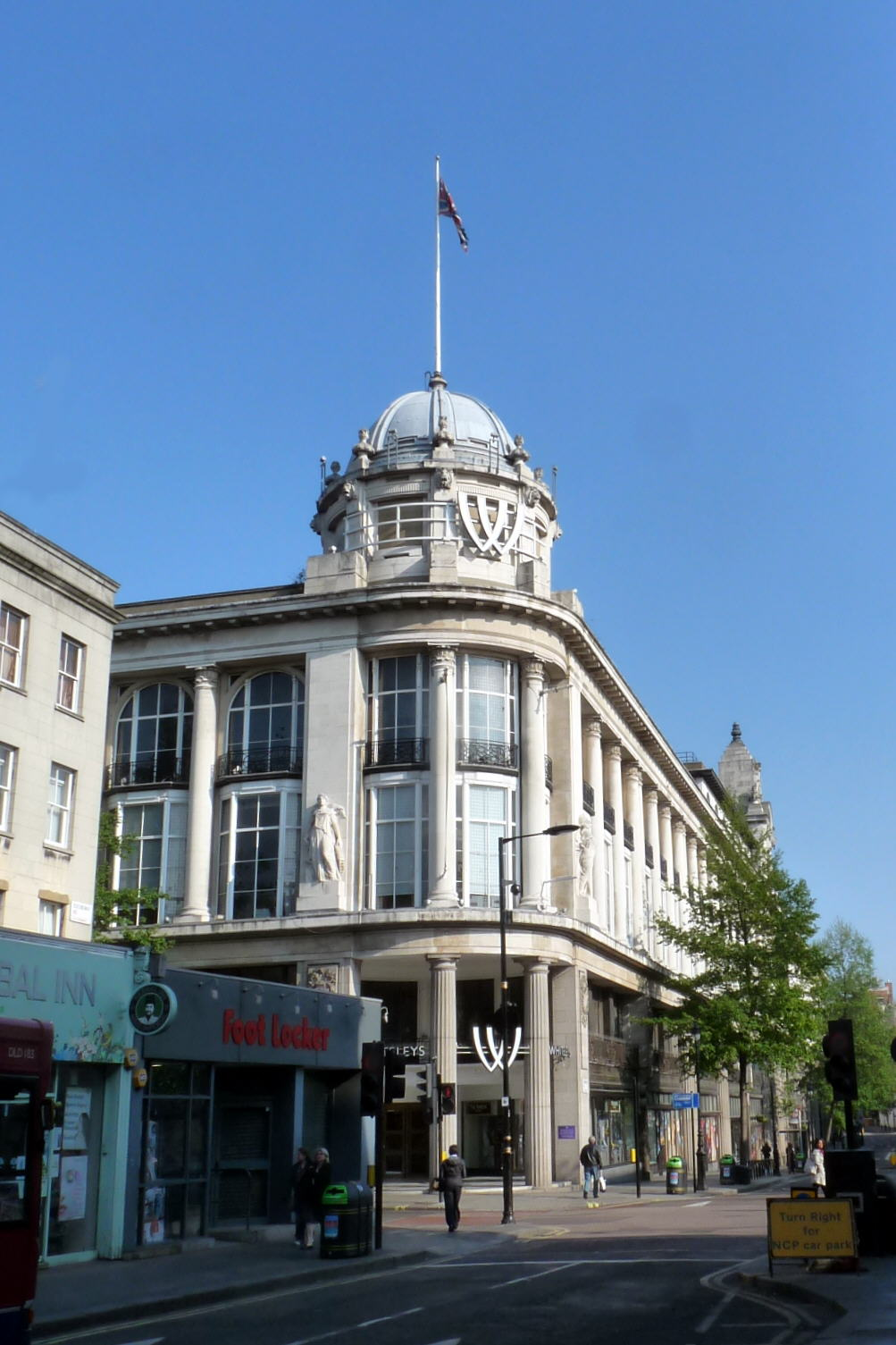
- Headquarters at Whiteleys
- Type: Subsidiary
- Industry: Television
- Founded: 15 September 1996; 29 years ago
- Founders: Henrietta Conrad; Sebastian Scott
- Defunct: 31 December 2017; 8 years ago
- Fate: Closed due to business failure and financial instability
- Headquarters: Whiteleys, London, United Kingdom
- Key people: Jon Kingston (CFO); Henrietta Conrad (Managing Director)
- Owner: Endemol Shine Group
- Number of employees: 150
- Parent: Endemol Shine UK

Princess Productions was a London‑based television production company, formed by Henrietta Conrad and Sebastian Scott. It produced broadcast shows and pilots across a variety of genres for numerous major British broadcasters, mainly specialising in entertainment and factual entertainment programmes. Highlights included Got to Dance, Must Be the Music, T4 and The Sunday Night Project.

Princess was based in Whiteleys in West London, where it had its own television studio and in-house post-production facility.

== History ==
Princess Productions was founded in 1996. In 2006, the company became part of the Shine Group, one of the UK's largest television production company groups.

In 2017, Shine announced that Princess Productions would be closed down by the end of the year, as it was "financially fragile" and losing its space in Whiteleys, which was to be redeveloped. The company went on for another year as Princess Studios before its website was taken down.

=== Controversies ===
In October 2011, an employee of Princess Productions left a message on the unofficial Army Rumour Service message boards pitching the idea of flying British soldiers' wives and newborn babies into warzones as a surprise. The response was overwhelmingly negative. Soon afterwards, the Princess Productions website went offline. The company also posted an apology on the forum.

== Programming ==
Princess-made shows included:

- Famous and Fearless – eight celebrities compete against each other in dangerous extreme sports to win money for charity and prove that they are the most fearless. (Channel 4, 2011)
- Got to Dance – search for the UK and Ireland's best dance act, hosted by Davina McCall and judged by Ashley Banjo, Pussycat Doll Kimberly Wyatt and tap dancer Adam Garcia. (Sky 1, 2010–2014)
- Must Be the Music – Sky1 talent competition for music acts who write and perform their own songs. All proceeds from record sales went direct to the artists. Hosted by Fearne Cotton and judged by Dizzee Rascal, Sharleen Spiteri and Jamie Cullum. (Sky 1, 2010)
- T4 – long-running weekend magazine show aimed at viewers aged 16 to 24 years old. Regular hosts included Will Best, Matt Edmondson, Nick Grimshaw, Jameela Jamil and Georgie Okell. (Channel 4, 1998–2012; E4, 2012)
- iTunes Festival – coverage of the UK's biggest indoor music festival, including gigs from London's Roundhouse in Camden throughout every night of July. Presented by Fearne Cotton, Dave Berry and Matt Edmondson. (ITV2)
- The Wright Stuff – British television chat show, hosted by Matthew Wright. The format is based upon the more traditional radio phone in, featuring well-known guests discussing topical issues, and encouraging contributions from the studio and television audiences, text messages, emails and a phone vote, originally produced by Anglia TV from 2000 to 2001. (Channel 5, 2000–2018)
- Something for the Weekend – weekly magazine style entertainment show, including cookery, celebrity guests and television clips. (BBC Two, 2006–2012)
- Sunday Brunch – weekly magazine style entertainment show, including cookery, celebrity guests and television clips. (Channel 4, 25 March 2012–present)
- The Friday Night Project/The Sunday Night Project – weekly comedy variety show in which regular hosts Justin Lee Collins and Alan Carr are joined by a celebrity guest host. These guests provide an opening monologue, are interviewed by Alan and Justin and take questions from the studio audience. They also take part in comedy sketches, hidden camera stunts and a game show where someone from the audience is selected to win prizes. (Channel 4, 2005–2009)
- Eddie Stobart: Trucks & Trailers – documentary soap series following the stories behind Britain's biggest haulage company and its drivers battles with the roads to get deliveries completed on time.
- The Search – ten contestants with unique skills must solve a variety of ancient clues and puzzles from throughout history, with the aim in each episode of finding "The Symbol". The team that fulfils this directive wins the game and the losing team must sacrifice a team member. The final episode saw the remaining (three) contestants compete to uncover a £50,000 hidden treasure. (Channel 4, 2007)
- Doctor, Doctor – live daily show tackling a series of topical medical issues in front of a studio audience. Medical experts in different fields answer viewers' questions about their physical and mental wellbeing (Channel 5, 2006).
- Date My Mum (UK) – similar to the US show (Date My Mom); each episode features a different guy looking for love in the weirdest place – on dates with three different mums. (MTV, 2006–2007).
- Danger! 50,000 Volts! – Comedy survival series in which Nick Frost meets up with experts in different fields of survival and asks questions on what to do in highly unlikely but dangerous situations.
- Show Me the Money – live daily game show pitting teams against the Stock Exchange. Winner of the Royal Television Society "Daytime Show of the Year".. (Channel 4)
- Light Lunch – comedy daytime chat show with Sue Perkins and Mel Giedroyc.
- Lily Allen and Friends – chat show with singer Lily Allen, with an audience of her friends on Myspace. (BBC Three, 2008).
- Little Monsters – game show (Sky One, 4 September – 6 November 2003).
