= The Sofa of Time =

- Genre: Comedy drama
- Running time: 30 minutes
- Country of origin: United Kingdom
- Language: English
- Home station: BBC Radio 4
- Starring: Nick Frost; Matt King; Mark Heap; Julia Deakin; Simon Pegg; Peter Serafinowicz; Joseph Marcell
- Created by: Nick Frost; Matt King
- Written by: Nick Frost; Matt King
- Original release: 24 October – 28 November 2002
- No. of series: 1
- No. of episodes: 6
- Audio format: Stereophonic sound
- Website: BBC website

The Sofa of Time is a BBC Radio 4 fantasy comedy drama written by and starring Nick Frost and Matt King. It was first broadcast in 2002.

== Concept ==
Milford (King) and Parker (Frost) get sacked from their jobs in a soft furnishings factory in Crouch End. As they are clearing out their lockers, they fall into the magical world of Gravy. Frost described Gravy as a "Tolkien-esque world with supermarkets and banks".

There they meet Marmite the Dwarf (Mark Heap), who believes that Milford is "the chosen one" and has come at last to save the people from the evil emperor warlock Raamen Bod (Peter Serafinowicz), who plans to find the Sofa of Time, the most magical and powerful item of furniture in the entire universe, and use it for evil purposes.

== History ==
The series features Spaced regulars Mark Heap, Julia Deakin, Peter Serafinowicz, and Simon Pegg as well as Kevin Eldon, Daisy Jones and Joseph Marcell. The series was produced by Mario Stylianides, for Talkback.

The BBC offered King and Frost a second series, but they declined as King had moved back to Australia. The series has never been made commercially available, but over the years it has been repeated several times on BBC Radio 4 Extra (and that channel's earlier incarnation, BBC Radio 7).

== Episode list ==
Episode	Title	First broadcast
1	There's a World in My Locker	24 October 2002
2	Where The Brave Go Shopping	31 October 2002
3	And the Hackett March On...	7 November 2002
4	Captain Chapel and the Crabs	14 November 2002
5	Night of the Sexicle	21 November 2002
6	Here Comes Bod	28 November 2002

- Some sources (e.g. epguides.com) also list the alternative title "A Lovely Day in Tangleton" for episode two.
- The web page maintained by BBC Radio 4 Extra lists the first episode as "There's Gravy in My Locker". This was clearly an afterthought, and can be regarded as an administrative error, since the unchanged announcement within the episode still entitles it "There's a World in My Locker".

== Soundtrack ==
The soundtrack borrowed heavily from Maurice Jarre's score for Franco Zeffirelli's Jesus of Nazareth
