= Little Monsters =

Little Monsters may refer to:

== Film and television ==
- Little Monsters (1989 film), an American fantasy comedy film directed by Richard Alan Greenberg
- Little Monsters (2019 film), a zombie horror film directed by Abe Forsythe
- Little Monsters (TV series), a 1998 British animated children's show
- Little Monsters (game show), a 2003 British game show
- Little Monsters (Israeli TV series), a 2016–2019 series featuring Ori Pfeffer
- "Little Monsters" (Beverly Hills, 90210), a 1995 TV episode
- "Little Monsters" (Charmed), a 2003 TV episode

== Other uses ==
- Little Monsters, fans of the American singer Lady Gaga
- Little Monsters, a 2023 novel by Adrienne Brodeur

== See also ==
- Little Monster (disambiguation)
