= Danger! 50,000 Volts! =

- DVD cover for the series
- Genre: Comedy survival series
- Presented by: Nick Frost
- Country of origin: United Kingdom
- Original language: English
- No. of episodes: 8

Production
- Executive producers: Sebastian Scott; Henrietta Conrad; Justin Gorman
- Producer: Jon Riley
- Running time: 23 - 24 minutes per episode
- Production company: Princess Productions

Original release
- Network: Five

Danger! 50,000 Volts! was a 2002 British television programme written and presented by Nick Frost, which presented viewers with various life-threatening scenarios and suggested ways out of these situations.

The show was a spoof of the outdoors survival genre in which survival experts demonstrated how to improvise solutions to dangerous problems. A feature of the series was the clever and humorous use of danger iconography in the graphic design of segment titles, further identifying the show with the British tradition of stoic resolve in the face of (comically) overwhelming odds.

In the DVD release of the programme, a 30-minute spin-off episode called Danger! 50,000 Zombies! is included as an extra. This episode saw Frost paired up with Dr. Russell Fell (played by Simon Pegg), as they dealt with the situation of a zombie outbreak and what to do in such an event.

In 2003, a second season was made called Danger! Incoming Attack!
