= Wudja Cudja =

British television series

Wudja Cudja was a UK-based gameshow created by British TV producers Remy Blumenfeld and Gavin Hay hosted by Abbie Eastwood and Jayne Sharp, designed to see how far ordinary members of the public would be prepared to go to be on TV and win money. It debuted on ITV, and ran in reruns on ITV2 for two seasons.

The series was first broadcast on 18 July 2002 and ran for twenty one-hour editions.

== Format ==
The show would open with a monologue by the two hosts, usually loosely referencing what the contestants were to do, followed by a really quick montage of the following dares to come. Contestants were picked off the street at random, and most of the time, not even told what dare they were going to do prior, but what cash amount they were to receive.

The show also usually had a big challenge where 1,000 GBP was up for grabs. These were usually accumulative three part challenges with each one getting worse. Money wasn't received for these until the last one was completed.

The show is usually done in a leave-off format, in that the contestants tend to be already rounded up, skipping the process of finding them in the street more often than not. Transitions are coupled by quick montages.

== Recurring Dares ==
Although Wudja Cudja has its share of variations, episodes tended to contain much nudity, branding it an adult program overall. Some of the recurring games were:

- Rip and Strip

Two [not always] female contestants would compete in a contest to see who could rip their clothes off the fastest. The women weren't allowed to use any zippers, or buttons, and had to strip down to just their panties. This was a common game and the contestants were always caught off guard and picked randomly off the street.

- Bikini Tug-O-War

Another female specific game in which contestants would have each other's bikinis put together, and pull against each other to see whose ripped off.

== Varied Dares ==
Aside from the usual strip games, Wudja Cudja's other dares were similar to that of its American counterpart, I Bet You Will, with contestants either:

- Eating something disgusting.
- Getting their head shaved.
- Being covered in something messy, and or publicly humiliated.
- Something involving endurance, such as how many clothes pins can one put on their face, or how long can one hold sawdust in her bikini bottoms without scratching.
