= Jayne Sharp =

English broadcaster

Jayne Sharp in 'I hit Barry Norman in the balls with a bag of phlegm' - Jayne Sharp - #BeyondReelTalk ep. 23. Uploaded to Youtube by Beyond Reel Talk under CC-BY-3.0 Unported Licence on September 9, 2024.

Jayne Sharp (born 20 July 1977) is an English broadcaster who is a former host of Bingo Night Live on ITV.

== Early life ==
Sharp is from Durkar in Wakefield, West Yorkshire. Before presenting, Sharp went to the University of Lincolnshire and Humberside to study Media and Film, achieving a BA Hons degree. Her first job in TV was as a runner on Family Affairs, and she also worked in Durkar Fisheries, a fish and chip shop.

== Presenting career ==
Sharp has previously hosted Dial-a-Date (ITV), Live With Christian O'Connell (Five), Bad Lads Army (ITV2), 50 Years 50 Records (ITV and ITV2), Glory Ball Live (Challenge), (owned at the time by then-boyfriend Chris Evans), Wudja Cudja (ITV) and Little Monsters on Sky One.

On a number of occasions throughout 2010, Sharp guest presented Live From Studio Five, taking the place of Melinda Messenger, Kate Walsh and Emma Willis whilst they were indisposed. She presented an episode of The Hot Desk for ITV2.

== Writing ==
Sharp writes a column for What Woman Want, a monthly supplement for the Wakefield Express.

== Personal life ==
Sharp has a daughter, Nicole Catherine Vitty (born 2 August 2007) by David Vitty. The couple married 23 August 2008. In April 2011, it was announced they were getting divorced.

On 23 March 2016, Sharp gave birth to a daughter, Piper, by fiancé Ross Neil.

Sharp had also previously dated and lived with DJ Chris Evans.
