= Truth Seekers =

2020 comedy-horror series by Nick Frost

- Official poster
- Genre: Comedy horror
- Created by: Nick Frost; Simon Pegg; James Serafinowicz; Nat Saunders
- Directed by: Jim Field Smith
- Starring: Nick Frost; Simon Pegg
- Music by: Robin Foster
- Country of origin: United Kingdom
- Original language: English
- No. of series: 1
- No. of episodes: 8

Production
- Executive producers: Nick Frost; Simon Pegg; Nat Saunders; Peter Serafinowicz; Miles Ketley; Jim Field Smith
- Cinematography: Arthur Mulhern
- Editors: Steve Ackroyd; David Webb
- Running time: 24–32 minutes
- Production companies: Stolen Picture; Sony Pictures Television; Amazon Studios

Original release
- Network: Amazon Prime Video
- Release: 30 October 2020

Truth Seekers is a 2020 British supernatural comedy horror television series created by Nick Frost, Simon Pegg, James Serafinowicz, and Nat Saunders. The series was directed by Jim Field Smith and stars Nick Frost and Simon Pegg, with Emma D'Arcy, Samson Kayo, Julian Barratt, Susan Wokoma, and Malcolm McDowell in supporting roles.

The first two episodes premiered at the Canneseries Festival, on 10 October 2020, followed by an Amazon Prime Video release on 30 October 2020.

On 11 February 2021, Frost announced via his Instagram page that the show had been cancelled.

== Cast ==
- Nick Frost as Gus Roberts: A broadband installer for Smyle internet. He has an interest in paranormal investigations, and Frost described his character as someone "lost and looking for some truth in many aspects of his life."
- Emma D'Arcy as Astrid: A young woman haunted by several ghosts.
- Samson Kayo as Elton John: Gus' new partner at Smyle and in paranormal investigations. Running themes are nobody reacting to his name, his previous experiences at a variety of random jobs, and his ability to unwittingly discover secret passages.
- Malcolm McDowell as Richard: Gus' aging father-in-law.
- Simon Pegg as David: Gus' boss and the head of the broadband company Smyle.
- Susie Wokoma as Helen: Elton's sister, an agoraphobic and anxious cosplayer.
- Julian Barratt as Dr. Peter Toynbee
- Rosalie Craig as Emily Roberts: Gus' wife who died ten years prior to the start of the series.
- Kelly Macdonald as Jojo74
- Taj Atwal as Elara: Toynbee's devoted assistant, so much so that she sacrifices her life to further his plans.
- Mike Beckingham as Bjorn
- Jon Rumney as Doctor Connelly
- Ranjit Krishnamma as Terry

== Premise ==
Gus Roberts is the number one engineer at Smyle, Britain's biggest mobile network operator and Internet service provider. In his spare time he's also a keen investigator of the paranormal. Gus is initially disappointed when his boss David partners him up with new recruit Elton John, but the two rapidly form a friendship, working together both professionally and in the paranormal; however, Elton is less enthusiastic than Gus in this area. They are joined by Astrid, a young woman who is chased through a house and later a hospital by several ghosts. She escapes the hospital and runs through the countryside before meeting Gus and Elton. Also introduced are Elton's agoraphobic sister Helen, a nervous cosplayer, and Gus' grumpy father-in-law Richard.

=== Episodes ===
No.	Title	Directed by	Written by	Original release date
1	"The Haunting of Connelly's Nook"	Jim Field Smith	Nick Frost, Simon Pegg, James Serafinowicz, and Nat Saunders	30 October 2020
Mrs. Connelly calls Smyle to repair her Smart TV. Gus and Elton discover that the HDMI cable has been cut, but when replaced the TV displays an image of another room in the house. The image is traced to a secret laboratory hidden next to the upstairs study of her deceased father, a vet who unknown to Connelly had an obsession with separating the soul from the body. Gus mentions that Peter Toynbee has been proposing this theory for several years. In an attempt to do this Connelly's father vivisected their pet dog Pepper in 1965, and it is discovered in the secret lab - skeletal but still alive due to artificial organs – the image is seen through the dog's eyes. As Connelly stares into Pepper's eyes the two are surrounded by a soul-halo, but it is un-noticed by Gus and Elton, and the dog dies. Satisfied that they have solved both the TV signal and paranormal issue Gus and Elton leave. As Connelly waves goodbye an ethereal voice is heard calling Pepper, and the woman reverts to all fours and bounds down the hall and up the stairs in a doglike fashion, suggesting Pepper's soul has moved to the woman's body. As they drive away it is shown that Astrid is hidden in the back of the van.
2	"The Watcher on the Water"	Jim Field Smith	Nick Frost, Simon Pegg, James Serafinowicz, and Nat Saunders	30 October 2020
The flashback shows a prototype radar jamming device – the Ellexatron – in World War II being activated. An air raid begins and the soldier on lookout calls in the alert code, but the Ellexatron's aerial is struck by lightning killing him and transferring his soul-halo to the Ellexatron itself. In a panic the scientists flee the installation. Back in the current day, Gus and Elton are sent to fix the broadband connection at The Portland Beacon, "the only horror themed hotel on Dorset's Jurassic Coast". Gus believes the hotel to be a gimmick, but admits that the lack of mobile and wifi signal is strange. After conversation with Byron the caretaker Elton is overcome by curiosity and enters the forbidden "Room 2" which is found to have a secret passageway down to the basement. Looking further the two find several skeletons of dead scientists and the Ellexatron, still working, and still occupied by the soul of the soldier unaware that the war has ended. Elton persuades the soldier that Britain won, giving him incentive to leave the Ellexatron through a metaphysical door. As he leaves, the Ellexatron powers down and David at Smyle HQ notices that mobile coverage in the area goes from 0% to 100%. As they drive back to Gus' house Gus questions Elton, pointing out that Elton originally said he was from Norfolk, but told the Ellexatron he was from Leicestershire – however further conversation is cut off as Astrid confronts them pleading for their help.
3	"The Girl with All the Ghosts"	Jim Field Smith	Nick Frost, Simon Pegg, James Serafinowicz, and Nat Saunders	30 October 2020
In the 17th century, a heretical cleric is trying to interest a publisher in his book, the Praecepta Mortuorum. A witchfinder and his group interrupt the two, tearing the last page from the Praecepta, killing the publisher and abducting the cleric. Un-noticed, a barmaid steals the abandoned Praecepta. Back in the current day, Astrid explains her haunting and circumstances to Gus and Elton, who decide that Astrid would benefit from a seance held by Janey Feathers, a combination of medium, massage therapist and, by innuendo, prostitute. Despite appearances, Janey is a skilled medium, and current owner of the Praecepta which she recognises as a powerful artefact. The seance goes wrong, damaging Janey's static caravan home, and causing her to declare that Astrid's ghosts are dangerously malevolent spirits. She demands that the trio leave. In the confusion, Gus takes the Praecepta to examine later. Deciding to exorcise Astrid's ghosts using parts of the Praecepta translated by Gus' dead wife the three return to the hospital Astrid awoke in. Partway through the incantation Gus is distracted by the presence of his wife's spirit and Elton has to read the last part of the exorcism directly from the Praecepta, completing it just before the spirits reach Astrid. After the exorcism is finalised, Astrid is a changed person, happier and saying she "feels alive". Elton invites her to stay with him, but has to work hard to persuade Helen to agree.
4	"The Incident at CovColCosCon"	Jim Field Smith	Nick Frost, Simon Pegg, James Serafinowicz, and Nat Saunders	30 October 2020
The flashback shows a young Peter Toynbee and Dr. Connolly performing experiments on a rat, having inserted a nanobot into its eye. They successfully control its behaviour, then by using an incantation they extract and capture its soul-halo into a radio set, killing the rat in the process. Back in the current day, Elton and Astrid are helping Helen prepare for Coventry Collectibles & Cosplay Convention – "CovColCosCon". When Gus discovers that a now adult Dr. Toynbee is to hold a seminar, he decides to go as well. Gus' father – Richard – also tags along when he recognises Helen from her YouTube channel, and the two become friends. Once at the convention several events occur, all intermingled with each other: A mix-up with the tickets means that Richard is allowed into the seminar, and Gus is turned away. Helen is too agoraphobic to leave the van – in five years the car park is the closest she has ever made it to the convention. Elton and Astrid are invited to an "immersive horror" experience, and decide that it can't be any worse than the real thing, so follow along behind some cosplay hooded monks to join in. Richard finds Toynbee ridiculous, but Toynbee begins an incantation that places the audience into a trance. Gus makes a deal with Helen – he wears her Dalek costume, allowing her to win the cosplay competition by proxy, and she will improve his channel. Astrid and Elton do not realise the hooded monks are real and using the missing Praecepta page to facilitate Toynbee's indoctrination. They interrupt the process, and leave, accidentally causing the death of one of the monks. Back in the auditorium Toynbee and his cohorts implant nanobots into the eyes of all audience members, including Richard. Waking up Richard feels no different, and upon leaving the group consider it a good day – apart from Richard who says he found Toynbee so boring he nodded off.
5	"The Ghost of the Beast of Bodmin"	Jim Field Smith	Nick Frost, Simon Pegg, James Serafinowicz, and Nat Saunders	30 October 2020
The flashback shows Toynbee infiltrating a research establishment and using the dismembered body parts of a scientist to bypass security and steal the missing Praecepta page. Back in the current day, Astrid tells Gus and Elton that they have a tip-off regarding the Beast of Bodmin Moor from a new subscriber called "Jojo74". The trio travel down to Cornwall to investigate. Meanwhile, Toynbee and his assistant Elara kill one of the implanted followers as a test of the nanobots' ability. The trio identify the location of the beast's sighting from an abandoned Happy Eater in the background, and after being chased by the unseen beast break in to take cover. Elton discovers a hidden passage behind a vending machine, prompting Gus to comment "What is it with you and secret doors?" before following it. Back at Gus' house Helen has arrived to work on his channel and makes conversation with Richard who is smitten with her putting her anxieties at ease. She notices his inflamed eye from the nanobot injection and thinking it to be an irritation asks if she can take a photo to use as the basis of a cosplay zombie. The camera flash reacts with the nanobot, but neither notice. In the Happy Eater basement the trio confront Jojo74 who admits that the beast is a hoax she perpetuates, and cryptically tells Gus that he is on to something and should choose his side as Smyle's new 6G rollout is intended to enslave humanity. Gus compliments her on including Toynbee's book in her collection, but she derides him as a hack. The trio find Jojo74 intimidating, and leave, but agree to keep her secret regarding the Beast. At Gus' house Helen finishes and Richard examines his eye in the mirror – the nanobot activates and he sees a brief flashback of the indoctrination process but dismisses it.
6	"The Revenge of the Chichester Widow"	Jim Field Smith	Nick Frost, Simon Pegg, James Serafinowicz, and Nat Saunders	30 October 2020
The flashback is to 1868, showing the basement of an insane asylum – the Chichester Institute – and the execution of Mary Colford for the murder of 12 men. Colford owns the Praecepta Mortuorum and uses it to curse Dr. Kettering who condemns her, but she is killed before completion and her soul-halo moves into a stuffed toy. Back in the current day, Gus and Elton are installing wifi at the institute which is being converted into apartments. Astrid, Elton and Gus intend to do a livestream using body cameras and split up with Astrid and Gus entering the building while Elton monitors signal strength from the van. Back at Gus' house, Richard and Helen talk about Emily with Gus overhearing due to the livestream. Meanwhile, and elsewhere, Toynbee identifies an abandoned power station as the location where ley lines converge for his plan, but is interrupted when Elara realises they have a phone signal – unknown to them caused by the deactivation of the Ellexatron at Beacon's Point. In the attic, Astrid finds a room containing a book labelled 'Dr. Kettering' and tools, including the "Heretic's Fork" used to execute Colford. Meanwhile, Gus enters the basement, dropping out of signal range. He finds Colford's possessed toy which both torments and pleads with Gus asking him to help her escape, and that everybody is lying to him. The others arrive, including the new owner of the building – Mr. Kettering – but promptly leave except for Kettering as Gus runs out of the basement. The spirit forces Kettering to use the Heretic's Fork to kill himself as revenge for Colford's death. Back at Gus' house he checks his paranormal library, and realises that Elton could be "The Hinckley Boy" – the most haunted boy in the country.
7	"The Hinckley Boy"	Jim Field Smith	Nick Frost, Simon Pegg, James Serafinowicz, and Nat Saunders	30 October 2020
The flashback shows a young boy named Lionel being haunted in the basement of his house while trying to empty the washing machine. Back in the current day, Gus confronts Elton who admits to being The Hinckley Boy, and that his real name is Lionel Ritchie. Due to the media circus (including Emily) surrounding him, he and his family constantly moved around the country to avoid attention. The trio persuade him to return to his family home and attempt to exorcise the spirits. Once there Elton says that the house feels "nice" and is not what he expected. Gus believes that it is because Elton himself is the focus, not the house, and lists all the paranormal experiences he's had since meeting him. He returns to the van to gather more equipment. Once he is gone, spirits manifest and Elton begins to panic. Astrid calms him, revealing that she has been dead for the last 23 years, and was a spirit herself trapped between worlds – but it was Elton who brought her back to the world of the living when he completed the exorcism in the hospital. The burning ghost transforms into Astrid's mother who confirms that Astrid is a living ghost, and Elton is a conduit to the dead. Outside, Gus meets Emily's spirit, who tells him that Toynbee intends to use the eclipse to bring about a catastrophe, and that he was responsible for her death. Meanwhile, Toynbee is planning his ascension to Eternis and activates the nanobots, causing Richard to leave the house and head towards the power station. Toynbee is concerned over the 6G signal which will block their passage, and commands Elara to embrace the Ellexatron transmitter while he induces an electrical storm. The aerial is again struck by lightning, killing Elara, and her soul-halo moves into the Ellexatron. Helen alerts the trio of Richard's behaviour, and they head to the power station, picking her up on the way.
8	"The Shadow of the Moon"	Jim Field Smith	Nick Frost, Simon Pegg, James Serafinowicz, and Nat Saunders	30 October 2020
The flashback shows that ten years earlier Emily and Toynbee were working together to ascend to Eternis, but Toynbee betrayed and killed her as a dry run to ensure his calculations were correct for the next eclipse. Back in the current day, the trio have picked up Helen and are outside the power station. Gus receives calls from both Jojo74 and David, each asking for his help to prevent Toynbee but in a mutually exclusive manner. Gus believes David and they split up – Astrid and Elton return to Beacon's Point to deactivate the Elara-possessed Ellexatron while Gus and Helen infiltrate the power station using Helen's make-up skills to imitate the nanobots. Elton uses his ability as a conduit to the dead and sends Astrid into the Ellexatron so she can duel Elara and shut it down. Helen is caught and implanted with a nanobot, but Gus takes the place of one of Toynbee's assistants. Meanwhile back at Smyle HQ David and his assistant Bjorn race to deploy an advanced 8G wireless network as David – who knows all about Toynbee and the paranormal – says the 8G frequencies will disrupt the nanobots and shut them down. Astrid successfully defeats Elara on the metaphysical plane, but Elton is unable to bring her back to reality. Toynbee discovers Gus and defeats him in a fist fight, but is delayed long enough for David to activate the 8G network. At the same time Toynbee cuts his own throat and activates the nanobots the 8G signal reaches 100%, preventing the nanobots from detonating and Toynbee dies in vain. Gus, Elton, Richard and Helen all leave in the van glad that they foiled Toynbee's plan, but sad over the loss of Astrid. Back at Smyle, David is visited by Jojo, now in a business suit and through conversation reveal that the two are other-worldly beings (David has modelled his appearance on the male human from the Pioneer plaque) and are involved in a long-running personal contest. Jojo admits that using Toynbee was a mistake, but sympathises over David's loss and that "his precious Astrid had to cross over". David agrees, and says he "would not like to be her right now", and the two leave his office. As they depart, the picture on the wall behind his desk morphs into a human face and Astrid's voice says "Hello?"

== Development ==
In January 2018, it was announced that Stolen Picture was developing their first television project Truth Seekers, a half-hour comedy-horror series about a three-person paranormal investigation team. In August 2019, Amazon Prime Video signed a full series order on Truth Seekers. The series starred Simon Pegg and Nick Frost, alongside Emma D'Arcy, Samson Kayo, Malcolm McDowell, Susie Wokoma, and Julian Barratt. Jim Field Smith directed all 8 episodes of the first season. On 19 October 2020, executive producer and Stolen Picture CEO Miles Ketley passed away 11 days before the series premiere.

== Release ==
=== Streaming ===
On 23 July 2020, during San Diego Comic-Con@Home, the first trailer was released.

The first two episodes premiered at the CannesSeries Festival, on 10 October 2020, followed by a 30 October 2020 wide release on Amazon Prime Video. The series was canceled by Prime Video in February 2021.

=== Critical reception ===
On Rotten Tomatoes, the series has an approval rating of 76% based on reviews from 38 critics, with an average rating of 6.89/10. The website's critics consensus reads, "It may not be as laugh-out-loud funny as Nick Frost and Simon Pegg's previous collaborations, but Truth Seekers is genuinely eerie, balancing out its silly sensibilities with creeping terror and a scary talented cast." On Metacritic, the series has a weighted average score of 60 out of 100 based on reviews from ten critics, indicating "mixed or average reviews".
