= Mommy's Little Monster =

Mommy's Little Monster may refer to:

- Mommy's Little Monster (album), a 1983 album by Social Distortion
- "Mommy's Little Monster" (Gotham), a 2015 episode of the television series Gotham

== See also ==
- "Daddy's Little Monster", a 2012 episode of the television series Adventure Time
