= Little Monsters (game show) =

British game show

- Genre: Game show
- Presented by: Jayne Sharp
- Country of origin: United Kingdom
- Original language: English
- No. of series: 1
- No. of episodes: 10

Production
- Running time: 60 minutes (inc. adverts)
- Production company: Princess Productions

Original release
- Network: Sky One
- Release: 4 September – 6 November 2003

Little Monsters is a British game show that aired on Sky One from the 4th of September to the 6th of November in 2003.

== Premise ==
On a riverside wharf and abandoned warehouse in London, five misbehaving children take control of five unfortunate adults while they compete in a series of painful, messy and most of all humiliating games in order for the chance to play for £1,000.

The "monsters" consist of five 10 year olds. (Adsy, Bigfoot, Flip, JJ and Scuds)

Five adults start the game, and after each game they are awarded points based on their performance or position in the game. 10 points is awarded to the winner and zero points for the adult who comes last, but other points vary for middle positions, The Monsters take control of the adults at all times and they can punish any adult for any reason at any time of the game and can occasionally award extra points during punishments. After a certain number of games, the adult who has the lowest overall score is eliminated from the show and has to walk the plank into the River Thames. When four adults have been eliminated, the surviving adult will compete against the Monsters in the final round the 'Nightmare Playground' where they must tackle five crazy obstacles. (Seesaws, Skateboards, Suspended wobbly bridges, climbing wall and a tightrope) with each obstacle they must attempt to grab some of the prize money that are in £100 bags. After the adult has finished the course, they have to make a final decision by running through one of two doors (one is bricked up and one is made of paper). If they go through the wrong door then the adult will lose half of their winnings, but if they go through the correct door then they get to escape and leave the Monsters' wharf with all their winnings.
