= Sara Pascoe =

English comedian, presenter, writer (born 1981)

- Pascoe in 2026
- Born: Sara Patricia Pascoe; 22 May 1981 (age 45); Dagenham, London, England
- Education: University of Sussex (BA)
- Spouse: Steen Raskopoulos (m. 2020)
- Children: 2
- Parent: Derek Pascoe

Comedy career
- Years active: 2006–present
- Medium: Stand-up; television
- Website: sarapascoe.co.uk

Sara Patricia Pascoe (born 22 May 1981) is an English comedian, actress, presenter and writer. She has appeared on television programmes including 8 Out of 10 Cats Does Countdown and Taskmaster for Channel 4 and QI for BBC Two.

== Early life ==
Pascoe was born to Gail (née Newmarch) and Derek Pascoe, a singer and musician. Her great-grandmother was Rosa Newmarch, a poet and writer on music.

Born in Dagenham, London, Pascoe grew up in nearby Romford. Her parents divorced when she was seven and she was raised by her mother. She attended Eastbury Comprehensive School in Barking, and later attended Gaynes School in Upminster. When she was 16 she became pregnant; she had an abortion on her 17th birthday, an experience detailed in her memoir, Animal: The Autobiography of a Female Body.

Pascoe studied English at the University of Sussex, where she befriended Cariad Lloyd. After graduation, she worked as an actor and supplemented her income with temporary work, but found work "hard to come by" and declared herself bankrupt.

== Career ==
Before her comedy career, Pascoe was a tour guide in London. She began performing stand up comedy in 2007. In 2008, Pascoe was a runner-up in the Funny Women award with Rachel Stubbings, losing out to Katherine Ryan. Around the same time, she secured acting roles in The Thick of It and Being Human, among others.

In August 2010, she performed her first show at the Edinburgh Festival Fringe, Sara Pascoe Vs Her Ego.

Pascoe's comedy career led to many television appearances on panel shows, including Stand Up for the Week, Mock the Week, QI, Have I Got News For You, Hypothetical, and Would I Lie to You. She was a regular guest on Frankie Boyle's Autopsy BBC programmes and Frankie Boyle's New World Order. In October 2014, she appeared in Never Mind the Buzzcocks and stood in line at the identity parade round as a former dancer and back-up singer for the entertainer (and Robbie Williams's father) Pete Conway. She participated in the third series of Taskmaster, which was broadcast on Dave in October and November 2016, and the first series of LOL: Last One Laughing UK in March 2025.

Her stand-up has been featured on Live at the Apollo and Live from the BBC.

As well as on television, she has appeared as a panellist on BBC Radio 4 programmes including The Infinite Monkey Cage, The Unbelievable Truth and Just A Minute.

Pascoe's acting roles on television have included The Increasingly Poor Decisions of Todd Margaret, Campus, Twenty Twelve and its sequel W1A, plus sketches for Stand Up to Cancer and as well as all-female sketch show, Girl Friday (part of Channel 4's Comedy Showcase), which she co-wrote.

In 2012, she appeared in episode 11 of the Comedian's Comedian Podcast hosted by Stuart Goldsmith.

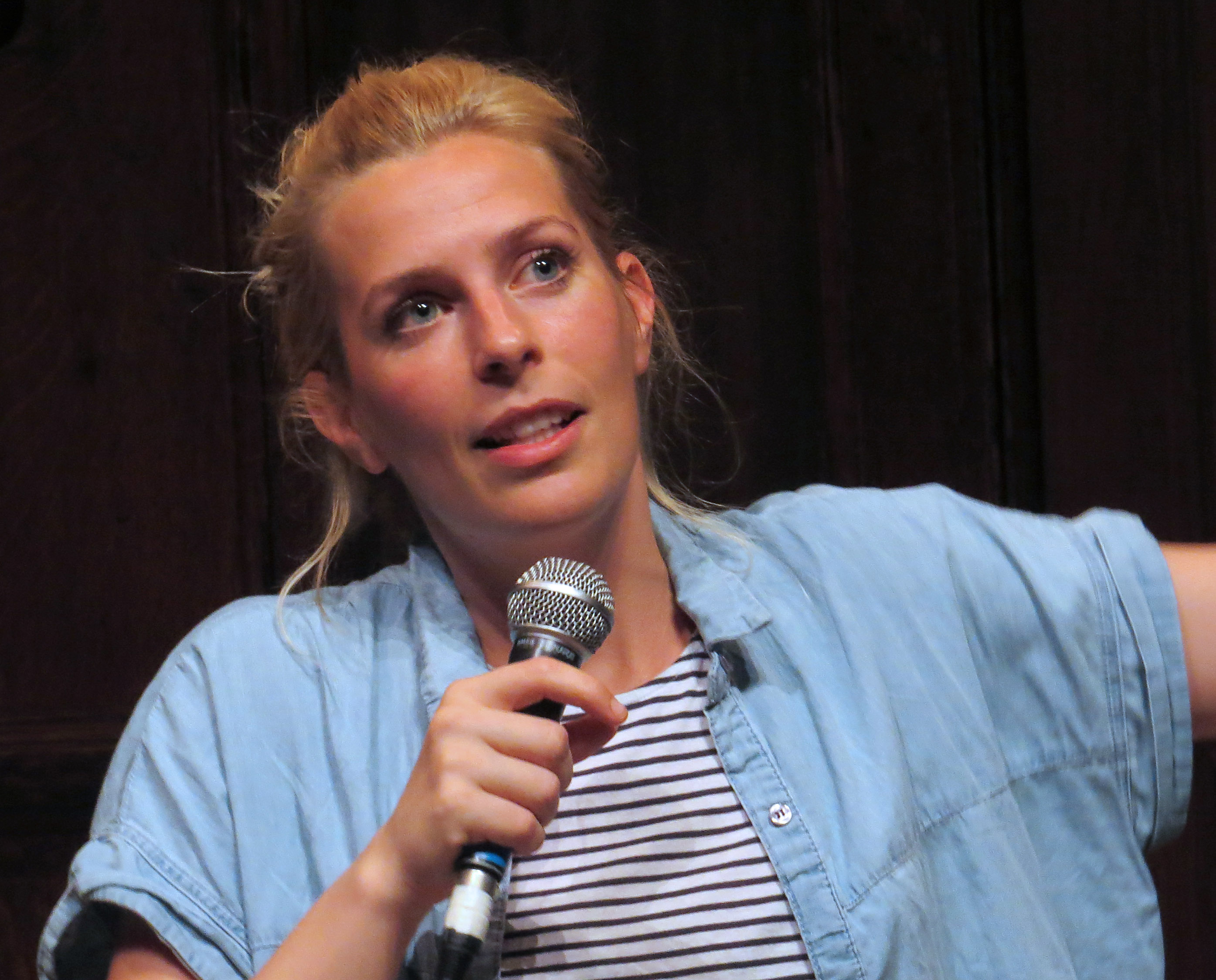
Pascoe in 2014

In 2014, she performed at the Edinburgh Festival Fringe and toured the UK for the first time with the show Sara Pascoe Vs History. The show was nominated for the Foster's Edinburgh Comedy Award 2014 for Best Comedy Show. In 2016, along with numerous other celebrities, Pascoe toured the UK to support Jeremy Corbyn's bid to become prime minister. The same year she toured with her show Animal.

On 27 October 2017, she appeared in an episode of the British travel documentary series Travel Man on Channel 4. In February 2018, she started a BBC Radio 4 series called Modern Monkey.

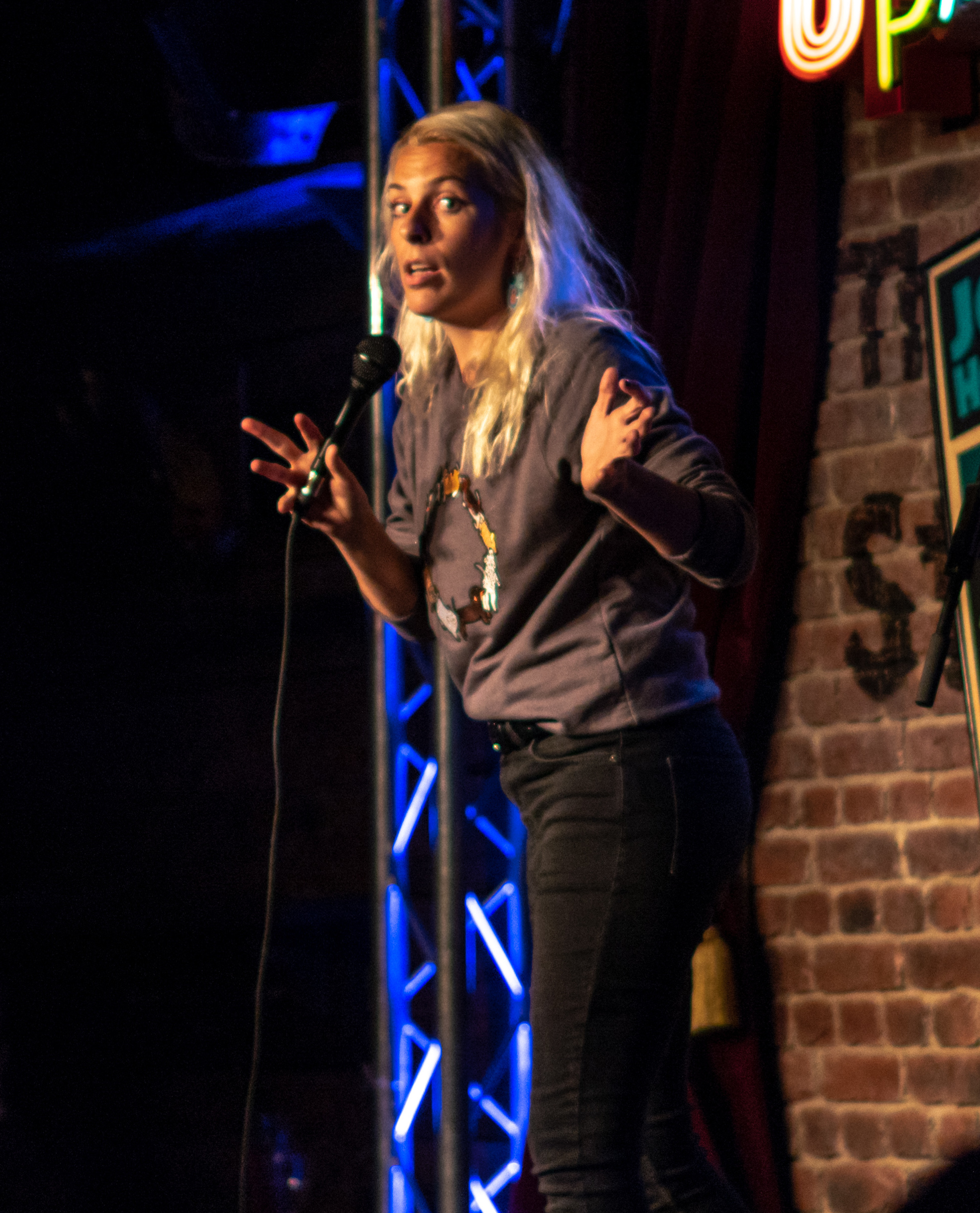
Pascoe performing at the Up the Creek comedy club in 2018

In May 2018, she starred in a BBC comedy short entitled "Sara Pascoe vs Monogamy".

In March 2019, she appeared in Travelling Blind with Amar Latif on BBC2.

In April 2019, a live recording of Pascoe's LadsLadsLads tour at the London Palladium was shown on BBC Two.

In November 2020, she hosted An Evening With Yuval Noah Harari, a livestream book launch held by How to Academy and Penguin Books.

Pascoe's six-part comedy series Out of Her Mind premiered on BBC Two in October 2020. Exploring "heartbreak, family and how to survive them", the series is loosely based on her own life, with Pascoe playing a version of herself. Co-stars include Juliet Stevenson and Cariad Lloyd.

Pascoe's three-part BBC Two series called Last Woman on Earth with Sara Pascoe premiered on 27 December 2020. In May 2022, the series was recommissioned for a second series, which premiered on 9 April 2023.

As a television host, Pascoe has presented the Dave series Comedians Giving Lectures, the panel show Guessable for Comedy Central UK, and The Great British Sewing Bee. Before presenting series 8, 9 and 11 of the latter, she was one of the competitors on a festive celebrity edition in 2020.

Pascoe has written three books. The first, Animal: The Autobiography of a Female Body, was published in 2016. Her second book, Sex Power Money (published in 2019), explores (mostly heterosexual) sexual relations, with particular focuses on male sexuality and prostitution. It is informed by evolutionary biology and social research, and by Pascoe's own experiences and feelings. She also hosts a related podcast of the same name, in which she interviews people who have experience of prostitution, stripping, and pornography.

Pascoe's debut novel, Weirdo, was published in 2024. It was shortlisted for the 'Published Novels' section of the 2025 Comedy Women in Print Prize and won the prize's inaugural Jilly Cooper Award.

== Other television appearances ==
In 2017, Pascoe was one of four contestants on series 7, episode 8 of The Celebrity Chase, progressing to the episode's Final Chase.

In 2025, Pascoe appeared on A Bite To Eat With Alice (Australia).

== Personal life ==
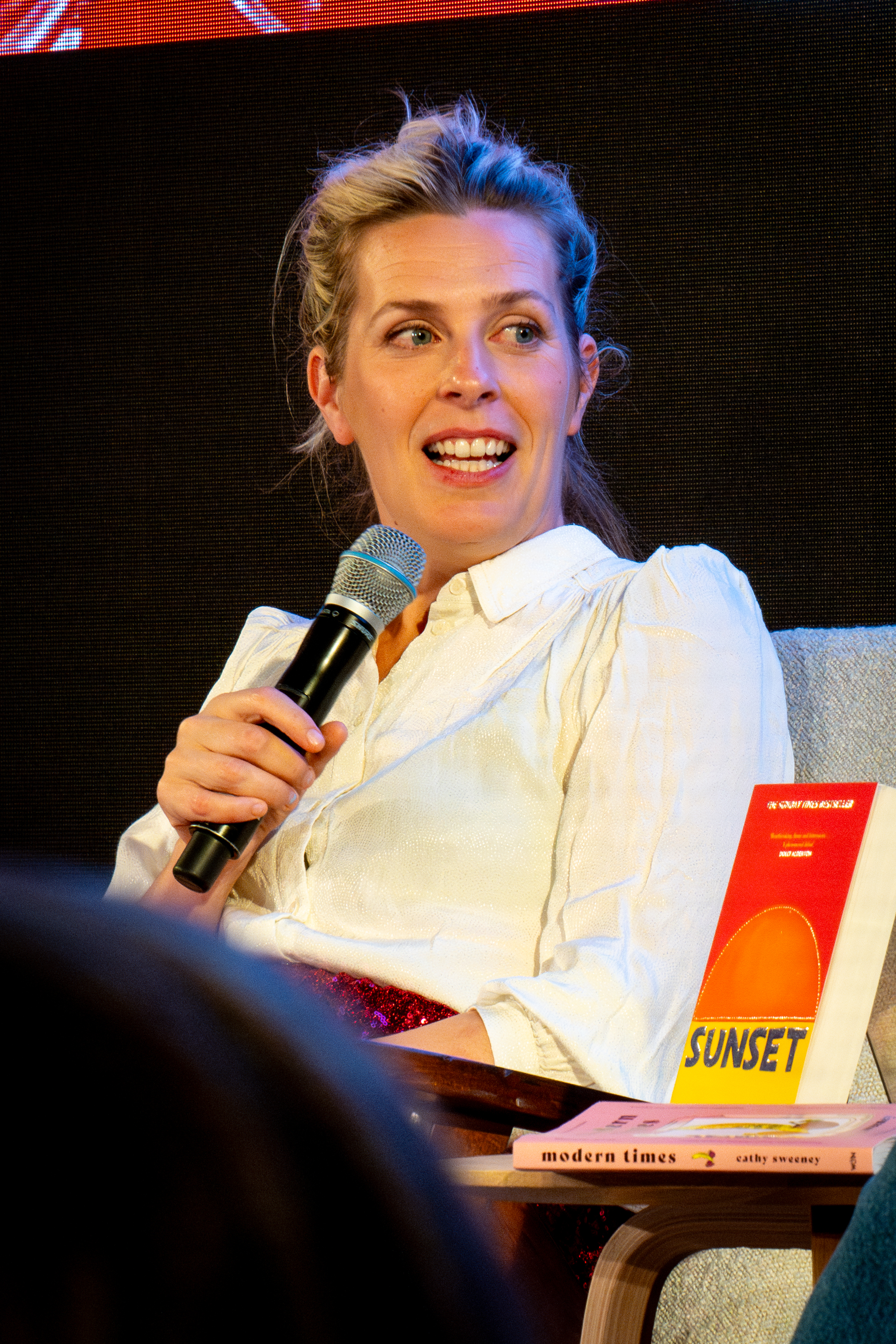
Pascoe in 2024

Pascoe lives in Crouch End, north London. From 2013 to late 2016, she dated the comedian John Robins. Her reflections on that relationship and its aftermath were the basis of her 2017 show LadsLadsLads at the Edinburgh Festival Fringe. In 2020, she married fellow comedian Steen Raskopoulos. In February 2022, Pascoe gave birth to her first son. Her second son was born in 2023. She is vegan.

== Bibliography ==
- 2016, Animal: The Autobiography of a Female Body
- 2019, Sex Power Money
- 2023, Weirdo
