= Nick Frost =

English actor, comedian and screenwriter (born 1972)

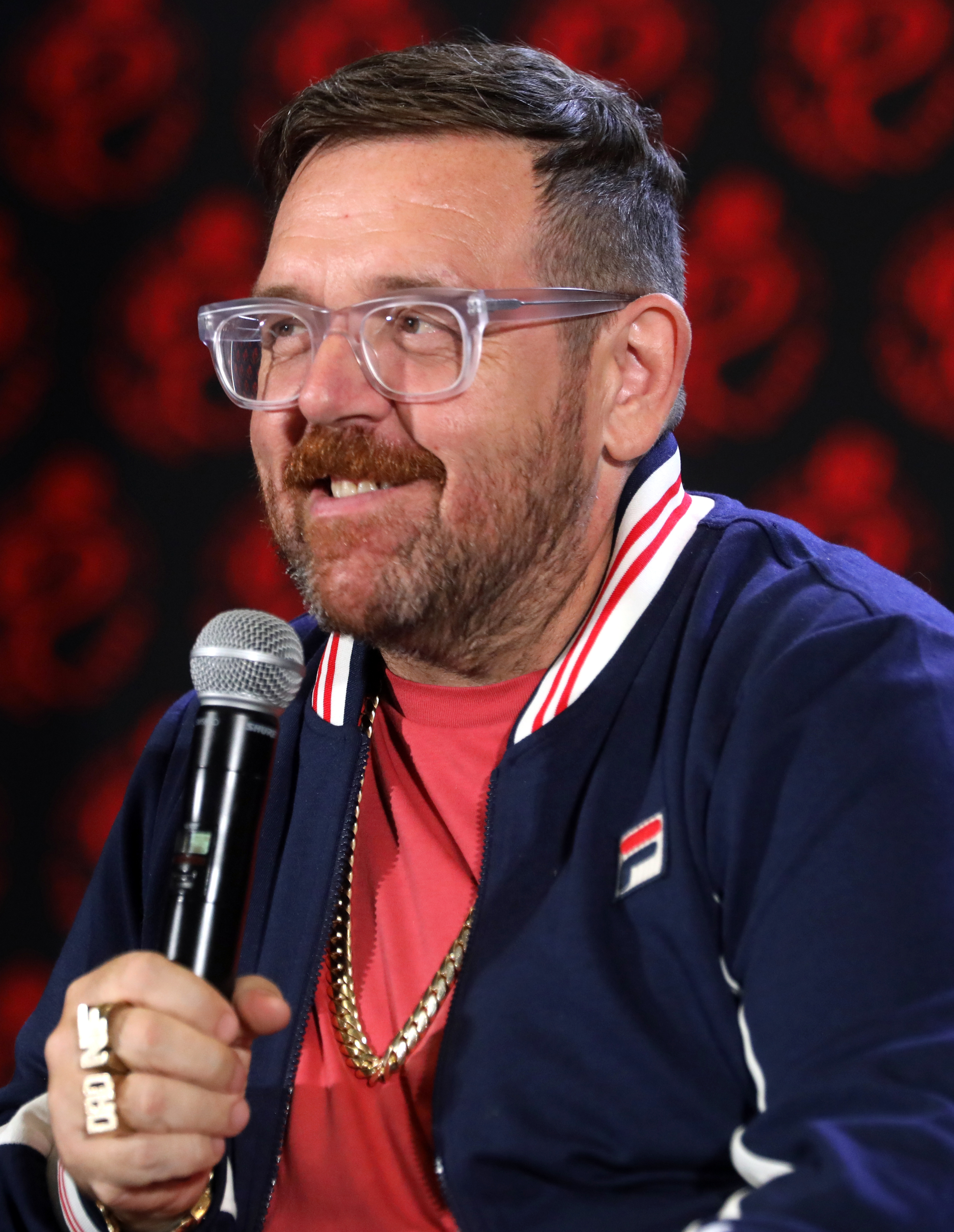
- Frost in 2024
- Born: Nicholas John Frost; 28 March 1972 (age 54); Hornchurch, Greater London, England
- Education: Beal High School
- Occupations: Actor, comedian, writer
- Years active: 1998–present
- Spouse: Mariangela Frost (m. 2008; div. 2015)
- Children: 3

Nicholas John Frost (born 28 March 1972) is an English actor, comedian and screenwriter. He has appeared in the Three Flavours Cornetto trilogy of films, consisting of Shaun of the Dead (2004), Hot Fuzz (2007), and The World's End (2013), and the television comedy Spaced (1999–2001). He also appeared in Joe Cornish's film Attack the Block (2011). He co-starred in the 2011 film Paul, which he co-wrote with friend and frequent collaborator Simon Pegg. He has also portrayed various roles in the sketch show Man Stroke Woman. In 2020, he co-created and starred in the paranormal comedy horror series Truth Seekers with Pegg.

== Early life ==
Frost was born on 28 March 1972 in Hornchurch, Greater London; he is the son of John Frost and his Welsh wife, Tricia (died 2005), who were office furniture designers. When he was 10, his sister died of an asthma attack, aged 18. He attended Beal High School in Ilford. When Frost was 15, his parents' business failed and they lost the family home. They moved in with neighbours where he witnessed his mother having a stroke due to the stress. Frost left school and took a job with a shipping company to support the family. He subsequently spent two years at a kibbutz in Israel. He met actor Simon Pegg while working as a waiter at a North London Chiquito branch and the two became close friends and flatmates. Pegg and Jessica Hynes wrote a role for Frost in the cult slacker comedy series Spaced; the series was partly based on Pegg and Frost's lifestyle at the time.

== Career ==
He appeared in corporate training video clips such as "Chris Carter and the Coverplan Challenge", a Dixons sales video, before playing Tim's army-obsessed best friend Mike in Spaced (1999–2001), which aired on Channel 4 for two series. In 2001, Frost played a small role in a one-off episode of Victoria Wood's Acorn Antiques. This was a specially written episode shown during the series called "The Sketch Show Story" that Victoria narrated, in which Frost played an armed robber who shot dead Acorn Antiques' most lovable character, Mrs Overall.

In 2002, Frost wrote and presented the show Danger! 50,000 Volts!, a spoof of the outdoors survival genre in which military experts demonstrate how to improvise solutions to dangerous problems. In the same year, Frost co-wrote and starred in The Sofa of Time with Matt King. In 2004, he appeared in Shaun of the Dead, a "romantic zombie comedy" written by Simon Pegg and Spaced director Edgar Wright. In late 2005, Frost starred in the comedy sketch show Man Stroke Woman on BBC Three. A second series aired on in early 2007. In early 2006, Frost played Commander Henderson in two series of the BBC Two science fiction sitcom, Hyperdrive. Also in 2006, he acted in Kinky Boots. Frost had a small appearance in the British comedy Look Around You, a parody of 1970s/1980s technology parodying the format of shows like Tomorrow's World.

Frost and Pegg appeared in a second Pegg-Wright feature film called Hot Fuzz, an action and cop genre homage, set in Gloucestershire. Frost plays bumbling Constable Danny Butterman, who partners up with Pegg's dynamic Nicholas Angel after the latter is transferred from the Metropolitan Police in London. The pair teamed up again for their self-penned 2011 science-fiction comedy film Paul, whose storyline concerns a fugitive alien. The two also starred in Steven Spielberg's The Adventures of Tintin: Secret of the Unicorn as Thomson and Thompson. Frost narrates the Channel 4 reality show Supernanny. He has made fleeting appearances on the Channel 4 surreal medical comedy series Green Wing as "just a man" in pub scenes (when Boyce asks who he is, he responds, "just a man"). In 2013, Frost played the role of Andy Knightley in the third Pegg-Wright feature film called The World's End. In 2014, he played the eponymous character in the Sky Atlantic comedy Mr. Sloane.

In October 2015, Frost released a memoir titled Truths, Half Truths & Little White Lies (Hodder & Stoughton); the book details his life up to the age of 30. In 2016, Frost was cast in an ensemble role for the second season of the AMC television series Into the Badlands. In January 2024, Frost was announced to play Gobber the Belch in the live-action remake of How to Train Your Dragon. Frost will portray Rubeus Hagrid in the HBO television adaptation of the Harry Potter series.

== Personal life ==
Frost is best friends with fellow actor Simon Pegg and the two have appeared alongside each other in six films. In a 2005 interview, Frost stated that he was brought up as a Catholic but is now an atheist. Frost is a patron of Humanists UK. He is a supporter of West Ham United and the England national football team, as well as being a rugby player, formerly playing for Barking RFC.

Frost lived with his half-Swedish wife, production executive Mariangela, in St Margarets, London. They married in 2008. He previously lived in Finsbury Park, which was also one of the filming locations for Shaun of the Dead. They separated in 2013, and later divorced.

== Filmography ==
=== Film ===
Year	Title	Role	Notes	Ref.
2004	Shaun of the Dead	Ed		
2005	Kinky Boots	Don		
2006	Penelope	Max Campion		
2007	Grindhouse	Baby eater	Segment: Don't	
2007	Hot Fuzz	PC Danny Butterman		
2008	Wild Child	Mr. Christopher		
2009	The Boat That Rocked	Dave		
2011	Paul	Clive Gollings	Also co-writer	
2011	Attack the Block	Ron		
2011	The Adventures of Tintin: The Secret of the Unicorn	Thomson	Motion-capture	
2012	Snow White and the Huntsman	Nion		
2012	Ice Age: Continental Drift	Flynn	Voice	
2013	The World's End	Andy Knightley	Also executive producer	
2014	Cuban Fury	Bruce Garrett	Also executive producer	
2014	The Boxtrolls	Mr. Trout	Voice	
2015	Unfinished Business	Bill Whilmsley		
2015	Syrenia	Dr. Welles		
2016	The Huntsman: Winter's War	Nion		
2016	Asterix: The Mansions of the Gods	Obelix	English dub	
2017	Monster Family	Frank Wishbone	Voice	
2018	Tomb Raider	Alan	Uncredited	
2018	The Festival	Ricky the Tattooist		
2018	Slaughterhouse Rulez	Woody	Also executive producer	
2019	Fighting with My Family	Ricky Knight		
2019	Horrible Histories: The Movie – Rotten Romans	Arghus		
2019	StarDog and TurboCat	Buddy	Voice	
2021	The Sparks Brothers	Ringo Starr	Voice	
2021	Extinct	Captain	Voice	
2021	Scooby-Doo! The Sword and the Scoob	Merlin	Voice	
2021	Trollhunters: Rise of the Titans	Stuart	Voice	
2021	Monster Family 2	Frank Wishbone	Voice	
2024	Krazy House	Bernie		
2024	Seize Them!	Bobik		
2024	Get Away	Richard	Also writer and producer	
2024	Timestalker	George		
2024	Black Cab	Ian		
2024	How to Date Billy Walsh	William		
2025	How to Train Your Dragon	Gobber the Belch		
2025	Grow	Arlo		
2025	Whistle	Mr. Craven		
2027	How to Train Your Dragon 2	Gobber the Belch	Post-production	

=== Television ===
Year	Title	Role	Notes	Ref.
1998	Big Train	Construction Worker / Engineer	2 episodes	
2000	Black Books	Security System Installer	1 episode	
1999–2001	Spaced	Mike Watt	14 episodes	
2000, 2004	Black Books	Security System Man / Paul	Voice, 2 episodes	
2001	Acorn Antiques	Armed robber	Television special	
2002	Danger! 50,000 Volts!	Himself	Host, 4 episodes	
2003	Danger! Incoming Attack!	Himself	Host, 4 episodes	
2005	Twisted Tales	Keith	Episode: "Txt Msg Rcvd"	
2005	Look Around You	Caveman / Hot Jon	2 episodes	
2005	Spider-Plant Man	Scientist	Television short	
2005–2007	Man Stroke Woman	Various characters	12 episodes	
2005–2008	Supernanny	Narrator	Voice, 26 episodes	
2006	Green Wing	Just a Man	Episode #2.1	
2006–2007	Hyperdrive	Commander Henderson	12 episodes	
2010	Money	John Self	2 episodes	
2011, 2014	Phineas and Ferb	Captain Squint / Ed	Voice, 2 episodes	
2014	Mr. Sloane	Jeremy Sloane	6 episodes; also executive producer	
2014	Mr Drew's School for Boys	Narrator (voice)	4 episodes	
2014	Sober Companion	Robert	Pilot	
2014	Doctor Who	Santa Claus	2 episodes; Last Christmas and Death in Heaven (cameo)	
2016	Galavant	Andre	Episode: "Giants vs. Dwarves"	
2017–2018	Sick Note	Dr. Ian Glennis	14 episodes	
2017–2019	Into the Badlands	Bajie	24 episodes	
2018–2019	3Below	Stuart	Voice, 19 episodes	
2020	Out of Her Mind	—N/a	6 episodes; executive producer only	
2020	Truth Seekers	Gus	8 episodes; also co-creator, writer and executive producer	
2021	Staged	Himself	Episode: "The Dirty Mochyns"	
2021	Why Women Kill	Bertram	10 episodes	
2021–2023	The Nevers	Declan Orrun	Main cast	
2023	Scott Pilgrim Takes Off	Studio Security Guard #2 (voice)	2 episodes	
2024–2025	Star Wars: Skeleton Crew	SM-33 (voice)	Main role	
2025	Transaction	Simon	6 episodes	
2026–present	Harry Potter	Rubeus Hagrid	Upcoming; main cast	

=== Radio ===
Year	Title	Role	Notes	Ref.
2002	The Sofa of Time	Parker	Also co-creator and writer	

=== Video games ===
Year	Title	Role	Ref.
2012	Ice Age: Continental Drift - Arctic Games	Flynn	
2015	Esper 2	Ernie	
2017	Augmented Empire	Chris	

== Awards and nominations ==
Year	Award	Category	Work	Result	Ref.
2004	British Independent Film Awards	BIFA for Most Promising Newcomer	Shaun of the Dead	Nominated	
2005	Fangoria Chainsaw Awards	Best Supporting Actor	Shaun of the Dead	Won	
2011	National Movie Awards	NMA Performance of the Year	Paul	Nominated	
2015	Behind the Voice Actors Awards	Best Vocal Ensemble in a Feature Film	The Boxtrolls (shared)	Won	
2014	2014 MTV Movie Awards	MTV Movie Award for Best Fight (shared with Simon Pegg, Paddy Considine, & Martin Freeman	The World's End	Nominated	
2014	2014 Teen Choice Awards	Choice Movie: Hissy Fit	The World's End	Nominated	
2014	2014 Teen Choice Awards	Choice Movie: Award for Best Fight (shared with Simon Pegg, Paddy Considine, & Martin Freeman	The World's End	Nominated	
2014	2014 Teen Choice Awards	Choice Movie: Award for Best Chemistry (shared with Simon Pegg, Paddy Considine, Martin Freeman and Eddie Marsan	The World's End	Nominated	
2019	Women Film Critics Circle Awards	Best Screen Couple Shared with: Lena Headey	Fighting with My Family	Nominated	
