= Sex Power Money =

2019 non-fiction book

- Front cover
- Author: Sara Pascoe
- Genre: Non-fiction
- Publisher: Faber and Faber
- Publication date: 28 August 2019
- ISBN: 9780571335992

Sex Power Money is a 2019 book by Sara Pascoe and the name of a related podcast which Pascoe hosts. The book discusses sex through the medium of evolutionary psychology, sex work and public perceptions towards it and the role of money and capital in modern heterosexual relationships. It is Pascoe's second book, following Animal (2016). In the podcast, Pascoe has conversations with sex workers, academics and comedians. The book and podcast received positive critical reception and the book entered The Sunday Times' bestseller list.

== Background ==
External videos
- "Sara Pascoe introduces her new book" Promotional video by Faber and Faber.

Sara Pascoe is an English comedian and actor, known for her appearances on panel shows. In 2014, she began exploring the topic of evolutionary psychology with a stand-up show Sara Pascoe vs History. Her first book was titled Animal: The Autobiography of a Female Body. Published in 2016, on the topic of relationships and the female body, it is about her own experiences and opinions as well as biology and psychology. In July 2017, Faber and Faber announced the acquisition of Pascoe's second book, Sex Power Money, initially scheduled to be published in August 2018. The book was published in hardback on 29 August 2019; a paperback edition was released on 20 August 2020.

Originally, Pascoe had planned for her second book to be about cultural depictions of the male body, under the name Manimals, but she found fewer "mysteries" about the male body than the female body. Pascoe said that research for Animal had led her to be interested in topics such as sex work and domestic violence from perspectives other than feminist theory, as she found that many such issues had financial status as a larger cause of vulnerability than gender. When discussing the topic of pornography, she sought to write something "balanced" rather than wholly negative, finding a lack of conclusive evidence for some proposed negatives of pornography. She aimed to consider trans perspectives and avoid alienating such readers.

== Synopsis ==
The book has three sections: "Sex Power Biology", about analysing human behaviour through evolutionary facts; "Sex Power Porn", about pornography and cultural attitudes towards the human body; and "Sex Power Money Money Money", about the role of money and capital in modern heterosexual relationships. Pascoe concludes that human sexual behaviour cannot be fully attributed to either evolutionary instinct or rational behaviour. The book is dedicated to Arminda Ventura, who was murdered by her husband after attempting to divorce him.

Pascoe discusses the term "sex worker" and the subject of sex work, commenting on the language used to describe people in the industry and her negative preconceptions towards female sex workers as victims and damaged. She researches survival sex and forums where men discuss sex workers. Pascoe also talks about Indecent Proposal, a film in which a man offers another man a large sum of money in return for having sex with his wife. She discusses transactional sex and rape culture, her own attitudes towards men and possible contributing factors for the behaviour of male rapists and abusers.

== Reception ==
The book was #5 on The Sunday Times' bestseller list on 8 September 2019.

Shirley Whiteside of The National lauded the book as "educational and highly entertaining", finding that it had an "engaging, conversational style of writing and an intriguing supply of curious facts". Niamh Donnelly of The Irish Times praised the book as "very funny" and well-researched, but found it stronger "when it's not analysing, not interrogating". i's Marisa Bate found that the book contained "an impressive amount of research" and summarised that in relation to the three title topics: "Pascoe might not have figured it out entirely, but she has given it a very good shot".

== Podcast ==
A companion podcast, also titled Sex Power Money, was produced by Faber and Faber. An initial run of eight episodes began on 12 August 2019. The podcast features Pascoe discussing sex work, pornography and sexual activity with sex workers, academics and comedians. A second series of eight episode began on 27 July 2020.

In 2019, The Guardian reviewed the podcast as the 12th-best podcast of the year, finding it "equally insightful" in comparison to the book. Guardian writers praised the episode with social historian Hallie Rubenhold as "far-reaching and fascinating". The podcast was nominated in the same year for a FutureBook Award.
