= Simon Pegg =

English actor (born 1970)

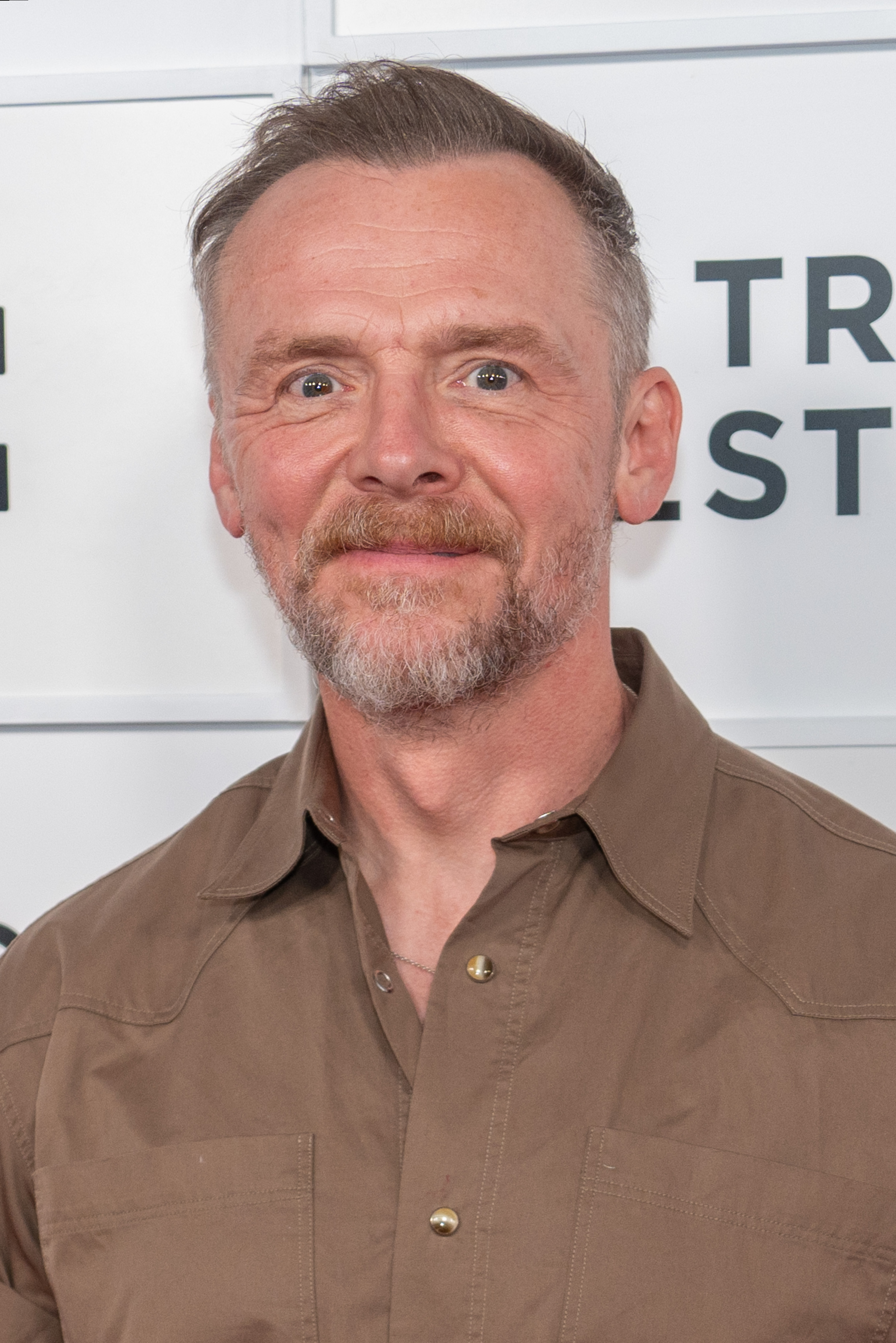
- Pegg in 2026
- Born: Simon John Beckingham; 14 February 1970 (age 56); Brockworth, Gloucestershire, England
- Education: University of Bristol (BA)
- Occupations: Actor; comedian; screenwriter; producer; DJ
- Years active: 1995–present
- Spouse: Maureen McCann (m. 2005)
- Children: 1

Simon John Pegg (né Beckingham; born 14 February 1970) is an English actor, comedian, screenwriter and DJ. He came to prominence in the UK as the co-creator of the Channel 4 sitcom Spaced (1999–2001), directed by Edgar Wright. He and Wright co-wrote the films Shaun of the Dead (2004), Hot Fuzz (2007), and The World's End (2013), known collectively as the Three Flavours Cornetto trilogy, all of which saw Wright directing and Pegg starring alongside Nick Frost. Pegg and Frost also wrote and starred in the sci-fi comedy film Paul (2011).

Pegg is one of the few performers to have achieved what Radio Times calls the "Holy Grail of Nerd-dom", having played popular supporting characters in Doctor Who (2005), Star Trek as Montgomery "Scotty" Scott (2009–2016), and Star Wars: The Force Awakens (2015). He starred as Benji Dunn in six Mission: Impossible films, beginning with Mission: Impossible III (2006) and ending with Mission: Impossible – The Final Reckoning (2025). He has also provided the voice of Buck in the Ice Age film series (2009–present).

== Early life ==
Simon John Pegg was born Simon John Beckingham on 14 February 1970 in Brockworth, Gloucestershire; he is the son of Gillian Rosemary (née Smith), a former civil servant, and John Henry Beckingham, a jazz musician and keyboard salesman. His parents divorced when he was seven, and he took on his stepfather's surname, Pegg, after his mother remarried. His brother, Mike (who starred in the 2020 film The Host), still uses Beckingham as his surname. He attended Castle Hill Primary School, Brockworth Comprehensive Secondary School, and The King's School, Gloucester.

Pegg moved to Stratford-upon-Avon, Warwickshire when he was 16 and studied English literature and theatre at Stratford-upon-Avon College. He graduated from the University of Bristol in 1991 with a BA degree in theatre, film, and television, titling his undergraduate dissertation "A Marxist overview of popular 1970s cinema and hegemonic discourses". While there, he performed as a member of a comedy troupe called "David Icke and the Orphans of Jesus", alongside David Walliams, Dominik Diamond, and Jason Bradbury.

"When I graduated from university where I studied theatre, film and television, I went into stand-up because comedy was something I enjoyed but also because it offered me a certain autonomy that I wouldn't have if I was sitting and waiting for the phone to ring as an actor. Then, I drifted into comedy acting through doing stand-up, and that was something that I really enjoyed. But, it wasn't the only thing I ever wanted to do. There was a time when I was younger where I just wanted to be at The Royal Shakespeare Theatre."

== Career ==
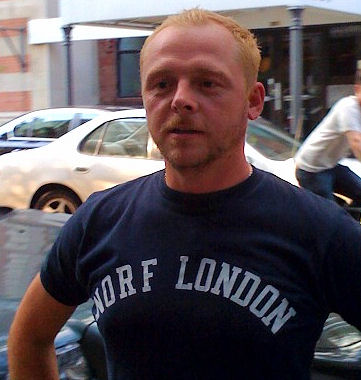
Pegg in New York City, July 2008

Pegg's early appearances in TV series and films include Six Pairs of Pants (Meridian & Anglia, 1995), Asylum, Faith in the Future, Big Train and Hippies. Between 1998 and 2004, Pegg was regularly featured on BBC Radio 4's The 99p Challenge. Pegg's other credits include appearances in the World War II mini-series Band of Brothers; the television comedies Black Books, Brass Eye and I'm Alan Partridge; and the films The Parole Officer, 24 Hour Party People, and Guest House Paradiso. He played various roles during the tour of Steve Coogan's 1998 live stage show The Man Who Thinks He's It.

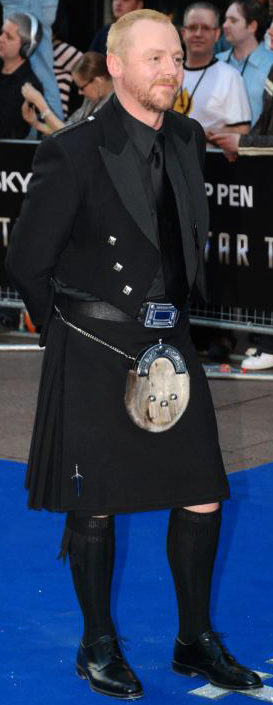
Pegg at a premiere for Star Trek in April 2009

In 1999, he created and co-wrote the Channel 4 sitcom Spaced with Jessica Stevenson. The series was directed by Edgar Wright, with whom Pegg and Stevenson had previously worked on Asylum, and Pegg wrote the character of Mike Watt specifically for his friend Nick Frost. For his performance in this series, Pegg was nominated for a British Comedy Award as Best Male Comedy Newcomer. The experience of making a Spaced fantasy sequence featuring zombies led to Pegg and Wright co-writing the "romantic zombie comedy" film Shaun of the Dead, released in April 2004, in which Pegg also starred. At George A. Romero's invitation, Pegg and Wright made cameo appearances in Romero's zombie film, Land of the Dead. In 2004, Pegg guest-starred in a spin-off of the television show Danger! 50,000 Volts! called Danger! 50,000 Zombies!, in which he played a zombie-hunter named Dr. Fell.

He played mutant bounty hunter Johnny Alpha, the Strontium Dog, in a series of Big Finish Productions audio plays based on the character from British comic 2000 AD. Pegg also appeared in Big Finish Productions' Doctor Who audio story Invaders From Mars as Don Chaney, and appeared in the Doctor Who television series, playing the Editor in the 2005 episode "The Long Game". He also narrated the first series of the "making-of" documentary series Doctor Who Confidential.

Upon completion of Shaun of the Dead, Pegg was questioned as to whether he would be abandoning the British film industry for Hollywood, and he replied, "It's not like we're going to go away and do, I don't know, Mission: Impossible III", picking the title of an imaginary blockbuster. When the film Mission: Impossible III was subsequently made, Pegg appeared in it as Benji Dunn, an IMF technician who assists Tom Cruise's character Ethan Hunt. He has reprised the role in five further Mission: Impossible sequel films: Ghost Protocol (2011), Rogue Nation (2015), Fallout (2018), Dead Reckoning Part One (2023), and The Final Reckoning (2025).

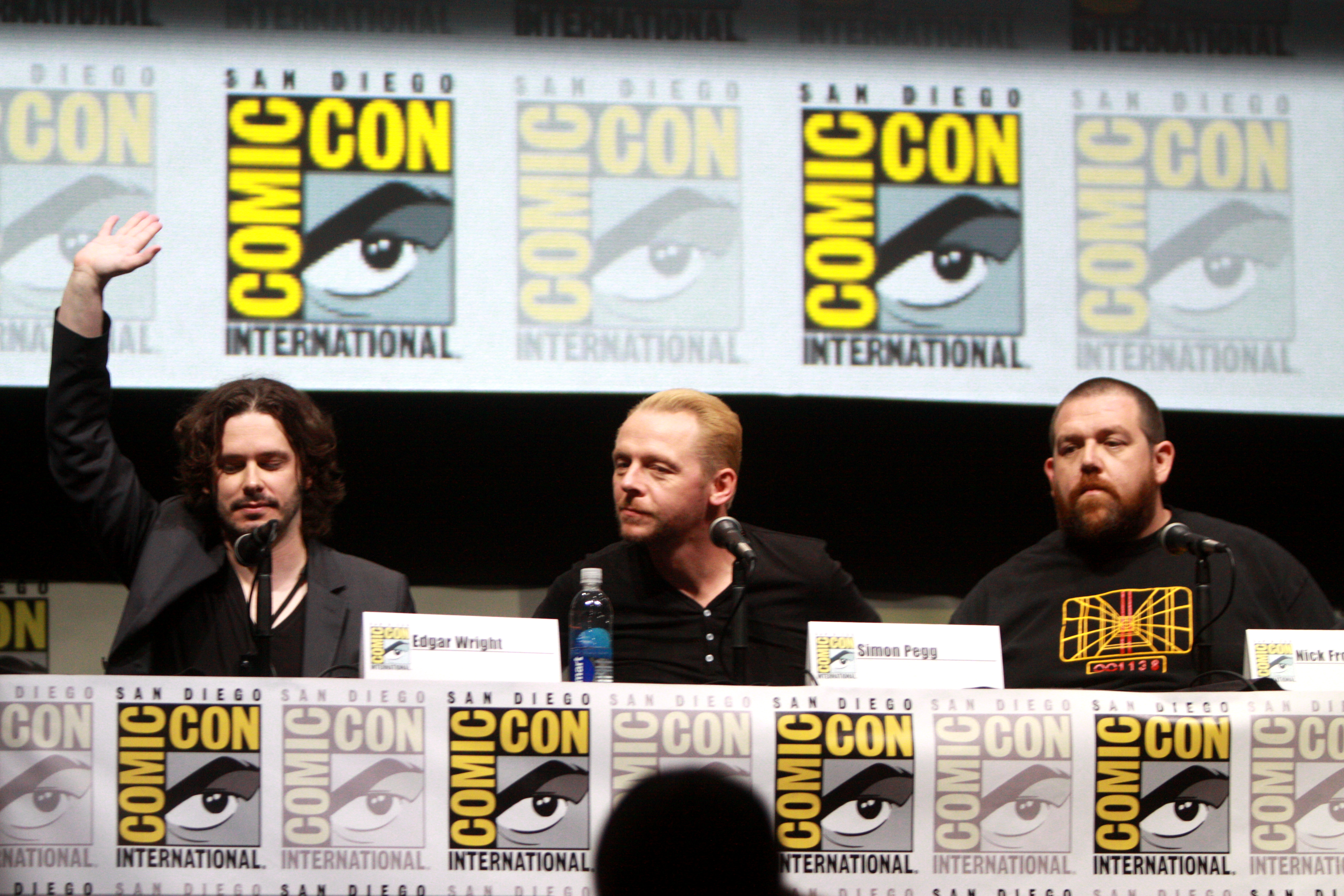
Edgar Wright, Pegg and Nick Frost (pictured in 2013) collaborated on the Three Flavours Cornetto trilogy of British comedy films between 2004 and 2013

In 2006, he played Gus in Big Nothing alongside David Schwimmer. The same year, Pegg and Wright completed their second film, Hot Fuzz, released in February 2007. The film is a police-action movie homage and also stars Nick Frost, in which Pegg plays Nicholas Angel, a London policeman transferred to rural Sandford, a fictional village where grisly events take place. In 2007, Pegg starred in The Good Night (directed by Jake Paltrow) and Run Fatboy Run directed by David Schwimmer and co-starring Thandie Newton and Hank Azaria. In 2008, he wrote the dialogue for an English language re-release of the cult 2006 animated Norwegian film, Free Jimmy. Pegg received screenwriting credit for this, and also voiced one of the main characters in the English-language version, which has an international range of actors including Woody Harrelson.

Pegg co-wrote the script for a film called Paul, about two young men who encounter a comedic extraterrestrial alien during a road trip across the US. The completed script appeared on the 2008 "Brit List", a film-industry-compiled survey of the best unproduced British screenplays, inspired by the American Black List. In those films and in Spaced, Pegg typically plays the leading hero while Frost plays the sidekick. However Paul reverses this dynamic. The film was released in 2011.

"I've now done the ultimate nerd hat trick – Doctor Who, Star Wars and Star Trek."

— Pegg speaking on the BBC's The Graham Norton Show, January 2018.

Pegg played engineer Montgomery "Scotty" Scott in Star Trek, the eleventh film in the Star Trek film series, released 8 May 2009. He reprised the role in Star Trek Into Darkness (2013) and Star Trek Beyond (2016), also co-writing the latter. In 2010 he appeared as William Burke in Burke & Hare, a film directed by John Landis about two Ulstermen who were notorious murderers and bodysnatchers in early 19th-century Edinburgh. His likeness was also used for the character of Wee Hughie in the comic book series The Boys. Though this was done without Pegg's permission, he quickly became a fan of the title, and even wrote the introduction to the first bound volume; he eventually appeared in the series' live-action television adaptation in the recurring role of Hughie's father Hugh Campbell Sr, as well as voicing an alternate, comic-accurate version of Hughie in the spin-off animated series The Boys Presents: Diabolical. He voiced Reepicheep, the heroic mouse in Chronicles of Narnia: Voyage of the Dawn Treader.

Pegg and Wright completed the Three Flavours Cornetto trilogy (the first two films being Shaun of the Dead and Hot Fuzz) with their 2013 film The World's End. In July 2014, Pegg appeared on stage with Monty Python during their live show Monty Python Live (Mostly) held at the O_{2} Arena, London. He was the special guest in their "Blackmail" sketch. In 2015 he appeared in Star Wars: The Force Awakens as Unkar Plutt, the Junkyard dealer on Jakku.

Pegg voiced Professor Phineas Nigellus Black in the 2023 video game Hogwarts Legacy.

In May 2023, Pegg was interviewed by Lauren Laverne on the long running BBC radio programme Desert Island Discs.

== Political views and activism ==
In 2014, Pegg announced his support for the feminist campaign HeForShe.

In 2016, Pegg spoke of having respect for Jeremy Corbyn and believing in Britain Stronger in Europe's ideas in relation to the EU.

In 2020, Pegg signed an open letter calling for the wealthiest in society to pay more tax in order to help fight inequality.

Pegg has been an activist for Greenpeace since 2021, protesting overfishing and supporting their "Don't stop thinking about tomorrow" campaign.

== Personal life ==
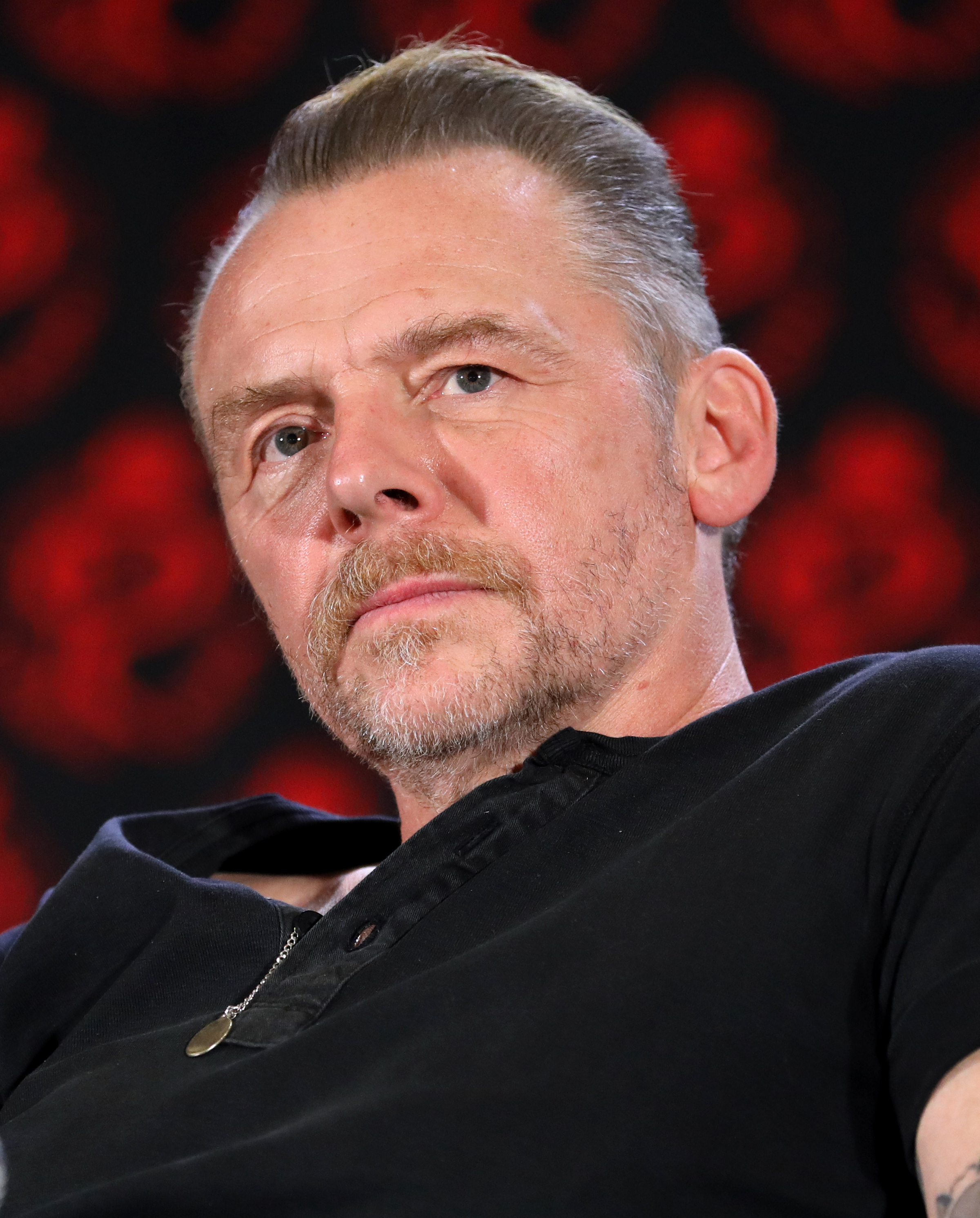
Pegg in 2024

Pegg is an atheist and has sectoral heterochromia. He married his long-time girlfriend, music industry publicist Maureen McCann, in Glasgow on 23 July 2005. They reside in Essendon, Hertfordshire. The couple have one child together, born in 2009. Nick Frost was the best man at his wedding.

Pegg is close friends with Coldplay lead singer Chris Martin, and appears as a violin-playing Elvis impersonator in the video for Coldplay's 2010 single "Christmas Lights". Along with Jonny Buckland, Pegg is godfather to Martin and Gwyneth Paltrow's daughter Apple. In return, Martin is godfather to Pegg's daughter. In a video interview with British GQ magazine in July 2018, Pegg stated that his daughter has sung backing vocals for Coldplay onstage at the Glastonbury Festival. Pegg is also godfather to the son of actor and friend Martin Freeman. Pegg's parents and sister briefly appeared in Spaced, while his mother appeared in both Shaun of the Dead and Hot Fuzz.

In a July 2018 interview with The Guardian, Pegg spoke about his battle with depression and alcoholism, and how rehab helped him recover from the latter. He stated: "When I watch Mission: Impossible III, I can see where I was then, which was fairly lost, and unhappy, and an alcoholic [...] I'm not ashamed of what happened. And I think if anyone finds any relationship to it, then it might motivate them to get well. But I am not proud of it, either – I don't think it's cool, like I was Mr. Rock 'n' Roll, blackout and all that shit. It wasn't, it was just terrible." Pegg checked into a rehab facility shortly before production of Mission: Impossible – Ghost Protocol. He hid his recovery from the tabloids through court orders, although some journalists went so far as to call the clinic pretending to be his mother. Pegg attended Alcoholics Anonymous meetings and has remained sober since. In October 2026, Pegg revealed he had been diagnosed with ADHD.

== Awards and nominations ==
| Year | Nominated work | Award | Result | Ref. |
|---|---|---|---|---|
| 1999 | Big Train | British Comedy Award for Best Male Comedy Award | Nominated | |
| 2000 | Spaced | BAFTA TV Situation Comedy Award (shared with Edgar Wright, Nira Park and Jessica Hynes) | Nominated | |
| 2000 | Spaced | British Comedy Award for Best Male Comedy Newcomer | Nominated | |
| 2004 | Shaun of the Dead | Bram Stoker Award for Best Screenplay (shared with Edgar Wright) | Won | |
| 2004 | Shaun of the Dead | British Independent Film Award for Best Screenplay (shared with Edgar Wright) | Won | |
| 2004 | Shaun of the Dead | Peter Sellers Award for Comedy | Won | |
| 2004 | Shaun of the Dead | Empire Award for Best British Actor | Nominated | |
| 2004 | Shaun of the Dead | London Film Critics' Circle Award for British Screenwriter of the Year (shared with Edgar Wright) | Nominated | |
| 2004 | Shaun of the Dead | Online Film Critics Society Award for Best Original Screenplay (shared with Edgar Wright) | Nominated | |
| 2007 | Hot Fuzz | Empire Award for Best Actor | Nominated | |
| 2009 | Star Trek | Boston Society of Film Critics Award for Best Cast | Won | |
| 2009 | Star Trek | Broadcast Film Critics Association Award for Best Cast | Nominated | |
| 2009 | Star Trek | Critics' Choice Award for Best Acting Ensemble | Nominated | |
| 2009 | Star Trek | Scream Award for Best Ensemble | Nominated | |
| 2009 | Ice Age: Dawn of the Dinosaurs | Visual Effects Society Award for Outstanding Animated Character in an Animated Feature (shared with Peter de Sève) | Nominated | |
| 2013 | The World's End | Broadcast Film Critics Association Award for Best Actor in a Comedy | Nominated | |
| 2013 | The World's End | MTV Movie Award for Best Fight (shared with Nick Frost, Paddy Considine, Martin Freeman, & Eddie Marsan) | Nominated | |
| 2013 | The World's End | Saturn Award for Best Writing | Nominated | |
| 2013 | The World's End | Saturn Award for Best Actor | Nominated | |
| 2015 | Mission: Impossible – Rogue Nation | Saturn Award for Best Supporting Actor | Nominated | |
| 2020 | Lost Transmissions | Prague Independent Film Festival | Won | |

== Honours ==
Pegg was awarded an honorary fellowship by the University of Gloucestershire on 4 December 2008.

| Preceded by none | Narrator of Doctor Who Confidential; 2005 | Succeeded by Mark Gatiss |
