= Zanzibar (Inside No. 9) =

- Inside No. 9 episode
- Poster designed by Christopher Clegg
- Episode no.: Series 4 Episode 1
- Directed by: David Kerr
- Written by: Steve Pemberton; Reece Shearsmith
- Original air date: 2 January 2018
- Running time: 30 minutes

Guest appearances
- Jaygann Ayeh as Fred; Rory Kinnear as Prince Rico/Gus; Bill Paterson as Mr Green; Marcia Warren as Alice; Hattie Morahan as Amber; Helen Monks as Colette; Tanya Franks as Tracey; Kevin Eldon as Vince

Episode chronology
← Previous "Private View"	Next → "Bernie Clifton's Dressing Room"

"Zanzibar" is the first episode of the fourth series of the British black comedy anthology television programme Inside No. 9. Written by Steve Pemberton and Reece Shearsmith, it was directed by David Kerr and was first shown on 2 January 2018, on BBC Two. It stars Pemberton, Shearsmith, Rory Kinnear, Bill Paterson, Marcia Warren, Hattie Morahan, Kevin Eldon, Tanya Franks, Helen Monks and Jaygann Ayeh. It is written entirely in iambic pentameter.

It received positive reviews from critics.

== Plot ==
Prince Rico, the heir to a kingdom, and his bodyguard, Henry, who secretly wishes to assassinate Rico, enter the 9th floor of Hotel Zanzibar. Rico enters room 911, and after Henry enters room 912, Rico hires a prostitute from a bellboy, Fred.

Alice, who suffers from memory problems, leaves room 918, and knocks on room 915, and Mr Green answers the door. Her son, Robert, comes out and brings her back to room 918; Alice is unable to remember their room number or that Robert is her son.

Amber and her boyfriend Gus, who looks identical to Rico, enter the 9th floor. They have had a relationship for ten years, and it is struggling. Gus attempts to enter room 914; the keycard is broken and he goes back down to reception to replace it. A maid, Colette, helps Amber change her room from 914 to 913, who plans to sleep in separate rooms from Gus. Rico changes his room to room 914.

Mr Green, planning suicide, opens his door and asks Colette for a bath plug, planning to cut his wrists. He had twin sons, both given up at birth, as he was in prison, while the mother had died. One son was sent abroad, and the other stayed in England; Mr Green does not know what happened to them after.

Gus comes back with a new keycard. He attempts to enter room 914, and discovers that it also does not work. Fred mistakes Gus for Rico, and sends him to room 911. Gus reveals that he has ordered an apple tart with a diamond ring in it, and intends to propose to Amber with it. Alice leaves room 918 and knocks on room 914. Rico answers and believes she is the prostitute. While Rico still has his room's door open, Amber comes out of room 913. She mistakes Rico for Gus, and slaps him in disgust.

Henry comes out of room 912 to assassinate Rico, thinking that Rico is still in room 911. He hesitates for long enough for the prostitute, Tracey, to enter the scene. Henry pays her to pour a sedative into a glass of wine and make Rico drink it; he plans to assassinate Rico while he is sleeping under the sedative. Henry knocks on room 911, and brings Tracey into the room. Robert, seeing that Alice has left the room, begins to search the hotel.

Colette and Vince, a hypnotist, enter the 9th floor. She brings him to room 916. However, she convinces him to make Amber fall in love with the next person she meets, and they enter room 913. Rico has "finished" with Alice, and seeing that room 917's door is open, she enters. Tracey leaves Gus's room, and he is horrified at his experience. Fred comes, and insists that Gus pays Tracey; he refuses. Tracey sets down the glass of wine, and demands a meal. Fred gives her the apple tart with a diamond ring, replacing its plate with one of leftovers. Fred and Tracey enter room 917.

Vince has finished the hypnosis. He picks up the glass of wine and enters room 916. Colette knocks on room 914, and she attempts to bring Rico (thinking that he is Gus) to Amber. Instead, Rico asks Colette to clean his room. Fred leads Alice back to room 918. Robert, having searched the hotel, returns to the 9th floor. He knocks on room 913; the hypnosis works, and Amber falls deeply in love with him, taking him to the 9th floor's corridor where they makes out. Robert does not enjoy this.

Colette and Rico leave room 914. Witnessing Amber and Robert, Colette tries to convince Rico to get back his "girlfriend", Amber. Tracey leaves room 917 and demands payment from Rico, mistaking him for Gus. Fred brings Alice out from room 918, and Tracey attempts to take Rico's payment to Alice. Fred and Colette try to sort the situation out, and they enter room 916. Rico enters room 912.

Gus comes out of room 911. Amber, believing Rico is Gus, is angry with him for having sex with Alice. Attempting to defuse the situation, Gus presents Alice the leftovers, believing it to be the tart. Fred and Colette carry a sleeping Vince out of room 916. Tracey attempts to slap Amber, and slaps Alice instead, bringing back her memory. Fred brings Tracey to room 917. Gus gives Amber a "true love's kiss", and breaks the hypnosis. Rico comes out of room 914, and everyone is stunned by the similarity between Gus and Rico. Alice screams and Mr Green comes out of room 915 in anger. He realises that Gus and Rico are his twin sons, and reconsiders suicide.

Henry leaves room 912 and holds a knife to Mr Green, threatening to kill him if Gus and Rico do not reveal themselves. Vince wakes up and uses a hypnosis trick on Henry, and he drops the knife, singing and dancing. Henry is grabbed and locked in room 912 until the police can be called. A toilet flushes, Tracey exits room 917, brings out the diamond ring, and Gus puts it on Amber's finger.
