= Tom & Gerri =

- Inside No. 9 episode
- Episode no.: Series 1 Episode 3
- Directed by: David Kerr
- Written by: Steve Pemberton; Reece Shearsmith
- Original air date: 19 February 2014
- Running time: 30 minutes

Guest appearances
- Gemma Arterton as Gerri; Conleth Hill as Stevie

Episode chronology
← Previous "A Quiet Night In"	Next → "Last Gasp"

"Tom & Gerri" is the third episode of the first series of the British dark comedy anthology series Inside No. 9. It premiered on BBC Two on 19 February 2014. The episode was based on a play that Steve Pemberton and Reece Shearsmith had written while living together prior to the development of their series The League of Gentlemen. While the play had originally been around two hours in length, the episode was only half an hour. "Tom & Gerri" follows a difficult period in the life of Tom (Shearsmith), a primary school teacher and aspiring writer, and his girlfriend Gerri (Gemma Arterton), a struggling actress, after Tom invites the homeless Migg (Pemberton) into his home. Conleth Hill stars as Stevie, a man worried about the mental health of his friend Tom. The entire episode takes place inside Tom's flat.

Reviewers generally agreed that "Tom & Gerri" was significantly darker but less funny than previous episodes of Inside No. 9. Nonetheless, the response to the episode as a whole was very positive. Critics disagreed about the presentation of Tom's mental illness in the episode, with one journalist suggesting that the episode's ending "set back public awareness of mental health at least half an hour", but another saying that the story presented "a fine – if cartoonish – take on mental illness".

== Production ==
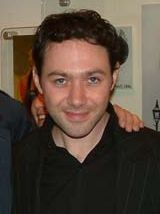
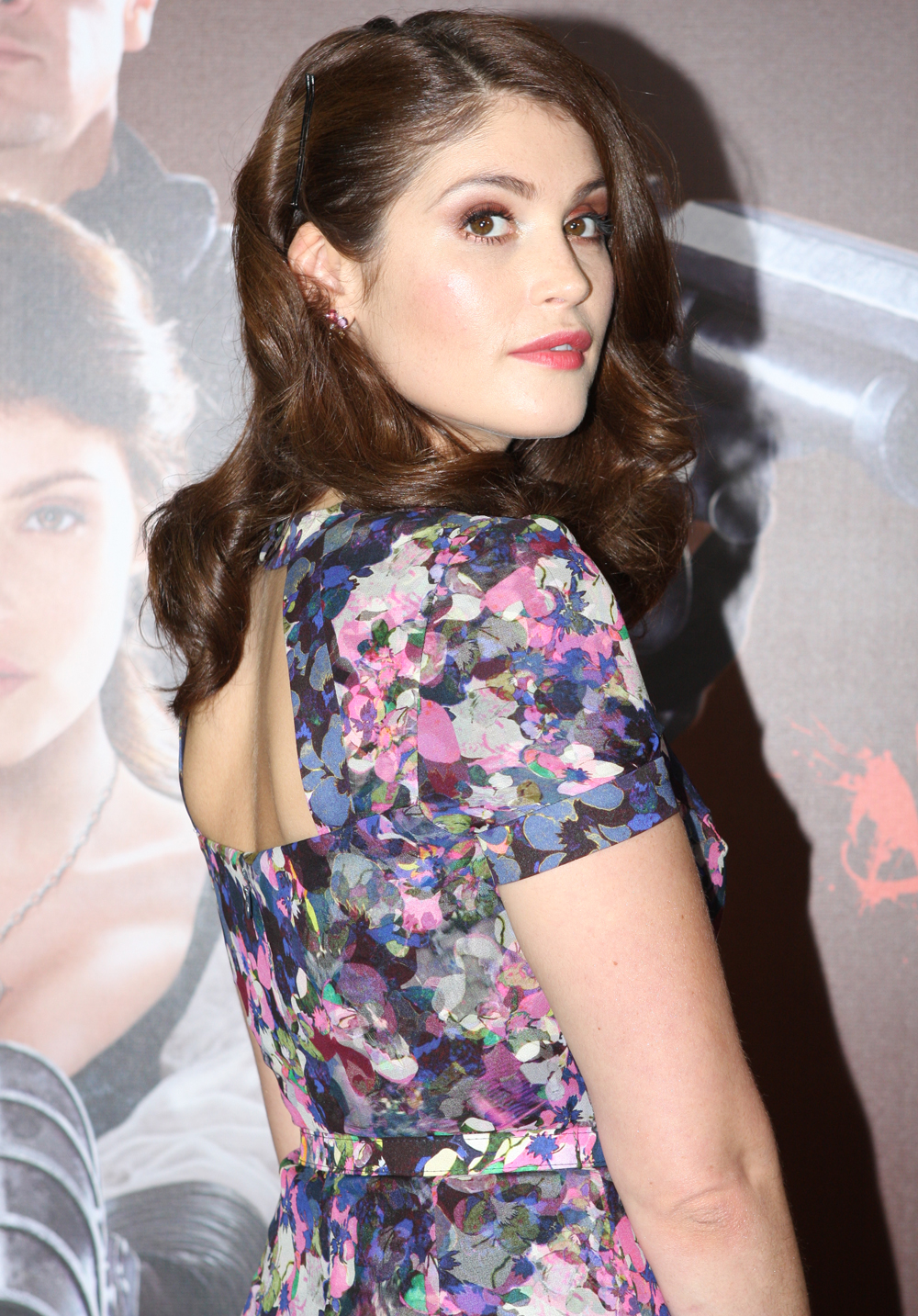
Reece Shearsmith (left, pictured in 2003) co-wrote "Tom & Gerri" and starred as Tom, while Gemma Arterton (right, pictured in 2013) starred as Gerri.

Writers Steve Pemberton and Reece Shearsmith, who had previously worked together on The League of Gentlemen and Psychoville, took inspiration for Inside No. 9 from "David and Maureen", episode 4 of the first series of Psychoville. This episode, in turn, was inspired by Alfred Hitchcock's Rope. "David and Maureen" took place entirely in a single room, and was filmed in only two shots. At the same time, the concept of Inside No. 9 was a "reaction" to Psychoville, with Shearsmith saying that "We'd been so involved with labyrinthine over-arcing, we thought it would be nice to do six different stories with a complete new house of people each week. That's appealing, because as a viewer you might not like this story, but you've got a different one next week." As an anthology series with horror themes, Inside No. 9 also pays homage to Tales of the Unexpected, The Twilight Zone and Alfred Hitchcock Presents.

The "loose story" of "Tom and Gerri" was written originally as a two-hour play while Shearsmith and Pemberton were on the dole and sharing a flat, prior to the production of League of Gentlemen. The story was inspired by their experiences in this environment. The character of Tom has his "life energy" drained in the same way that, the writers suggest, is experienced by jobhunters. The "sinister" atmosphere of the episode is meant to evoke the feeling that a person has when they "can't quite manage to leave the flat" and they "can't be bothered to tidy up". "Tom & Gerri" ended up "quite different" from the play, which featured a character much like Pauline from The League of Gentlemen. Pemberton described the feel of the episode as Pinteresque, comparing it to Harold Pinter's A Slight Ache. This sentiment was echoed by critic Gareth Lightfoot, writing in Teesside's Evening Gazette.

As the format of Inside No. 9 requires new characters each week, the writers were able to attract actors who may have been unwilling to commit to an entire series. In addition to the writers, "Tom & Gerri" starred Gemma Arterton and Conleth Hill. The flat in which the episode was filmed, with its boardgames and "misery", was, for Shearsmith, similar to the flat once shared by the writers. The episode was filmed in winter, and Pemberton described a "grim" atmosphere during filming. He also said that he hated the wig and beard he wore to play Migg, which irritated his skin. David Chater, writing in The Times, said that the hair meant Migg "has an eerie resemblance to the Cowardly Lion from the Wizard of Oz - only not nearly as benign".

Considering the title of "Tom & Gerri", critic Bruce Dessau suggested that it was likely not a reference to the Tom and Jerry of 1970s sitcom The Good Life, as the life of Tom and Gerri is "anything but good". Instead, he suggested, the reference was more likely to cartoon characters Tom and Jerry, saying that there "is definitely a hint of cat and mouse" in the plot. Metro critics Larushka Ivan-Zadeh and Carol Carter concurred, saying that the plot consisted of "a game of cat and mouse".

== Plot ==
External videos
- "D-Day Doris"; Tom and Gerri talk about Gerri's acting
- "Migg's reward" Migg returns Tom's wallet

The episode begins with Tom (Shearsmith), a primary school teacher, apathetically marking work while chatting to his girlfriend Gerri (Arterton), who is going to audition for a part in a play. Tom complains about a tramp begging outside their house. Later in the evening, Tom is home alone and the tramp, Migg (Pemberton), knocks at his door to return Tom's wallet. He introduces himself, and Tom rewards him with £40 from his wallet. Migg comes back later with a bottle of whiskey for Tom. Reluctantly, Tom invites Migg inside for a drink. Migg says he knew Charles Bukowski, whose literary work Tom idolises, and Tom warms to Migg as they drink.

Tom awakes the next morning on his sofa. Gerri is alarmed to see him there, as he should be at work, and then gets angry that Migg was invited in. Migg emerges from the bathroom as Gerri leaves the house, and encourages Tom to phone in sick. It is revealed that Tom had promised Migg some of his clothes, and Migg makes breakfast. Later, Migg and Tom play Risk and drink wine. Tom is concerned that Gerri has not called. When Tom heads out to buy cigarettes and wine, Migg hides Tom's mobile phone and deletes an answerphone message left by Tom's colleague Stevie (Hill).

A week later, Tom lies in bed, smoking and writing. Gerri enters the room, and it is revealed that Tom has quit his job as a teacher. She has been rehearsing in Portsmouth and says she left him dozens of messages, but Tom thinks he's lost his phone. The pair fight over Migg, who is still living with Tom. Later still, the flat is a mess, and Tom is unkempt and drinking heavily. He has no messages on his phone and no post. He sits down to play Scrabble with Migg, and it is revealed that it is Tom's birthday. The two argue about washing up, and Migg says that Tom has "no right" to judge him. Tom storms out of the room, and Migg flicks through birthday cards he has hidden from Tom, saying "Thank you, Grandma!" and taking the £10 that Tom's grandmother sent him. The house and Tom have deteriorated further when Stevie comes to visit. He has brought Tom vouchers for The Body Shop. Stevie invites Tom out for dinner, but he declines. Stevie leaves, and Tom settles down with Migg on the sofa.

Tom's electricity supply is cut off due to the bills not being paid, and he weeps. A shaven Migg, wearing clean clothes, enters the house. He has started a job, working with children, and gives Tom £40 because Tom has "done so much" for Migg. Migg wants to take over the tenancy on the flat until Tom's benefits come in. He walks into the bathroom to get into the bath as Gerri walks in and comforts Tom, who asks her not to leave. Gerri tells Tom that he has invented Migg to cope with what has been happening. She says Tom is depressed and has had a nervous breakdown. The pair head into the bathroom, but there is no Migg. Gerri tells Tom to "get this Migg out of [his] head once and for all". She leaves, and Migg emerges from a hiding place; he asks if everything is alright.

Things apparently get better: the flat is tidy, the electricity is working, Tom is smartly dressed and clean-shaven. Gerri is happily chatting to him. Tom answers the door to Stevie, who comments happily on Tom’s improvement and asks Tom to come back to work. Tom, open to the idea, warmly invites Stevie in for a cup of tea. Stevie is alarmed to see Tom call Gerri; Stevie says that Gerri was killed in a car accident, and that Tom went back to work too soon. Stevie heads to the bathroom to get Tom's medication, but freezes when he sees the corpse of Migg in the bath. Tom tells him not to worry, and that Migg is not real. He invites a terrified Stevie to stay for coffee, saying Gerri is just boiling the kettle.

== Reception ==
You're not Charles Bukowski, you're just a primary school teacher who had a nervous breakdown.

— Gerri, upon finding Tom in the dark flat. Will Dean, writing in The Independent, called the line "glorious".

Reviewers generally agreed that the episode was darker than previous episodes, but not as funny. However, Will Dean, writing in The Independent, said that his observation that the episode "wasn't really in the slightest bit funny" was "no complaint". The critical response to "Tom & Gerri" was overwhelmingly positive; Dean was "moved by its sad brilliance", while Gerald Gilbert, also writing in The Independent, called it "another finely worked playlet". Bruce Dessau said viewers would be "totally immersed from start to finish".

Critics disagreed on how "Tom & Gerri" compared to previous episodes of Inside No. 9. Writing in The Guardian, Mark Jones said that "Tom & Gerri" was the "highlight of the series so far, with Shearsmith and Steve Pemberton on top form". Pat Stacey, of the Evening Herald, agreed, though considered the previous episodes weak. By contrast, an anonymous reviewer in the Liverpool Echo thought "Sardines" was stronger, but said "Tom & Gerri" was "definitely the creepiest" of the first three, and Chater also disagreed with Jones and Stacey; while he praised the episode as "a sinister tale about the fragile nature of sanity performed by actors who are frighteningly good", he felt that it was not as strong as earlier installments. Like Chater, Dessau stressed the quality of the acting, praising the performances of both Shearsmith and Pemberton, especially the latter.

There was further disagreement on the episode's approach to mental illness. Andrew Billen, writing in The Times, said he initially thought Mind may be able to use "Tom & Gerri" as a teaching aid, but he said that the ending "set back public awareness of mental health at least half an hour". By contrast, Dean considered the character of Tom to be "a fine – if cartoonish – take on mental illness". Several themes present in "Tom & Gerri", including mental illness, were revisited in Inside No. 9's third series with "Diddle Diddle Dumpling".

Billen called the episode "distressing comedy to watch", but said that "the acting, the scripting, the satisfactions of one-act resolution and the laughter it generated" were redeeming qualities, and gave the episode four out of a possible five stars. Dessau felt that parts of the script were predictable, but some twists "catch you completely unaware", while the ending "may haunt [viewers] for days". Jack Seale, of the Radio Times, suggested that viewers will believe that they have guessed the plot by the half-way point in the episode. However, he said that the writers "give their story of how we're all one slip away from the gutter a chilling sense of rising dread" which counteracts this. "Nobody", he said, "plays wicked games with the audience more skilfully." Larushka Ivan-Zadeh and Carol Carter, writing in Metro, suggested that viewers would want to rewatch the episode in an attempt to pick up clues to the plot twists that they originally missed.
