= A Quiet Night In =

- Inside No. 9 episode
- "A Quiet Night In" poster, designed by Matt Owen
- Episode no.: Series 1 Episode 2
- Directed by: David Kerr
- Written by: Steve Pemberton; Reece Shearsmith
- Original air date: 12 February 2014
- Running time: 30 minutes

Guest appearances
- Denis Lawson as Gerald; Joyce Veheary as Kim; Oona Chaplin as Sabrina; Kayvan Novak as Paul

Episode chronology
← Previous "Sardines"	Next → "Tom & Gerri"

"A Quiet Night In" is the second episode of the first series of the British dark comedy television anthology series Inside No. 9. It first aired on 12 February 2014 on BBC Two. Written by Reece Shearsmith and Steve Pemberton, it stars the writers as a pair of hapless burglars attempting to break into the large, modernist house of a couple—played by Denis Lawson and Oona Chaplin—to steal a painting. Once the burglars make it into the house, they encounter obstacle after obstacle, while the lovers, unaware of the burglars' presence, argue. The episode progresses almost entirely without dialogue, relying instead on physical comedy and slapstick, though more sinister elements are present in the plot. In addition to Pemberton, Shearsmith, Lawson and Chaplin, "A Quiet Night In" also starred Joyce Veheary and Kayvan Novak.

Shearsmith and Pemberton had originally considered including a dialogue-free segment in their television series Psychoville, but ultimately did not; they found the format of Inside No. 9 appropriate for revisiting the idea. Both journalists and those involved with the episode's production commented on the casting of Chaplin, a grandchild of the silent film star Charlie Chaplin, in an almost entirely dialogue-free episode, though her casting was not a deliberate homage. Critics generally responded positively to the episode, and a particularly laudatory review by David Chater was published in The Times, prompting a complaint from a reader who found the episode more traumatic than comedic. On its first airing, "A Quiet Night In" was watched by 940,000 viewers (4.8% of the market).

"A Quiet Night In" was submitted to the British Academy of Film and Television Arts for the 2015 awards, but it was not nominated. Pemberton and Shearsmith said that they had no plans to do further silent episodes, but have compared "A Quiet Night In" to the highly-experimental "Cold Comfort" from Inside No. 9's second series, a sentiment echoed by some television critics.

== Production ==
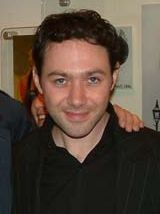
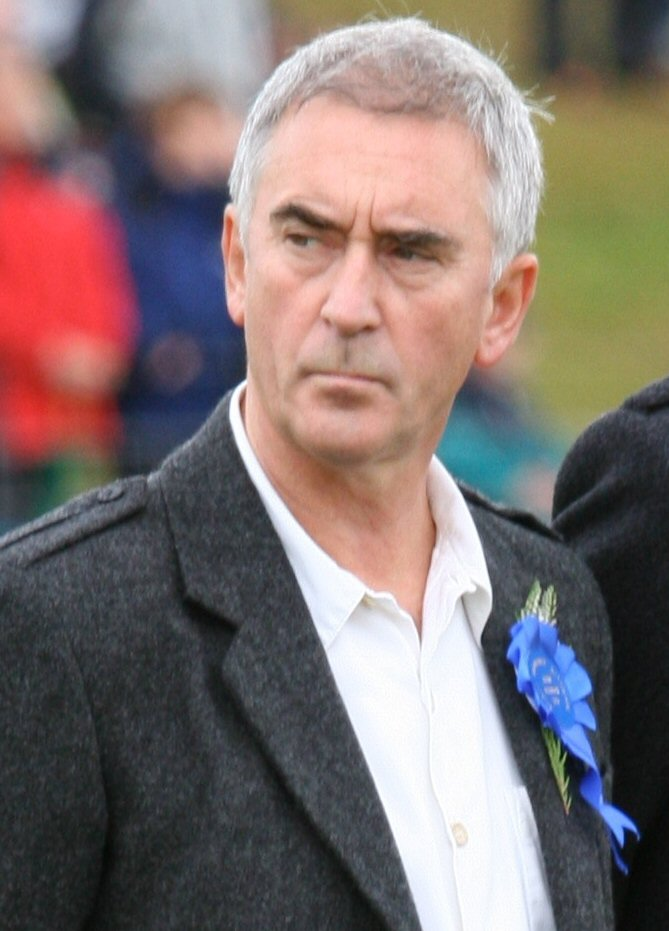
Reece Shearsmith (left, pictured in 2003) co-wrote "A Quiet Night In" and starred as a moustachioed burglar, while Denis Lawson (right, pictured in 2006) starred as a wealthy homeowner.

Writers Steve Pemberton and Reece Shearsmith, who had previously co-written and starred in The League of Gentlemen and Psychoville, took inspiration for Inside No. 9 from "David and Maureen", episode 4 of the first series of Psychoville, which was in turn inspired by Alfred Hitchcock's Rope. "David and Maureen" took place entirely in a single room, and was filmed in only two shots. At the same time, the concept of Inside No. 9 was a "reaction" to Psychoville, with Shearsmith saying that "we'd been so involved with labyrinthine over-arcing, we thought it would be nice to do six different stories with a complete new house of people each week. That's appealing, because as a viewer you might not like this story, but you've got a different one next week." As an anthology series with horror themes, Inside No. 9 also pays homage to Tales of the Unexpected, The Twilight Zone and Alfred Hitchcock Presents.

The format of Inside No. 9 allowed Pemberton and Shearsmith to explore ideas which are less practical for other approaches to storytelling, such as the possibility of a script with little dialogue. Prior to writing "A Quiet Night In", Shearsmith had spoken with directors, including Ben Wheatley, about the possibility of producing television without speech. The directors had expressed doubts, Shearsmith explained, because the success of dialogue-free television comes down entirely to the visuals and filming. "A Quiet Night In" was inspired by an idea Shearsmith and Pemberton had discussed for Psychoville. The writers had considered omitting dialogue from a ten-minute section in an episode, or even from the whole episode. Pemberton explained that this was not possible as there were "too many good jokes" which they wanted to fit into the sequence. This episode, like "A Quiet Night In", dealt with a break-in.

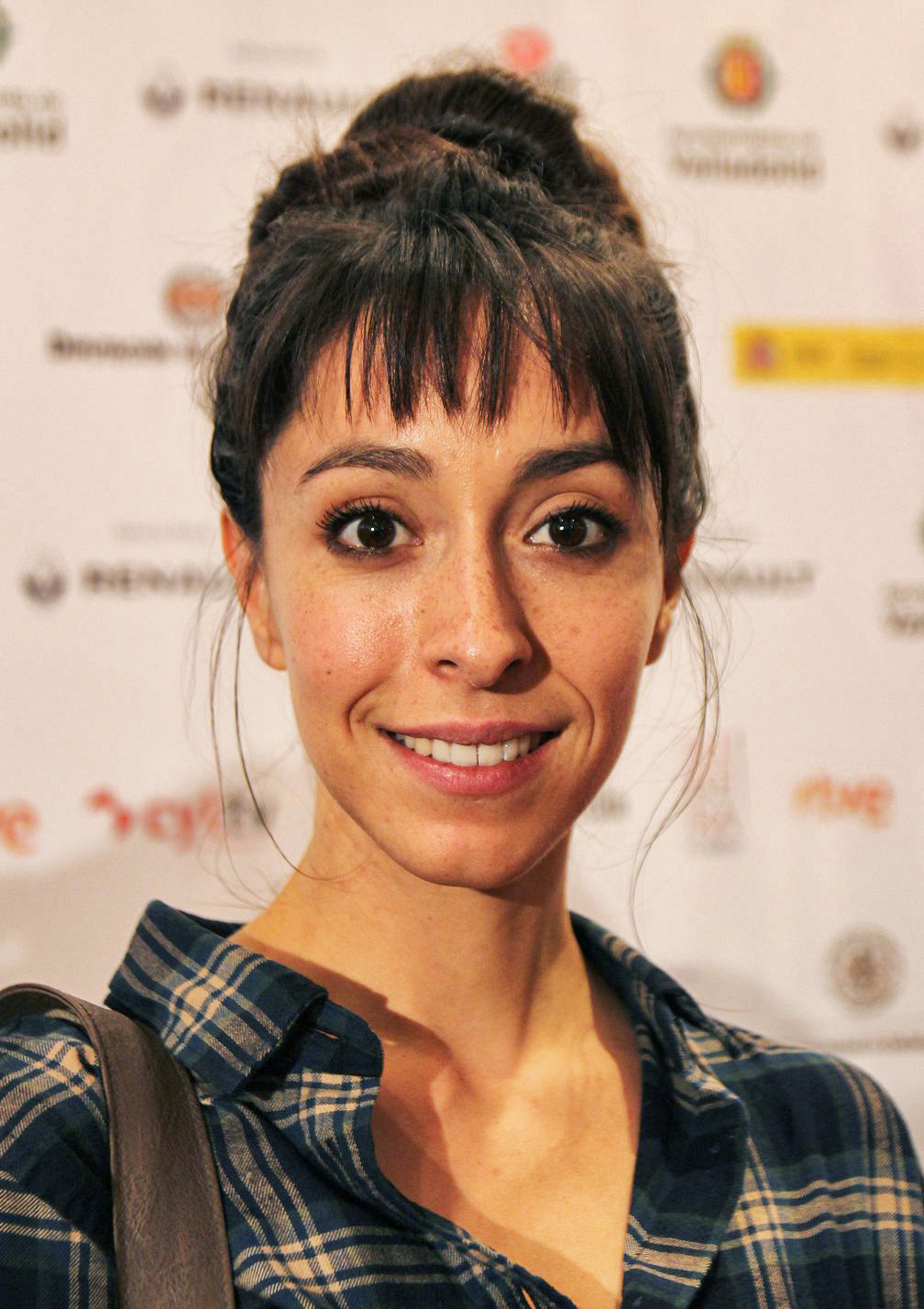
The mostly dialogue-free episode starred Oona Chaplin (pictured, 2016), a grandchild of the silent film star Charlie Chaplin.

Inside No. 9, for Pemberton, offered the "perfect vehicle" for revisiting the possibility of dialogue-free television. Shearsmith said that, at the start of the writing process, the pair did not have the intention of scripting the entire episode without dialogue, and that it would be "great" to have ten minutes without it. However, Pemberton said it was easier to write once they had entered the correct "mindset". Once half an episode had been written, Pemberton said, the pair thought "we've just got to keep going". The only dialogue in the episode is right at the end; "what a great thing to get to the end and just have one line of dialogue", Pemberton suggested, comparing the concept to that of the Mel Brooks film Silent Movie.

The story of "A Quiet Night In" revolves around a break-in, which, combined with an argument between the people living in the house, means that the characters all have a reason to be silent. At 18 pages of stage directions, the script contained every joke in the episode, an exercise in planning atypical for Shearsmith and Pemberton. The story contains multiple "reveals"; Pemberton explained that he and Shearsmith "hope there's an 'oh my God' moment. There is always a desire to wrong-foot the viewer. That's what you strive to do". Pemberton said that writing for a silent episode "makes you inventive in a completely different way".

The episode was filmed at the White Lodge, in Oxted, Surrey. The episode's burglars are played by the writers; the pair were quoted as saying "we didn't want to dominate [the series], so we sometimes play fairly minor characters. But we know that, say, if we were writing something about two burglars, we'd be the burglars." Pemberton suggested that a partial influence for the episode may have been the children's television series Brum. He said that he and Shearsmith had "always wanted to be a couple of robbers in that, so that might be where the idea came from". Both writers agreed that their roles were "great to perform", and Pemberton described the resulting episode by saying that it "worked out better than [they] could have dreamed".

As the format of Inside No. 9 requires new characters each week, the writers were able to attract actors who may have been unwilling to commit to an entire series. In addition to Pemberton and Shearsmith, "A Quiet Night In" starred Denis Lawson, Joyce Veheary, Oona Chaplin and Kayvan Novak. Pemberton commented on the appropriateness of casting Chaplin, a grandchild of the silent film star Charlie Chaplin, in an episode with little dialogue. Shearsmith stressed that the episode should not be considered a silent film in the same way as Charlie Chaplin's, elsewhere saying that the casting was "almost an accident but maybe a little nod". Bruce Dessau, writing in The Independent, described the casting choice as "a satisfying nod to silent cinema". Both Oona Chaplin and the Inside No. 9 executive producer Jon Plowman stressed, however, that there was no significance in the casting. Chaplin also said that her character was very unlike herself, explaining that the "big boobs, the heels, the blonde wig ... freed [her] up amazingly".

== Plot ==
Opening section

Middle section

Closing section
A recording of Rachmaninoff's Piano Concerto No. 2. After Gerald turns on a music player at the start of "A Quiet Night In", an arrangement of the piece can be heard throughout most of the episode.

Inside a large, modernist house, Gerald (Lawson) turns on Rachmaninoff's Piano Concerto No. 2 and sits down to soup brought by his housekeeper, Kim (Veheary). Through the windows behind him, burglars Eddie (Pemberton) and Ray (Shearsmith) are seen. (Note: As the episode is mostly without dialogue, most of the characters' names are not revealed until the credits.) Ray enters the house, then lets in Eddie while Gerald is using the toilet. Eddie is shocked to see that the pair have come to steal an almost completely white painting. Ray starts to dismantle the painting while Eddie keeps watch; he tries to guide a Yorkshire Terrier out of the patio window, but inadvertently lets in an Irish Wolfhound. As Ray releases the wolfhound, Eddie accidentally throws the terrier into the window, so Ray stuffs the dog into an umbrella stand.

Sabrina (Chaplin) walks down the stairs, and Ray puts the painting back and hides. Sabrina turns down Gerald's music to watch EastEnders. Gerald returns, sitting away from Sabrina. He turns up his music and the pair fight over the television remote, before leaving through the patio door and arguing, though their voices are muffled. Ray cuts away the canvas and replaces it with kitchen roll. When Sabrina reenters, she unknowingly stands on the canvas. Kim picks it up, mistaking it for laundry, and heads into a laundry room as Sabrina walks upstairs. Eddie follows Kim and she sprays something into his eyes. Ray knocks out Kim and sees the canvas in a laundry basket, which is sent up a laundry chute. He runs upstairs, while Gerald remains outside.

Sabrina packs a holdall, including the contents of the laundry basket. She locks the case and heads into an en suite. Downstairs, Gerald retrieves a pistol and heads back outside. Ray attempts to steal the key from Sabrina's discarded trousers and he sees that Sabrina is a transgender woman. On the patio, Gerald points the gun into his mouth, as Eddie stumbles around in the lounge area, having accidentally pushed chilli peppers into his eyes. Ray hides under Sabrina's bed as she reenters the room; lying on a sex doll with both a penis and breasts, he is almost discovered. Eddie washes his face, and Gerald starts to play "Without You". Sabrina makes her way downstairs, taking the holdall's key. Sabrina and Gerald dance.

Ray drags the case to the top of the stairs and meets Eddie. Gerald lays Sabrina down on the sofa, places a cushion over her face and shoots her. Gerald turns off the music as the doorbell is heard. Answering the door, Gerald sees a man (Novak) who holds up a sign reading "Hello, my name is Paul. I am deaf & dumb." The reverse of the sign reads "Do you need any cleaning products today?" Gerald heads inside and hides Sabrina's body as Paul waits. Gerald splashes his soup onto the blood and invites Paul to clean it. Ray runs down the stairs and meets Paul; he proceeds to buy rope before returning upstairs. Paul continues to clean, but sees the bullethole in the cushion, and then the suitcase being lowered outside the window. Gerald heads outside to investigate, but Eddie and Ray drop the case on his head. The burglars run past Paul and look out to see the canvas in the pool, before both being shot by Paul. Paul rings someone and says "Hello, it's me. Yeah, it's done." He looks to the fake painting, and says "I've got it right here. Yeah, it's fine. Not a peep out of anyone." He takes down the painting and walks out, as the real canvas is seen sinking in the pool.

== Analysis ==
The style of "A Quiet Night In" is experimental and represents a creative risk. While Pemberton and Shearsmith's characters provide comedy, the relationship of Lawson and Chaplin's characters adds an element of darkness. The two storylines are brought together with the violence towards the end of the episode, resulting in the juxtaposition of elements reminiscent of both the Chuckle Brothers (slapstick) and Quentin Tarantino (bloody violence).

Though the comedy remains black, the comedic style of the episode differs considerably from that of "Sardines", the previous installment of Inside No. 9. "A Quiet Night In" offers a kind of "sadistic slapstick" humour; physical comedy, toilet humour and buffoonery are utilised, with the episode effectively becoming a farce. "A Quiet Night In" builds upon silent comedy tropes and norms, but, for the comedy critic Bruce Dessau, the tone is closer to that of Kill List or Sightseers than to the work of Buster Keaton. The episode features various twists, and these are generally in keeping with Pemberton and Shearsmith's typical approach, though one is reminiscent of the Farrelly brothers.

== Reception ==
External videos
- "A quiet evening meal" While Gerald eats his soup, Eddie and Ray attempt to enter the house
- "A canine inconvenience" While Kim works in the kitchen, Eddie and Ray are almost revealed by a dog

Critics generally responded positively to "A Quiet Night In". David Chater, writing for The Times, gave a highly laudatory review, saying the episode was "the funniest, cleverest, most imaginative and original television I have seen for as long as I can remember – one of those fabulous programmes where time stands still and the world around you disappears". He chose not to reveal too much about the plot for fear of "spoiling the fun". Chater later described the episode as "mindboggling in its originality", and "one of the funniest, most imaginative programmes shown on television in the past 15 years". Jane Simon, writing for the Daily Mirror, called the episode a "triumph", while writers for Metro described the episode as "quality comedy", and journalists writing for The Sunday Times characterised it as a "brilliantly conceived and choreographed mime". Jack Seale, writing for the Radio Times, also stressed how the episode was "beautifully choreographed", praising Pemberton and Shearsmith's "willingness to attempt difficult concepts".

Dessau considered the episode "genius", and described the twist ending as "genuinely unexpected". In The Observer, Mike Bradley called "A Quiet Night In" a "priceless silent farce", but, in the newspaper's sister publication The Guardian, Luke Holland was more critical. He said the episode was "an almost wordless half-hour of physical comedy", and that "it plays out like a French farce, its comedic strokes far broader" than those of "Sardines". "If you find two men silently mime-arguing about how long it takes to have a poo funny", he continued, "you're on sturdy ground here". Later, a review by Phelim O'Neill of the Inside No. 9 series 1 boxset published on theguardian.com described "A Quiet Night In" as "engaging, tense, funny, frightening – and accessibly experimental". The episode was compared positively to "Last Gasp" by Rebecca McQuillan of The Herald, who said that "A Quiet Night In" was "something close to comedy genius". An anonymous review in the South African newspaper The Saturday Star picked out "A Quiet Night In" as the strongest episode of the first series.

After the episode had aired, The Times received an email complaint about Chater's positive review of the episode, which was discussed by the journalist Rose Wild. Part of the complaint read:

I told my husband how it was supposed to be the funniest thing ever, but we were horrified! I'll never be able to forget the little dog being thrown against the window and then stabbed to death by an umbrella – nor the gay man killed by his lover, nor what they had under the bed – nor the deaf man killing the thieves. Having thieves tiptoe comically around the house before having their heads blown off did not make up for my trauma.

In response, Wild said: "I am sorry if we left any permanent damage. In our defence, we did say 'black' comedy." Wild agreed with the reader's comment that she and her husband "must be very different kinds of people" from Chater.

=== Viewing figures ===
On its first airing, the episode received 940,000 viewers (4.8% of the market). This was lower than the 1 million (5.6% of viewers) of the series's debut, "Sardines", and lower than the 1.8 million (7.4%) of Line of Duty which immediately preceded "A Quiet Night In" in most UK listings. A repeat, shown on 26 May on BBC2, attracted 900,000 viewers, which was 4% of the audience. On this occasion, the episode followed The Fast Show Special. The series average, based upon the viewing figures of the first broadcast of each episode, was 904,000 viewers, or 4.9% of the audience, lower than the slot average of 970,000 (5.1% of the audience).

== Legacy ==
"A Quiet Night In" was submitted to the British Academy of Film and Television Arts (BAFTA), but was not nominated for a 2015 BAFTA award. In an interview with Digital Spy, Shearsmith said that this surprised him, saying "I was upset, I did think it was a shame that it's not been recognised. You want people to have seen it and to have recognised the work, and innovation, but I think people are doing that. I get told that every day on Twitter, or in meetings." A number of journalists expressed surprise that Inside No. 9 had received no BAFTA nominations, with Julia Raeside, of The Guardian, describing "A Quiet Night In" as "one of the most inspired pieces of mute theatre I've seen on television".

In 2015, Shearsmith said that he and Pemberton had no intention to write any further silent episodes, as they would not want viewers to think they had run out of ideas, while Pemberton separately said that the pair had no desire to do what would be an inferior version of "A Quiet Night In". "Cold Comfort", the fourth episode of the second series of Inside No. 9, was compared to "A Quiet Night In" by Pemberton, Shearsmith and some critics. "Cold Comfort" was also filmed an experimental style, with most of the episode shot from fixed cameras and displayed on a split screen. Despite this—with its focus on listening and the fact that it was mostly static—"Cold Comfort" could, for Pemberton, be seen as the "polar opposite" of "A Quiet Night In".

In June 2016, there was a screening of "A Quiet Night In" at Arnolfini as part of Bristol's Slapstick Festival. The one-off event, entitled "A Quiet Night In with Reece & Steve", also featured Pemberton and Shearsmith discussing the episode on-stage with Robin Ince, followed by a question and answer session with the writers. In an interview with Craig Jones of the Bristol Post, Shearsmith said that he was "very excited to come to Bristol", and that he and Pemberton had been wanting to be involved with Slapstick Festival for some time. He said that "It is a lovely thing to be part of and it is great to see how respected slapstick still remains."

The episode was said to be re-ran following supposed technical issues during the air of the live episode "Dead Line". During the re-run episode, however, a ghost appears and the video feed begins to glitch. The episode returns at the end of the live episode, this time a clip of Pemberton and Shearsmith's characters dying is played on loop at increasing speed.
