= To Have and to Hold (Inside No. 9) =

- Inside No. 9 episode
- Poster designed by Poppy Hillstead
- Episode no.: Series 4 Episode 4
- Directed by: David Kerr
- Written by: Steve Pemberton; Reece Shearsmith
- Original air date: 23 January 2018
- Running time: 29 minutes

Guest appearances
- Nicola Walker as Harriet; Miranda Hennessy as Hannah; Magdalena Kurek as Agnes; Tom Mulheron as Levi

Episode chronology
← Previous "Once Removed"	Next → "And the Winner Is..."

"To Have and to Hold" is the fourth episode of series four of the British black comedy anthology television programme Inside No. 9. Written by Steve Pemberton and Reece Shearsmith, the episode was directed by David Kerr and was first shown on 23 January 2018, on BBC Two. It stars Pemberton, Shearsmith, Nicola Walker, Miranda Hennessy, Magdalena Kurek and Tom Mulheron.

== Plot ==
Adrian is a wedding photographer. His relationship with his wife, Harry, is struggling. They live together in house No. 9.

For their 20th anniversary, they are renewing their wedding vows. Harry recites a heartfelt vow, and asks Adrian to recite his as well. Adrian reads a boilerplate vow from the Internet.

At night, Harry enters the darkroom of the house, where Adrian is working. Adrian and Harry discuss their relationship. Adrian talks about how he is unable to provide for Harry; his job does not make much money, and his infertility renders him unable to have a child.

The discussion turns to arguing as Adrian brings up Harry's cheating with her former male colleague some years ago. Harry retorts that Adrian was emotionally distant at the time. As an example of this, she claims that their cleaner, Agnes, left because Adrian kept flirting with her. Adrian then reveals that he has been following Harry; he finishes developing a photo of a meeting between Harry and the male colleague.

In an attempt to rekindle their relationship, Adrian and Harry try sexual roleplay. Harry plays a nurse, and Adrian plays a patient. The session goes awkwardly, and Adrian experiences erectile dysfunction. Two of Adrian's clients, Max and Hannah, come to their house to receive their photos. While Max and Hannah browse through the photos, Adrian and Harry bicker. Max and Hannah quickly leave. After their departure, Adrian enters a hidden room in the darkroom where he has kept Agnes chained for nine years, and rapes her. It is implied that this has occurred every day since Agnes was held captive.

On Adrian's birthday, Harry gifts him a week-long trip to Paris. Adrian, panicking, rushes down to the darkroom and grabs the keys to the hidden room. Grasping the keys, he throws himself down the stairs to the darkroom.

Four months later, Max and Hannah go to the house to thank Adrian for his photos; Agnes greets them at the door. In the living room, Harry tells them that Adrian has died. Max and Hannah quickly leave. After their departure, it is revealed that due to Adrian's rape, Agnes gave birth to a boy, Levi, and Adrian had held him captive too. Levi enters the darkroom and prepares a Pot Noodle. He enters the hidden room and gives it to Adrian, who is chained to the room.
