= And the Winner Is... (Inside No. 9) =

- Inside No. 9 episode
- Poster designed by Andy Bottomley
- Episode no.: Series 4 Episode 5
- Directed by: Graeme Harper
- Written by: Steve Pemberton; Reece Shearsmith
- Original air date: 30 January 2018
- Running time: 29 minutes

Guest appearances
- Phoebe Sparrow as Jackie; Kenneth Cranham as Rupert; Noel Clarke as Gordon; Zoë Wanamaker as Paula; Fenella Woolgar as June

Episode chronology
← Previous "To Have and to Hold"	Next → "Tempting Fate"

"And the Winner Is..." is the fifth episode of series four of the British black comedy anthology television programme Inside No. 9. Written by Steve Pemberton and Reece Shearsmith, the episode was directed by Graeme Harper and was first shown on 30 January 2018, on BBC Two. It stars Pemberton, Shearsmith, Phoebe Sparrow, Kenneth Cranham, Noel Clarke, Zoë Wanamaker and Fenella Woolgar.
