= The Kit Curran Radio Show =

- Genre: Sitcom
- Created by: Andy Hamilton
- Directed by: Derrick Goodwin (series one); Anthony Parker (series two)
- Starring: Denis Lawson; Paul Brooke; Clive Merrison
- Opening theme: "Ultra Fantastico"
- Composer: David Mackay (lyrics by Ian La Frenais
- Country of origin: United Kingdom
- Original language: English
- No. of series: 2
- No. of episodes: 12

Production
- Producers: Derrick Goodwin (series one); Anthony Parker (series two)
- Production location: Newtown
- Running time: 12 x 24 minutes
- Production company: Thames Television

Original release
- Network: ITV (series 1); Channel 4 (series 2)
- Release: 2 April 1984 – 25 August 1986

The Kit Curran Radio Show is a British sitcom created and initially written by Andy Hamilton, and screened on ITV in 1984. A second series in 1986 was co-written with Guy Jenkin, the title reduced to simply Kit Curran.

Set in the fictional UK location of 'Newtown' (though exteriors are filmed in Bracknell), it stars Denis Lawson as devious radio DJ Kit Curran, Paul Brooke as his assistant, Les Toms, and Clive Merrison as newsreader Damien Appleby. The first series saw Kit clashing with new station boss Roland Simpson (Brian Wilde), while the second series saw Kit attempt to start his own pirate radio station, while fighting for the affection of Pamela Scott (Lindsay Duncan).

== Cast ==
- Denis Lawson as Kit Curran
- Paul Brooke as Les Toms
- Clive Merrison as Damien Appleby
- Brian Wilde as Roland Simpson (series one only)
- Lindsay Duncan as Pamela Scott (series two only)

== Guest cast ==
Two semi-regular cast members were Philip Dunbar, who played George, a caller to the station in every episode of the first series, and Joseph Marcell, who played Constantine, a security worker at the station. Notable guest cast members included Barbara Lott and Angus Mackay as BBC Radio Executives, Stephen Frost as a robber, Noel Coleman as a judge, Geoffrey Whitehead as a bank manager, Kevin Lloyd as an ambulance driver and Ray Burdis as 'Ray', a talent show entrant.

== Situation ==
In the first series, Kit (Denis Lawson) is a DJ on Radio Newtown, in the fictional location of Newtown. Episodes revolve around him trying to outwit the new station manager, Roland Simpson (Brian Wilde), and avoiding being fired. The second series saw Kit finally sacked from the station, along with studio engineer Les Toms (Paul Brooke) and newsreader Damien Appleby (Clive Merrison). The three go into business together, setting up a pirate radio station in hired offices in Brentford. While there, Kit tries to woo Pamela Scott (Lindsay Duncan), the manager of a neighbouring business.
(The fictional Newtown of the first series was filmed in Bracknell, and the second series opening credits show Kit looking at a road sign pointing to Brentford and the West End of London, deciding which route to take.)

== Episodes ==
There were two series, each of six episodes, as follows:

Series 1: The Kit Curran Radio Show (2 April 1984 – 7 May 1984)

1. "End of an Era" (2 April 1984)
2. "The New Broom" (9 April 1984)
3. "Bread and Circuses" (16 April 1984)
4. "P Is for Positive" (23 April 1984)
5. "Election Fever" (30 April 1984)
6. "The Big Break" (7 May 1984)

Series 2: Kit Curran (21 July 1986 – 25 August 1986)

1. "One Door Closes" (21 July 1986) (25'03m duration)
2. "The Lucky Break" (28 July 1986) (24'48m)
3. "The Street of Shame" (4 August 1986) (23'57m)
4. "A Sick Society" (11 August 1986) (25'02m)
5. "Blind Date" (18 August 1986) (23'41m)
6. "Doctors Can Seriously Damage Your Health" (25 August 1986) (23'42m)

== Theme tune ==
The theme tune, Ultra Fantastico, was composed by David Mackay with lyrics by Ian La Frenais. Sung by Denis Lawson, it was released as a single on EMI in 1984, scraping into the charts at number 99 for one week.

== Commercial release ==
Both series of the programme were repeated on UK Gold in the 1990s. A 2-disc set containing all 12 episodes was released on Region 2 DVD on 10/09/2018 by Network Distributing.

== Legacy ==
The programme receives little attention today, save for occasional mentions in unrelated articles, such as The Guardian citing radio sitcoms: 'Hence the comedy spoofs – Smashie and Nicey, Alan Partridge, or the 1980s Channel 4 sitcom The Kit Curran Radio Show – all bonhomie and smooth on air, but with a weird, desperate edge as soon as the red studio light goes off.'

James Rampton, writing for The Independent in 1994, slated the series. He stated, 'DJs have never been much fun on TV. Remember The Kit Curran Radio Show (ITV, 1984) with Denis Lawson? Exactly.'

The first season was suggested as being something of a failure for producer Derrick Goodwin in the book On The Buses: The Complete Story by Craig Walker. Walker describes the series as a 'short-lived affair' and that 'six episodes later the sitcom ended.'
