= Denis Lawson =

Scottish actor (born 1947)

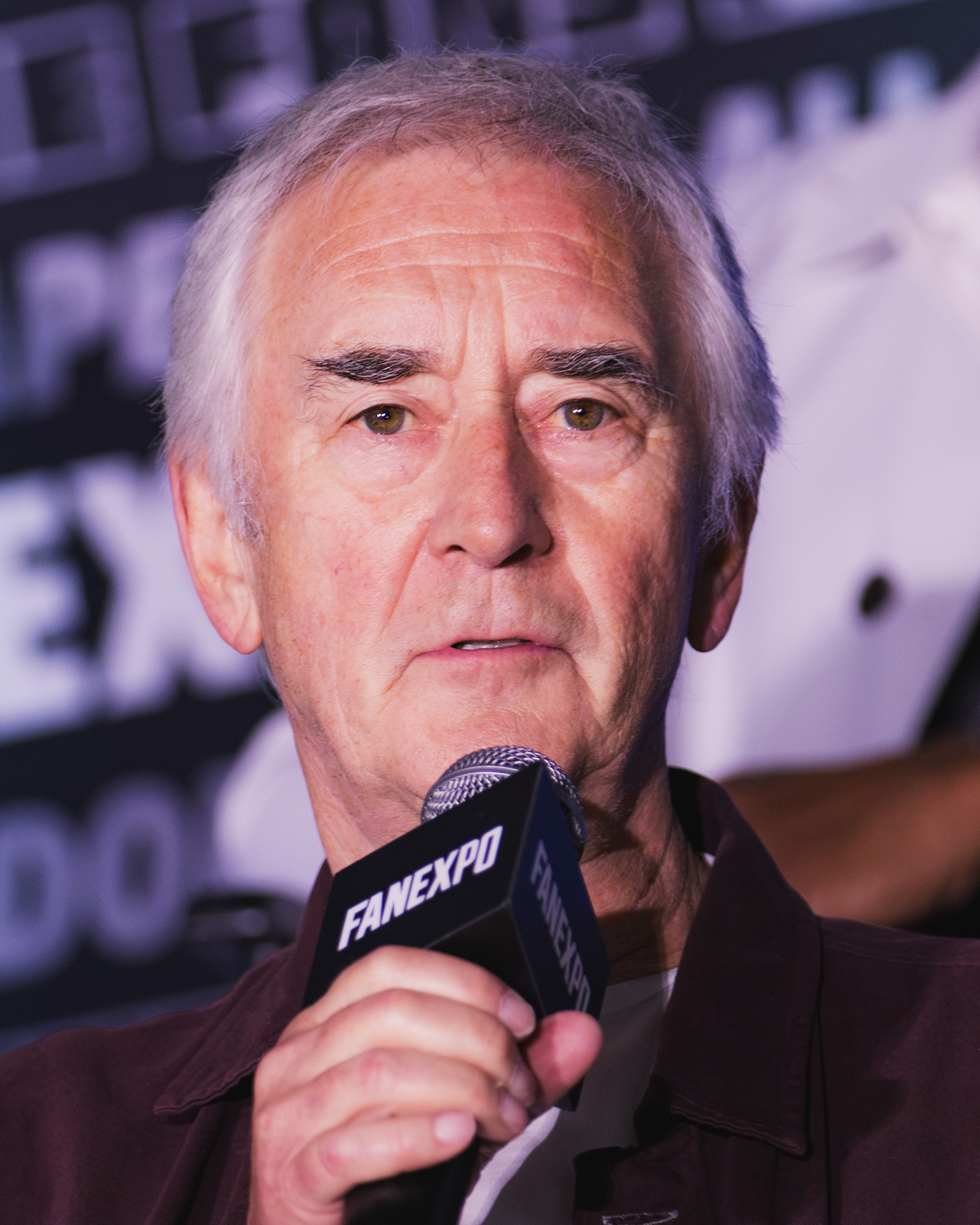
- Lawson in 2026
- Born: Denis Stamper Lawson; 27 September 1947 (age 79); Govan, Glasgow, Scotland
- Education: Royal Scottish Academy of Music and Drama
- Occupation: Actor
- Years active: 1969–present
- Spouses: Sheila Gish (m. 2004; died 2005) Karen Prentice (m. 2017)
- Children: 1
- Relatives: Ewan McGregor (nephew); Clara McGregor (grand-niece); Esther McGregor (grand-niece)

Denis Stamper Lawson (born 27 September 1947) is a Scottish actor. He is known for his roles as Wedge Antilles in the original Star Wars trilogy (1977–1983) and as John Jarndyce in the television miniseries Bleak House (2005), the latter of which earned him BAFTA Award and Primetime Emmy Award nominations. He also appeared in the television series The Kit Curran Radio Show (1984–1986), Holby City (2002–2004, 2019), and New Tricks (2012–2015), and reprised the role of Antilles in the film Star Wars: The Rise of Skywalker (2019). On the stage, he is a three-time Laurence Olivier Award for Best Actor in a Musical nominee, winning in 1983 for Mr Cinders.

== Early life ==
Lawson was born on 27 September 1947 in Govan, Glasgow, but grew up in Crieff, Perthshire, after his family moved there when he was three years old. He is the son of Phyllis Neno (née Stamper), a merchant, and Laurence Lawson, a watchmaker. Lawson was educated at Crieff Public School (now called Crieff Primary School). After the 11-plus examination, he attended Morrison's Academy as a day pupil before attending the Royal Scottish Academy of Music and Drama, having first unsuccessfully auditioned for the Royal Academy of Dramatic Art in London. He then sold carpets and did amateur theatre work for a year in Dundee before auditioning again at RADA in London and successfully at RSAMD in Glasgow.

== Career ==
Lawson began his acting career with a small role in a 1969 stage production of The Metamorphosis in London's West End. and has since starred in television dramas such as The Merchant of Venice (1973) opposite Laurence Olivier as Shylock, Rock Follies (1976) and Dead Head (1986).

Lawson played X-Wing pilot Wedge Antilles in all three films of the original Star Wars trilogy. In 1983, he played Gordon Urquhart in the film Local Hero. In 2001, he reprised the role of Wedge Antilles in voiceover form for the GameCube game Star Wars Rogue Squadron II: Rogue Leader and did the same for I Am Your Mother, an episode made by Aardman Animations for the Disney+ animated series Star Wars: Visions, in 2023.

He has appeared often on the West End stage, including in the musical Mr. Cinders at the Fortune Theatre from 1983 to 1984.

In 1985, Lawson appeared in two episodes of Victoria Wood As Seen on TV; in one episode performing a spoof love song with Wood called So Pissed off with Love.

In 1999, Lawson directed a production of Little Malcolm & His Struggle Against the Eunuchs which was first staged at the Hampstead Theatre before transferring to the Comedy Theatre in London's West End starring his nephew Ewan McGregor in the lead role of Malcolm Scrawdyke.

He appeared on an episode of Loose Ends hosted by Ned Sherrin on BBC Radio 4 on 10 December 2005.

In 2005, he played the leading role of John Jarndyce in the critically acclaimed BBC adaptation of Charles Dickens' Bleak House, receiving an Emmy nomination.p=152 Two years later he played Peter Syme in the BBC One drama serial Jekyll, a modern version of The Strange Case of Dr Jekyll and Mr Hyde. Lawson also appeared as Captain "Dreadnought" Foster in ITV's dramatisations of C. S. Forester's Hornblower. He appeared in Robin Hood in which he played the Harold of Winchester.

He also appeared in the West End playing the character of Georges in the revival of the musical hit La Cage Aux Folles. No stranger to musical theatre, Lawson previously starred in the London revival of Pal Joey.

He starred as the lead in Above Their Station, a sitcom for the BBC written by Rhys Thomas about Community Support Officers; it was made as a pilot but never commissioned, being shown only as a one-off special. Lawson appeared alongside actress Helena Bonham Carter in the BBC Four movie based on the life of Enid Blyton, playing Kenneth Darrell Waters, a London surgeon who becomes Blyton's second husband. In July 2009 Lawson appeared as Alexander Fleming in a BBC Four drama called Breaking the Mould: The Story of Penicillin alongside Dominic West. Lawson played the part of Alice's grandfather in ITV1's supernatural crime thriller Marchlands which was shown in February 2011.

Lawson appeared at the Royal Court Theatre once more in The Acid Test by Anya Reiss in 2011.

Lawson replaced James Bolam in the BBC One series New Tricks in its ninth series in 2012.

Lawson has said he was asked to reprise his role as Wedge Antilles in Star Wars: The Force Awakens, but reportedly turned down the role because he believed it would have "bored" him. However, Lawson later said he actually declined to appear in The Force Awakens due to a scheduling conflict, and would have appeared in the film had he been available. Lawson returned to the role in 2019's Star Wars: The Rise of Skywalker.

Lawson has also acted as narrator for a number of documentary series.

== Personal life ==
In 1973, he met actress Diane Fletcher in a stage production of Twelfth Night. They have a son together, Jamie (born 1979).

He met his wife, actress Sheila Gish, on the set of the 1985 film That Uncertain Feeling. They lived together for nearly 20 years before marrying in March 2004 in Antigua; she died of cancer a year later.

In 2017, he married Karen Prentice in Italy.

His nephew is actor Ewan McGregor, who went on to portray Obi-Wan Kenobi in the Star Wars prequel trilogy and a miniseries, Obi-Wan Kenobi. McGregor also had vocal cameos in The Force Awakens and The Rise of Skywalker.

When Lawson heard McGregor was cast as Obi-Wan, he was a little apprehensive saying, "I do think that huge movies like that can drive you into a cul-de-sac as an actor." However in a 2011 interview for Star Wars Insider, Lawson described McGregor as "an excellent actor and he has more than proven that."

== Filmography ==
=== Film ===
Year	Title	Role	Notes	Ref.
1977	Star Wars	Wedge Antilles		
1977	Holocaust 2000	Stevens		
1977	Providence	Dave Woodford		
1980	The Empire Strikes Back	Wedge Antilles		
1983	Bitter Cherry		Short film	
1983	Return of the Jedi	Wedge Antilles		
1983	Local Hero	Gordon Urquhart		
1984	The Chain	Keith		
1988	The Zip	Eric	Short film	
1996	Cervellini fritti impanati			
1998	The Round Tower	Arthur Brett	TV Film adaptation of Catherine Cookson Novel	
2001	Leonard	Leonard	Short film	
2006	Dolls	Monsieur Nicholas	Short film	
2011	Perfect Sense	Restaurant Owner		
2012	Broken	Mr Buckley		
2013	The Wee Man	Willie		
2013	The Machine	Thomson		
2019	Star Wars: The Rise of Skywalker	Wedge Antilles		

=== Television ===
Year(s)	Title	Role	Notes
1969	Dr. Finlay's Casebook	Andy Donald	1 episode: "Action, Dr. Cameron"
1973	The Merchant of Venice	Launcelot Gobbo	
1973	Beryl's Lot	Peter Jaret	1 episode: "Getting Up"
1974	Ms or Jill and Jack	Jerry	
1975	Survivors	Norman	1 episode: "The Future Hour"
1975	Rock Follies	Ken Church	
1976	Play for Today: Jumping Bean Bag	Snare	
1977	Providence	Dave Woodford	
1977	Seven Faces of Woman	Jerome	1 episode: "She: Anxious Anne"
1977	Rock Follies of '77	Ken Church	
1977	The Man in the Iron Mask	Claude	
1978	Armchair Thriller: The Girl Who Walked Quickly	David Cooper	
1978	Play of the Week: Fearless Frank	Ernest Dowson/Prof Byron Smith	
1979	Diary of a Nobody	Frank Mutlar	
1980	Play for Today: The Flipside of Dominick Hide	Felix	
1980	If Winter Comes		
1980	The Good Companions	Albert Tuggridge	2 episodes: "Stumbling Chronicles" "In Which We Meet the Company"
1982	Crown Court	John Dickens	1 episode: "Talking to the Enemy"
1983	Bergerac	Giroux	1 episode: "A Miracle Every Week"
1984	The Kit Curran Radio Show	Kit Curran	
1985	Victoria Wood As Seen on TV	Phiilip and Singer	2 episodes: Series 1, Episode 2 and 5
1985	That Uncertain Feeling	John Aneurin Lewis	
1986	Kit Curran	Kit Curran	
1986	Dead Head	Eddie Cass	
1987	Love After Lunch	Miles	
1989	Screen One: One Way Out	Bernard	
1989	The Justice Game	Dominic Rossi	
1990	Boon	James Marian	1 episode: "Bully Boys"
1991	Bejewelled	Alistair	
1992	El C.I.D.		1 episode: "My Brother's Keeper"
1992	Screen One: Born Kicking	Victor Grace	
1992	Natural Lies	James Towne	
1996	Tales from the Crypt	Frank	
1996	A Royal Scandal	Henry Brougham	
1997	Pie in the Sky	Nick Spencer	1 episode: "In the Smoke"
1998	Cold Feet	Alex Welch	1 episode: Series 1, Episode 4
1998	Hornblower	Captain 'Dreadnought' Foster	1 episode: "The Examination for Lieutenant"
1998	The Ambassador	John Stone	
1998	The Round Tower	Arthur Brett	
1999	Bob Martin	Greg	
2000	Other People's Children	Tom	Series 1, Episodes 2 and 3
2001	The Fabulous Bagel Boys	DI Morris Rose	TV film
2002–2004, 2019	Holby City	Tom Campbell-Gore	Regular character; 61 episodes
2003	The Ride	Tommy	
2003	A World in Arms	Narrator	
2003	Lucky Jim	Julius Gore-Urquat	
2005	Sensitive Skin	Al Jackson	
2005	Bleak House	John Jarndyce	
2006	Feel the Force	Gordon Campbell	
2006	The Thieving Headmistress	Father Plunkett	
2006	Dalziel and Pascoe	John Barron	2 episodes: "The Cave Woman", Parts 1 and 2
2007	Marple	Leo Argyle	1 episode: "Ordeal By Innocence"
2007	Jekyll	Peter Syme	
2007	Robin Hood	Harold of Winchester	1 episode: "For England!"
2008	Mumbai Calling	Phillip Glass	
2008	The Passion	Annas	Episode 1–3
2009	Law & Order: UK	Philip Woodleigh	1 episode: "Sacrifice"
2009	Criminal Justice	DCI Bill Faber	5 episodes
2009	Breaking the Mould – The Story of Penicillin	Alexander Fleming	TV film
2009	Enid	Kenneth Darrell Waters	TV film
2009	No Holds Bard	Miekel	TV film
2009	Mister Eleven	Len	2 episodes
2010	Above Their Station	Chief Constable Keith Boone	TV film
2010	Just William	Headmaster	2 episodes
2011	Hustle	Benny	Episode: "Benny's Funeral"
2011	Marchlands	Robert Bowen	5 episodes
2011	Candy Cabs	Kenny Ho	3 episodes
2012	Parade's End	Sir Reginald	2 episodes
2012–2015	New Tricks	DI Steve McAndrew	37 episodes
2014	Inside No. 9	Gerald	Episode: "A Quiet Night In"
2016	In Plain Sight	Laurence Dowdell	Episode 2
2016–2017	The Life of Rock with Brian Pern	Barry Patmore	2 episodes
2017	Victoria	Duke of Atholl	Episode: "The King Over the Water"
2018	Death in Paradise	Philip Marston	Episode: "Murder from Above"
2023	Star Wars: Visions	Wedge Antilles	Voice; Episode: "I Am Your Mother"
2024	Sister Boniface Mysteries	Lincoln Varsey	Episode: "House of Misfit Dolls"
2025	Father Brown	Walter Sullivan	Episode: "The Battle of Kembleford"
2025	Midsomer Murders	Piers Mayhew	Episode: "Top of the Class"
2026	The Fortune	Martin Worrall	3 episodes

=== Theatre ===
Year	Title	Character	Production	Notes
1971	Titus Andronicus	Martius	Round House Theatre	
1972	England's Ireland		Round House Theatre	
1973	Kaspar		Almost Free Theatre	
1973	Sarah B. Divine		Cochrane Theatre	
1975	Kidnapped at Christmas	Warder Mullins	Shaw Theatre	
1977	The Dog Ran Away	Brother David	Hampstead Theatre	
1977	Censored Scenes from King Kong	Stephen	Open Space Theatre	
1978	We Can't Pay! We Won't Pay!	Luigi	Half Moon Theatre	
1978	A Greenish Man	Patrick	Bush Theatre	
1979	Fifty Words—Bits of Lenny Bruce		King's Head Theatre	
1983–84	Mr Cinders	Jim Lancaster	King's Head Theatre then Fortune Theatre	won the 1983 Olivier Award for Best Actor in a Musical
1984	The Lucky Chance	Bellmour	Royal Court Theatre	
1986	Lend Me a Tenor	Max	Globe Theatre	
1986–87	Ashes	Colin	Bush Theatre	
1987	The Importance of Being Earnest	Algernon Moncrieff	Royalty Theatre	
1988	The Film Society	Jonathon Balton	Hampstead Theatre	
1990	Volpone	Mosca	Almeida Theatre	
1993	Oleanna	John	Duke of York's Theatre	
1995	Lust	Horner	Haymarket Theatre	
2008	La Cage Aux Folles	George	Playhouse Theatre	nominated for the 2009 Olivier Award for Best Actor in a Musical
2011	The Acid Test	Jim	Royal Court Theatre	
2018	Art	Marc	UK and Ireland tour	
2022	Anything Goes	Moonface Martin	Barbican	
2024	Inside No 9 Stage Fright	Himself	Wyndham's Theatre	

=== Video games ===
Year	Title	Role	Notes	Ref.
2001	Star Wars Rogue Squadron II: Rogue Leader	Wedge Antilles	Voice	
2020	Star Wars: Squadrons	Wedge Antilles	Voice	

== Print sources ==
Wilkins, Jonathan, ed. (2016). The Best of Star Wars Insider Volume 1 (paperback) (1st ed.). London: Titan Books. ISBN 9781785851162.
