= Fenella Woolgar =

English actress (born 1969)

- Born: 4 August 1969 (age 57); Hillingdon, England
- Education: Durham University; Royal Academy of Dramatic Art
- Occupation: Actress
- Years active: 1999–present
- Spouse: Robert Harland (m. 2006)
- Children: 3
- Website: fenellawoolgar.com

Fenella Woolgar (born 4 August 1969) is an English actress. Her films include Bright Young Things (2003), Cheerful Weather for the Wedding (2012), Swallows and Amazons (2016) and Victoria & Abdul (2017). On television, she is known for her roles in the BBC series Jekyll (2007) and Call the Midwife (2018–2022, 2025), the ITV war drama Home Fires (2015–2016), and the Apple TV+ series The Buccaneers (2023–2024). She also guest starred in episodes of Doctor Who (2008) as crime novelist Agatha Christie and Inside No. 9 (2018).

== Early life ==
Woolgar was born in London. Her mother is of Irish descent and she has joint UK and Irish citizenship. Woolgar's early years were spent in the Connecticut town of New Canaan. She was educated at Mayfield School, St Mary's College of Durham University, and then the Royal Academy of Dramatic Art.

At university, along with acting she directed Murder in the Cathedral in Durham Cathedral and wrote and performed comedy in the Durham Revue.

== Career ==
Following Woolgar's graduation from RADA she worked in repertory theatre at The Royal Exchange, Manchester, York Theatre Royal, Sheffield Crucible, and for the BBC in both television and radio.

She was cast as Agatha in Stephen Fry's film Bright Young Things for which she was nominated for a number of awards. She subsequently went on to work with Mike Leigh in Vera Drake and Mr. Turner, and Woody Allen in Scoop and You Will Meet a Tall Dark Stranger. Other notable films include Victoria and Abdul and Swallows and Amazons.

Woolgar's TV work includes series 1 and 2 of The Buccaneers for Apple TV, The Deal for Bande Apart films and as Margaret Thatcher in The Reckoning for the BBC. She did two series as Alison Scotlock in Home Fires. She joined Call the Midwife as Sister Hilda for 4 series. She played Agatha Christie in Doctor Who.

Woolgar has worked in theatre at the Royal Court, the Donmar, the National Theatre, the Old Vic and in the West End. She worked with Conor McPherson in The Veil at the National Theatre. She won the Clarence Derwent Award for Best Supporting Actress for her performance in Brian Friel’s adaptation of Hedda Gabler. She won the Sunday Times Culture Award for Stage Performance of the Year for playing Margaret Thatcher in Handbagged in the West End.

She is regularly heard on BBC radio and was nominated for Best Actress on the radio for An American Rose in which she played Rosemary Kennedy. Roles include Mrs Dalloway for BBC Radio 4 and Edith Wharton in both The Jinx Element and Ethan Frome. She starred in the titular role in BBC Radio 4 comedy Dot, written by Ed Harris. She has narrated many audiobooks and was nominated for Audio Book of the Year for Life after Life by Kate Atkinson.

She also paints portraits in oils and won Celebrity Portrait Artist of the Year.

== Awards and award nominations ==
- Stage Performance of the Year – The Sunday Times Culture Awards 2014
- Clarence Derwent Award for Best Supporting Actress in the West End 2013.

Woolgar has been nominated for several awards, including:

- Best Supporting Actress – What's On Stage Awards 2013
- Best Actress – BBC Radio Drama Awards 2013
- Best Audio Book of the Year (for Life After Life) 2013
- Best Supporting Actress – British Independent Film Awards 2003
- Best Supporting Actress – Empire Film Awards 2003
- Best Supporting Actress – London Critics Circle 2003
- Best Newcomer – Evening Standard Theatre Awards 2003
- Best Supporting Actress – Manchester Evening News Awards 2000 and 2001

== Filmography ==
=== Film ===
Year	Title	Role	Notes
2003	Bright Young Things	Agatha	Nominated - Empire Award for Best Newcomer; Nominated - London Film Critics' Circle Award for Supporting Actress of the Year; Nominated - British Independent Film Award for Most Promising Newcomer Nominated - Evening Standard Film Awards Best Newcomer
2003	Stage Beauty	Aurelia Meresvale	
2003	Vera Drake	Hester	
2004	Wah-Wah	June Broughton	
2006	Scoop	Jane Cook	
2007	St Trinian's	Miss Cleaver	
2009	You Will Meet a Tall Dark Stranger	Jane	
2012	Cheerful Weather for the Wedding	Nancy Dakin	
2013	Mr. Turner	Elizabeth Eastlake	
2016	Swallows and Amazons	Miss Crummock	
2016	Whisky Galore!	Dolly	
2017	Victoria & Abdul	Miss Phipps	
2019	Mr Jones	Miss Stephenson	
2019	Judy	Margaret Hamilton	
2024	The Choral	Lady Horsfall	

=== Television ===
Year	Title	Role	Notes
2000	Poirot	Ellis	Episode: "Lord Edgware Dies"
2001	People Like Us		Episode: "The Bank Manager"
2001	The Way We Live Now	Lady Julia Monogram	Mini-Series
2001	Mr Charity	Lady Sophie	Series Regular
2003	Eroica	Princess Marie Lobkowitz	TV film
2004	He Knew He Was Right	Arabella French	Mini-series
2006	Mr. Loveday's Little Outing	Angela Moping	TV film
2007	Jekyll	Min	Series regular
2008	Freezing	Heidi	1 episode
2008	Doctor Who	Agatha Christie	Episode: "The Unicorn and the Wasp"
2010	Agatha Christie’s Poirot	Miss Whittaker	Episode: "Hallowe'en Party"
2011	Silk	Wendy Ford	TV series, 1 episode
2011	Case Histories	Amelia Land	Part 1 & 2 "Case Histories"
2013	Spies of Warsaw	Lady Angela Hope	TV Mini-series, 4 episodes
2015-2016	Home Fires	Alison Scotlock	Series regular
2016	War & Peace	Catiche Kuragina	3 episodes
2017	The Halcyon	Lady Ashworth	1 episode
2017	Harlots	Lady Repton	4 episodes
2017	Quacks	Lady Campbell	2 episodes
2018-2022, 2025	Call the Midwife	Sister Hilda	Series regular
2018	Inside No. 9	June	Episode: "And the Winner Is....."
2018	Midsomer Murders	Hazel Webster	Episode: "Till Death Do Us Part"
2019	Plebs	Jocasta	Episode: "The Grumbrella"
2020	Unprecedented: Real Time Theatre from a State of Isolation	Tara	1 episode
2021	Dalgliesh	Sister Mavis Gearing	2 episodes: "Shroud for a Nightingale"
2023	The Reckoning	Margaret Thatcher	1 episode
2023-2024	The Buccaneers	Lady Brightlingsea	Main role
2024	The Deal	Margaret Davies	Main role
2025	Dreaming Whilst Black	Carol	Supporting Role

=== Theatre ===
- 1994: Nelly, Playboy of the Western World, Bristol Old Vic
- 1999: Varya, The Cherry Orchard, York Theatre Royal
- 2000: Lucy, Bring Me Sunshine, Royal Exchange, Manchester
- 2000: Kitty Verdun, Charley's Aunt, Sheffield Crucible
- 2000: Celia, As You Like It, Royal Exchange, Manchester
- 2001: Eleanor, The Miser, Salisbury Playhouse
- 2001: Teresa, How the Other Half Loves, Watford Palace Theatre
- 2002: Emma, Way Upstream, Derby Playhouse
- 2002: Helena, A Midsummer Night's Dream, Royal Exchange Theatre, Manchester
- 2004: Adela, A Passage to India, Shared Experience Theatre Company
- 2005: Charlotte Brontë, Brontë, Shared Experience Theatre Company
- 2006: Helen, Motortown, Royal Court, London
- 2009: Madge, Time and the Conways, National Theatre, London directed by Rupert Goold
- 2010: Charlotte, The Real Thing at the Old Vic, London
- 2011: Madeleine, The Veil by Conor McPherson, National Theatre, London, directed by Conor McPherson
- 2012: Thea Elvsted in Brian Friel's adaptation of Hedda Gabler, Old Vic, London
- 2013: Theresa in Circle Mirror Transformation, Royal Court Local Theatre, Rose Lipman Building, Haggerston, London
- 2013: Margaret Thatcher (Mags) in Handbagged by Moira Buffini, Tricycle Theatre, London
- 2014: Margaret Thatcher (Mags) in Handbagged, Vaudeville Theatre, London
- 2016: Valerie, Welcome Home Captain Fox, Donmar Warehouse, London
- 2017: Miss Roach, The Slaves of Solitude, Hampstead Theatre, London
- 2023: Lady Agrippina, Mates in Chelsea, Royal Court, London

=== Radio ===
Includes:

- Virginia Woolf in The Hours for BBC Radio 4, Polly Thomas and Judith Kampfner
- Poetry Please with Roger McGough for BBC Radio 4
- Book of the Week for Radio 4 including Only In Naples by Katherine Wilson and Millions Like Us by Virginia Nicholson
- Dot in Dot by Ed Harris, series 1 and 2
- Blood Sex and Money – Zola, BBC Radio 4 Polly Thomas written by Dan Rebellato
- Mrs Dalloway in Mrs Dalloway, BBC Radio 4 Marc Beeby
- Rosemary Kennedy in An American Rose, BBC Radio 4 Sally Avens
- Edith Wharton in Ethan Frome and in The Jinx Element, BBC Radio 4 Sally Avens
- Before They Were Famous, Hat Trick
- Flaw in the Motor, Dust in the Blood, BBC Radio 4, Toby Swift written by Trevor Preston
- Miss Bingley in Pride and Prejudice, as part of the Jane Austen BBC Radio Drama Collection

=== Audio ===
Includes:

- Life After Life and Transcription by Kate Atkinson
- The Other Family and Daughters in Law by Joanna Trollope
- Midwinter Murder: Fireside Tales from the Queen of Mystery, a collection of winter-themed short stories by Agatha Christie
- Dr. Sofia Lamb – BioShock 2

== See also ==
- List of RADA alumni
