= Inside No. 9 =

British comedy TV series (2014–2024)

- The series one DVD cover, featuring Pemberton (top) and Shearsmith (bottom) as they appeared in episode 1, "Sardines"
- Genre: Black comedy; Anthology series; Comedy drama; Horror
- Created by: Reece Shearsmith; Steve Pemberton
- Written by: Reece Shearsmith; Steve Pemberton
- Starring: Reece Shearsmith; Steve Pemberton; Various
- Composer: Christian Henson
- Country of origin: United Kingdom
- Original language: English
- No. of series: 9
- No. of episodes: 55

Production
- Executive producer: Jon Plowman
- Producer: Adam Tandy
- Production location: various
- Running time: 28–30 minutes
- Production company: BBC Studios Comedy Productions

Original release
- Network: BBC Two
- Release: 5 February 2014 – 12 June 2024

Inside No. 9 is a British black comedy anthology television programme written and created by Steve Pemberton and Reece Shearsmith. It aired on BBC Two from February 2014 to June 2024, running for 9 series and 55 episodes. Each 30-minute episode is a self-contained story with new characters and a new setting, almost all starring Pemberton or Shearsmith, usually both.

Aside from the writers, each episode has a new cast which has brought a wide range of guest actors to the series. The stories are linked only by a setting related to the number 9 in some way, and a brass hare statue that is hidden in all episodes. Themes and tone vary from episode to episode, but all have elements of comedy and horror or perverse humour, in addition to a plot twist.

Inside No. 9 received positive reviews from critics, holding a 100% rating on Rotten Tomatoes. Critics have praised the humour and creativity of the scripts, as well as the talent of the featured actors.

A one-hour documentary, Inside No. 9: The Party's Over, aired on BBC Two in December 2024. The documentary covered the making of the ninth and final series, with archive material and interviews with cast and crew.

In January 2025, Pemberton and Shearsmith wrote and starred in a West End stage play based on the series, titled Inside No. 9 Stage/Fright. The play was directed by Simon Evans and ran at the Wyndham's Theatre, London until April before embarking on a UK tour in the autumn and returning to London at the Hammersmith Apollo in January 2026.

== Format ==
Inside No. 9 is an anthology series, with each episode featuring a new story, new setting, and new characters. Episodes run roughly thirty minutes each, with the self-contained story reaching a conclusion. The stories are linked primarily by the fact that each has an element of the story linked to the number 9, be that a mansion, a dressing room or even a shoe, size 9. Almost every episode stars Reece Shearsmith or Steve Pemberton, and regularly both.

Each episode is effectively a short play. Some episodes take place in real-time, following half an hour in the lives of the characters. Every episode of Inside No. 9 features an ornamental hare somewhere on-screen. According to Pemberton, "Because each episode is so wildly different there was nothing really linking them other than the fact they were all inside a Number Nine, I just thought it would be nice to have an object that you could hide and just have there on every set." There is, however, no particular significance to the hare itself.

As is typical of Shearsmith and Pemberton's work, the scripts address dark topics, with, for instance, the first episode touching upon incest, child sexual abuse and murder. The plotlines make use of twists and surprises of various sorts, though in some cases the surprise is the lack of twist. In an interview, Pemberton said that "there is always a desire to wrong-foot the viewer. That's what you strive to do".

The tone varies episode-by-episode. For example, while gothic horror was a major component in one case, other times slapstick comedy was used extensively. The humour is typically dark and British. The episodes generally begin with scenes of "utter banality", before the darker elements are revealed. Despite the various episodes featuring unrelated plots and characters, one reviewer said that they are all linked "by a mercurial synthesis of morbid comedy, wicked social commentary and a genuine creepiness".

Inside No. 9 is somewhat more grounded and realistic than the writers' previous work, such as Psychoville and The League of Gentlemen. Pemberton said that he and Shearsmith decided not to mix the worlds of Inside No. 9 and their previous projects, but include the occasional reference. For example, a character called "Ollie" is mentioned in one Inside No. 9 episode, and the writers imagined that this was Ollie Plimsoles of Legz Akimbo, a character from The League of Gentlemen.

Similarly, Inside No. 9 was referenced in the 2017 reunion specials of The League of Gentlemen. Tubbs and Edward are seen living in flat number 9, and the Inside No. 9 hare is visible on their shop counter. In the 2018 Halloween special, in which Pemberton and Shearsmith play versions of themselves, both the League of Gentlemen and another of its writers, Mark Gatiss, are directly referred to in the dialogue. The 2020 episode "Death Be Not Proud" directly referenced Psychoville by featuring various characters from the series in that particular episode.

== Production and development ==
In 2012, after finishing their previous show, Psychoville, writers Pemberton and Shearsmith were commissioned to produce two series for the BBC by controllers Janice Hadlow and Cheryl Taylor, partially in response to Sky beginning to produce comedy. At the time, it was unclear whether this would be two series of Inside No. 9, then known by the working title Happy Endings, or a series of Inside No. 9 and a series of some other programme. Inside No. 9 was to be produced by a BBC team, which was later revealed to be David Kerr (director), Jon Plowman (executive producer) and Adam Tandy (producer).

Pemberton and Shearsmith took inspiration for Inside No. 9 from "David and Maureen", episode 4 of the first series of Psychoville, which was in turn inspired by Alfred Hitchcock's Rope. This episode took place entirely in a single room, and was filmed in only two shots. The writers were keen to explore other stories in this bottle episode or TV play format, and Inside No. 9 allowed them to do this. At the same time, the concept of Inside No. 9 was a "reaction" to Psychoville, with Shearsmith saying that the two of them had "been so involved with labyrinthine over-arcing, we thought it would be nice to do six different stories with a complete new house of people each week. That's appealing, because as a viewer you might not like this story, but you've got a different one next week." Elsewhere, Shearsmith explained that the pair returned to writing macabre stories as they "always feel slightly unfulfilled if [they] write something that's purely comedic, [as] it just feels too frivolous and light". The first story that the pair wrote specifically for Inside No. 9 was about a birthday party. BBC producers felt that this story would work as the opening episode of a sitcom, but, given the script's events, Pemberton and Shearsmith were not happy to develop the idea into its own programme. The script was consequently shelved and revisited during the planning process for the second series, becoming "Nana's Party", the fifth episode of the series and eleventh overall. During the filming of Inside No. 9, Shearsmith professed excitement to be working on the programme, saying that "[b]eing in the middle of filming a third series of Psychoville would be utterly depressing". Pemberton and Shearsmith aimed for a simpler experience with Inside No. 9 than they had experienced with Psychoville, describing "Sardines", Inside No. 9's first episode, by saying that it was "just about some good actors in a wardrobe with a good story."

At the time of Inside No. 9's production, the anthology series was a rare genre for British television programmes. Previous horror anthologies include Tales of the Unexpected, The Twilight Zone and Alfred Hitchcock Presents; while these would sometimes use comedic elements, they are more prominent in Inside No. 9. Murder Most Horrid followed a similar format, but was far more comedic than horrific. Other anthology-like series on British television include Seven of One and Comedy Playhouse, though these programmes lacked horror elements, and, unlike Inside No. 9, served as pilots for potential series. However, the British anthology show Black Mirror, which also features elements of comedy and horror, was very popular around the time of Inside No. 9. For Pemberton, the 1970s and 1980s were "full of" anthology shows; other examples included Play for Today, Beasts and Armchair Thriller. More recently, anthologies have become less popular with television executives, but the writers hope that they may be able to contribute to a "renaissance" for the genre. According to journalist and broadcaster Mark Lawson, this is because anthologies can fail to motivate viewers to stay with a series, and, further, new sets and casts are required for each episode, meaning that a six-part anthology series will generally be more expensive than a six-part series in a more standard format. For Lawson, Inside No. 9 was able to overcome these problems through the "pleasing coherence" offered by the fact each episode was set in a number 9, and "the wit and inventiveness" of the opening episodes, which could sufficiently engage viewers. Pemberton and Shearsmith had originally considered alternative ways to link the stories, such as all the settings having a shared post man, but then decided that such a strong relationship between stories was not needed.

The first series was broadcast in 2014, alongside a special online-only cinemagraph-based webisode. The BBC ordered a second series of Inside No. 9 before the first episode had aired. Inspiration and production varied from instalment to instalment, and each was filmed separately, taking less than a week per episode. After Shearsmith and Pemberton had decided that each episode would be about confinement, and having written some of the later episodes, they were inspired by a wardrobe in their working space for "Sardines". The writers were keen to see how confined they could make the characters, aiming to induce feelings of claustrophobia in viewers. The anthology format allowed Pemberton and Shearsmith to revisit prior ideas, which is what they did with "A Quiet Night In" and "Tom & Gerri". The former was inspired by the writers' efforts to include a long segment without dialogue in an episode of Psychoville. Both episodes followed break-ins. The Pinteresque "Tom & Gerri" was based upon a play written by Pemberton and Shearsmith while the pair were living together and job seeking. The setting was based upon their own flat, while the character Tom's development evoked the experience of job-hunting. "Last Gasp" was inspired by a person Pemberton had seen on Multi-Coloured Swap Shop who collected jars of air, as well as the death of Michael Jackson and the death of Amy Winehouse. "The Understudy", the plot of which is partially based upon and concerns Macbeth, took longer to write than any other episode; the writers rewrote the script several times, as they were unsure of whether the characters should be amateur or professional actors. "The Harrowing" was the writers' attempt to produce a gothic horror episode. They made use of more horror tropes than previous episodes, but the setting allowed them to include modern elements.

The second series was written in 2014, and then filmed from the end of 2014 into early 2015. The writers were permitted two sets for the second series, and so a fake train compartment and a fake flat (for "La Couchette" and "The 12 Days of Christine" respectively) were built at Twickenham Studios. The other episodes were filmed on location; for example, "The Trial of Elizabeth Gadge" was filmed in a barn at the Chiltern Open Air Museum. David Kerr was unable to stay on as director for the second series. Guillem Morales and Dan Zeff each took on directorial duties for two episodes, and Pemberton and Shearsmith, in addition to continuing to write and star in the episodes, jointly directed the other two. The writers had hoped to direct for some time, and this represented a good opportunity to make their directorial debut. While writing for the series, the pair did not know which episodes they would be directing; in an interview, Shearsmith said that the pair had considered directing episodes in which they did not appear much, but scheduling concerns left them with "Cold Comfort" and "Nana's Party"; the episodes feature the writers quite heavily.

The six episodes of the second series derived inspiration from a variety of sources. "La Couchette" aimed to explore the intimacy of sleeper carriages; specifically, the unusual problems associated with sleeping in close proximity to strangers. "The 12 Days of Christine" follows a woman over the course of 12 years, with scenes displaying key moments in her life. "The Trial of Elizabeth Gadge" was inspired by genuine witch trials, some transcripts of which Pemberton and Shearsmith had read as part of the writing process. "Cold Comfort" began with the idea of a call centre, and was filmed in the style of a CCTV feed. With "Nana's Party", the writers aimed for a feeling of suburban darkness, reminiscent of the work of Alan Ayckbourn. "Séance Time" began with the idea of a séance, an idea the writers had wanted to explore for some time.

Series three began with a Christmas special in December 2016, followed by five more episodes starting February 2017. with a Christmas special, "The Devil of Christmas", airing on 27 December 2016. Settings for the third series include an art gallery, a restaurant and an alpine cabin, while guest stars include Keeley Hawes, Jessica Raine, Felicity Kendal, Tamzin Outhwaite, Fiona Shaw, Jason Watkins, Mathew Baynton, Rula Lenska, Philip Glenister, Sarah Hadland, Javone Prince, Montserrat Lombard, Morgana Robinson, and Alexandra Roach.

A fourth series was confirmed after the airing of "The Devil of Christmas", and began broadcast in 2018. Pemberton has said that he would be interested in an online spin-off, perhaps called No. 9A, with less experienced comedy writers. In an interview, he said "The format has so many opportunities and can incorporate so many styles, as long as you stick to the small cast, single location constraint. I think it's really important to bring through fresh voices." The show's fifth series was commissioned in February 2018, and aired in 2020.

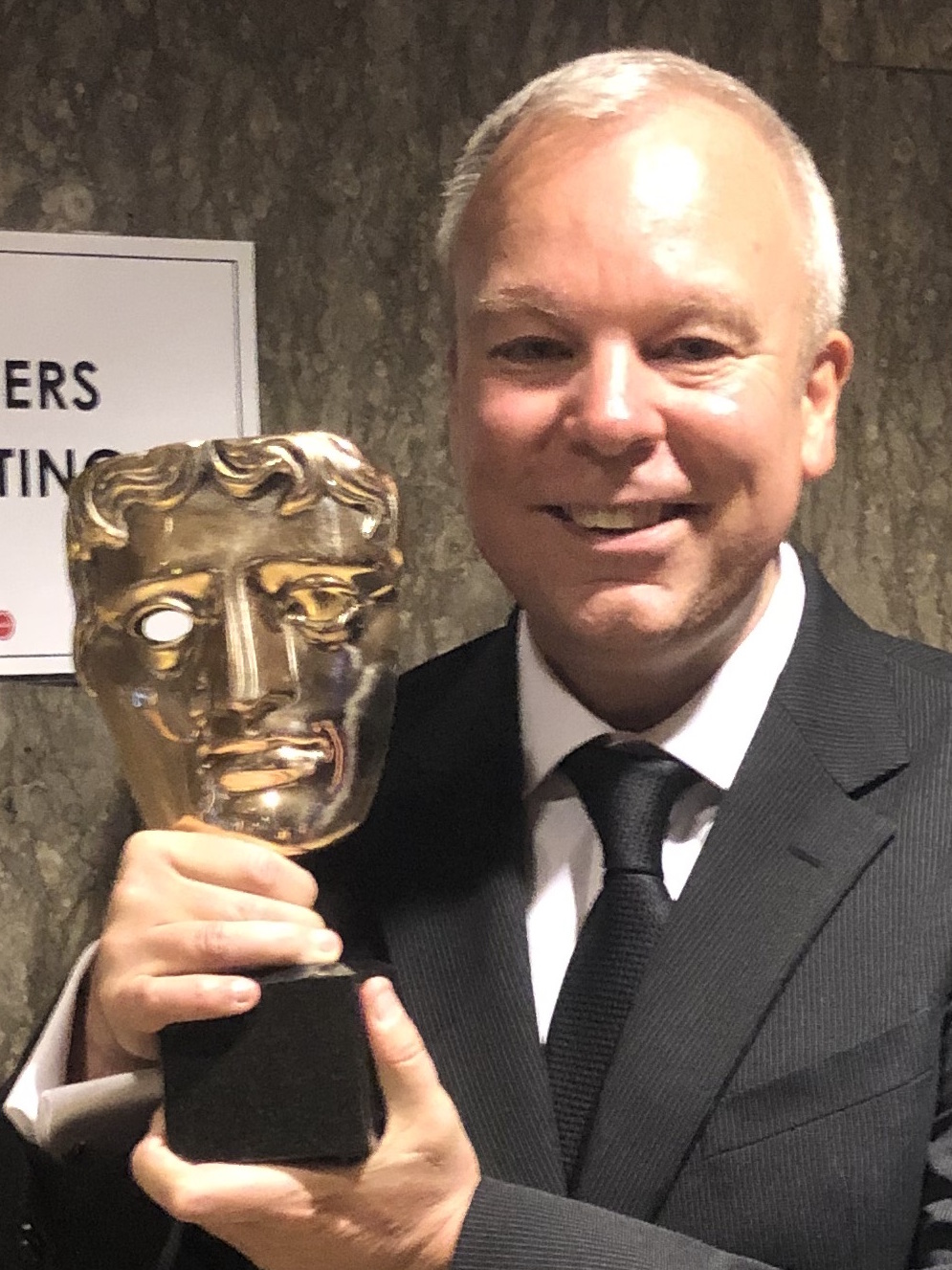
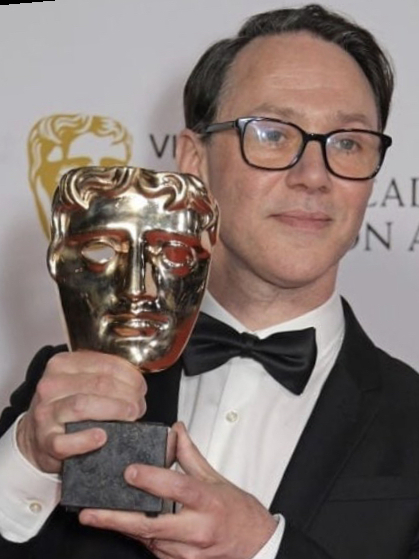
Steve Pemberton and Reece Shearsmith, with their BAFTA TV Awards for Inside No. 9

A live special in October 2018 received particular praise for its unusual and creative format. The episode, described as "astonishingly bold and ambitious" by reviewer Sean O'Grady, appeared to suffer technical difficulties within its first 9 minutes of broadcast. The difficulties, including the continuity announcer's voiceover, were in fact part of the programme's plot, which centred on the premise that the studios in which the episode was being filmed were haunted. Around 20% of the audience reportedly switched off before the deception became apparent. The plot included a number of features playing with the live format, including Shearsmith and Pemberton watching the live broadcast, and Shearsmith sending a tweet during the show.

The sixth series aired in 2021, followed by a seventh series in 2022. After the finale, the BBC announced that they had commissioned two further series of the show, bringing it to nine series. Series 8 premiered on 22 December 2022 with a Christmas special, with the remaining five episodes airing from April 2023.

In December 2022, it was revealed that Inside No. 9 would stop after its ninth series. Pemberton said: "We feel it is a good time to pause Inside No. 9 after we finish filming season 9 next year [...] We're not saying it's over for good [...] but we won't be looking to make any more episodes for the time being." The ninth and final series began airing in May 2024.

A one-hour documentary, Inside No. 9: The Party's Over, aired on BBC One on 22 December 2024. The documentary gave a behind-the-scenes look at filming the last ever series, plus interviews with cast and crew from the nine series.

In January 2025 Pemberton and Shearsmith wrote and starred in a West End stage play based on the series, titled Inside No. 9 Stage/Fright. The play was directed by Simon Evans and ran at the Wyndham's Theatre, London until April, before embarking on a UK tour in the autumn. In November 2025, it was announced that it would return to London for a final time, with six more shows at the Hammersmith Apollo in January 2026.

== Episodes ==
=== Series overview ===
Series	Episodes	Originally released	
Series	Episodes	First released	Last released
1	6	5 February 2014	12 March 2014
Webisode		12 February 2014	
2	6	26 March 2015	29 April 2015
3	6	27 December 2016	21 March 2017
4	6	2 January 2018	6 February 2018
Special		28 October 2018	
5	6	3 February 2020	9 March 2020
6	6	10 May 2021	14 June 2021
7	6	20 April 2022	1 June 2022
8	6	22 December 2022	25 May 2023
9	6	8 May 2024	12 June 2024

=== Series 1 (2014) ===
No. overall	No. in series	Title	Location	Directed by	Original release date	UK viewers (millions)
1	1	"Sardines"	Country estate bedroom	David Kerr	5 February 2014	1.06
Rebecca (Katherine Parkinson) and Jeremy (Ben Willbond) hold an engagement party at Rebecca's family's mansion. The guests play the parlour game sardines, in which one person hides and the other players have to join them in their hiding place once they are found. As Rebecca's friends and family are packed into a wardrobe, secrets are gradually revealed.
2	2	"A Quiet Night In"	Modernist house	David Kerr	12 February 2014	0.94
Hapless cat burglars Eddie (Pemberton) and Ray (Shearsmith) break into a luxury house to try to steal a painting while Gerald (Denis Lawson) and Sabrina (Oona Chaplin), the couple who live in the house, argue. The episode progresses almost entirely without dialogue.
3	3	"Tom & Gerri"	Flat	David Kerr	19 February 2014	1.00
Tom (Shearsmith) is a frustrated primary school teacher and aspiring author. One night, a homeless man named Migg (Pemberton) returns Tom's lost wallet, and Migg ends up living with Tom, to the frustration of Tom's girlfriend Gerri (Gemma Arterton). Tom's life changes dramatically as a result.
4	4	"Last Gasp"	Suburban house	David Kerr	26 February 2014	0.87
Pop star Frankie J Parsons (David Bedella), accompanied by assistant Si (Adam Deacon) and WishmakerUK representative Sally (Tamsin Greig), visits the sick Tamsin (Lucy Hutchinson) on her ninth birthday, but suddenly collapses – and appears to have died – while blowing up a balloon. Graham (Pemberton), Tamsin's father, realises that Frankie's last breath could be highly valuable, and he, Sally and Si argue over ownership of the balloon.
5	5	"The Understudy"	Dressing room	David Kerr	5 March 2014	0.72
Successful West End actor Tony (Pemberton) is starring in a production of Shakespeare's Macbeth. His understudy Jim (Shearsmith) has always wanted a starring role, and Jim's fiancée Laura (Lyndsey Marshal) encourages him to push for Tony's job. The episode is written in five acts, and is loosely based upon the plot of Macbeth.
6	6	"The Harrowing"	Gothic mansion	David Kerr	12 March 2014	0.83
Katy (Aimee-Ffion Edwards) is hired to housesit the Gothic mansion where Hector (Shearsmith) and Tabitha (Helen McCrory) live, while the pair attend an important event. The house is filled with paintings depicting Hell, and kept below freezing for Hector and Tabitha's severely disabled brother, Andras (Sean Buckley), who is staying in his bedroom upstairs. Andras is not to be disturbed.

==== Webisode (2014) ====
Title	Directed by	Original release date
"The Inventors"	Martin Stirling	12 February 2014
This webisode stars Tom Verall and Dan Renton Skinner as brothers whose mother died in the Great Storm of 1987. The story is told through a series of cinemagraphs with dialogue. The episode is interactive, advancing only with input from the viewer. "The Inventors" was written by Ed Hime, developed by media agency Kanoti, and produced by Jon Aird, who had previously produced BAFTA-winning online content for Psychoville, with executive producer Will Saunders.

=== Series 2 (2015) ===
No. overall	No. in series	Title	Location	Directed by	Original release date	UK viewers (millions)
7	1	"La Couchette"	Sleeper train carriage	Guillem Morales	26 March 2015	1.69
English doctor Maxwell (Shearsmith) attempts to settle in a French sleeper carriage. He is disturbed first by drunk, flatulent German Jörg (Pemberton), then by English couple Kath (Julie Hesmondhalgh) and Les (Mark Benton). When Australian backpacker Shona (Jessica Gunning) brings the posh Hugo (Jack Whitehall) back to the carriage, they make a discovery.
8	2	"The 12 Days of Christine"	Flat	Guillem Morales	2 April 2015	1.69
Christine (Sheridan Smith) meets Adam (Tom Riley) at a New Year party. Her life begins to unravel around her as events seem to take place out of sequence and she is haunted by visions of an unknown man. The episode takes place over twelve holidays and important occasions in Christine's lifetime, at intervals of 13 months.
9	3	"The Trial of Elizabeth Gadge"	Barn	Dan Zeff	9 April 2015	1.41
In the 17th century, villager Elizabeth Gadge (Ruth Sheen) stands accused of witchcraft; she will be burnt at the stake if found guilty. Magistrate Sir Andrew Pike (David Warner) summons renowned witch-finders Mr Warren (Shearsmith) and Mr Clarke (Pemberton) to investigate, planning to use the trial to increase interest in the village.
10	4	"Cold Comfort"	Call centre	Steve Pemberton and Reece Shearsmith	16 April 2015	1.46
Andy (Pemberton) starts work at the Comfort Support Line, a crisis support line with manager George (Shearsmith), the gossipy Liz (Jane Horrocks) and the officious Joanne (Nikki Amuka-Bird). A difficult call from a suicidal teenage girl leads to a series of problems. The episode is filmed in the style of a CCTV feed.
11	5	"Nana's Party"	Suburban house	Steve Pemberton and Reece Shearsmith	23 April 2015	1.53
Angela (Claire Skinner) hosts a birthday party for her 79-year-old mother, Maggie (Elsie Kelly), while Angela's husband Jim (Pemberton) plans to play a practical joke on Pat (Shearsmith), the husband of Angela's alcoholic sister Carol (Lorraine Ashbourne). The episode opens with the arrival of a paramedic, before flashing back to before the beginning of the party.
12	6	"Séance Time"	Victorian villa	Dan Zeff	29 April 2015	1.14
A young woman Tina, (Sophie McShera), visits a medium for a séance. After being shown in to a room in a Victorian villa by "Hives" (Shearsmith), she is introduced to "Madam Talbot" (Alison Steadman), an elderly woman shrouded in black.

=== Series 3 (2016–17) ===
No. overall	No. in series	Title	Location	Directed by	Original release date	UK viewers (millions)
13	1	"The Devil of Christmas"	Alpine chalet	Graeme Harper	27 December 2016	1.03
In a film within the episode, an English family (Pemberton, Rula Lenska, Jessica Raine and George Bedford) travel to an Austrian chalet in December 1977. They are told the story of the Krampus by their guide (Shearsmith). Meanwhile, the film's director (Derek Jacobi) provides audio commentary.
14	2	"The Bill"	Restaurant table	Guillem Morales	21 February 2017	1.47
Three northerners – Archie (Shearsmith), Malcolm (Pemberton) and Kevin (Jason Watkins) – take a southerner Craig (Philip Glenister) for a tapas meal, but an argument breaks out over who should pay. To the consternation of the waitress (Ellie White), each of the four men attempts to pay the total bill.
15	3	"The Riddle of the Sphinx"	Study	Guillem Morales	28 February 2017	1.37
Nina (Alexandra Roach) breaks into the office of Cambridge Professor Nigel Squires (Pemberton), who publishes cryptic crosswords in the student newspaper Varsity as "The Sphinx". Squires proceeds to teach Nina how to solve cryptic crosswords using the next day's puzzle.
16	4	"Empty Orchestra"	Karaoke booth	Guillem Morales	7 March 2017	1.26
Greg (Shearsmith), Fran (Sarah Hadland), Connie (Tamzin Outhwaite), Janet (Emily Howlett) and Duane (Javone Prince) enter a karaoke booth in fancy dress to celebrate the promotion of their manager Roger (Pemberton). The character's relationships are revealed both through their explicit interactions and their karaoke performances.
17	5	"Diddle Diddle Dumpling"	Suburban house	Guillem Morales	14 March 2017	1.50
David (Shearsmith), a stay-at-home dad, finds a man's shoe while out jogging. He becomes fixated on finding the shoe's owner, straining his relationship with his wife Louise (Keeley Hawes).
18	6	"Private View"	Gallery space	Guillem Morales	21 March 2017	1.16
Carrie (Morgana Robinson), Patricia (Felicity Kendal), Maurice (Shearsmith), Kenneth (Pemberton) and Jean (Fiona Shaw) attend a private retrospective art exhibition. They are met by the waitress Bea (Montserrat Lombard), but none knows why they have been invited.

=== Series 4 (2018) ===
No. overall	No. in series	Title	Location	Directed by	Original release date	UK viewers (millions)
19	1	"Zanzibar"	Hotel floor	David Kerr	2 January 2018	2.19
Told through the style of iambic pentameter, various guests arrive at Hotel Zanzibar where they find themselves interacting with one another in a variety of ways, from murder to a proposal.
20	2	"Bernie Clifton's Dressing Room"	Church hall	Graeme Harper	9 January 2018	1.93
Double-act Cheese (Shearsmith) and Crackers (Pemberton) have reunited after 30 years to perform in front of an audience, but an incident that caused them to fall out comes back into the limelight.
21	3	"Once Removed"	Country farmhouse	Jim O'Hanlon	16 January 2018	2.15
Removal man Spike (Nick Moran) arrives to help Natasha (Emilia Fox) move house, leading him into bizarre circumstances which unfold through reverse chronology.
22	4	"To Have and to Hold"	Suburban terrace house	David Kerr	23 January 2018	1.92
When wedding photographer Adrian (Pemberton) seems bored by his marriage to Harriet (Nicola Walker), focusing instead on jigsaws and Pot Noodles, his wife desires to renew their wedding vows. However, she discovers a dark secret.
23	5	"And the Winner Is…"	Meeting room	Graeme Harper	30 January 2018	1.91
We join the jury (Pemberton, Shearsmith, Zoë Wanamaker, Noel Clarke, Phoebe Sparrow, Fenella Woolgar, and Kenneth Cranham) of the Royal Academy of Motion Picture Arts as they decide who is going to win the Best Actress award. But only one of the eight actresses can be chosen.
24	6	"Tempting Fate"	Flat	Jim O'Hanlon	6 February 2018	1.82
Council contractors Keith (Pemberton), Nick (Shearsmith) and Maz (Weruche Opia) clear out the flat of a dead hoarder. When they unveil the content of the man's safe, their lives will never be the same again.

=== Halloween special (2018) ===
This episode was a live broadcast, rather than a pre-recorded episode. The music, by Christian Henson, was also performed live.

No. overall	Title	Location	Directed by	Original release date	UK viewers (millions)
25	"Dead Line"	Television studio	Barbara Wiltshire	28 October 2018	N/A (<1.40) (Note: Not reported in the weekly top 15 programmes for four-screen viewer ratings.)
Prior to broadcast, an episode synopsis was released to the press: "When Arthur Flitwick finds an old mobile phone in his local graveyard, he makes the mistake of trying to contact the owner, but some mysteries are best left unsolved and as Halloween draws near Arthur is plunged into a nightmare of his own making." Pemberton and Shearsmith also conducted interviews about the planned episode. However, a few minutes into transmission, a series of apparent 'technical errors' began to occur, and eventually the show was 'abandoned'. In fact, it soon became clear that the actual storyline centred on the live broadcast descending into deadly chaos as supernatural forces assailed the cast, crew, props and even the continuity announcer.

=== Series 5 (2020) ===
No. overall	No. in series	Title	Location	Directed by	Original release date	UK viewers (millions)
26	1	"The Referee's a W***er"	Football changing room	Matt Lipsey	3 February 2020	1.66
Tensions are high in the referees' changing room before, during and after the ref's (David Morrissey) last game before retirement.
27	2	"Death Be Not Proud"	Flat	Matt Lipsey	10 February 2020	1.44
When young couple Beattie (Jenna Coleman) and Sam (Kadiff Kirwan) move into a new flat at a knockdown price, strange things occur... which are made only stranger when the previous owner, David Sowerbutts (Pemberton), returns. This episode references Psychoville.
28	3	"Love's Great Adventure"	Council house	Guillem Morales	17 February 2020	1.35
Trevor (Pemberton) and Julia (Debbie Rush) always try to make Christmas special for their family but with money running low it is going to be more difficult than usual this year. This episode was semi-improvised.
29	4	"Misdirection"	Storage unit	Guillem Morales	24 February 2020	N/A (<1.39)
A magician (Shearsmith) kills another magician (Pemberton) to steal a trick. Years later, he is interviewed by a student journalist (Fionn Whitehead), leading to a battle of wits between the two.
30	5	"Thinking Out Loud"	House (other locations also seen)	Steve Pemberton	2 March 2020	N/A (<1.42)
Disparate characters – a widower looking for a partner (Phil Davis), a woman in therapy (Maxine Peake), an American serial killer (Pemberton), a young internet celebrity (Ioanna Kimbook), a terminally ill man (Shearsmith) and a blind woman (Sandra Gayer) – talk to the camera, not knowing their lives are about to collide.
31	6	"The Stakeout"	Police car	Guillem Morales	9 March 2020	N/A (<1.46)
PC Thompson (Pemberton)'s partner was stabbed to death a month ago. The murder weapon has gone missing and his new partner SPC Varney (Shearsmith) is asking him questions.

=== Series 6 (2021) ===
No. overall	No. in series	Title	Location	Directed by	Original release date	UK viewers (millions)
32	1	"Wuthering Heist"	Abandoned sound stage	Guillem Morales	10 May 2021	1.88
Pantalone (Paterson Joseph) has hired a gang to carry out a diamond robbery, unaware that half the gang is planning to double-cross the others. This episode is performed in the style of Commedia dell'arte and also alludes to Reservoir Dogs.
33	2	"Simon Says"	Flat	Guillem Morales	17 May 2021	N/A (<1.40)
TV fantasy drama The Ninth Circle has ended with a disappointing finale, so devoted fan Simon Smethurst (Shearsmith) visits its showrunner Spencer Maguire (Pemberton) to encourage him to write a further series of it.
34	3	"Lip Service"	Hotel room	Guillem Morales	24 May 2021	1.42
Felix Hughes (Pemberton) hires lip reader Iris (Sian Clifford) to watch his wife Brenda Doyle in a Central London hotel room using binoculars. He suspects Brenda is cheating on him with anti-government campaigner Dmitri Novak, whose press secretary she is.
35	4	"Hurry Up and Wait"	Caravan	Matt Lipsey	31 May 2021	N/A (<1.33)
Actor James (Shearsmith) waits in a static caravan owned by an odd family (Donna Preston, Pauline McLynn, Pemberton). He is playing a policeman in a crime drama starring Adrian Dunbar, based on the real-life disappearance of a baby boy, Ryan, from the area.
36	5	"How Do You Plead?"	Old apartment	Guillem Morales	7 June 2021	1.23
Celebrated barrister D. Webster (Derek Jacobi) is dying and has a guilty conscience, so he calls for his carer Bedford (Shearsmith) to get something off his chest.
37	6	"Last Night of the Proms"	Manor house	Matt Lipsey	14 June 2021	1.20
Dawn (Sarah Parish) and Mick (Pemberton) are hosting their annual Last Night of the Proms party, determined to enjoy the pomp and ceremony, but it seems not everyone is singing from the same hymn sheet.

=== Series 7 (2022) ===
No. overall	No. in series	Title	Location	Directed by	Original release date	UK viewers (millions) 7 day (Note: No platform data.)
38	1	"Merrily, Merrily"	Pedalo	Al Campbell	20 April 2022	N/A (Note: 590,000 overnight.)
Three friends (Shearsmith, Pemberton, Mark Gatiss) reunite for a boat ride, with at least one unexpected guest (Diane Morgan).
39	2	"Mr King"	Primary school classroom	Louise Hooper	27 April 2022	N/A
A teacher (Shearsmith) starts his new job in a rural Welsh primary school, where he is overshadowed by the memory of previous teacher Mr King.
40	3	"Nine Lives Kat"	House	Kieron J. Walsh	11 May 2022	1.22
Alcoholic DI Kat (Sophie Okonedo) is determined to solve the case of a missing boy.
41	4	"Kid/Nap"	Abandoned property	Al Campbell	18 May 2022	1.11
The kidnapping of Lara (Daisy Haggard) by two strange men (Daniel Mays, Jason Isaacs) doesn't go quite according to plan. This episode is presented mostly in split-screen.
42	5	"A Random Act of Kindness"	Suburban house	Kieron J. Walsh	25 May 2022	N/A
The relationship between a single mother (Jessica Hynes) and her teenage son (Noah Valentine) is steered into the right direction by a stranger (Pemberton).
43	6	"Wise Owl"	House/Animation	Louise Hooper	1 June 2022	N/A
Ronnie (Shearsmith) has spent his whole life trying to do the right thing, guided by memories of the animated 1970s public information film character Wise Owl (Ron Cook).

=== Series 8 (2022–23) ===
No. overall	No. in series	Title	Location	Directed by	Original release date	UK viewers (millions) 7 day	UK viewers (millions) 28 day
44	1	"The Bones of St Nicholas"	Church	George Kane	22 December 2022	2.3	2.7
Dr Parkway (Pemberton) has booked an overnight stay on Christmas Eve in a church that is supposedly haunted. He soon finds out he's not the only one there (Shearsmith, Shobna Gulati, Simon Callow), but why is he so keen to keep himself to himself?
45	2	"Mother's Ruin"	Bungalow	George Kane	27 April 2023	N/A	N/A
East End villains Harry and Annie Blackwood were rotten to the core and did some truly horrible things when they were alive. What secrets did they take to their grave? Their sons (Pemberton, Shearsmith) plan to find out, without disturbing the new owners of their parents' house (Phil Daniels, Anita Dobson).
46	3	"Paraskevidekatriaphobia"	Suburban house	George Kane	4 May 2023	N/A	N/A
Gareth (Shearsmith) is definitely going to be working from home today. Just to be on the safe side. In case anything unlucky happens. Because today just happens to be Friday the thirteenth.
47	4	"Love Is a Stranger"	Flat	Jesse Quinones	11 May 2023	N/A	N/A
Will Vicky (Claire Rushbrook) finally find love online or will she be talking to the Lonely Hearts Killer?
48	5	"3 by 3"	Television studio	Barbara Wiltshire	18 May 2023	N/A	N/A
Lee Mack hosts a new general knowledge quiz show where three teams of three compete to win a cash prize. However, all is not as it seems with competitors the Oakwood family (Saskia Wakefield, Gemma Page, James Tucker)... Initially advertised as decoy episode "Hold on Tight!", the episode does not feature Shearsmith or Pemberton and is not branded as Inside No. 9 until the closing credits. Filmed at dock10 studios in a virtual studio, the episode was shortlisted for two Broadcast Tech Awards: Best Innovation Project and Best Use Of Virtual Production/Studios.
49	6	"The Last Weekend"	Lakeside cabin	Ian Bevitt	25 May 2023	N/A	N/A
Joe (Pemberton) and Chas (Shearsmith) have been truly in love with each other for nine years. It's a long time, but how long do they need to say goodbye?

=== Series 9 (2024) ===
No. overall	No. in series	Title	Location	Directed by	Original release date	UK viewers (millions)
50	1	"Boo to a Goose"	Train carriage	George Kane	8 May 2024	WIP
Late-night passengers get stuck in a tunnel when their train breaks down. Patiently, they wait for the replacement service until a nurse (Philippa Dunne) gets her purse stolen and a teacher (Mark Bonnar) takes charge.
51	2	"The Trolley Problem"	Farmhouse	Al Campbell	15 May 2024	WIP
Therapist Blake (Pemberton) saves a man (Shearsmith) from leaping to his death from a bridge. The poor guy probably just needs someone to talk to. But is it a good idea to bring him back home? The episode is named after a thought experiment in ethics.
52	3	"Mulberry Close"	Suburban neighbourhood	Al Campbell	22 May 2024	WIP
There's a new couple at No 9. The residents of Mulberry Close are keen to welcome their new neighbours, but there's something about Damon (Shearsmith) and Val (Vinette Robinson) that doesn't seem quite right. This episode is filmed using a fixed doorbell camera.
53	4	"CTRL, ALT, ESC"	Escape room	George Kane	29 May 2024	WIP
Jason (Pemberton), Lynne (Katherine Kelly) and their two teenage daughters try out their local escape room, The Killer's Lair. It's not really the girls' idea of fun, but they love their dad, and he loves following the clues and solving the puzzles. Will they get out before they run out of time?
54	5	"The Curse of the Ninth"	Edwardian country house	Guillem Morales	5 June 2024	WIP
An Edwardian chiller, in which Jonah (Shearsmith), a talented piano-tuner, is forced to confront the power of a curse when he meets Lillian (Natalie Dormer), the owner of a large country house, and her housekeeper Devonshire (Hayley Squires).
55	6	"Plodding On"	Wrap party	George Kane	12 June 2024	WIP
At a party to celebrate the end of Inside No. 9, the friendship between Reece (Shearsmith) and Steve (Pemberton) is in danger, with Reece planning to continue their work together with a police comedy drama called Plodding On, while Steve is offered an acting job in America.

== Cast ==
As each episode of Inside No. 9 features new characters, the writers were able to attract actors who may have been unwilling or unable to commit to an entire series. The writers' reputation also helped attract actors, with journalist David Chater saying that they "have developed such a track record over the years that many of the finest actors in the country jump at the chance to appear in their dark imaginings". The fact that Pemberton and Shearsmith only played a single character in each story was a change for them; in The League of Gentlemen, the pair have played some 30 characters each, while, in Psychoville, they had played around five each. Though Pemberton and Shearsmith generally starred in each episode, they did not necessarily take on the main roles. Shearsmith explained this by saying that they "didn't write this for us to be in. We wrote the stories first then thought, could we be in them?" Pemberton and Shearsmith appear in all episodes, other than "3 by 3" in which neither appears, "The Harrowing" in which only Shearsmith appears, and "Last Gasp", featuring only Pemberton. More than 55 actors who previously appeared in former episodes returned for the Season 9 finale "Plodding On", portraying fictionalised versions of themselves. Following the airing of the final episode, Steve Pemberton auctioned his personal copy of the "Plodding On" script which had been signed by a majority of the key cast members across the 9 series. The only other actor to make multiple appearances across episodes as separate characters is Derek Jacobi who had a voice role in "The Devil of Christmas" before later returning in "How Do You Plead?"

Inside No. 9 guest stars
Series 1	Series 2	Series 3	Series 4	Halloween Special
1. "Sardines"; Katherine Parkinson; Tim Key; Luke Pasqualino; Ophelia Lovibond; Anne Reid; Julian Rhind-Tutt; Anna Chancellor; Marc Wootton; Ben Willbond; Timothy West; 2. "A Quiet Night In"; Denis Lawson; Oona Chaplin; Joyce Veheary; Kayvan Novak; 3. "Tom & Gerri"; Gemma Arterton; Conleth Hill; 4. "Last Gasp"; Lucy Hutchinson; Sophie Thompson; David Bedella; Tamsin Greig; Adam Deacon; 5. "The Understudy"; Lyndsey Marshal; Julia Davis; Rosie Cavaliero; Roger Sloman; Di Botcher; Richard Cordery; Bruce Mackinnon; Jo Stone-Fewings; 6. "The Harrowing"; Aimee-Ffion Edwards; Helen McCrory; Poppy Rush; Sean Buckley	1. "La Couchette"; Julie Hesmondhalgh; Mark Benton; Jessica Gunning; Jack Whitehall; George Glaves; 2. "The 12 Days of Christine"; Sheridan Smith; Tom Riley; Stacy Liu; Michele Dotrice; Jessica Ellerby; Paul Copley; Joel Little; Dexter Little; 3. "The Trial of Elizabeth Gadge"; David Warner; Ruth Sheen; Sinead Matthews; Jim Howick; Trevor Cooper; Paul Kaye; 4. "Cold Comfort"; Jane Horrocks; Nikki Amuka-Bird; Tony Way; Edward Easton; Vilma Hollingbery; Kath Hughes; James Meehan; Vicky Hall; 5. "Nana's Party"; Christopher Whitlow; Claire Skinner; Eve Gordon; Elsie Kelly; Lorraine Ashbourne; 6. "Seance Time"; Sophie McShera; Alison Steadman; Dan Starkey; Cariad Lloyd; Alice Lowe; Caden-Ellis Wall	1. "The Devil of Christmas"; Rula Lenska; Jessica Raine; George Bedford; Derek Jacobi; Cavan Clerkin; Naz Osmanoglu; 2. "The Bill"; Philip Glenister; Jason Watkins; Ellie White; Callum Coates; 3. "The Riddle of the Sphinx"; Alexandra Roach; 4. "Empty Orchestra"; Tamzin Outhwaite; Sarah Hadland; Javone Prince; Emily Howlett; Rebekah Hinds; 5. "Diddle Diddle Dumpling"; Keeley Hawes; Mathew Baynton; Danny Baker; Rosa Strudwick; 6. "Private View"; Fiona Shaw; Morgana Robinson; Felicity Kendal; Peter Kay; Montserrat Lombard; Johnny Flynn; Muriel Gray	1. "Zanzibar"; Jaygann Ayeh; Rory Kinnear; Bill Paterson; Marcia Warren; Hattie Morahan; Helen Monks; Tanya Franks; Kevin Eldon; 2. "Bernie Clifton's Dressing Room"; Sian Gibson; 3. "Once Removed"; Nick Moran; Monica Dolan; Emilia Fox; David Calder; Rufus Jones; 4. "To Have and To Hold"; Nicola Walker; Miranda Hennessy; Magdalena Kurek; Tom Mulheron; 5. "And the Winner Is..."; Kenneth Cranham; Fenella Woolgar; Zoe Wanamaker; Noel Clarke; Phoebe Sparrow; 6. "Tempting Fate"; Weruche Opia; Nigel Planer; Ruben Cryer	1. "Dead Line"; Stephanie Cole; Beccy Wright; Robin Berry; Yvonne D'Alpra; Emma Stannard; Rich Keeble; Chandrika Chevli; Sophie Jugé; Connie Wilkins
Series 5	Series 6	Series 7	Series 8	Series 9
1. "The Referee's a W***er"; David Morrissey; Steve Speirs; Ralf Little; Dipo Ola; Alistair Bruce-Ball; Mark Chapman; 2. "Death Be Not Proud"; Jenna Coleman; Kadiff Kirwan; Sarah Solemani; David Bamber; 3. "Love's Great Adventure"; Debbie Rush; Gaby French; Bobby Schofield; Olly Hudson-Croker; 4. "Misdirection"; Fionn Whitehead; Jill Halfpenny; Tom Goodman-Hill; 5. "Thinking Out Loud"; Maxine Peake; Phil Davis; Ioanna Kimbook; Sandra Gayer; Sara Kestelman; 6. "The Stakeout"; Rebecca Callard; Malik Ibheis	1. "Wuthering Heist"; Kevin Bishop; Gemma Whelan; Paterson Joseph; Rosa Robson; Dino Kelly; 2. "Simon Says"; Nick Mohammed; Lindsay Duncan; 3. "Lip Service"; Sian Clifford; Charles Armstrong; 4. "Hurry Up and Wait"; Pauline McLynn; Donna Preston; Bhavna Limbachia; Adrian Dunbar; 5. "How Do You Plead?"; Derek Jacobi; Aaron Neil; Stanley Lane; 6. "Last Night of the Proms"; Debra Gillett; Bamshad Abedi-Amin; Sarah Parish; Julian Glover; Jack Wolfe	1. "Merrily, Merrily"; Mark Gatiss; Diane Morgan; Patrice Naiambana; 2. "Mr King"; Annette Badland; Elin Owen; Rosie Ekenna; William Newton; Charlie Baron; Isaac Eames; Darcy Olivia-White; Summer Rose; Toby Roberts; 3. "Nine Lives Kat"; Sophie Okonedo; Robin Weaver; Siobhan Redmond; Coco-Lili Hoder; 4. "Kid/Nap"; Danny Mays; Jason Isaacs; Daisy Haggard; 5. "A Random Act of Kindness"; Jessica Hynes; Noah Valentine; 6. "Wise Owl"; Georgie Glen; Ron Cook; Dylan Hall; Isabelle Lee Pratt	1. "The Bones of St. Nicholas"; Simon Callow; Shobna Gulati; 2. "Mother's Ruin"; Anita Dobson; Phil Daniels; 3. "Paraskevidekatriaphobia"; Amanda Abbington; Samantha Spiro; Leon Herbert; Ayda Kiiza; Moyo Akandé; Dermot O'Leary; 4. "Love Is a Stranger"; Claire Rushbrook; Asim Chaudhry; Frances Barber; Mathew Horne; Menyee Lai; 5. "3 by 3"; Lee Mack; Saskia Wakefield; Gemma Page; James Tucker; Ronay Poole; James Bailey; Tiajna Amayo; Mary Keegan; Jim Rastall; Kiran L Dadlani; 6. "The Last Weekend"; Sheila Reid	1. "Boo to a Goose"; Siobhan Finneran; Mark Bonnar; Charlie Cooper; Philippa Dunne; Joel Fry; Matthew Kelly; Susan Wokoma; Dan March; Melissa Woodbridge; 2. "The Trolley Problem"; Ethan Joseph-Robert; Eleanor Kirby; 3. "Mulberry Close"; Dorothy Atkinson; Vinette Robinson; Adrian Scarborough; Tyler Cameron; Stephanie Booty; Michael Ball; 4. "CTRL, ALT, ESC"; Maddie Evans; Katherine Kelly; Kalli Tant; Angus Wright; 5. "The Curse of the Ninth"; Natalie Dormer; Eddie Marsan; Hayley Squires; James Swanton; 6. "Plodding On"; Robin Askwith; And returning guest stars: Katherine Parkinson; Tim Key; Amanda Abbington; Anne Reid; Rosie Cavaliero; Nick Mohammed; Sian Gibson; Jason Watkins; Emily Howlett; Mark Gatiss

== Distribution ==
The first series of Inside No. 9 was shown in the UK on BBC Two (and BBC Two HD) between 5 February and 12 March 2014. It was aired in Australia on BBC First, premiering on 5 January 2015. The second series aired in the UK from 26 March to 29 April 2015, and aired in Australia from 27 July 2015.

The first series was released on DVD on 17 March 2014. In addition to the six episodes, the DVD featured the making of feature "Inside Inside No. 9", including unseen interviews with Pemberton, Shearsmith and Kerr, and a photo gallery with previously unreleased photos. Published by 2 Entertain, the DVD was rated 18 by the British Board of Film Classification. To publicise the DVD, the writers appeared at the Oxford Street, London, branch of HMV for a signing event on 20 March.

The DVD was reviewed for webzine PopMatters by David Upton, who gave the main feature an 8/10 rating, and the extras a 5/10 rating, and Ben Walsh for The Independent, who gave the DVD overall 4/5. Phelim O'Neill, reviewing the release for The Guardian, described the boxset as "very lendable", suggesting that it would help Inside No. 9 reach a wider audience.

South African newspapers The Sunday Times and The Star both published positive reviews of the DVD, with The Star's anonymous review saying the DVD "makes a great prezzie for cynics, so if you know any lawyers or journalists...". The second series was released on DVD on 4 May 2015. A review in the Leicester Mercury awarded it four out of five stars. A collection of all nine series of the show was released on 24 June 2024 as a DVD boxset.

The scripts of the first three series were released by Hodder & Stoughton in 2020, with scripts of the following three series released in 2022. A book detailing the production history of Series 1 to 5, The Insider's Guide To Inside No. 9 by Mark Salisbury, was released in 2021.

== Reception and performance ==
=== Critical reception ===
Many critics responded very positively to Inside No. 9. The overall series has a 100% score at Rotten Tomatoes. Commentators have described it as "never less-than-captivating" and "consistently compelling", offering particularly strong praise for "The 12 Days of Christine", "The Riddle of the Sphinx" and "Dead Line". Inside No. 9 won the Sketch and Comedy prize at the 35th annual Banff World Media Festival Rockie Awards, and won the comedy prize at the 2016 Rose d'Or ceremony. It was nominated for the Best TV Sitcom prize at the 2014 Freesat Awards, the Broadcast Award for Best Original Programme, and at the 2014 British Comedy Awards for both the Best New Comedy Programme and the Best Comedy Drama. In the Comedy.co.uk Awards it was voted "Best TV Comedy Drama" in 2014, 2015, 2016, and 2017, and was named "Comedy of the Year" in 2017 and 2018. The series has received three nominations at the British Academy Television Awards. In 2019, Pemberton won Best Male Comedy Performance. In 2021, Shearsmith was nominated for the same award and the show won Best Scripted Comedy.

After the final episode of the first series, the comedic critic Bruce Dessau said on his website that it had "really set an early benchmark to beat for comedy of the year. It has been consistently compelling as each week we entered an entirely different world." On the same day, David Chater, writing in The Times, said of the series as a whole that "[i]t's hard to know which to admire more – the rich and perverse imaginations of Steve Pemberton and Reece Shearsmith or the extraordinary range of acting talent that has brought this strange and memorable series to life." Chater had previously described "A Quiet Night In", the second episode of Inside No. 9, as "the funniest, cleverest, most imaginative and original television I have seen for as long as I can remember – one of those fabulous programmes where time stands still and the world around you disappears". Mark Jones (The Guardian) considered the whole series, saying that the Inside No. 9 was "never less-than-captivating", while a review in the Liverpool Echo described every episode as "intriguing and lovingly-crafted", though it was felt that the first three episodes were stronger than the latter three. In December 2014, Metro television critic Keith Watson named Inside No. 9 the twentieth best television programme of 2014, and in January 2015, Daily Star Sunday columnist Garry Bushell named Inside No. 9 the best comedy TV programme of 2014.

Writing before Inside No. 9 was televised, broadcaster and journalist Mark Lawson suggested that, among anthology series, the programme possessed "the potential to be remembered as a singular achievement". Commending both the acting and writing of Inside No. 9, New Statesman television critic Rachel Cooke offered a positive verdict of the programme after seeing the first half of the series. Cooke expressed particular admiration of Pemberton and Shearsmith's ability to squeeze "perfectly formed narratives – characters with proper backstories, scenarios that are complicated and unwind relatively slowly – into just 30 minutes". Also writing mid-series, journalist Gareth Lightfoot called Inside No. 9 "hands down the best, freshest thing on [television] at the moment" in the Evening Gazette, though he doubted whether it could truly be considered comedy.

Donal Lynch, of Irish newspaper the Sunday Independent, suggested that, like the previous work of Pemberton and Shearsmith, Inside No. 9 may be something of "a cult hit/acquired taste". Barry Didcock, of The Herald, expressed a similar sentiment, calling Inside No. 9 "probably the most Marmitey programme on television". The Times published a response to a complaint received from a viewer, who was unhappy with Chater's positive reviews of Inside No. 9, suggesting that "A Quiet Night In" was more traumatic than humorous. Sam Wollaston, television critic for The Guardian, noted that humour is extremely personal, and though he could appreciate much about Inside No. 9, he had never liked Pemberton and Shearsmith's work: "I'm sure I'll be crucified – probably quite rightly – but I don't love Inside No 9." Some tabloid columnists also expressed dissatisfaction with the programme. Virginia Blackburn, of the Daily Express, wrote a highly critical review of "Last Gasp". Blackburn considered Inside No. 9 an example of the weakness of contemporary television comedy, saying that the episode is "not funny, it's not clever and is so utterly, irredeemably, naffly silly that it ends up being incredibly irritating and nothing else". Another journalist unimpressed was the Daily Mirror columnist Kevin O'Sullivan, who dismissed the programme by saying simply "BBC2's alleged comedy Inside No. 9: didn't even smile".

Cooke observed the difficulty in reviewing Inside No. 9 as a whole due to the fact that each episode is different from the last. "Sardines" was commended for its cast and acting, as well as the scripting, but critics had a mixed response to the twist ending. "A Quiet Night In" was a change in approach, relying on physical comedy, but it was well received as funny, and inventive. "Tom & Gerri" was less comedic but darker than previous episodes; critics commended the plot, but disagreed about the portrayal of mental illness in the episode. Less horrific than other episodes in the series, "Last Gasp" dealt with themes of celebrity culture and fandom, and was considered a weaker instalment. Critics called "The Understudy" a "return to form". While it was based upon Macbeth, a knowledge of the play was not necessary for enjoyment, and the plot's divergence from the play was praised. "The Harrowing" was the most horrific episode of the series, and was considered genuinely scary by critics.

"La Couchette" was characterised by critics as strong and funny, with praise directed at the cast and script. "The 12 Days of Christine" was hailed as "masterpiece" and "a quiet elegy, terse and polished, in many ways perfect". The emotional script, poignancy of the ending and performance of the cast, especially Smith, was highly praised. "The Trial of Elizabeth Gadge" was compared unfavourably with the previous two episodes by some critics, though the writers were characterised as having displayed their versatility and ability with the atypical setting and language. Critics had a mixed response to the episode's humour, but praised the performance of the cast. "Cold Comfort" was generally praised, though also characterised as weaker than other episodes in the series. The unusual filming style was commended, but there was a mixed response to the episode's ending. "Nana's Party" received high praise for its script and characters, and for the cast's performances. "Séance Time" was praised as well written and genuinely frightening, while Alison Steadman's performance being picked out for commendation by many critics.

In a 2018 article for Salon, American writer Mary Elizabeth Williams described the series as "the best show you're not watching" and "brilliant, black-humored, taut format horror for people who enjoy the occasional potty-joke". In 2019, Inside No. 9 was ranked 66th on The Guardian's list of the 100 best TV shows of the 21st century.

Reviewing the first episode of the 2024 final series for The Guardian, Rachel Aroesti said, "Unlike other episodes, which are often littered with handbrake turns, this time we end up sitting tight for the big reveal. And it's completely unguessable – that violent shift in perspective executed with aplomb."

The broadcast of the last ever episode, on 12 June 2024, was anticipated in several media reports.

=== Viewing figures ===
Despite the generally positive reception among critics and viewers, the viewing figures for the first series were poor. The average viewing figures for the series were 904,000 people, or 4.9% of the audience, lower than the slot average of 970,000 (5.1% of the audience). The series had a strong start, with 1.1 million viewers, which was 5.6% of the audience, watching "Sardines". The series low was the fifth episode, "The Understudy", which attracted 720,000 viewers (4.1% of the audience). The highest ratings were achieved by The Bones of St. Nicholas with 2.7 million viewers watching within 28 days of broadcast.

In total, the first eight series of the show have been collectively viewed more than 100 million times, according to the BBC in June 2024. The ninth series of the show launched with 531,000 viewers, which comparatively was an increase from the eighth series, though slightly lower than the seventh series' opener.

=== Awards and nominations ===
Inside No. 9 won the Sketch and Comedy prize at the 35th annual Banff World Media Festival Rockie Awards. The other nominees were Do I Have to Take Care of Everything?, It's a Date, Tiny Plastic Men, Gangsta Granny and The Revolution Will Be Televised. In response to the nomination, Shearsmith tweeted that he was "[t]hrilled", joking that the programme was "in 'Comedy'. I knew it was one".

Inside No. 9 was also nominated for Best TV Sitcom at the 2014 Freesat Awards, which celebrate the best of free British television. The programme lost to BBC2's The Wrong Mans, as determined by a panel made up of television experts and commentators. In November 2014, it was announced that Inside No. 9 had been shortlisted for the 2015 Broadcast Award for Best Original Programme.

At the award ceremony in London on 4 February 2015, Glasgow Girls was granted the award, but Inside No. 9 was highly commended. Inside No. 9 won the TV award at the 2015 Chortle Awards. The programme was longlisted for the Best Comedy prize in the 2015 TV Choice Awards. The programme won the 2016 comedy Rose d'Or, beating the Finnish Pyjama Party and the German Crime Scene Cleaner (Der Tatortreiniger).

At the 2014 British Comedy Awards, Inside No. 9 was nominated in the Best New Comedy Programme and the Best Comedy Drama categories. In the former category, it lost to Toast of London, in the latter category, it lost to Rev. For Chater (The Times), the comedy drama category was the strongest of the awards, but for Ben Williams (Time Out), Inside No. 9 should have won. Writing in The Independent, journalist Alice Jones said she was "sorry to see the relentlessly innovative Inside No 9 go unrewarded".

Year	Award	Category	Nominee(s)	Result	Ref
2014	Royal Television Society Craft and Design Awards	Make Up Design – Drama	Lisa Cavalli-Green	Nominated	
2014	British Comedy Guide	Best TV Comedy Drama	Inside No. 9	Won	
2014	British Comedy Awards	Best New Comedy	Inside No. 9	Nominated	
2014	British Comedy Awards	Best Comedy Drama	Inside No. 9	Nominated	
2014	Banff World Media Festival	Best in Sketch and Comedy	Inside No. 9	Won	
2015	RTS Programme Awards	Best Comedy Performance	Reece Shearsmith & Steve Pemberton	Won	
2015	British Academy Television Craft Awards	Best Writing	Inside No. 9	Nominated	
2015	British Comedy Guide	Best TV Comedy Drama	Inside No. 9	Won	
2016	Rose d'Or	Best Comedy	Inside No. 9	Won	
2016	British Comedy Guide	Best TV Comedy Drama	Inside No. 9	Won	
2016	British Academy Television Craft Awards	Breakthrough Talent	Guillem Morales	Nominated	
2017	British Comedy Guide	Best TV Comedy Drama	Inside No. 9	Won	
2017	British Comedy Guide	Comedy of the Year	Inside No. 9	Won	
2018	British Academy Television Craft Awards	Writer - Comedy	Steve Pemberton & Reece Shearsmith	Won	
2018	British Comedy Guide	Best TV Comedy Drama	Inside No. 9	Won	
2018	British Comedy Guide	Comedy of the Year	Inside No. 9	Won	
2018	Writers' Guild of Great Britain	Best TV Situation Comedy	Steve Pemberton & Reece Shearsmith	Won	
2019	Chortle Awards	TV Award	Inside No. 9	Won	
2019	British Academy Television Awards	Best Male Comedy Performance	Steve Pemberton	Won	
2019	British Academy Television Craft Awards	Best Director: Multi-Camera	Barbara Wiltshare	Won	
2020	British Comedy Guide	Best TV Comedy Drama	Inside No. 9	Won	
2021	British Academy Television Awards	Best Male Comedy Performance	Reece Shearsmith	Nominated	
2021	British Academy Television Awards	Best Scripted Comedy	Inside No. 9	Won	

== Stage productions ==
=== China immersive stage production (2023–25) ===
Following the TV series' popularity in China, an immersive stage adaptation of Inside No. 9 premiered in December 2023 at the Shanghai Grand Theatre and ran until February 2024. The episodes performed were "Once Removed", "Séance Time" and "La Couchette" in separate spaces. In December 2024, the production opened in Beijing for a limited run.

=== Stage/Fright (2025) ===
On 3 May 2024, it was announced that Pemberton and Shearsmith would write and star in a stage adaptation of the series, called Inside No. 9 Stage/Fright, which opened at the Wyndham's Theatre in London's West End from 18 January 2025 for a limited run until 5 April, directed by Simon Evans. Each performance featured a celebrity guest star, which included Lee Mack, Ian McKellen, David Tennant and Bob Mortimer. The show toured the UK during autumn 2025, before returning to London for a final run at the Hammersmith Apollo from 2 to 6 January 2026.
