= Bernie Clifton's Dressing Room =

- Inside No. 9 episode
- Tommy (Reece Shearsmith, left) and Len (Steve Pemberton, right). Poster designed by Andy Bottomley.
- Episode no.: Series 4 Episode 2
- Directed by: Graeme Harper
- Written by: Steve Pemberton; Reece Shearsmith
- Original air date: 9 January 2018
- Running time: 30 minutes

Guest appearance
- Sian Gibson as Leanne

Episode chronology
← Previous "Zanzibar"	Next → "Once Removed"

"Bernie Clifton's Dressing Room" is the second episode of the fourth series of the British black comedy anthology television programme Inside No. 9. Written by Steve Pemberton and Reece Shearsmith, the episode was directed by Graeme Harper and was first shown on 9 January 2018, on BBC Two. It stars Pemberton, Shearsmith and Sian Gibson. The episode won Pemberton the BAFTA Award for best male performance in a comedy programme. The episode was also performed as part of the 2025 stage show Stage/Fright.

== Plot ==
Tommy (Reece Shearsmith) and Len (Steve Pemberton), a comedy duo called "Cheese and Crackers" who split up 30 years ago, decide to meet up again in a church hall. They have decided to get together for another round of skits, and practise one of their old skits to warm up. Tommy questions the skit's viability to be performed due to its reliance on outdated racial stereotypes, and is reluctant to continue performing skits; Len tries to convince Tommy of all the fun they had performing together.

Tommy and Len discuss the past for some time, and Tommy brings up that Len owes him £25 for "Bernie Clifton's dressing room". An awkward silence ensues. The two continue discussing the past and rehearsing old sketches, and Tommy continues complaining about how dated their skits are, while Len wishes to stick to their original material. Len leaves to have a smoke break, and Tommy discovers that Len is homeless. They continue to argue over the skits' content.

The two decide to rehearse their "Brown Bottles" skit, involving Len drinking seven bottles of beer. Afterwards, Tommy reveals that during a performance of "Brown Bottles", Len left the stage, and Tommy found him "choking in his own vomit" in "Bernie Clifton's dressing room". Tommy had to pay Clifton £25 for the incident. Len was an alcoholic, and Tommy, despite his love for the show business, split up with him for fear of Len drinking himself to death.

Len's daughter, Leanne (Sian Gibson), enters the hall, and Len is suddenly missing from the hall. Leanne hands Tommy the order of service for Len's funeral, and an envelope from Len. Within it is a flyer for "Cheese and Crackers", £25, and a letter reading "For Bernie Clifton's dressing room. Sorry I messed up x". Tommy and "Len" do one last performance together, singing that "If you're going to cry, cry tears of laughter", and Tommy heads to the funeral to give his speech.
