= Dead Line (Inside No. 9) =

- Inside No. 9 episode
- Poster designed by Andy Bottomley
- Directed by: Barbara Wiltshire
- Written by: Steve Pemberton; Reece Shearsmith
- Original air date: 28 October 2018
- Running time: 32 minutes

Guest appearance
- Stephanie Cole as Moira O'Keefe

Episode chronology
← Previous "Tempting Fate"	Next → "The Referee's a W***er"

"Dead Line" is a Halloween special episode of the British black comedy anthology television programme Inside No. 9. Written by Steve Pemberton and Reece Shearsmith, it was directed by Barbara Wiltshire and was first broadcast live on 28 October 2018, on BBC Two. It stars Pemberton, Shearsmith and Stephanie Cole. It is a live broadcast, and it pretended to experience technical difficulties while it was filming.

The plot is centered around Granada Studios, infamous for its many disasters and its supposedly being haunted. During the broadcast, the episode was presented as being filmed at Granada; it was actually being filmed at The Maidstone Studios.

== Plot ==
Arthur Flitwick, played by Steve Pemberton, returns home with a phone he has found and wishes to return it to its owner. He calls the last number dialled, Moira O'Keefe, played by Stephanie Cole. She says it belongs to Elsie Mitchelle, and advises Arthur to contact the local vicar, Reverend Neil, played by Reece Shearsmith. That evening, Neil enters the house, enquires how Arthur found the phone, and attempts to collect it. Arthur says he prefers to keep the phone and return it to Elsie; Neil leaves.

Technical issues arise, and the characters are inaudible. An announcer apologizes for the issues with the sound, resuming the broadcast after the announcement. However, the issues are unfixable, and "A Quiet Night In" is rerun to replace the timeslot. During the rerun, a ghost appears outside the window of the house from the episode. The ghost bangs on the glass and the feed glitches before cutting back to the now empty set of Dead Line. The announcer apologises once again for the technical difficulties, but is repeatedly cut off by intermittent whispering. She asks, "is someone there?", after which a loud beep is heard, followed by the announcer screaming.

The episode cuts to live CCTV footage of the set. It then suddenly cuts to genuine footage from an episode of Public Enemy Number One (1992), which sees Bobby Davro put in stocks. The prop malfunctions, causing the stocks to fall, and Davro's face was smashed into the floor, which nearly killed him. This was edited out of the episode, but was included on BBC safety training videos, which is where the footage originates.

The episode cuts back to live CCTV footage of the makeup room. Pemberton and Shearsmith complain about the technical issues, and the concept of the episode being live in general.

A clip from an episode of Most Haunted is suddenly broadcast, discussing the hauntings that occurred within Granada Studios, where "Dead Line" is being filmed. It then cuts back to studio footage of the phone from the set ringing. Cole answers it and talks with an unseen individual named Alan. Meanwhile, Pemberton and Shearsmith learn they are being broadcast on BBC Two while reading about various historical disasters that occurred in Granada Studios, including Davro's prop malfunction and the death of a man named Alan Starr by hanging.

The feed cuts to rehearsal footage. Arthur is covered in blood in his bathroom, holding a knife, as Moira helps herself into his apartment after she received a message from Neil. Arthur hastily dresses up, and denies that he ever met with Neil. Moira discovers Neil's head inside the microwave. Arthur claims that Elsie's ghost contacted him through her phone, and that Neil murdered Elsie for money from her will. Breaking character, Cole asks Pemberton and Shearsmith about the characters' motives. A ghostly figure is visible behind them, and starts slowly walking towards the camera.

Cutting back to live footage of the set, Shearsmith comes to talk with Cole. She seems to be possessed and says that Alan told her that the studio belongs to the ghosts, and that they are trespassing, advising Shearsmith to leave. Indifferent, he goes to make a cup of tea, and Cole kills herself by slicing her neck. CCTV footage from elsewhere in the studio shows a water bucket falling over by itself near an electric gate, and television screens shutting off. The Most Haunted episode is then played, where they discuss that just opposite Granada Studios, a Victorian church called the Church of St. John's has a graveyard with 22,000 bodies, some of which likely were under where Granada Studios is built.

The broadcast cuts to Shearsmith's bodycam, making tea. He hears banging and investigates. It turns out to be Pemberton, who scares Shearsmith with the prop of Neil's head and a mask. Pemberton touches the electric gate with the water spill, and he is paralyzed and electrocuted.

The episode cuts to a news report about Alan Starr's hanging at Granada Studios, after experiencing schizophrenic episodes and paranormal incidents. He recorded voices of a spirit saying "let us be". The episode then cuts to an actual news report of a fire at Granada Studios. It caused costumes, sets, and props stored in Granada, which were meant for The Jewel in the Crown (1984), to be all destroyed.

The episode cuts back to Shearsmith, running to find help, discovering Cole's corpse. The studio is now abandoned, and the lights go out. He is then jumped at by the spirit of Alan Starr, and falls to his death. Granada's other spirits look down at Shearsmith.

An interview on The One Show with Shearsmith and Pemberton that aired before the special is played, where Shearsmith denied the existence of ghosts. A scene from "A Quiet Night In", where Shearsmith and Pemberton's characters get shot, is repeated at increasing speed. The episode cuts to black, and a whisper is heard: "Let us be". The technical difficulties music is heard, distorted and slowing down.

== Reception ==
The episode was critically praised in the Telegraph and in the Guardian, which said it showed that "in the right hands, TV still has the capacity to surprise, disconcert and delight".
