= Tempting Fate (Inside No. 9) =

- Inside No. 9 episode
- Poster designed by Graham Humphreys
- Episode no.: Series 4 Episode 6
- Directed by: Jim O'Hanlon
- Written by: Steve Pemberton; Reece Shearsmith
- Original air date: 6 February 2018
- Running time: 30 minutes

Guest appearances
- Weruche Opia as Maz; Nigel Planer as Frank; Ruben Cryer as Charlie

Episode chronology
← Previous "And the Winner Is..."	Next → "Dead Line"

"Tempting Fate" is the sixth and final episode of series four of the British black comedy anthology television programme Inside No. 9. Written by Steve Pemberton and Reece Shearsmith, the episode was directed by Jim O'Hanlon and was first shown on 6 February 2018, on BBC Two. It stars Pemberton, Shearsmith, Weruche Opia, Nigel Planer and Ruben Cryer.
