= Once Removed (Inside No. 9) =

- Inside No. 9 episode
- Poster designed by Billy Odell
- Episode no.: Series 4 Episode 3
- Directed by: Jim O' Hanlon
- Written by: Steve Pemberton; Reece Shearsmith
- Original air date: 16 January 2018
- Running time: 29 minutes

Guest appearances
- Monica Dolan as May; Nick Moran as Spike; David Calder as Percy; Emilia Fox as Natasha; Rufus Jones as Charles (voice)

Episode chronology
← Previous "Bernie Clifton's Dressing Room"	Next → "To Have and to Hold"

"Once Removed" is the third episode of series four of the British black comedy anthology television programme Inside No. 9. Written by Steve Pemberton and Reece Shearsmith, the episode was directed by Jim O'Hanlon and was first shown on 16 January 2018, on BBC Two. It stars Pemberton, Shearsmith, Monica Dolan, Nick Moran, David Calder and Emilia Fox (with the voice of Rufus Jones).
