= David Kerr (director) =

British television director

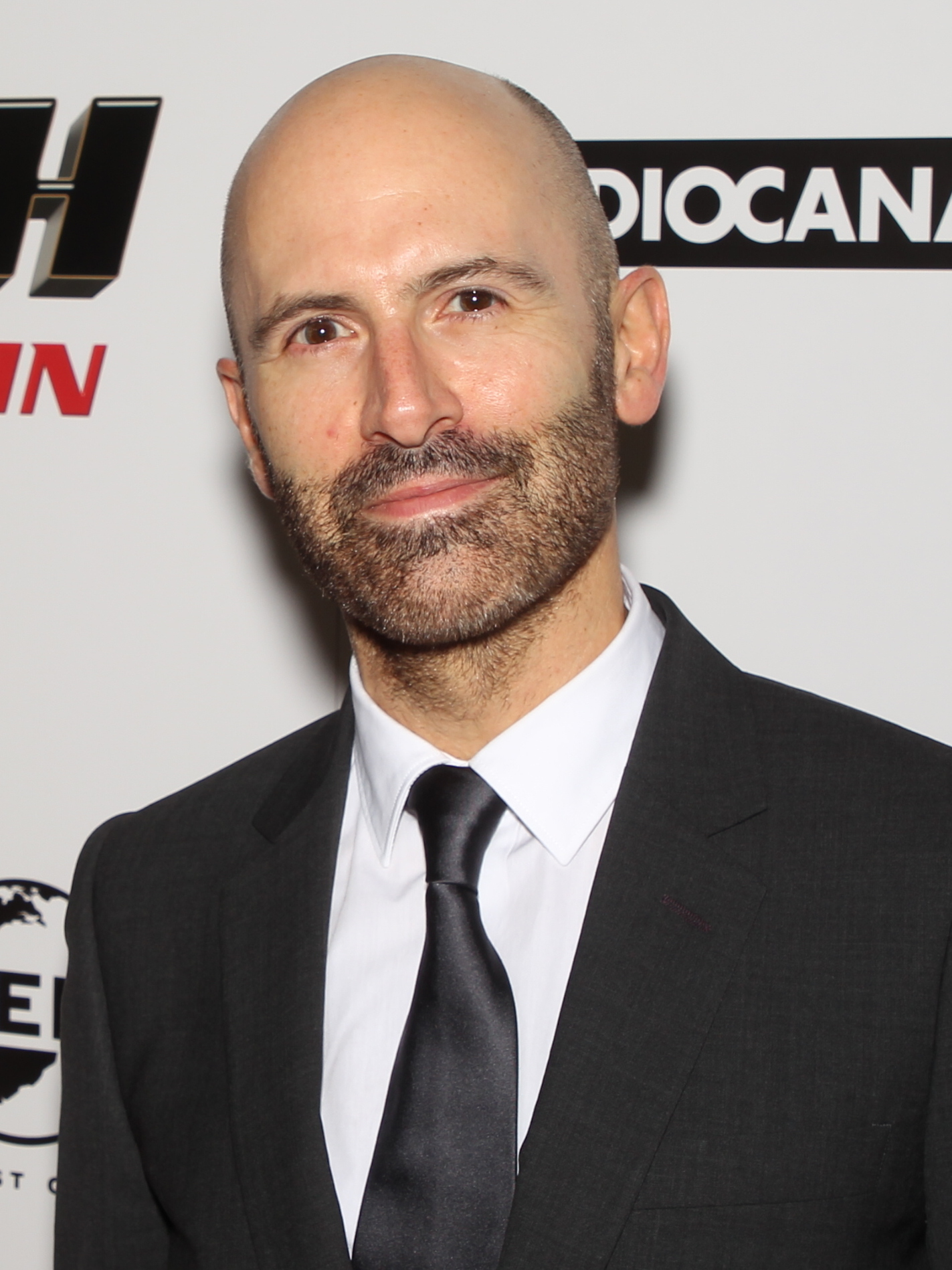
- Kerr attending the US premiere of Johnny English Strikes Again in October 2018
- Born: Belfast, Northern Ireland
- Education: Cambridge University
- Occupation: Director

David Kerr is a British film and television director. His debut feature film, Johnny English Strikes Again, was released by Universal Pictures in 2018. David has a long track record as a pilot/lead director of award-winning TV comedy and drama, which includes No Offence, Inside No.9, Fresh Meat, Beautiful People and Whites.

== Early life ==
Kerr studied at Clare College, Cambridge and graduated (1989) with a First Class degree in Classics.

== Career ==
He directs commercials through Hungry Man Productions. In 2015, his US gun control spot, "Playthings", won Best PSA at The AICP Show in New York.

David was presented with a British Academy Television Award for directing the first series of That Mitchell and Webb Look in 2006. He was nominated for another BAFTA for the second series in 2008.

In August 2017, he directed the spy comedy film Johnny English Strikes Again, which was released in 2018.

In November 2023, it was announced by Paramount+ that Kerr would be lead director for a new original drama series Stags, filming on location in Tenerife and due to be released in 2024.
