= Diddle Diddle Dumpling (Inside No. 9) =

- Inside No. 9 episode
- Reece Shearsmith as David, Keeley Hawes as Louise, and Rosa Strudwick as Sally in a publicity photograph for "Diddle Diddle Dumpling"
- Episode no.: Series 3 Episode 5
- Directed by: Guillem Morales
- Written by: Steve Pemberton; Reece Shearsmith
- Editing by: Joe Randall-Cutler
- Original air date: 14 March 2017

Guest appearances
- Keeley Hawes as Louise; Rosa Strudwick as Sally; Danny Baker as a DJ; Mathew Baynton as Ted

Episode chronology
← Previous "Empty Orchestra"	Next → "Private View"

"Diddle Diddle Dumpling" is the fifth episode of the third series of the British black comedy anthology television series Inside No. 9. It was written by Steve Pemberton and Reece Shearsmith, and first aired on 14 March 2017, on BBC Two. The episode, which was directed by Guillem Morales, follows the story of David, played by Shearsmith, a middle class stay-at-home dad, who happens across a lone black shoe. Much to the concern of his wife Louise, played by Keeley Hawes, he becomes obsessed with finding the shoe's owner. The episode follows the development of his obsession. Rosa Strudwick plays Sally, David and Louise's daughter, and Pemberton plays Chris, a family friend. Danny Baker voices a radio presenter, and Mathew Baynton also appears.

The episode was inspired by Pemberton's own chance encounter with a single shoe. The episode is split into four, corresponding to the four seasons, and features extracts of Vivaldi's The Four Seasons. The cinematography features many views of symmetrical pairs of objects, as well as shots of empty rooms. The device of the seasons, as well as the music and cinematography, relate to David's emotional state. Critics responded very positively to "Diddle Diddle Dumpling", particularly praising Morales's direction and the performances of Shearsmith, Hawes, and Baynton.

== Production ==
The third series of Inside No. 9 was announced in October 2015, and heavily publicised in January 2016, at which time Keeley Hawes and Mathew Baynton were named as guest stars in the series. "Diddle Diddle Dumpling" was the fifth and penultimate episode of the series, and the fourth of a run of five episodes beginning February 2017—the series's first episode being the December 2016 Christmas special "The Devil of Christmas". It first aired on 14 March 2017, on BBC Two.

"Diddle Diddle Dumpling" was inspired by a chance encounter that Pemberton had with a single shoe on his way to work, leading him to consider the result of someone obsessively attempting to return it to its rightful owner. He claimed that the episode's premise then came to him "fully formed". He took Shearsmith to see the shoe, and the pair began writing the episode immediately. Coincidentally, Shearsmith also encountered a single shoe some days later, though it did not match the first. "You start seeing them everywhere," Shearsmith noted, "once you start looking." For Pemberton, this inspiration worked because it was completely random; were he to have gone out looking for inspiration, he claimed, it would not have worked. The episode is split into four, corresponding to the four seasons, and features music from Vivaldi's The Four Seasons. It takes its name from the nursery rhyme "Diddle, Diddle, Dumpling, My Son John".

"Diddle Diddle Dumpling" starred Shearsmith as David, Hawes as David's wife Louise, Rosa Strudwick as the couple's daughter Sally, and Pemberton as Chris, a family friend. Danny Baker voiced a radio presenter, and Baynton appeared as Ted. When contacted about appearing in Inside No. 9, Hawes was starring in The Durrells. However, as "Diddle Diddle Dumpling" would take only a week to film, she was able to move straight from The Durrells to Inside No. 9. Her respective characters, despite having close names, were very different. According to Pemberton, Hawes had hoped to dislike the script so that she could turn down the role. When she read it, however, she could not resist.

"Diddle Diddle Dumpling" was the Inside No. 9 producer Adam Tandy's favourite episode of the series, while Pemberton considered it one of the best. Shearsmith identified David as one of his favourite characters from the series, and said that he fondly remembered working with Hawes, whom he praised as a performer. Hawes commended Inside No. 9, the episode's script, and Morales's direction, expressing how much she had enjoyed working with Pemberton and Shearsmith, as well as the amount she had laughed during the filming process.

== Plot ==
External videos
- "Angelina"; David (Shearsmith) is confronted by Louise (Hawes) about his attempts to find a lost shoe's owner

Spring

David, a middle class stay-at-home dad, lives with his wife Louise and daughter Sally. While out jogging, he encounters a single slip-on dress shoe. David keeps an eye on the shoe, and, by the time Louise arrives home that evening, has moved it to the dinner table. Louise drops it on the floor, though David's attention remains on it. Later, in daytime, David chastises Sally for playing with the shoe, and Louise is angry that he has hung posters advertising his find that feature their phone number.

Summer

The family celebrate Sally's birthday, while the shoe sits under a sofa. Later, Chris, a family friend, visits. He may have a job for David, but, to Louise's horror, David begins talking about his "project". Louise has binned the shoe; David is mortified, and Louise challenges him to not speak about the shoe for two minutes. He fails, and storms out to search the bin. Louise and Chris share a tender moment, but David does not notice; he is more concerned with how Chris could help him publicise his search for the shoe's owner. David's multimedia campaign and reward offer, initially unsuccessful, ultimately result in a visit from a young man who has a matching shoe. David interrogates him at length. Once satisfied by his account, and having spent a final few moments alone with the newly matched pair, he reluctantly hands it over, holding back tears.

Autumn

Sally and Louise are happy in the kitchen, when David, smartly dressed and with a confident manner, returns from work. Despite Louise's reservations, Sally performs a piece she will present in her school assembly, involving the nursery rhyme "Diddle, Diddle, Dumpling":

Diddle, diddle, dumpling, my son John,
Went to bed with his trousers on!
One shoe off, and one shoe on,
Diddle, diddle, dumpling, my son John!

Despite a pained expression, David applauds, hugging his daughter.

Winter

Louise encounters the shoe outside her house. Inside, David confronts her about a photograph he has found—Louise's college friend, Ted, is the man to whom David gave the shoe. He has also found a receipt for a new set of shoes, bought by Louise shortly before Ted's visit. David accuses Louise of giving him false hope, and, in response to her exasperation, says that it was never about the shoe. David is in grief, having never recovered from the death of Sally's twin brother, Joseph, six years earlier. Like the shoes, the children were "Two halves ... and one of them's gone", though he believes that "they should be together". Louise finds blood on David's hands, but it is not his own. He had driven to Norfolk to retrieve the shoe from Ted, but does not remember what he has done. The emergency services arrive outside.

On a cabinet is a photograph of a smiling David holding two infants. He is wearing the shoes. Over the credits, security footage from 15 March 2016 shows David placing the shoe outside his house before jogging away.

== Analysis ==
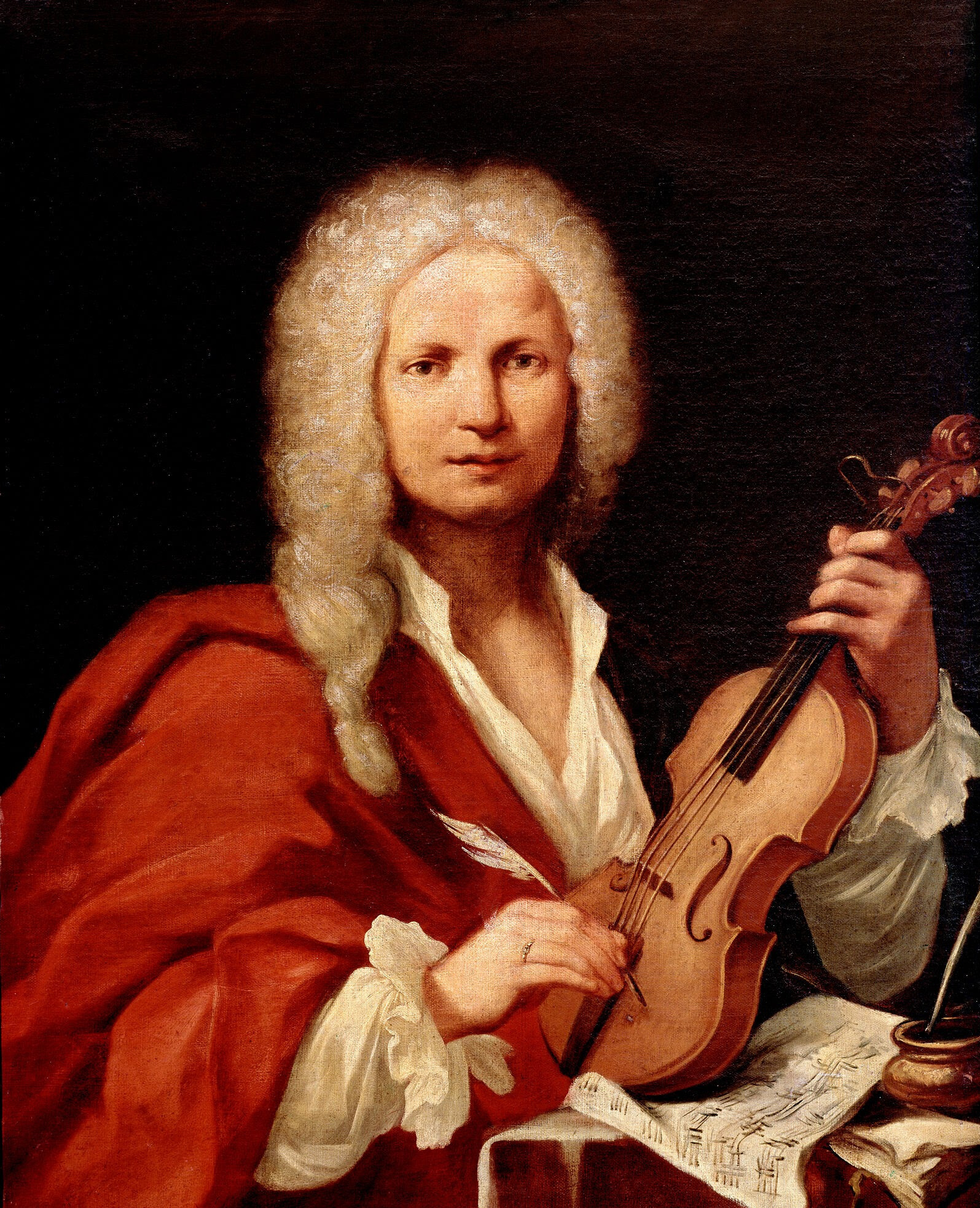
The episode uses The Four Seasons, by Vivaldi (pictured) to mark changing seasons and David's changing mental state.

"Diddle Diddle Dumpling", with David's obsessive search for the shoe's owner, offered a "macabre reimagining" of Cinderella for Sean O'Grady of The Independent. The journalist Andrew Billen, on the other hand, said that the episode did not present the shoe as an allusion to Cinderella or so that viewers might wait to hear "the other shoe drop". Instead, the shoe is presented as "lonesome aberration", and, on at least one occasion, is actively anthropomorphised by David. The comedy critic Bruce Dessau identified "stories of men who marry their VW Golfs or women who fancy the Eiffel Tower" as something he initially thought an inspiration, and noted The Good Life as a potential influence for David and Louise's lifestyle. However, the episode diverged strongly from what he had expected, as David's obsession did not involve romantic love, and the episode as a whole was low on humour. "Diddle Diddle Dumpling" is a relatively simple episode, described by one critic as "really just a quiet character study of a man losing his grip".

The episode uses Vivaldi's The Four Seasons to mark the passage of time, which is also portrayed by changing colour palettes. The score and setting convey David's emotional and mental fragility, with a contrast drawn between the chaotic music and controlled cinematography. The seasons, too, convey David's mental state: first the decline, then the "autumnal calm", then the collapse.

The episode's closing scene is, according to several critics, ambiguous, as it is unclear whether David has visited violence on Ted or on Sally. Similarly, the nature of Louise's relationships with both Ted and Chris is open to interpretation: one critic noted the "little moment" of Louise's interaction with Chris, and questioned whether David might believe Louise to be having an affair with Ted.

The family's home has a "sterile" feeling, and features a large number of objects in symmetrical pairs. This mise-en-scène reflects "David's psychosis, and what he and Louise [have] lost in the death of Sally's twin brother". Relatedly, shots of unoccupied rooms create a sense of emptiness, while the final shot of Ted shows him as a "half person". Critics identified the direction as Hitchcockian, while Tandy characterised it as Bergmanesque.

The "number 9" of "Diddle Diddle Dumpling" was not the family home, but the shoe, which was size 9. Despite taking place in a small number of rooms or just outside, the episode does not have the feeling of claustrophobia that is present in some other episodes. "Diddle Diddle Dumpling" represented a sharp change of tone from the previous episode of Inside No. 9, "Empty Orchestra". For Mark Butler of i, the episode's melancholic mood, uneasy domestic setting, and allusions to mental illness link it to "Tom & Gerri", an episode from Inside No. 9's first series.

== Reception ==
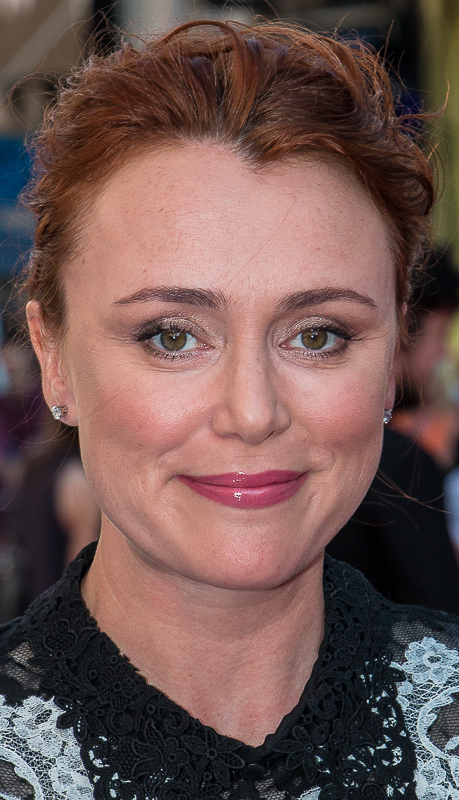
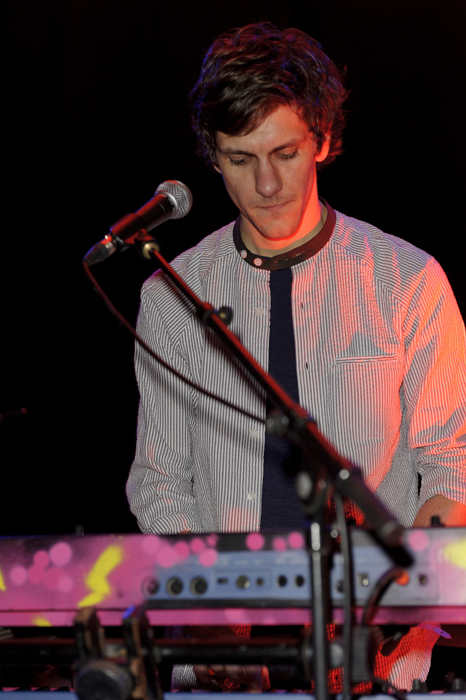
Keeley Hawes (left, 2014) and Mathew Baynton (right, 2011) were praised for their performances in "Diddle Diddle Dumpling".

"Diddle Diddle Dumpling" was very well received by critics, some of whom characterised it as an improvement on the weaker "Empty Orchestra". Dessau identified it as a "terrific instalment", while O'Grady discussed it as a key example of how high-quality television continues to survive in the 21st century, as part of "a renaissance in British comedy". It was, for him, comparable with the best of Shearsmith and Pemberton's previous work; Billen, similarly, characterised it as one of the best episodes of Inside No. 9. For the freelance critic Dan Owen, "Diddle Diddle Dumpling" was a "characteristically rich and rewarding experience", for Patrick Smith of The Daily Telegraph, it was a "delicious slice of macabre humour", and for Hannah J Davies, of TheGuardian.com, it was "excellent", even if "not the strongest episode of the series". Mark Butler, of inews.co.uk, said that the episode "managed to weave a genuinely gripping and powerful half hour of TV from a seemingly bizarre and banal set-up: a testament to [Inside No. 9's] ongoing mastery of mood".

Julie McDowall, of The National, called it "a brilliantly slow, creeping and sinister episode". Similarly, Victoria Segal and Helen Stewart of The Sunday Times praised the way that the episode "builds up an atmosphere of creeping dread", but were critical of the "slightly tasteless conclusion" to which the episode "dribbles". In the sister paper The Times, however, Billen praised the conclusion, saying it "brought with it a tide of distress"; on the website of The Times, Hugo Rifkind characterised the ending as somewhat anticlimactic, suggesting that the best mysteries are never solved. Also writing for The Times, Chris Bennion praised the "near genius" premise, calling the episode a "witty glimpse of midlife inadequacy" that became darker as it progressed. Butler identified the device of the shifting seasons as "a clever and striking touch", characterising the episode as moving from "laugh out loud" humour to "profoundly uncomfortable" interactions, with a "hard to swallow" and "disquieting" conclusion.

Morales's direction received high praise, as did the performances of Hawes, Baynton, and especially Shearsmith. Bennion, though, suggested that Hawes and Baynton were "somewhat underused".
