= Empty Orchestra =

- Inside No. 9 episode
- A publicity photograph featuring (back row) Emily Howlett as Janet, Javone Prince as Duane, Tamzin Outhwaite as Connie, Sarah Hadland as Fran, Reece Shearsmith as Greg and Steve Pemberton as Roger.
- Episode no.: Series 3 Episode 4
- Directed by: Guillem Morales
- Written by: Steve Pemberton; Reece Shearsmith
- Editing by: Joe Randall-Cutler
- Original air date: 7 March 2017

Guest appearances
- Tamzin Outhwaite as Connie; Sarah Hadland as Fran; Emily Howlett as Janet; Javone Prince as Duane; Rebekah Hinds as Chantel

Episode chronology
← Previous "The Riddle of the Sphinx"	Next → "Diddle Diddle Dumpling"

"Empty Orchestra" is the fourth episode of the third series of the British dark comedy anthology television programme Inside No. 9. Written by Steve Pemberton and Reece Shearsmith and directed by Guillem Morales, the episode was first shown on 7 March 2017, on BBC Two. "Empty Orchestra" is set in a karaoke booth, and follows a group of colleagues—Greg (Shearsmith), Fran (Sarah Hadland), Connie (Tamzin Outhwaite), Janet (Emily Howlett) and Duane (Javone Prince)—celebrating the promotion of Roger (Pemberton). Rebekah Hinds also features.

"Empty Orchestra" is close to a musical. The characters sing throughout much of the episode, with the story being told through the lyrics and the way the characters interact during songs. In comparison to other episodes of Inside No. 9, "Empty Orchestra" is upbeat, features romantic elements, and lacks explicitly bloody or macabre references. The filming experience and resulting episode was a highlight of the series for Pemberton, but raised technical challenges, in part due to simultaneous singing and talking.

Television critics had a mixed reaction to the episode. In both The Daily Telegraph and The National, it was characterised as weaker than others in the series. The change in tone divided commentators, some of whom found the setting and constant noise a distraction. The writing and production, however, were praised, while the cast were commended both for their performances and their willingness to embrace the episode's concept.

== Production ==
The third series of Inside No. 9 was announced in October 2015, and was heavily publicised beginning in January 2016, at which time Sarah Hadland, Javone Prince and Tamzin Outhwaite were named as guest stars in the series. "Empty Orchestra" was the fourth episode of the series, and the third of a run of five episodes beginning February 2017—the series's first episode being the December 2016 Christmas special "The Devil of Christmas". It was first shown on 7 March 2017, on BBC Two.

"Empty Orchestra"—the name of which is a literal translation of the Japanese word karaoke—was written by Pemberton and Shearsmith, and was directed by Guillem Morales. It was the last episode of the series to be written, and was filmed on a set constructed at Shepperton Studios. The sides of the set could be removed for filming purposes, but, for the most part, the performers were confined.

"Empty Orchestra" was originally intended as a wholly musical episode. The initial conceit was that the story would be wholly told through song, but this was not possible. For Shearsmith, the reality of this was difficult to maintain; on the episode commentary, Pemberton expressed a wish that there was less dialogue. The closest example to the original intention of storytelling wholly through singing in the final episode was the performance of "I Know Him So Well". Nonetheless, the resulting episode, for Pemberton, was "a kind of musical", in that "there's music all the way through it". While he would be interested in doing "a proper La La Land-style musical" in the future, "Empty Orchestra" serves to "[tick] that box to some degree". The idea of a love story, which is how Pemberton characterised "Empty Orchestra", was also "very appealing". Pemberton ultimately chose the episode as his favourite of the series, calling it very different to other episodes of Inside No. 9. At the series launch, speaking in reference to the previous episode "The Riddle of the Sphinx", Pemberton said that "When you've cut someone's bum off and eaten it, you kind of go, well, better try something different!" One influence on the episode was Shane Meadows's This Is England; Pemberton drew inspiration from the way that characters' enjoyment of music events was portrayed in the film.

=== Cast and filming ===
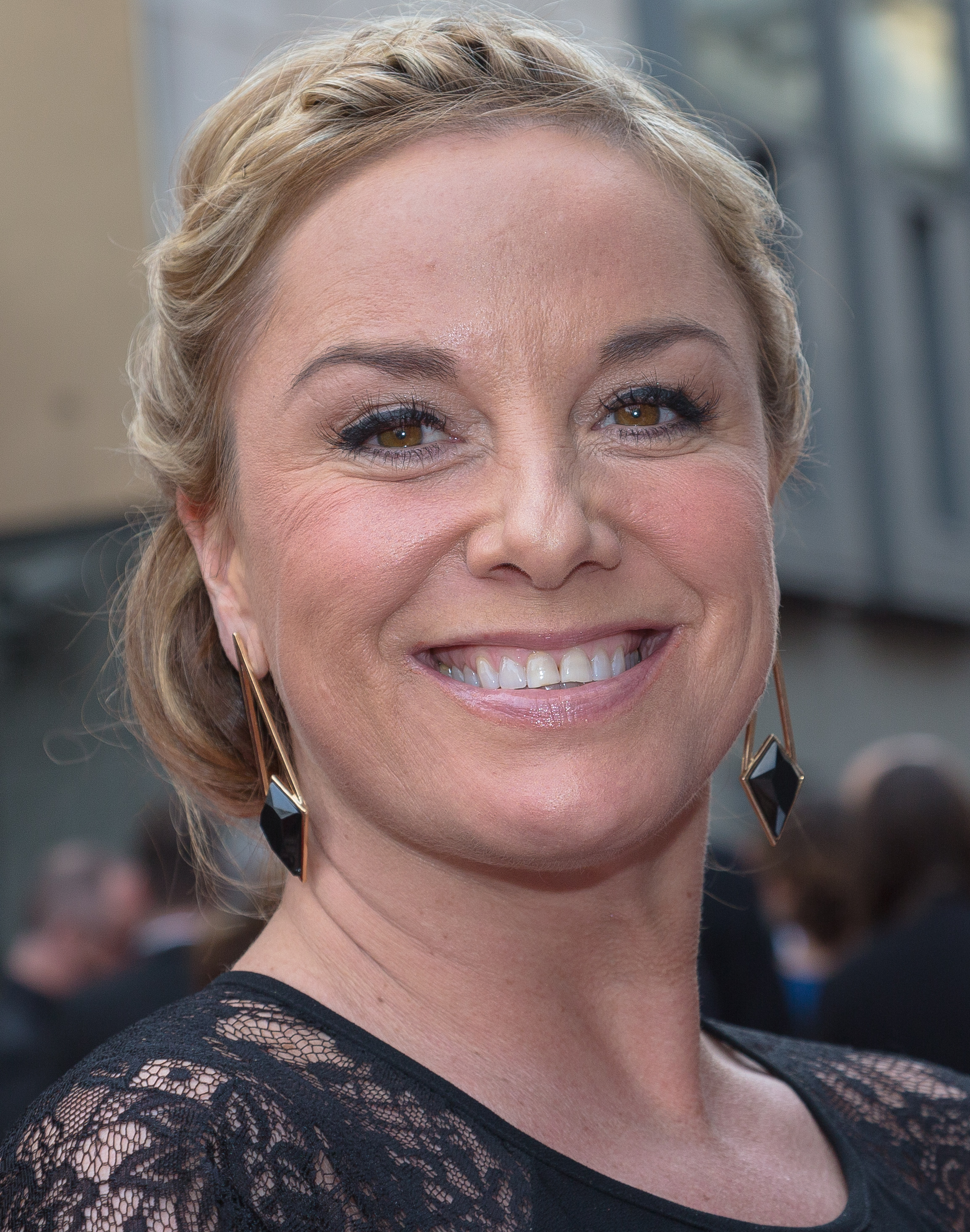
Tamzin Outhwaite (pictured, 2015) starred in "Empty Orchestra" as Connie, who is in fancy dress as Amy Winehouse.

"Empty Orchestra" stars Pemberton as Roger, who is celebrating a promotion with five colleagues: Greg, played by Shearsmith; Connie, played by Outhwaite; Fran, played by Hadland; Janet, played by Emily Howlett; and Duane, played by Prince. Rebekah Hinds also stars as Chantel. As an anthology series, Inside No. 9 features a new cast each episode, which the writers say re-energises them. During filming, Outhwaite and Hadland said that Pemberton and Shearsmith would not enjoy working with another cast more; the following week, the writers jokingly sent them pictures with Fiona Shaw and Morgana Robinson (who star in "Private View"), claiming to be having more fun.

Howlett, like Janet, is deaf. Unlike Howlett, however, Janet is "quite passive, quiet, sweet and generally happy looking after people, especially her boss". As Janet sings, Howlett faced a particular acting challenge. She possesses, she explained, "very little understanding of what constitutes music, and no idea at all about things like keys, pitch or melody – I even struggle with the concept of 'high' and 'low' sounds". The song Janet sings—"Only You" by Yazoo—was particularly challenging. Howlett sought help from the composer John Chambers, with whom she had previously worked, and with his help, learnt the song's rhythm and then placed the lyrics relative to it. Chambers then produced a "board of 'tune'", with words sung with a high note placed physically higher on the board, and Howlett tried various methods to train herself to sing different pitches. The whole process took a considerable amount of time, but "In the end, it paid off, because I got the role. It was one of the best and most welcoming sets I've been on, especially in mainstream filming. I never once felt like a token Deaf, which is rare and beautiful."

The writers opted to have the characters in fancy dress to add a layer of visual interest. Outhwaite, Howlett, and Shearsmith expressed their enjoyment of the fancy dress aspect of the episode. Shearsmith initially wore an inflatable sumo suit, but air in the suit produced sounds that interfered with music. The alternative suit was made of foam. Pemberton's character wore a very minimal costume, and Pemberton himself was mostly unchanged; he simply wore glasses and had his hair brushed forward.

Outhwaite had long been a fan of Inside No. 9 and the work of Pemberton and Shearsmith, the former of whom she had worked with in an episode of Hotel Babylon. She was particularly pleased to appear alongside Hadland, as the pair are old friends, and characterised her duet with Hadland as her favourite scene. She loved her "selfish, sad and manipulative" character, Connie. The filming process was, for her, extremely enjoyable and memorable. Pemberton said that Hadland and Outhwaite "brought a bubbly energy which injected into the hysteria of that room", naming the episode's production his favourite filming experience from the series. Shearsmith pointed to the scene in which "a hen party invades the karaoke room and they start singing. The music was pumped up and we had a mini party, with mad dancing – that was a memorable scene to film."

The filming introduced a number of technical challenges, with the producer Adam Tandy explaining that the simultaneous singing and conversing made production particularly difficult: "To record it all 'clean' and have options in the edit, that was technically hard on everybody." Typically, karaoke scenes in television will see characters sing only the opening lines, but because of the format of Inside No. 9, the characters in "Empty Orchestra" sing the whole song. Each character sang a song, with the vocals recorded live. For technical reasons, the recording of vocals had to be done without a backing track. The actors wore an earpiece to listen to the music while singing; Howlett's, used so that she could feel the beat, was taped under her wig, and she was counted in by Outhwaite. Filming took a week, with days focussed on particular songs.

== Plot ==
External videos
- "DeeDeeDaDaDa"; Greg (Shearsmith), Connie (Outhwaite), Fran (Hadland) and Janet (Howlett) toast Roger (Pemberton), who has received a promotion.

Greg, dressed in a sumo-themed fatsuit, enters a karaoke booth and begins singing The Human League's "Don't You Want Me". Connie, dressed as Amy Winehouse, arrives; the two kiss, but break apart when Greg's partner Fran (dressed as Britney Spears) enters. Roger arrives with his assistant Janet; Janet, who is deaf, is dressed as Boy George, and Roger, who has no outfit, puts on a clown's nose when prompted. The group are celebrating Roger's promotion and, to Greg's alarm, Roger has an envelope with a list of names. Fran begins singing Whigfield's "Saturday Night" before Duane, dressed as Michael Jackson, arrives. He has the group play "pills roulette"; each take either ecstasy, Viagra, ketamine, Paracetamol, a laxative or a Tic Tac. Roger is distracted, soon leaving for more drinks; Greg is keen to know what he has written, believing someone is being laid off.

Duane starts Wham!'s "Wham Rap!"; Janet "listens" by placing her hand on the speaker, until Greg quizzes her on lay-offs. Connie takes Duane's phone to text Janet, and Roger returns with shots, which he drinks alone. Janet's text from "Duane" asks her to sing him a song if she likes him. Watched by Janet, Connie tells Greg to make a choice between her and Fran. Roger starts Rainbow's "Since You Been Gone" and Greg conspires with Connie and Fran to acquire the envelope. Roger, having danced with Connie, is aroused, but Duane says that all the pills were Tic Tacs. Greg finally reaches the envelope, and Fran's name is circled. Roger reveals that the envelope contains divorce papers; his wife is leaving him. Fran sings "I Know Him So Well" (Elaine Paige and Barbara Dickson), first to Roger and then Greg. She duets with Connie, and, hugging Fran, Greg mouths to Connie that Fran is getting sacked. Connie and Fran, the latter oblivious, sing to each other, as Roger signs his divorce papers. When the song finishes, Roger sombrely talks to Fran.

Janet sings Yazoo's "Only You" to Duane, who stops the music after Fran whispers to him. Chastising Connie, Duane says that he does not like Janet "in that way". Roger steps in; someone has to be made redundant, but it will be him, and he has recommended that Fran be promoted. A hen do arrives in the booth, and a newcomer, Chantel, begins "Titanium" (David Guetta and Sia). Watched by Janet, Connie confronts and kisses Greg; Roger meets eyes with a young woman. Connie mocks Janet, who reminds the former that she can lip read. Janet whispers to Fran, who confronts Greg and Connie; UV light reveals Connie's lipstick on Greg's mouth, and Fran tells them that they are both fired. Fran sings with Chantel, Roger dances with the young woman, and Greg and Connie argue. Duane and Janet meet eyes, and Duane places her hand on his chest; she feels his heartbeat as the two kiss.

== Analysis ==
"Empty Orchestra" follows a relatively simple narrative of co-workers on a night out, telling several interweaved stories through body language, muffled conversations, and relevant song lyrics. Phil Harrison, writing for The Guardian, characterised the episode as "a study in communication breakdown; how people use booze, loud music and enforced jollity to fill the gaps between them". Possibilities for macabre developments are seeded early in the episode, but, contrary to viewer expectations, these possibilities are cut off; for example, Duane's "pills" are merely Tic Tacs, and Roger's list—as revealed in his "David Brentish" speech—has no sinister purpose. Viewer expectations (and possible criticisms) are anticipated by Pemberton's Roger saying "it's not just going to be one song after another, is it?"

Much of the story is told by the songs, with the lyrics coordinating with the events of the story. For example, "Don't You Want Me" introduces the affair between Greg and Connie, allowing them to flirt in the presence of Fran. It pre-empts the result of their relationship with the line "we will both be sorry"; this is unsung, but nonetheless emphasised. The song also speaks to the relationship between Greg and Roger, with Greg singing "don't you want me?" when he fears that he will be fired, and tells of Greg's character with lines including "Don't forget it's me who put you where you are now // And I can put you back there too".

== Reception ==
"Empty Orchestra" had a mixed reception from television critics, being awarded four out of five by Mark Ward of the Daily Express, three out of five by Ben Lawrence of The Daily Telegraph, and two out of five by the freelance journalist Dan Owen, who claimed that he "never warmed to" the episode, but considered it nonetheless worth watching. The comedy critic Bruce Dessau called it "a hit", and Mark Butler, of i, offered a positive review of an episode that, for him, "ended up being a down-to-earth, relatable and ultimately feel-good slice of drama". Many critics characterised it as weaker than other episodes of Inside No. 9, though both Julie McDowall (The National) and Lawrence stressed the quality of the programme overall, emphasising that "Empty Orchestra" was still commendable. The more upbeat story was "a refreshingly restrained change of pace for the show" for Butler, and possessed its "own charm" for Owen. Butler wrote that "some will have no doubt been disappointed" by the lack of a bloody climax, but that "variety in tone and story is what helps make Inside No. 9 work so well. You can't begrudge it a happy, straightforward ending every now and then."

The episode's plot and production were praised. For Mellor, "In barely any time at all, we'd been told a complete story that was satisfying, romantic and unexpectedly uplifting." Owen, similarly, argued that the episode "achieved what it wanted to, ending with a fantastic reveal [concerning UV lights] and each of the storylines were resolved quite nicely", though Lawrence felt that the "twist" involving Janet's ability to lip-read was "obvious". Patrick Mulkern (Radio Times) commended the production, and the inclusion of Janet, while Phil Harrison (The Guardian) called the episode an "object lesson in economical narrative". Mellor summarised the strength of the production and writing by saying that the elements "slotted in with real efficiency. Seeding the UV light early on provided a satisfying pay-off, and the shifts to Janet's aural point of view, along with the use of subtitles and director Guillem Morales' continually inventive shifts in [point of view], kept things varied and lively." Nonetheless, she considered the costumes a missed opportunity, perceiving no meaning behind the choices. The episode's greatest achievement, for Mellor, was the "lyrical cleverness".

A number of commentators were critical of the choice of setting. Though Lawrence claimed that it "illustrated how good Pemberton and Shearsmith are at creating maximum tension on a minimal budget", others found that it interfered with their enjoyment of the episode. For Owen, it "offered a definite production challenge that was made to look effortless ... but an appreciation of how well something was made isn't enough". Similarly, Lawrence felt that "amid the karaoke din, it was hard to get a proper handle on the characters or, indeed, really care about their fates".

While Owen did not consider the episode funny, Mellor called Roger's song "(tragi) comedy gold to match the farcical comedy of Greg's perpetually thwarted heist attempts". Lawrence described the characterisation as "painted with the broadest of brush strokes, but that suited the super-annuated, hypercharged nature of the plot and the faintly camp dialogue", praising Pemberton in particular. The guest stars were praised for their willingness to support the episode's concept. Dessau picked out Outhwaite's performance as particularly strong; both Mulkern and Lawrence praised Howlett, with Mulkern saying that she put him "in mind of a young Victoria Wood and the sympathetic women she used to bring to life".
