= The Riddle of the Sphinx (Inside No. 9) =

- Inside No. 9 episode
- Reece Shearsmith as Dr Tyler, Alexandra Roach as Nina and Steve Pemberton as Professor Squires in a promotional poster for the episode
- Episode no.: Series 3 Episode 3
- Directed by: Guillem Morales
- Written by: Steve Pemberton; Reece Shearsmith
- Editing by: Joe Randall-Cutler
- Original air date: 28 February 2017
- Running time: 32 minutes

Guest appearance
- Alexandra Roach as Nina

Episode chronology
← Previous "The Bill"	Next → "Empty Orchestra"

"The Riddle of the Sphinx" is the third episode of the third series of the British dark comedy television programme Inside No. 9. It first aired, on BBC Two, on 28 February 2017. The episode was written by the programme's creators, Steve Pemberton and Reece Shearsmith, and directed by Guillem Morales. "The Riddle of the Sphinx", which is set in Cambridge, stars Alexandra Roach as Nina, a young woman seeking answers to the Varsity cryptic crossword, Pemberton as Professor Nigel Squires, who pseudonymously sets the crossword using the name "Sphinx", and Shearsmith as Dr Jacob Tyler, another Cambridge academic. The story begins with Nina surreptitiously entering Squires's rooms on a stormy night and being discovered; this leads to Squires teaching her how to decipher clues in cryptic crosswords.

The plot of "The Riddle of the Sphinx" revolves around the clues and answers to a particular crossword puzzle. The idea to focus an episode on crosswords came from Pemberton; he had long been a fan of cryptic crosswords, but particular inspiration came from Two Girls, One on Each Knee: The Puzzling, Playful World of the Crossword, a non-fiction book by Alan Connor. The crossword featured in "The Riddle of the Sphinx" was set by Pemberton, and was published in The Guardian on the day the episode aired, credited to "Sphinx". This crossword contains multiple ninas—hidden messages or words. Along with many of the crossword's answers, one nina is integral to the episode's plot. A second was introduced accidentally, and then incorporated into the episode. A third nina is an Inside No. 9 in-joke.

Influences for "The Riddle of the Sphinx", which emphasises gothicism over comedy, include Anthony Shaffer's 1970 play Sleuth, the work of Anton Chekhov, and the 1989 film The Cook, the Thief, His Wife & Her Lover. Critics responded extremely positively to the episode, lauding its writing and the precise attention to detail in the production. Commentators noted that the episode was very dark, and probably the cleverest episode of Inside No. 9 to date. Roach's performance was praised, as was the direction of Morales.

== Plot ==
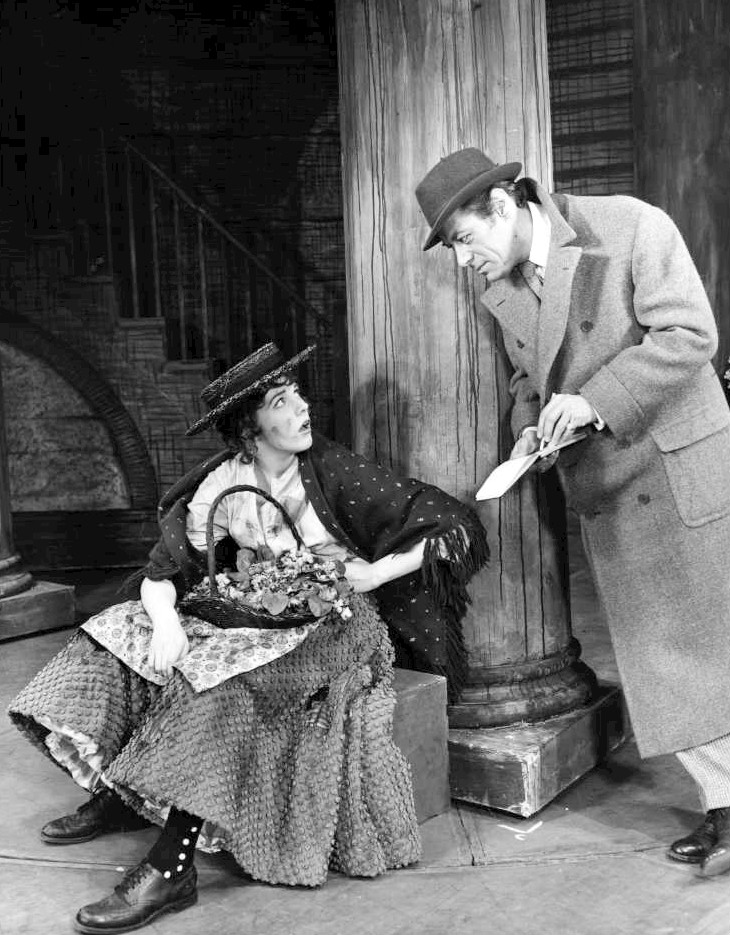
Eliza Doolittle (Julie Andrews) and Professor Henry Higgins (Rex Harrison) in My Fair Lady. The relationship between Nina and Squires mirrors that of Doolittle and Higgins, while the episode references both the musical and the play on which it is based, Shaw's Pygmalion.

On a stormy night, Nina sneaks into a University of Cambridge room, where she is found by Professor Nigel Squires. He is holding a gun, but it is not loaded. Nina's boyfriend Simon is a fan of cryptic crosswords, she explains, but she is never able to help him. She has come to the rooms of Squires—a classicist who sets crosswords for Cambridge's Varsity as Sphinx—to seek the answers to the next day's crossword. Squires sets about teaching Nina: "I teach wild creature without hospital building" results in ARCHITECTURE, which Simon studies. They turn to the clues for the next day, beginning to fill a large grid. Squires uses the name of the Sphinx because she would asphyxiate and consume those who failed to answer her riddle: she was, he says, "devious and deadly". Squires makes tea, as Nina looks at his trophies. A picture of Squires with his late wife draws her attention, and they discuss the cut-throat world of competitive crosswording. Asking about Simon, Squires catches Nina in a lie; she answers that she only wants to learn. Together, they deduce DOWN AND OUT, WRAP, DESI, TRENT, and SWAMPLANDS, meaning "bog". Nina, though, suggests that the clue should say bogs, otherwise Squires would be cheating.

Suddenly spluttering, Squires takes a seat, as Nina begins on the next clue. She now displays clear proficiency, answering ASPHYXIATION. Squires drops his cup, as Nina continues to fill in the crossword, including SOWERBERRY and KNOWITALL. Squires is deadly still in his chair, watching. Nina is a marine biologist, and had acquired tetrodotoxin from a pufferfish, which causes paralysis and asphyxiation. Simon was actually Nina's brother, and is visible on the photo of Squires and his wife. Simon had reached a crosswording final only to be beaten by Squires after the latter challenged that a u looked more like a v. Depressed by the defeat, Simon had killed himself. Squires leaps up unharmed to Nina's shock; he fills out NEUN and ASPS, revealing the nina ISWAPPEDCUPS. As Nina induces vomiting, Squires calls Dr. Jacob Tyler, an old friend and Nina's supervisor who had warned him. Squires places a paraylzed Nina on a chair and goes back to the crossword, filling out UNDERSLIP; asking about the underwear young women wear, he gropes Nina's body and kisses her on the mouth.

Tyler enters. He tells Charlotte—"Nina"—to hang on, before turning to the crossword. With Squires, he works out MYSTERYGUEST. Tyler reveals that he has no antidote for Charlotte and will not call the emergency services. Instead, he wants Squires to eat Charlotte, as the Sphinx would. Tyler tells Squires that he cannot call the police, as the crossword displays premeditation: the KNOWITALL received a MYSTERYGUEST at number NEUN, resulting in ASPHYXIATION. Tyler reveals PUFFERFISH, predicting, with reference to crossword answers, that a DOWN AND OUT will find Charlotte wrapped in her UNDERSLIP in SWAMPLANDS. This is, Tyler says, his revenge. Squires tells of how he began an affair with Monica, Tyler's wife and mother of his twin children, destroying Tyler's career. Tyler fries and hands Squires a cut from Charlotte's buttocks; he eats, fearing Charlotte will die.

Tyler reveals that he hates cryptic crosswords, and how his son—Simon—entered the Cambridge Crossword Competition to beat his mother's new husband: Squires. After the suicide, Simon's autopsy revealed that Simon and Charlotte were actually Squires's children. Charlotte and Tyler sought revenge on Squires, but Tyler informed Squires knowing he would include clues in the crossword and incriminate only himself. In the present, Tyler places a bullet on Squires's desk and reminds Squires of the Chekhov's gun principle. He notices a coincidence on the crossword and circles it. Charlotte is dead, and Nigel Hector Squires loads the gun, placing it in his mouth, weeping. Blood splatters over the crossword and a second nina: RIPNHS.

== Production ==
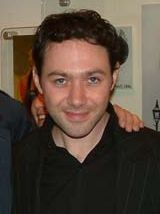
Reece Shearsmith (pictured, 2003) co-wrote "The Riddle of the Sphinx" and stars as Dr Jacob Tyler

The third series of Inside No. 9 was announced in October 2015, and heavily publicised in January 2016, at which time Alexandra Roach was named as a guest star in the series. The series began with the Christmas special "The Devil of Christmas" (December 2016) and continued with "The Bill" (February 2017), the latter of which was the first of a run of five episodes, of which "The Riddle of the Sphinx" was the second. The episode was first aired on 28 February 2017. It was shown on BBC Two at 10:00 pm, clashing with first episode of the third series of Catastrophe, the acclaimed Channel 4 comedy.

"The Riddle of the Sphinx" was written in the summer of 2015, one of the last of the series, and was filmed in December that year. Most of the episode was filmed in Langleybury, a country house in Abbots Langley, Hertfordshire, which had previously been used for the Inside No. 9 episodes "The Harrowing" and "Séance Time", as well as the house of Oscar Lomax in the Shearsmith and Pemberton television series Psychoville. The opening exterior shot was filmed in a court of Gonville and Caius College, Cambridge. The idea to set the episode during a storm, which gave it a gothic quality, was Morales's. For Shearsmith and Pemberton, this was an example of an advantage to having a third party direct episodes, in contrast to "Cold Comfort" and "Nana's Party" from the second series, which they had directed themselves. Close-up shots of the crossword and the blackboard were filmed later, some on the set of "Private View", which introduced potential continuity problems. The episode was filmed after two days' rehearsals. The script was 32 pages in length, resulting in a first cut that was 38 minutes long. The BBC permitted the final version to be a little longer than the half hour typical of Inside No. 9, but the production team still needed to lose several minutes in the edit. The final run-time for the episode is 31 minutes and 35 seconds.

"The Riddle of the Sphinx" was characterised by Pemberton as a thriller in the style of Anthony Shaffer's 1970 play Sleuth, while Shearsmith identified the episode as particularly theatrical, in the style of Sleuth and Ira Levin's 1978 play Deathtrap. BBC executives, according to Shearsmith, saw the episode as a cross between Sleuth and Willy Russell's 1980 play Educating Rita that read as if it had been authored by psychopaths. The executive producer Jon Plowman suggested that the first half of the episode plays out like a radio play. The word-play and tea-drinking in this part of the episode are, in the writers' opinion, very English; the episode then changes character. Civilisation is "stripped away", resulting in the episode having the elements of a Greek tragedy. A further inspiration was the 1989 film The Cook, the Thief, His Wife & Her Lover; at the end of the episode, Squires faces a situation that mirrors one faced by Michael Gambon's Albert Spica.

An initial idea for the plot saw only two characters, but a third, for the writers, introduced a compelling dynamic; keeping the cast small also served to keep production costs relatively low. The episode stars Roach as Nina, Pemberton as Professor Nigel Squires—whose name is a reference to the crossword setter Roger Squires—and Shearsmith as Dr Jacob Tyler. Roach and Shearsmith had previously collaborated on the television programme Hunderby. Roach said in an interview before the episode's airing that she is drawn to darker scripts; she said that she loved Inside No. 9, describing the episodes as "very gruesome, psychological thrillers, [which] always have great twists". She described Nina as highly naive. Two doubles were used in the episode in place of Roach. One was used in the exterior shot at the start of the episode; a second was a "bottom double" seen towards the episode's close.

Shearsmith identified "The Riddle of the Sphinx" as one of his two favourite episodes of the series, along with "The Devil of Christmas". For the writers, the episode was not comedic, and they expressed awareness of the differences between episodes of Inside No. 9 like "The Riddle of the Sphinx" and the expectations of viewers for television comedies. The pair acknowledged the particular complexity of the plot, with Pemberton saying "If you missed two sentences in a row, you'd be like 'what?' Even I was thinking how are people following this? It's insane."

=== Crossword setting ===
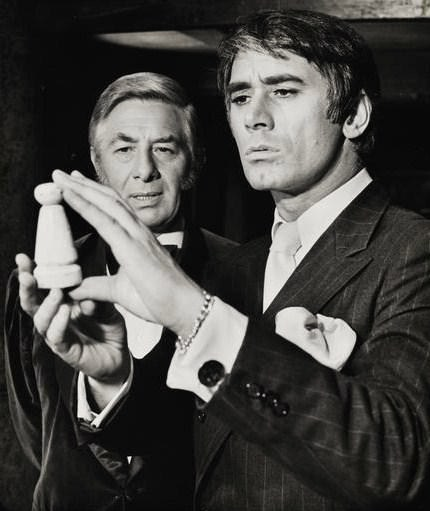
Paul Rogers and Keith Baxter in a production of Anthony Shaffer's Sleuth, a key influence for "The Riddle of the Sphinx"

Pemberton had long been a fan of cryptic crosswords, and he was inspired to develop the episode by reading Two Girls, One on Each Knee: The Puzzling, Playful World of the Crossword, a non-fiction book by Alan Connor. Pemberton had first met Connor through an appearance on the BBC game show Only Connect, on which the latter was working as a question setter. Subsequently, he received a copy of Connor's book. Reading Two Girls, One on Each Knee led Pemberton to ask whether one could "dramatize doing a crossword, which is so un-dramatic?" Pemberton explained that he and Shearsmith relish the challenge set by writing limitations, such as basing an episode around a crossword. Such constraints, he felt, encourage them to produce their best work.

With assistance from Connor, Pemberton compiled the crossword around which the episode revolves. Connor was credited as the episode's "Crossword consultant"; further assistance was provided by Hugh Stephenson, then the crossword editor for The Guardian. The puzzle contains a range of themed entries and ninas—hidden words or messages—making it a particularly challenging crossword for a first-time designer. Pemberton began with ISWAPPEDCUPS, the key nina, and two of the long themed words (PUFFERFISH and ASPHYXIATION). He then experimented with remaining clues, and was able to include MYSTERYGUEST, KNOWITALL, UNDERSLIP and NEUN. A second nina (RIPNHS) was created accidentally and seen at the last minute; by introducing a middle name for Pemberton's character, the writers were able to make it a part of the plot. At least one of the clues used in the episode—Squires's improvised "I teach wild creature without hospital building", resulting in ARCHITECTURE—was not a good one. This was acknowledged by Squires in the episode, but was kept in as it reflected Squires's view of his own actions.

Pemberton hoped that "The Riddle of the Sphinx" would work as a mini-tutorial for cryptic crosswords. Shearsmith, meanwhile, had never attempted a cryptic crossword before working on the episode, but has subsequently started completing them. Nonetheless, Pemberton acknowledged that not everyone enjoys crosswords, hence "I always hated cryptic crosswords. Why can't people just say what they mean instead of trying to trick you all the time?" from Shearsmith's Tyler. In an interview with Connor, published after "The Riddle of the Sphinx" had aired, Pemberton explored the ways in which writing for Inside No. 9 was like writing for a cryptic crossword; in both cases, misdirection is key and utterly arbitrary choices or happenings can serve as important inspirations.

In the DVD commentary for the episode, Shearsmith and Pemberton expressed a hope that Pemberton's crossword could be published before the episode's airing, so that viewers would be able to watch the episode having unknowingly already completed the crossword around which it revolves. Pemberton's crossword was published in The Guardian on the same day that the episode aired, credited to "Sphinx"; for one critic, this explained and justified the answer MYSTERYGUEST. The collaboration between Inside No. 9 and The Guardian drew inspiration from the collaboration between The Simpsons and The New York Times for "Homer and Lisa Exchange Cross Words" in 2008. Pemberton dedicated the crossword, which was his first in print, to the late Kenny Ireland. The two of them had completed the Guardian crossword daily while filming together for the television comedy Benidorm. Allowing a one-off contribution from a non-regular setter was deeply unusual for The Guardian, whose crosswords are normally produced by one of about 25 regular setters.

Pemberton, again writing as Sphinx, went on to publish further cryptic crosswords in The Guardian. One appeared in 2018, during the airing of the fourth series of Inside No. 9. The puzzle worked independently of any references to Inside No. 9, but included "an extra layer for [Inside No. 9] viewers". A crossword written for a brief appearance in the BBC's Dracula was published in 2020, and Pemberton also published a crossword featuring a nina requesting points from Greg Davies as part of his appearance on series 17 of Taskmaster in 2023. (This was published months before the episode aired, allowing, in Pemberton's words, "some very clever people" to guess that he was appearing on the programme before it was officially announced.) A 2024 puzzle marked the end of Inside No. 9.

== Analysis ==
Sphinx's completed crossword as it appeared on theguardian.com with the three ninas highlighted: ISWAPPEDCUPS (red), RIPNHS (blue) and ONELEPUS (yellow)

"The Riddle of the Sphinx" is less comedic than many episodes of Inside No. 9, drawing upon gothic themes. Several critics identified Sleuth—"a grandfather of sorts" to Inside No. 9—as a key influence. William Shakespeare's Titus Andronicus, the 1973 horror film Theatre of Blood, and the work of Anton Chekhov were also identified as possible influences. Chekhov and his work are referenced in the episode; the narrative principle of Chekhov's gun is referred to in the closing seconds, while Squires identifies the gun in the episode as from a production of The Seagull, which was authored by Chekhov. This play, like "The Riddle of the Sphinx", features a character named Nina and a gunshot suicide. Mark Butler, writing for inews.co.uk, noted the references to Greek tragedy, arguing that the episode "followed a long tradition of grotesque dramatic reveals".

The character of Nina is reminiscent of Eliza Doolittle, with Squires acting as Henry Higgins. The episode explicitly references Bernard Shaw's play Pygmalion, from which these characters originate, while Squires's language echoes that of Higgins in My Fair Lady, the musical adaptation of the play.

=== Ninas ===
Nina, as well as being the name of a character in the episode, is a name given by cruciverbalists—crossword enthusiasts—to hidden messages in crosswords, such as Squires's ISWAPPEDCUPS. Butler and the comedy critic Bruce Dessau suggested that the crossword answers may contain a hidden political message. On the episode's audio commentary, Shearsmith denied that the nina RIPNHS should be read as a political statement, namely "Rest In Peace National Health Service". Similarly, in his interview with Connor, Pemberton noted that "most people" think that the nina is political, but that it was an accidental introduction, and only woven into the plot once the crossword had been completed.

Every episode of Inside No. 9 features an ornamental hare somewhere on-screen. According to Pemberton, "Because each episode is so wildly different there was nothing really linking them other than the fact they were all inside a Number Nine, I just thought it would be nice to have an object that you could hide and just have there on every set." There is no particular significance to the hare itself. In "The Riddle of the Sphinx", the hare is visible, though not clearly, on a table in Squires's fireplace. There is also a "second" hare; though it is not visible in the partially completed crossword shown at the end of the episode, the crossword published in The Guardian contains a nina spelling ONELEPUS, Lepus being the generic name for hares.

== Reception ==
External videos
- "No pressure" Professor Nigel Squires explains why he goes by the Sphinx.

Critics responded very positively to "The Riddle of the Sphinx", which was variously called a "brilliant episode" of Inside No. 9, comfortably the best thus far of the third series, and even "one of the best" episodes ever. It was praised by Ben Lawrence of Telegraph.co.uk for its "near brilliance", while Dessau characterised it as a "beautiful constructed playlet". At the end of the fourth series, Butler listed "The Riddle of the Sphinx" as the second strongest episode of Inside No. 9, describing it as "sheer brilliance". He listed "The 12 Days of Christine" as the strongest.

The episode was widely noted as both very dark, and very clever. Dessau characterised it as the cleverest episode of Inside No. 9, and the freelance journalist Dan Owen described it as "undoubtedly the most complex and surprising instalment of [Inside No. 9], favouring attention to detail and narrative precision"; similarly, Mellor called it "the most complicated tale Inside No. 9 has ever spun". The plot offered "much to admire" for crossword fans, but viewers' enjoyment, it was suggested, may depend on how much they enjoy crosswords. The latter half of the episode introduced a very wide array of twists; Owen speculated that the episode could lose viewers at the end due to its "minimal hand-holding", suggesting that there may have been too many twists. "If you missed just one line of dialogue", he explained, "it would've left you scrambling to understand exactly what's going on between the three characters".

Nonetheless, the episode was, for Owen, "a writing masterclass", created with considerable skill, and with a plot that held together even when scrutinised. Mellor, similarly, praised the intelligence of the plot, provided one takes "on faith the unlikely notion that a mother and her new husband would have no contact with her children from a previous marriage, not even recognising them as adults". "From the lightning flashes that punctuate hints and story shifts to the wordplay and in-jokes peppered through the script", Mellor said, the episode is highly precise. Butler called the episode's ending one of Inside No. 9's darkest and most bizarre. Some, he suggested, "may have found it a bit too unpalatable", though he added that the plot and ironic humour suggested that viewers "can perhaps avoid taking it too seriously". Morales received particular praise for his attention to detail and foreshadowing of future events in the episode, with Mellor explaining that he and the writers

continually draw our attention to the key props of the gun and the teacups. The camera follows Squires' gun to his desk drawer and we're kept aware of its presence thanks to Nina and Squires' "If I’d shot you, here in the dark/With an empty gun? Good luck" exchange. Nina is shown drinking from the poisoned cup one of two times she admiringly calls Squires "devious" (a hint at her true feelings about him) and once again when she emphasises the word "plan". While Squires is telling the story of the Sphinx and she seems to be gazing at the statue of it, she's actually looking at the photograph of her brother on display directly below.

The actors' performances were also commended, with particular praise for Roach, who was characterised as "funny, likeable and endearingly crude as Nina, then captivating and clever when the charade drops". Patrick Mulkern, writing for RadioTimes.com, also praised the "zingy funny lines" in the earlier part of the episode, and Butler commended the "smart, gentle humour" offered by the contrast between Nina and Squires.
