= The Bill (Inside No. 9) =

- Inside No. 9 episode
- Craig (Philip Glenister), Archie (Reece Shearsmith), Kevin (Jason Watkins), and Malcolm (Steve Pemberton) arguing over who should pay for their meal
- Episode no.: Series 3 Episode 2
- Directed by: Guillem Morales
- Written by: Steve Pemberton; Reece Shearsmith
- Editing by: Joe Randall-Cutler
- Original air date: 21 February 2017

Guest appearances
- Jason Watkins as Kevin; Philip Glenister as Craig; Ellie White as Anya; Callum Coates as Tim

Episode chronology
← Previous "The Devil of Christmas"	Next → "The Riddle of the Sphinx"

"The Bill" is the second episode of the third series of the British dark comedy anthology television programme Inside No. 9. It first aired on 21 February 2017, on BBC Two. The episode was written by Reece Shearsmith and Steve Pemberton, and was directed by Guillem Morales. "The Bill" focuses on four men—Archie, Malcolm, Kevin, and Craig—arguing over who should pay the bill in a restaurant at closing time, much to the dismay of the waitress Anya. It addresses themes of masculinity and competition, and the English north–south divide is a recurring issue; Craig, the visiting southerner, is wealthier than the other three, and unfamiliar with some of their terminology.

The episode was inspired by a real dispute seen by the writers, and also influenced by Yasmina Reza's play Art. "The Bill" starred Pemberton as Malcolm, Shearsmith as Archie, Jason Watkins as Kevin, Philip Glenister as Craig, and Ellie White as Anya. Callum Coates played Tim, who appears in the episode's final scene. Though set in northern England, the episode was filmed in a Hendon restaurant. Commentators compared the episode to the television series Hustle, the work of the director Quentin Tarantino—including his 1992 film Reservoir Dogs—and Roald Dahl's 1948 short story "Man from the South", which was adapted for both the television series Tales of the Unexpected and the 1995 anthology film Four Rooms.

Critics responded positively to "The Bill", praising its humour, direction and acting. Glenister, Watkins, and White were all singled out for particularly compelling performances. Despite considerable praise for the writing and timing, some commentators questioned the effectiveness of a twist in the closing minutes, several criticising the final scene. "The Bill" won Shearsmith and Pemberton the Best TV Situation Comedy award at the 2018 Writers' Guild Awards.

== Plot ==
External videos
- "No arguments" Craig insists that he should pay the bill

Anya closes a restaurant where four men—northerners Archie, Malcolm, and Kevin are entertaining Londoner Craig—have finished a post-badminton meal. After a misunderstanding between Craig and the thickly accented Anya, Malcolm takes the bill, but he and Archie both wish to pay. Craig insists that he will pay, as he is leaving, and wealthier than the others. The three argue, Archie being unable to pay as the card machine lacks paper. Malcolm suggests that the bill should be split three ways, the northerners treating Craig, but Kevin claims to be the poorest. Archie, Malcolm, and Craig thrust cards at Anya until Kevin offers to pay. He counts cash as Anya fetches drinks. Craig thanks the others for making his trip bearable, and offers to pay, restarting the argument. The dispute becomes about Malcolm's position as badminton-club secretary, and Malcolm reveals that Archie has spent time in prison. Anya arrives with drinks, and Craig, paying the bill, speaks of craving excitement, only to have his card declined. He phones his au pair for a card, keen she not look in the wrong drawer, but Malcolm snatches the phone. He is about to pay, but Archie stops him. Archie reveals that he wanted to pay as he has an inoperable brain tumour.

A distressed Malcolm leaves the table only to return furious; Archie was lying. A heated debate ensues, and the four men wrestle over the bill until Anya tells them that the meal can be free. Malcolm insists it is not about the bill, and fetches a knife and chopping board. Archie and Malcolm are to play stabscotch, with the winner paying. Malcolm is quick but Archie is slower, repeatedly stabbing himself. Craig pulls the knife from Archie, inadvertently slashing Anya's throat. She collapses as blood splatters. Anya is dead, and Malcolm formulates a story blaming Archie, but Archie has called a prison contact who will remove the body.

The clean-up will cost £200,000; it is needed tonight, in cash, meaning only Craig can pay. He calls his au pair, but treads on Anya's hand, and she yells. Kevin declares the plan a failure; Archie, Malcolm, Kevin, and Anya had been hustling Craig. Kevin, now in control, demands Craig's phone. Craig refuses, but is locked in the restaurant. In a final scene, a waiter closes the restaurant while the hustlers ("Archie", "Malcolm", "Kevin", and "Anya") entertain the well-dressed Tim. "Archie" requests the bill, and "the waiter" is revealed to be Craig, who has joined the hustlers to satiate his cravings for excitement. (Note: The relationship between Craig and the other hustlers in the final scene is not explicit in the episode, but is explained by Shearsmith and Pemberton in their episode commentary.)

== Production ==
The second series of Inside No. 9 aired from 26 March 2015 to 29 April 2015, and in October the BBC confirmed a third series. Further information, including hints at settings and confirmed performers, was released in January 2016, around which time the series was filmed. "The Devil of Christmas", the first episode of this third series, was shown as a Christmas special on 26 December 2016 on BBC Two. "The Bill", the second episode of the third series and the first of a run of five episodes, followed two months later, on 21 February 2017.

=== Writing and filming ===
Inspiration for "The Bill" came when Shearsmith and Pemberton, the creators of Inside No. 9, saw a group arguing over a bill at a Muswell Hill restaurant. The writers had an office in the area, and had lunch at the same restaurant every day while writing the programme's third series. The group was made up of three older people: two women and a man. Pemberton said that, unexpectedly, "they were arguing about wanting to pay it, and we just came out and thought, 'Could that be one episode?' ... And then it's about sustaining that one idea". For him, "when you're in the writing phase, you can see anything in day-to-day life that could spark your imagination"; after seeing this dispute, the writers immediately returned to their office to begin writing. Another inspiration, according to Shearsmith, was Yasmina Reza's play 'Art', which, like "The Bill", involves escalating arguments between friends. Richard Bean's stage version of the 1987 film House of Games, meanwhile, was identified by Shearsmith as sharing an "intensity" with the more violent moments of "The Bill".

Much of the script was originally written prior to the decision to include the twists in the episode's closing minutes, and some parts that were written were not filmed. This included the characters playing a word-based drinking game with limoncello. Limoncello remained a part of the narrative, however, and formed the basis of a joke that was one of Shearsmith's favourites from the series: a quip that the thickly accented waitress was likely to bring a lemon and a cello rather than glasses of limoncello. For Pemberton and Shearsmith, the episode was particularly claustrophobic, and, in this sense, it mirrored "Sardines" and "La Couchette", the first episodes of the first and second series of Inside No. 9 respectively.

The episode was filmed in a restaurant/nightclub in Hendon, London. The location, which was close to Pemberton and Shearsmith's homes, was found by the Inside No. 9 producer Adam Tandy. "The Bill" is set in the north of England at night; this introduced particular filming challenges. Takes had to be re-shot or edited if a London bus was visible out of the restaurant's windows, and some takes, including many of the character Craig (as his chair faced away from the restaurant's windows) could only be done later in the working day, otherwise daylight would be visible on-screen.

=== Cast ===
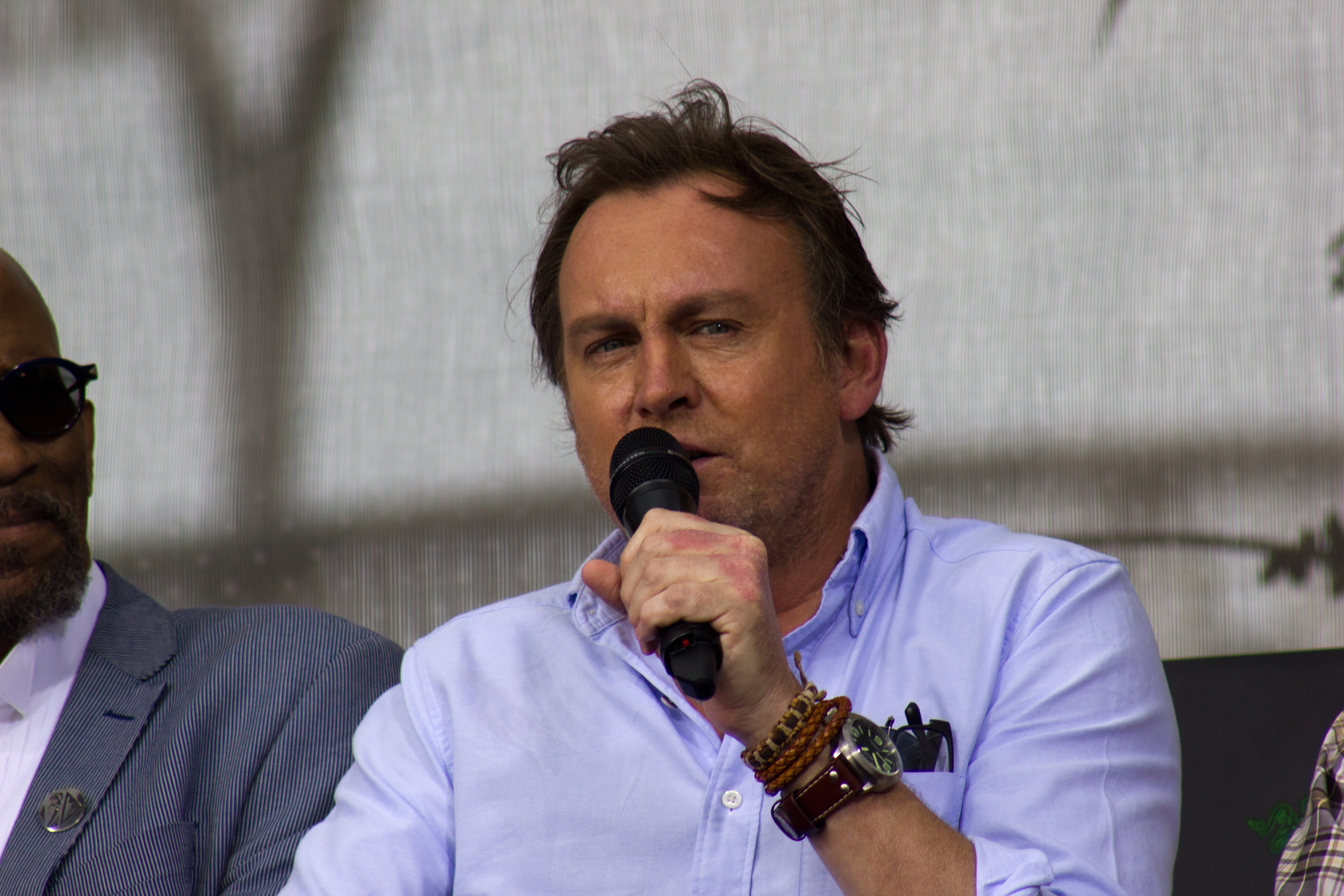
Philip Glenister (pictured, 2017) starred as Craig, a wealthy Londoner.

As each episode of Inside No. 9 features new characters, the writers were able to attract actors who might have been unwilling to commit to an entire series. "The Bill" starred Shearsmith as Archie, Pemberton as Malcolm, Jason Watkins as Kevin, Philip Glenister as Craig, Ellie White as Anya, and Callum Coates as Tim. For his role, Pemberton wore an Eddie Large-inspired wig, but had his own beard. He also wore padding to appear larger. Pemberton explained that he and Shearsmith work hard to make roles attractive to accomplished actors, claiming that Glenister had hoped he would not like the script, looking for an excuse to turn down a week's work in his busy schedule. Pemberton and Glenister had known each other for many years prior to "The Bill"; they shared a mutual friend, and Glenister had appeared in productions for Pemberton's theatre company 606 Theatre. Glenister and Watkins, too, had worked together on a play read-through in the past. Prior to filming, Watkins had not met White, a less-well-known performer, who was sought out by Pemberton and Shearsmith due to her appearance in People Time, an acclaimed pilot that was shown as part of BBC Three's Comedy Feeds.

Watkins had previously starred in Shearsmith and Pemberton's black comedy television programme Psychoville; the pair say that though they generally have a rule against "reusing" actors from Psychoville in Inside No. 9, so as "to keep surprising and avoid familiarity", they broke it "because [Watkins is] brilliant". He was not the only actor for which the writers broke this rule. Performers were also reused in "The Trial of Elizabeth Gadge" and "Cold Comfort", for example. Pemberton highlighted working with Watkins again as one of the highlights of the series. Watkins said he was attracted to Inside No. 9 by the chance to work with Pemberton and Shearsmith again. He described the episode as "like a beautifully constructed little play for television" with "a great mix of characters and surprising plots". His character, meanwhile, he called "put-upon and pathetic and petty".

== Analysis ==
Archie: A diddlum! You never heard of a diddlum?
Craig: No...
Archie: It's where you pay in a bit each week.
Kevin: It's a savings scheme.
Craig: What, sort of like a northern thing? Y'know, 'Put that money in t'diddlum and buy us some whippets and barm cakes and...'. Sorry, go on.

— The English north/south divide is a recurring theme in the episode; Malcolm, Archie, and Kevin are northerners, while Craig is a southerner.

"The Bill" opens with the mundane image of men eating at a restaurant and arguing about the bill, but then, in the words of one critic, "takes that familiar scenario and pushes it to impressively baroque extremes". In a reversal of the norm, all diners want to pay the whole bill, rather than wanting to limit their payment. In this dispute, "The Bill" explores themes of masculinity, losing face, competitiveness, passive aggression, and rivalry. Andrew Billen, writing in The Times, compared this aspect of the episode to the television series Mad Dogs, which had also starred Glenister; one critic suggested that Glenister's character in Mad Dogs and Craig in "The Bill" are similar. The characters tell "well-rehearsed anecdotes and blokey jokes", while Craig is "all flash-cash and inappropriate comments to the waitress". Pemberton's Malcolm, for Michael Hogan of The Daily Telegraph, "appeared to have wandered in" from a Mike Leigh production; several critics commented on his striking hairpiece. All four of the men are unpleasant people.

The English north–south divide is a key feature of the plot and humour, with many references to north–south caricatures. Craig is unfamiliar with the northern phrases used by Archie, Malcolm and Kevin, including diddlum, piss-mints, and bluecock (a "tight-fisted wanker"). Craig is wealthier than the other characters, and mocks them with stereotypes about northerners as poor and stupid. For one critic, the significance of the north–south divide in the episode means that it could have been called "Revenge of the Northerners".

After the revelation in the closing minutes of "The Bill", the character of the episode changes. The biggest changes come about in Watkins's Kevin and White's Anya. Kevin changes from a timid penny pincher referred to as "the professor" apparently in jest to a menacing criminal mastermind. Anya, initially reminiscent of Manuel of Fawlty Towers or a character from 'Allo 'Allo!, faces criticism from her co-conspirators for taking her characterisation too far, allowing the writers, for one critic, to have their cake and eat it—any exaggerated characterisation is the fault of the character, not the writers. The script also acknowledges the plot's "silliness" in an almost-fourth-wall-breaking piece of dialogue, when Shearsmith's Archie declares that the characters' plan "was too elaborate".

For one commentator, "The Bill" was the closest episode of Inside No. 9 to The League of Gentlemen, an earlier project of Shearsmith and Pemberton's, due to its use of gallows humour and back-and-forth dialogue. Critics also compared the episode to the television series Hustle, to the work of the director Quentin Tarantino—including the 1992 film Reservoir Dogs—and to Roald Dahl's 1948 short story "Man from the South". This latter story was adapted for the television series Tales of the Unexpected, a key influence on Inside No. 9 as a whole, and by Tarantino for the 1995 anthology film Four Rooms. Meanwhile, the premise was compared to that of "The Chinese Restaurant", a 1991 episode of Seinfeld.

== Reception ==
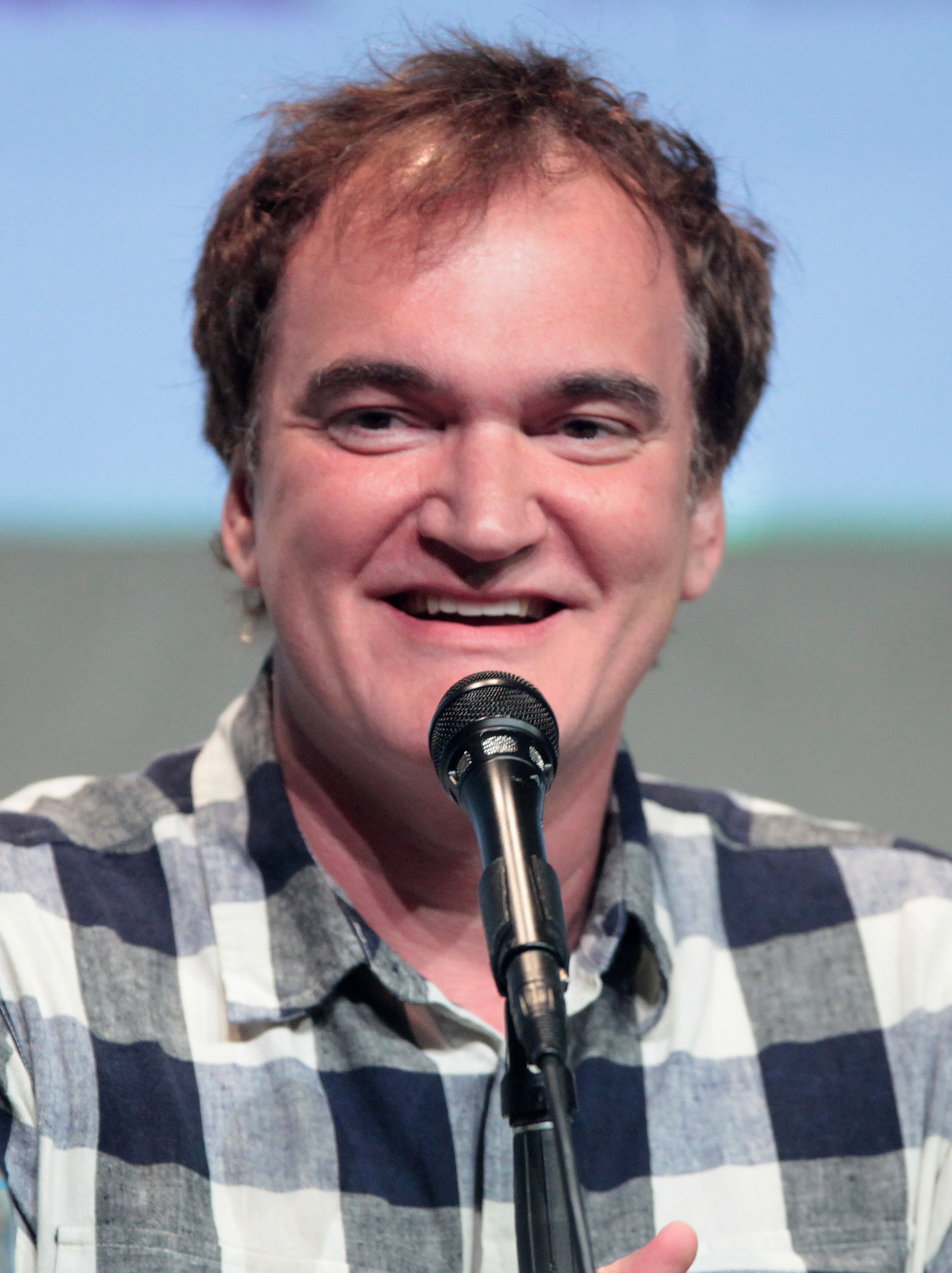
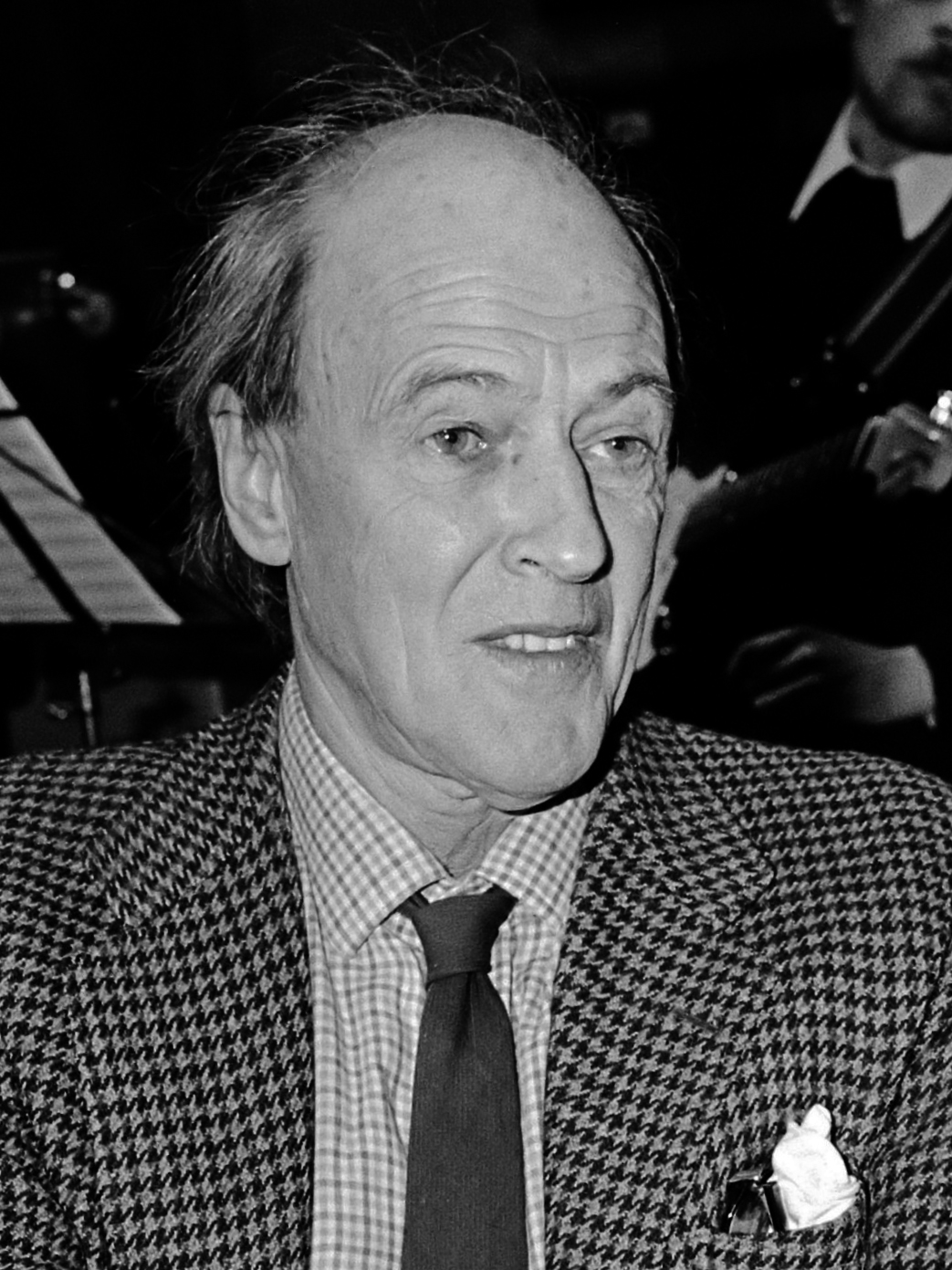
Critics compared "The Bill" to the works of Quentin Tarantino (left, 2015) and Roald Dahl (right, 1982).

"The Bill" was generally positively received by critics, being given ratings of five out of five by Mike Ward of the Daily Express, four out of five by Hogan (The Daily Telegraph) and the freelance journalist Dan Owen, and three out of five by Andrew Billen of The Times. It was praised as "a tight, gloriously stressful half-hour", "hugely enjoyable", "an intricate, wonderfully well-executed tale", and "terrific fun". Mark Butler, writing for inews.co.uk, said that while there had been Inside No. 9 episodes "with greater atmosphere, invention or ideas", this episode, "as a 30-minute exercise in darkly comic suspense, ... did the trick". It was not, for Butler, among the best episodes; after the conclusion of the fourth series, he identified "The Bill" as the 20th best episode, out of 24. The comedy critic Bruce Dessau described "The Bill" as "quite a low-key opener for the series proper". Ian Hyland, writing in the Daily Mirror, considered "The Bill" a competitor with "The 12 Days of Christine" for the distinction of the best episode of Inside No. 9 ever.

The episode was praised as genuinely funny, with a range of different kinds of humour. Praise was also directed at Morales, both Louisa Mellor (Den of Geek) and Owen commenting on his ability to give the impression of movement, even while the episode revolved mostly around four men sitting at a table. Critics commended the performances; Dessau called the cast "uniformly excellent", and Owen said that the script was "brilliantly performed". Ellen E Jones, writing for the London Evening Standard, praised both Glenister and Watkins; Hogan did likewise, but argued that Watkins "stealthily stole the show". Owen suggested that, in the episode, "Watkins again proved why he's one of the most underrated comic actors around right now". Mellor identified Watkins and White as offering the strongest performances. Hogan praised White for offering "estimable support", while Billen identified White as the performer who "stole the half-hour".

The story, for Mellor, was strong; "the shocks have the intended impact and the whole half-hour works a treat". She commended the "good writing [and] excellent structure". Hogan considered the episode "ingeniously plotted", and Owen called it "delightfully written". The timing was also praised. Critics were less convinced by the revelation at the end of the episode; though Butler initially called it "satisfying and surprising", he later characterised "the overly-elaborate ending" as lowering the quality of the episode. The ending was criticised as lacking in meaning, and as "prosaically disappointing". For Billen, the reveal made the episode's premise "less interesting", and, for Owen, the characters were too quick to admit defeat. The final scene, in particular, was criticised, some commentators suggesting that, if thought about too much, it was not fully convincing; it was described as "arguably unnecessary" and as offering the episode's only "punch [that failed] to connect".

=== Writers' Guild Award ===
At the 2018 Writers' Guild Awards, administered by the Writers' Guild of Great Britain, Shearsmith and Pemberton won the Best TV Situation Comedy award for their work on "The Bill". The award was presented by Brenda Gilhooly. The other nominees were Daisy May Cooper and Charlie Cooper, the writers of This Country, and Simon Blackwell, for his work on Back.
