= My Son John (disambiguation) =

My Son John is a 1952 American drama film.

My Son John may also refer to:

- "My Son John", an Irish folk song, also known as "Mrs. McGrath"
- Diddle, Diddle, Dumpling, My Son John, a nursery rhyme

== See also ==
- My Son Johnny, a 1991 American television drama film
