= The Wasp (2024 film) =

British-American drama film

- Theatrical release poster
- Directed by: Guillem Morales
- Screenplay by: Morgan Lloyd Malcolm
- Produced by: Nate Bolotin; Maxime Cottray; James Harris; Leonora Darby; Matthew B. Schmidt; Sean Sorensen
- Starring: Naomie Harris; Natalie Dormer
- Cinematography: John Sorapure
- Edited by: Joe Randall-Cutler
- Music by: Adam Janota Bzowski
- Production companies: XYZ Films; IPR.VC; Royal Viking Entertainment; Paradise City Films; Tea Shop Productions
- Distributed by: Shout! Studios (United States); Universal Pictures (United Kingdom)
- Release dates: 13 June 2024 (Tribeca); 30 August 2024 (United States)
- Running time: 96 minutes
- Countries: United Kingdom; United States
- Language: English
- Box office: $45,987

The Wasp is a 2024 psychological thriller film starring Naomie Harris and Natalie Dormer, with Guillem Morales directing from a Morgan Lloyd Malcolm script, which she adapted from her own 2015 play.

The Wasp had its world premiere at the 2024 Tribeca Film Festival and received limited theatrical release in the United States by Shout! Studios.

== Plot ==
Carla, seven-months pregnant and with four children already from various men, working as a cashier in Bath, England, is contacted by Heather; best friends at school while pre-teens during Year 7, they meet up having not spoken in years. Heather – who has been trying unsuccessfully to become pregnant with her husband, Simon – asks Carla to kill Simon as he has been cheating on her. Heather offers her £50,000, which Carla gleefully negotiates to £75,000.

In Heather's house, Carla and Heather talk about how she will kill Simon. Carla plans to make it look like a botched burglary, admitting to having committed house burglaries in the past. Carla notices that Heather has framed insects on the wall, one of which is the tarantula hawk, a wasp which buries an egg into a tarantula and grows by eating the spider from the inside out avoiding any major organs, meaning the victim stays alive; the young wasp eventually crawls out of the tarantula's abdomen, leaving it to die.

While they continue planning the murder, Heather talks about how horribly Carla – a brutal school bully – had treated her when they were young, including viciously beating her face in a school store room. Carla tells her that their early friendship eventually disgusted her, growing to despise Heather for having a normal life while hers was filled with brutality from her own father.

Concluding the murder plan, Heather shows Carla a photo of Simon; Carla recognises him as "James", revealing that she is also a prostitute who has had Simon as a regular customer for some years, taking cash in return for unprotected sex that incidentally impregnated her. Heather then chloroforms Carla.

Carla awakes bound and gagged to a chair and Heather talks about the last time Carla had attacked her in school, having two other girls hold her while Carla raped her with an object, destroying Heather's reproductive organs. She then threatens Carla with death, that she will take her child from her, and reveals that she has already killed Simon. Heather pushes Carla to think that she is going to kill her, so acting on impulse Carla stabs Heather in the abdomen just as Simon opens the front door and enters the room. As the blood-soaked Heather dies in his arms, neighbours look in the window to see the entire situation, including Carla still holding the murder weapon; Heather had left them a note begging them for help, writing "I think my husband and his mistress are going to try and kill me". The police arrive seconds later.

The final shot is a tiny wasp crawling out of Heather’s body and flying away.

== Cast ==
- Naomie Harris as Heather
  - Leah Mondiser-Simmonds as young Heather
- Natalie Dormer as Carla
  - Olivia Juno Cleverley as young Carla
- Dominic Allburn as Simon, Heather's husband

== Production ==
The 2015 play The Wasp was described by Lyn Gardner as "enjoyably nasty" and transferred from Hampstead Theatre to the Trafalgar Theatre with Myanna Buring and Laura Donnelly in the roles of Carla and Heather.

Production of the film was announced in September 2022 with Guillem Morales, Natalie Dormer and Naomie Harris on board with production company XYZ Films, who also handled worldwide sales. Their producers Nate Bolotin and Maxime Cottray were announced to be joined by James Harris and Leonora Darby of Tea Shop Productions, Sean Sorensen of Royal Viking Entertainment, and Matthew B. Schmidt of Paradise City Films.

Principal photography took place in Bath, England in November 2022.

== Release ==
The Wasp had its world premiere at the 2024 Tribeca Festival on 13 June 2024. It received a very limited theatrical release in the U.S. by Shout! Studios on 30 August 2024, peaking at 98 theatres.

== Reception ==
=== Box office ===
In the United States and Canada, The Wasp grossed $36,878, with $9,109 in other territories, for a worldwide total of $45,987.

=== Critical response ===
On the review aggregator website Rotten Tomatoes, 75% of 36 critics' reviews are positive, with an average rating of 6.6/10. The website's consensus reads: "Elevated beyond its stagy trappings by Naomie Harris and Natalie Dormer's cunning performances, The Wasp draws blood with minimal irritation." Metacritic, which uses a weighted average, assigned the film a score of 69 out of 100, based on 8 critics, indicating "generally favorable" reviews.

Mae Abdulbaki for Screen Rant said that lead actresses Naomie Harris and Natalie Dormer give "awards-worthy performances" and deliver "intense, nail-biting portrayals of characters who are each deserving of sympathy".
