= Muriel Gray =

Scottish journalist

Muriel Gray FRSE
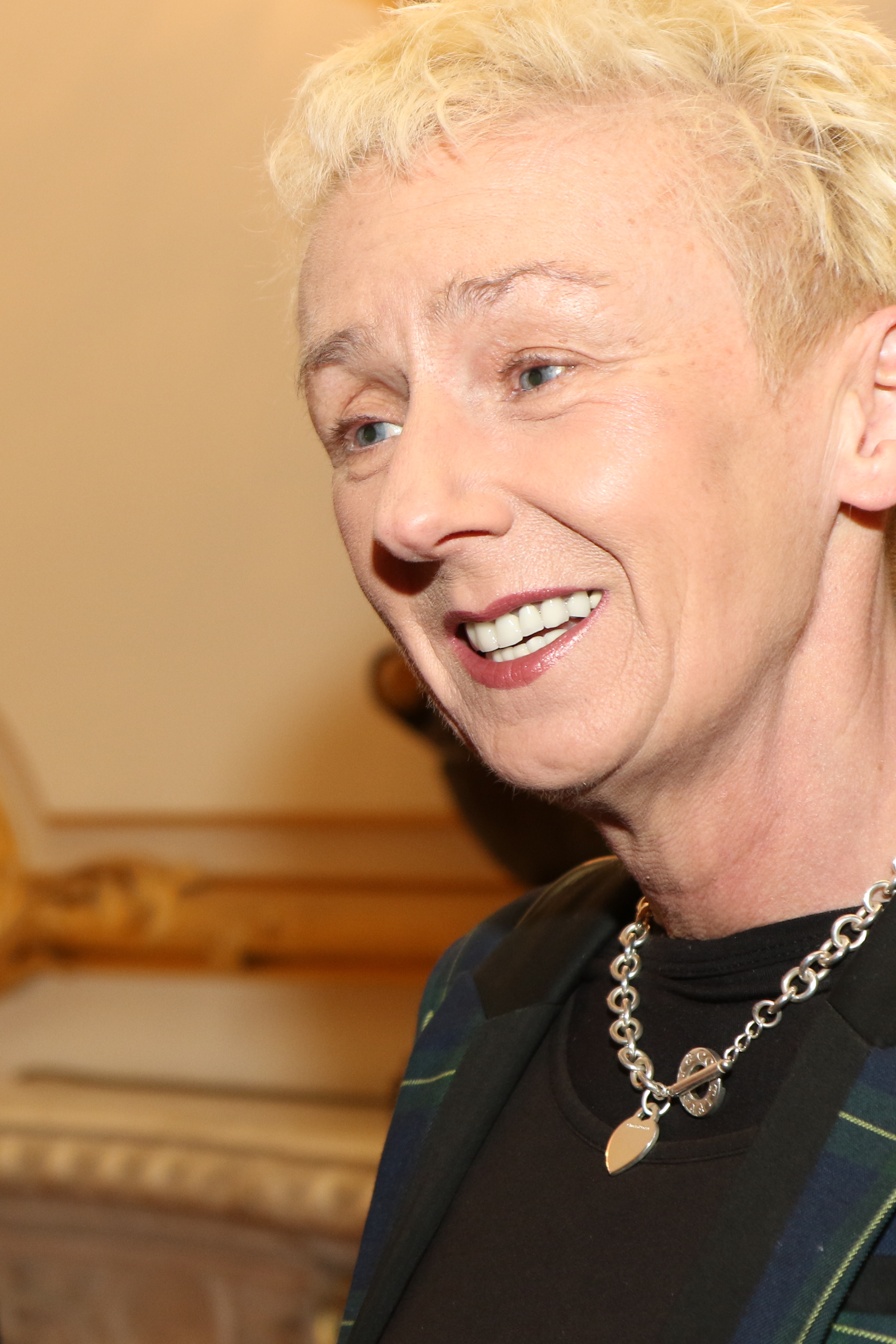
- Muriel Gray in 2017
- Born: 30 August 1958 (age 68); East Kilbride, Lanarkshire, Scotland
- Education: High School of Glasgow; Glasgow School of Art
- Occupations: Broadcaster; journalist
- Spouse: Hamish Barbour
- Children: 3

Muriel Janet Gray FRSE (born 30 August 1958) is a Scottish author, broadcaster and journalist. She came to public notice as an interviewer on Channel 4's alternative pop-show The Tube, and then appeared as a regular presenter on BBC radio. Gray has written for Time Out, the Sunday Herald and The Guardian, among other publications, as well as publishing successful horror novels. She was the first woman to be Rector of the University of Edinburgh and is the first female chair of the board of governors at Glasgow School of Art. She is a non-executive director of the BBC.

== Personal life ==
Gray was born on 30 August 1958 in East Kilbride, Lanarkshire, Scotland. She is of partly Jewish ancestry. She presented a documentary for Channel 4 tracing her Jewish roots on her mother's side, entitled The Wondering Jew (1996), in which she discovered her maternal line descended from what is now Moldova.

Gray has been married to television producer Hamish Barbour since 1991, and they have three children. In 1997, their daughter nearly drowned in a garden pond, which left her permanently brain damaged.

== Career ==
=== Early career ===
A graduate of the Glasgow School of Art, Gray worked as a professional illustrator and then as assistant head of design in the National Museum of Antiquities in Edinburgh.

=== Broadcasting ===
After playing in punk band the Family Von Trapp, she became an interviewer on the early Channel 4 alternative pop show The Tube from 1982; she was the main anchor on the short-lived ITV Border show Bliss in 1985, she presented Frocks on the Box (1987–88) and The Media Show (1987–89) again for Channel 4. She was briefly a DJ for Edinburgh's Radio Forth in 1983 and 1984. She was a regular stand-in presenter on BBC Radio 1 during most of the eighties, including for John Peel. She also presented regularly on BBC Radio 4, for Start the Week in Russell Harty's absence and also during Jeremy Paxman's leave.

Gray later presented The Munro Show (which documented her climbing a number of Scotland's highest hills, the Munros). She accompanied this with the book The First Fifty – Munro Bagging Without A Beard. She presented various other TV shows including Ride On, a motoring magazine show for Channel 4, The Design Awards, for BBC, and The Booker Prize awards for Channel 4.

Gray presented Art Is Dead – Long Live TV. This programme sparked a controversy when it was discovered that the series, covering the work of five artists, was a spoof.

Gray presented a BBC2 documentary on The Glasgow Boys, a group of influential 19th-century painters.

Gray co-presented Channel 4's coverage of the 2016 Turner Prize ceremony in Glasgow.

In 2017, Gray had a cameo in "Private View", the closing episode of the third series of black comedy anthology TV series Inside No. 9.

She appears on the BBC Two programme Grumpy Old Women.

=== Writing ===
Gray has been a columnist for Time Out magazine, the Sunday Correspondent, the Sunday Mirror, and Bliss magazine, and writes a regular column in the Sunday Herald, winning Columnist of the Year in the 2001 Scottish press awards. She writes regularly for The Guardian.

She became a horror novelist with the publication of The Trickster (1995), followed by Furnace and The Ancient. Stephen King described The Ancient as "Scary and unputdownable."

In 2004 a collection of short stories, Scottish Girls About Town: And sixteen other Scottish women authors was published. Gray was chosen with Jenny Colgan and Isla Dewar to feature on the cover.

She wrote a history of Glasgow's Kelvingrove Art Gallery and Museum to mark its re-opening in 2006.

In 2014 she contributed to the 21 Revolutions project which had been inspired by the collection held in the Glasgow Women's Library.

=== Production company ===
Gray started her own production company in 1989, originally named Gallus Besom (besom being a Scots or Northern English term of contempt for a surly or purposely awkward woman and gallus bold or cheeky in Scots), then renamed Ideal World in 1993. It merged in 2004 with Wark Clements, the company co-owned by Kirsty Wark and her husband Alan Clements, to form IWC Media. The partners then sold the new company in 2005 to media company RDF Media for an estimated £12 million.

== Honours and appointments ==
- She is a former Rector of the University of Edinburgh, the first woman ever to have held this post, and in 2006 was given an honorary degree of Doctor of Letters from the University of Abertay Dundee.
- In 2013 she was given an honorary degree, Doctor of Letters, from Glasgow School of Art and the University of Glasgow.
- In her guise as a mountaineer she appeared in the comic strip The Broons.
- She was the chair of the judges for the 2007 Orange Prize for Fiction.
- She was a judge of the Robert Burns Humanitarian Award.
- Gray was the vice chair of the committee choosing the architect for a new building to be constructed on a site facing Charles Rennie Mackintosh's Glasgow School of Art.
- Glasgow School of Art appointed her as their first female chair of the board of governors 2013-2021.
- Appointed to the board of trustees of The British Museum in December 2015 She resigned from this role in November 2023.
- Awarded honorary fellowship of The Royal Incorporation of Architects in Scotland in July 2016
- Elected a Fellow of the Royal Society of Edinburgh in March 2018
- Appointed to the Board of the BBC as a non-executive director from 3 January 2022 until 2 January 2030.

== Charity work ==
In 2005, Gray became Patron of the Scottish charity Trees for Life which is working to restore the Caledonian Forest. She is also a patron of the Craighalbert Centre, a conductive education school in Cumbernauld near Glasgow. She currently serves as a trustee on the following boards: the Glasgow Science Centre, the Scottish Maritime Museum, The Lighthouse and the Children's Parliament. She supports Action Earth. In January 2009 she became the first patron of Scotland's Additional Support Needs Mediation Forum, RESOLVE:ASL.

== Bibliography ==
=== Fiction ===
- The Trickster (1994), shortlisted for the 1995 British Fantasy Society Best Novel prize.
- Furnace (1996)
- The Ancient (2000)

=== Non fiction ===
- The First Fifty: Munro-bagging Without a Beard (1991) ISBN 978-0552139373
- These Times, This Place (2005) ISBN 0-9546333-7-7
- Kelvingrove Art Gallery and Museum: Glasgow's Portal to the World. (2006) ISBN 0-902752-79-0

Academic offices
Preceded by Archie Macpherson	Rector of the University of Edinburgh; 1988–1991	Succeeded by Donnie Munro
