= Naz Osmanoglu =

Anglo-Turkish comedian

- Born: Nazım Ziyaeddin Nazım Osmanoğlu; 24 September 1985 (age 41); Pembury, Kent, England
- Notable work: WitTank, Stand-Up, Flat News, Russell Howard's Good News, How Do They Do It Narrator
- Parent: Mehmed Ziyaeddin Osmanoğlu (father)

Comedy career
- Years active: 2004–present
- Medium: Stand-up, television, radio
- Genres: Social satire Observational comedy Absurdist humour
- Subjects: Television, everyday life, celebrities, Comedy

Şehzade Nazım Ziyaeddin Nazım Osmanoğlu (born 24 September 1985), known professionally as Naz Osmanoglu, is an Anglo-Turkish comedian and member of the Imperial House of Osman, former ruling dynasty of the Ottoman Empire.

== Personal ==
Osmanoglu studied English literature at Durham University (Van Mildert College), graduating in 2008. He was a member of The Durham Revue alongside Nish Kumar.

== Comedy ==
Osmanoglu was the winner of the 2009 "Amused Moose Laugh Off", runner-up in "So You Think You're Funny" in 2009, and member of sketch trio "WitTank", which featured on the BBC Three stand up and sketch series Live at the Electric. He also made an appearance in Russell Howard's Good News. He appeared in Flat TV, a short online comedy series for BBC Three, with flatmate Tom Rosenthal. Recently, he has performed stand-up shows titled 1000% Awesome and Ottoman Without an Empire, appearing at the Edinburgh Festival with both, as well as many gigs throughout the UK & Europe, and also in California.

In 2015, he visited Turkey, the home of his ancestors, for the first time. During his stay he visited the Dolmabahçe Palace where his grandfather Şehzade Cengiz Nazim was born. He also held three different standup shows that were well received by the Turkish audience.

In 2016, he had a small role in "The Devil of Christmas", the first episode of the third series of black comedy anthology Inside No. 9.

== Ancestry ==
Osmanoglu's father, Mehmed Ziyaeddin, is an Imperial Prince of the Ottoman Empire and a member of the non-reigning Imperial House of Osman. There is no real reference to the direct lineage of his father. His mother is of English origins from Kent, where the family lives.

== Full style ==
His Imperial Highness The Prince (Şehzade) Nazım Ziyaeddin Nazım Osmanoğlu, Imperial Prince of the Ottoman Empire, Member of the House of Osman

Osmanoglu is 16th in line to become the Head of the Imperial House of Osman. The Ottoman Empire was succeeded by the Republic of Turkey in 1923 after the monarchy was abolished the previous year; the members of the royal Ottoman (Turkish: Osmanlı) family were initially exiled to Europe. Osmanoglu uses his everyday nickname "Naz" and his last name (without the modern Turkish diacritic ğ) as his personal, professional, and stage name, being known simply as Naz Osmanoglu.

== See also ==
- Osmanoğlu family, the current family
- House of Osman, the family's historical form
- Line of succession to the former Ottoman throne
