= Guillem Morales =

Spanish filmmaker, playwright, and novelist

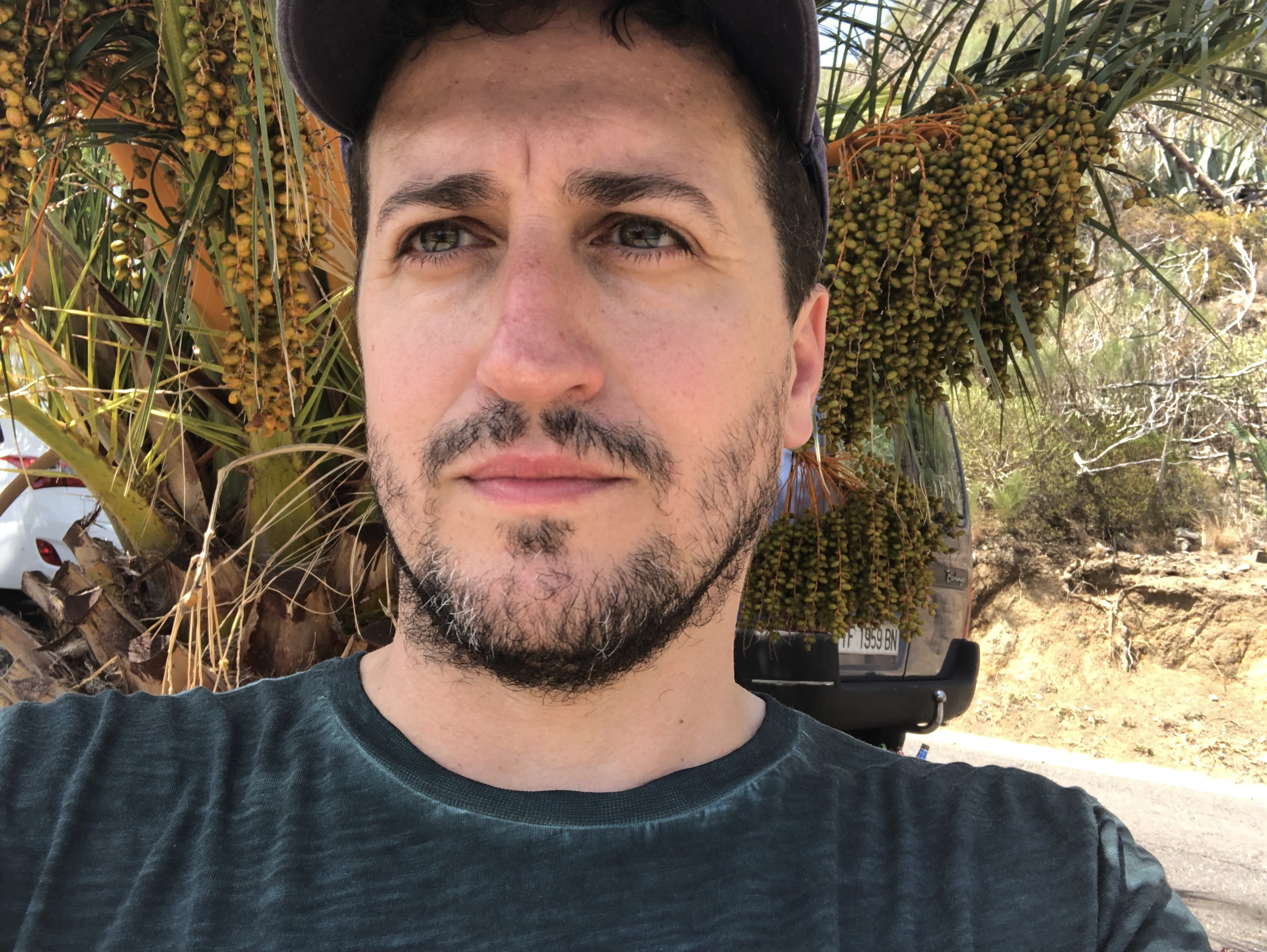
- Morales in August 2019
- Born: 1 September 1973 (age 53); Barcelona, Spain
- Occupations: Filmmaker; novelist
- Years active: 1999–present

Guillem Morales (born 1 September 1973) is a Spanish filmmaker and novelist. He is best known for writing and directing the Spanish thriller films The Uninvited Guest (2004) and Julia's Eyes (2010), directing various episodes of the British dark comedy series Inside No. 9 (2015–2024), and directing the British thriller film The Wasp (2024).

== Early life ==
Morales was born in Barcelona on 1 September 1973. He began studying art history at the University of Barcelona, then changed to study film.

== Career ==
=== Film ===
Morales' first short film, Back Room (1999), won several international awards and was nominated for a Goya Award for Best Fiction Short Film in 2000. This was followed by a second short film, Upside Down (2002), and two films in collaboration with the dance company Errequerre: Divadlo (2000) and APPAI (2006).

Morales made his feature-length directorial debut with the horror thriller The Uninvited Guest (El Habitante Incierto) in 2004, based on his own script and starring Andoni Gracia and Mónica López. The film premiered at the Sitges Catalonian International Film Festival on 21 October 2004, with Lopez winning the award for Best Actress. The film also won Best Picture at the Fant Festival of Bilbao. At the 20th Goya Awards, Morales received a nomination for Best New Director.

Morales' follow-up film, Julia's Eyes (Los Ojos de Julia) in 2010, was also a horror thriller. It was produced by Guillermo del Toro and stars Belén Rueda. Morales co-wrote the script with Oriol Paulo. The film premiered on 20 October 2010 in Spain. It was released in the United Kingdom by Optimum Releasing on 20 May 2011, and in Australia by Umbrella Entertainment on 2 June 2011.

In late 2022, Morales directed his first English-language feature film The Wasp, written by Olivier award winner Morgan Lloyd Malcolm and starring Oscar nominee Naomie Harris and Natalie Dormer. The film was shot in Bath and it was released in 2024.

Morales is also attached as director to other films. One of them is the screen adaptation of the novel Brother by Ania Ahlborn. The script is written by Fred Strydom.

=== Television ===
Since 2014, Morales has been directing for television series in the UK. Morales is best known for his work on the comedy horror TV anthology Inside No. 9, created by Steve Pemberton and Reece Shearsmith. This includes "The 12 Days of Christine", which was very well received by television critics. It was awarded five out of five stars by Andrew Billen of The Times and Benji Wilson of The Daily Telegraph, who respectively called it a "masterpiece" and "a quiet elegy, terse and polished, in many ways perfect". Morales' direction of this episode earned him a BAFTA Craft nomination for Breakthrough Talent at the 2016 British Academy Television Craft Awards. He went on to win a BAFTA when Inside No. 9 won the award for Best Scripted Comedy at the 2021 ceremony.

As director of Inside No. 9, Morales has directed actors including Jack Whitehall, Sheridan Smith, Alexandra Roach, Keeley Hawes, Fiona Shaw, Felicity Kendal, Fionn Whitehead, Gemma Whelan, Sir Derek Jacobi, Sian Clifford, and Nick Mohammed, among others.

Morales directed the following episodes of Inside No. 9:

- "La Couchette" (series 2)
- "The 12 Days of Christine" (series 2)
- "The Bill" (series 3)
- "The Riddle of the Sphinx" (series 3)
- "Empty Orchestra" (series 3)
- "Diddle, Diddle Dumpling" (series 3)
- "Private View" (series 3)
- "Love's Greatest Adventure" (series 5)
- "Misdirection" (series 5)
- "The Stakeout" (series 5)
- "Wuthering Heist" (series 6)
- "Simon Says" (series 6)
- "Lip Service" (series 6)
- "How Do You Plead?" (series 6)

In 2016 Morales directed the BBC three-part TV dramatisation Decline and Fall, which was based on the novel by Evelyn Waugh. It starred Jack Whitehall, David Suchet, Eva Longoria, Douglas Hodge, Stephen Graham, and Vincent Franklin, amongst others. The production, adapted by James Wood, was broadcast from 31 March to 14 April 2017 on BBC One, and was the book's first television adaptation. The series received largely positive reviews: Alastair Mckay of the Evening Standard called it "delicately constructed and pitch-perfect. Ellen E. Jones remarked on the show's "many enjoyable performances".

In 2017 Morales directed a three-part The Miniaturist, an adaptation of Jessie Burton's novel The Miniaturist. The adaptation was written by John Brownlow and produced by The Forge in conjunction with the BBC and Masterpiece. The series was filmed on location in Leiden in the Netherlands as well as in the United Kingdom. It starred Anya Taylor-Joy, Romola Garai, Alex Hassell, Hayley Squires, Papaa Essiedu and Emily Berrington. It was broadcast on 26 December 2017.

In 2018 Morales directed "The Mysterious Case of Agatha Christie", an episode of the Sky television series Urban Myths. The episode was written by Paul Doolan and Abigail Wilson and the cast included Bill Paterson, Rosie Cavaliero, Anna Maxwell Martin, Adrian Scarborough, Mark Bonnar and more. The episode was broadcast on 12 April 2018.

In 2019 Morales returned to Spain to direct the first three episodes of The Vineyard (La Templanza), a period drama series based on the novel by María Dueñas and produced by Buendia Estudios for Amazon Prime Video starring Leonor Watling, Rafael Novoa, Emilio Gutiérrez Caba, Nathaniel Parker, Raúl Briones, Esmeralda Pimentel, Mónica Huarte, Alejandro de la Madrid and Juana Acosta amongst others. It was released on 26 March 2021.

=== Theatre ===
In 2017, Morales adapted the famous novel Frankenstein by Mary Shelley for the stage, which was performed at the Teatre Nacional de Catalunya. The play premiered in Barcelona on 15 February 2018, and ran until 25 March 2018. It was very successful, with 800 seat theatre being sold out every evening. The work was directed by Carme Portaceli and starred Angel Llàcer as Frankenstein and Joel Joan as the monster.

Frankenstein marked Morales' first foray into writing for theatre, and is the only time so far in his career he has written professionally in his mother tongue language, Catalan. The project was proposed to Morales by Carme Portaceli, due to their long friendship and desire to collaborate. In adapting Frankenstein for the stage, Morales and Portaceli had the chance "to explore the darkest territories of the wounded humanity of the myth". At the press conference, Morales stated that "Frankenstein is, in fact, two stories in one: that of the creator, which begins in light and ends in darkness; and that of the creature, which starts in darkness and finishes in light. Two beings who, even though they hate each other, are united by the bond of creation."

Morales was not interested in discussing the Promethean aspect of Doctor Frankenstein, but rather the power of Nature, stating that, "the mystery is not up there, but in the womb of the woman" and he also explained that, "the true tragedy is Frankenstein's irresponsibility in abandoning the Creature." In her extensive review, Gema Moraleda picked up on this aspect, stating that Morales' work "moved away from the most obvious interpretation [...] to face perhaps the most human and terrifying story, that of the abandonment of what is created, the child, without wanting to take responsibility for it. Morales presents us with a undoubtedly evil, selfish, and cowardly Doctor Frankenstein, willing to do anything to avoid acknowledging his actions and their consequences. Facing him is a monster who is not originally so, but is driven to it by the evil and misunderstanding of the world. A monster who could have loved him but who has no choice but to hate him".

=== Books ===
Morales has published two fiction novels to date, with Plaza y Janes. The first novel, El Accidente de Lauren Marsh (The Accident of Lauren Marsh), was published in 2020. The book was a 2020 finalist for the Memorial Silverio Cañada Award for best first novel in Spanish noir. The second novel, La Hora del Lobo (Wolf Night), was published in 2022.

== Personal life ==
Morales has lived and worked in London since 2010.
