= Diddle, Diddle, Dumpling, My Son John =

Song

"Diddle, Diddle, Dumpling, My Son John" is an English language nursery rhyme. It has a Roud Folk Song Index number of 19709.

== Lyrics ==
One modern version is:

Diddle, diddle, dumpling, my son John,
Went to bed with his trousers on;
One shoe off, and the other shoe on,
Diddle, diddle, dumpling, my son John.

Alternate versions include:

Diddle diddle dumpling, my son John
Went to bed with his britches on.
One shoe off, and one shoe on;
Diddle diddle dumpling, my son John.

Deedle, deedle, dumpling, my son John,
Went to bed with his stockings on;
One shoe off, and one shoe on,
Deedle, deedle, dumpling, my son John.

== Origins ==
The rhyme is first recorded in The Newest Christmas Box published in London around 1797. It may be derived from 'Diddle, diddle, diddle Dumpling', a traditional street cry of hot dumpling sellers.
