= The Devil of Christmas =

- Inside No. 9 episode
- A poster for the episode, showing Rula Lenska as Celia, Steve Pemberton as Julian, Reece Shearsmith as Klaus and Jessica Raine as Kathy
- Episode no.: Series 3 Episode 1
- Directed by: Graeme Harper
- Written by: Steve Pemberton; Reece Shearsmith
- Editing by: Joe Randall-Cutler
- Original air date: 27 December 2016

Guest appearances
- Rula Lenska as Celia; Jessica Raine as Kathy; George Bedford as Toby; Derek Jacobi as Dennis Fulcher; Cavan Clerkin as the unnamed interviewer; Naz Osmanoglu as the young Dennis Fulcher

Episode chronology
← Previous "Séance Time"	Next → "The Bill"

"The Devil of Christmas" is a Christmas special of the British dark comedy anthology television programme Inside No. 9, and the first episode of the third series. It was first aired on 27 December 2016 on BBC Two. The episode was directed by Graeme Harper and written by Reece Shearsmith and Steve Pemberton. Stylistically, it took heavy inspiration from classic 1970s anthology programmes, such as Beasts, Thriller, Tales of the Unexpected and Armchair Thriller, and was filmed using authentic equipment. Pemberton intended the episode to be a recreation of this kind of classic programming, with critics characterising it as a homage, pastiche or loving parody.

"The Devil of Christmas", which is set in December 1977, begins with an English family (played by Pemberton, Rula Lenska, Jessica Raine and George Bedford) arriving at an Austrian Alpine chalet, where their guide (played by Shearsmith) tells them the story of the Krampus. It shortly becomes apparent, however, that viewers are watching a film, and a director (voiced by Derek Jacobi) provides commentary on the events. The critical reception of "The Devil of Christmas" was very strong, with praise directed at the writing, acting and production, with some considering it the best episode of Inside No. 9. As a recreation of 1970s anthology programmes, it was considered a success. The ending, critics noted, was extremely dark; though many offered considerable praise for the final twist, a minority criticised it as gratuitously unpleasant.

== Plot ==
External videos
- "Arrival"; Julian, Celia, Kathy and Toby share their first impressions of the chalet.
- "On the Third Night"; Klaus tells Julian, Celia, Kathy and Toby the story of the Krampus; on the voiceover, Dennis Fulcher shares his view.

The episode opens with a VT clock slate for a film named The Devil of Christmas. Set in December 1977, the film follows Julian, his pregnant wife Kathy, his mother Celia and his son Toby as they are shown into an Austrian Alpine chalet by Klaus. The party discuss their plans until Toby is struck by an unpleasant painting of the Krampus on the wall.

In a voiceover, the film's director Dennis Fulcher talks to another man about the making of the film, in the style of an audio commentary. The video is rewound so Dennis can comment on a continuity error. He continues to discuss the film over the remainder of the episode, including commenting on the way that "Celia" misses her marks and fluffs her lines, and the way "Julian" says his lines too quickly in his eagerness to get to another job.

Klaus tells of the Krampus, unnerving Kathy. Before bed, Toby leaves out his boots for the Krampus, and Kathy empties a bottle of tablets. The next morning, Toby's boots are filled with switches, indicating—according to Klaus's story—that he has been visited by the Krampus due to his naughtiness. Celia suspects Kathy, who is not Toby's mother, but Julian rebukes her. At dinner, Toby tells of the wonderful day he has had with Klaus. Toby heads to bed, and Kathy speculates that Toby was sleepwalking the night before, becoming agitated when Julian and Celia are unconvinced. That night, both Toby and Celia are out of bed, and the figure of the Krampus is seen. The next day, scratches are found on Toby's body, and Celia leaves with the child.

That night, Julian finds that Kathy has scratches on her back, and the pair discover that her boots are stuffed with switches. Julian later finds Kathy downstairs. Celia calls to say she and Toby are safely home, and Kathy admits that her child is not Julian's. The Krampus snatches her, and Julian keels over, clutching his heart. He needs his medication, but Kathy watches him die, holding his empty pill bottle for him to see. "The Krampus" is revealed to be Klaus in a costume, but Klaus then removes a fake moustache and drops his accent; he is Simon, Kathy's lover.

Fulcher explains that there is a final scene. The actors ready, and the scene begins: Kathy is on a bed, and pours Champagne. She is joined by Simon, still half-costumed, who chains her to the bed. Simon claims to be Krampus, and the scene ends with Kathy screaming as "Krampus" cackles. The actor playing "Krampus" leaves, with the actress playing Kathy believing the filming is over. The cameras keep rolling as plastic sheeting is put under "Kathy" by two stagehands for a scene that was not in the script. Another actor is dressed as the Krampus, and Kathy is roughly gagged by a stagehand. The new Krampus advances, armed with a machete; the older Dennis explains that "Kathy" understands what is about to happen, and that we are witnessing genuine fear. "Kathy" screams, and the tape cuts just as the machete is about to fall. Dennis says that he is surprised the tape has surfaced again, but says it was "one of the better ones"; The Devil of Christmas, unbeknownst to the main cast, was a snuff film. Dennis's interviewer then terminates the police interrogation.

== Production ==
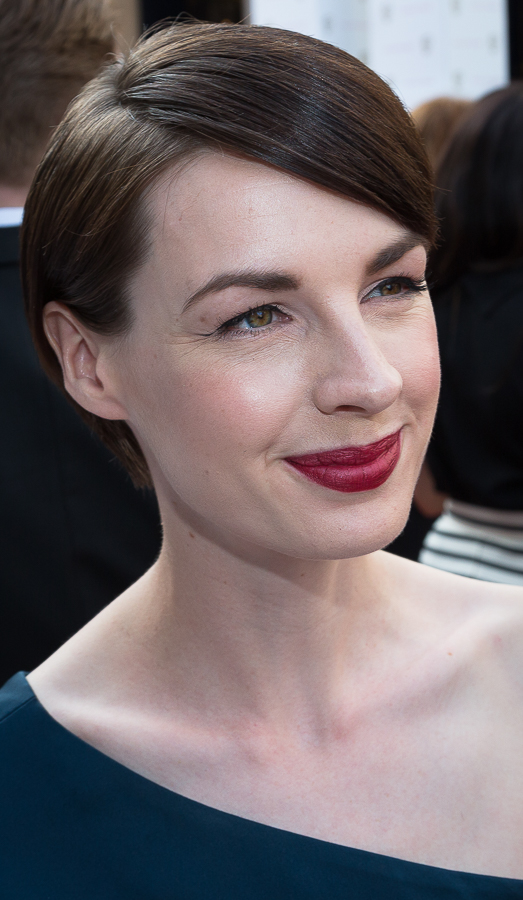
Jessica Raine (pictured, 2015) starred in the episode as Kathy.

The second series of Inside No. 9 aired from 26 March to 29 April 2015. In May, Shearsmith said that he and Pemberton had talked about doing a third series, and were hopeful that they would be able to, but that the BBC had not yet requested one. A third series was confirmed by the BBC in October 2015. Further information, including hints at settings and confirmed performers, was released in January 2016, when the series began filming. "The Devil of Christmas", the first episode of this third series, was released as a Christmas special in December 2016, with the remainder of the series following in 2017.

The episode can be understood as a part of the tradition of Christmas ghost stories, which includes the works of Charles Dickens and the BBC's A Ghost Story for Christmas series. The inspiration for the use of the Krampus myth came from Pemberton's reading, while stylistic influence, according to Pemberton, came from "old '70s style" episodes of Beasts, Thriller and Tales of the Unexpected. For Pemberton, the 1970s style of the episode was a literal representation of what, metaphorically speaking, Inside No. 9 had been doing since the first series.

The episode was variously described as a recreation or re-enactment of this source material, or else as a homage, a pastiche a "loving, but merciless" parody, or spoof of it. In addition to those influences mentioned by the writers, commentators identified Acorn Antiques, Psycho, Tales from the Crypt, Dead of Night, Whistle and I'll Come to You, and Garth Marenghi's Darkplace as potential influences.

"The Devil of Christmas" was filmed "in the style of a '70s portmanteau horror episode". This entailed the use of non-standard methods and technologies. The whole filming process took only two days, with the cast taking minimal breaks between shoots. For the actors, it was thus more like appearing in a play than a typical 21st century television filming experience.

The episode was filmed on a set constructed at Studio D in the BBC Elstree Centre, run by BBC Studioworks, and authentic 1970s costumes and props were rented for the filming. The studio was retrofitted with cameras and lighting equipment that would have been used on a 1970s set, including three Ikegami HK 323 cameras and a single Ikegami HK323P camera, all provided by a company called Golden Age Recreations. The filming of the episode thus differed from the series's usual single-camera setup approach. Adam Tandy, Inside No. 9's producer, said that "Studio D has the heritage and familiar atmosphere that I remember from when I worked at Elstree in the 1980s; however, a lot of modernisation has taken place since then and this has allowed us to monitor our 4:3 625-line PAL pictures in BBC Studioworks' state of the art HD production gallery." For Shearsmith, the result was that "it looks shit, but it's brilliant".

The episode was directed by Graeme Harper, a veteran television director known for his work on Doctor Who. As each episode of Inside No. 9 features new characters, the writers were able to attract actors who might have been unwilling to commit to an entire series. "The Devil of Christmas" stars Shearsmith as Klaus, Pemberton as Julian, Rula Lenska as Celia, Jessica Raine as Kathy, George Bedford as Toby, Derek Jacobi as Dennis Fulcher, Cavan Clerkin as the unnamed interviewer, and Naz Osmanoglu as the young Dennis Fulcher.

== Reception ==
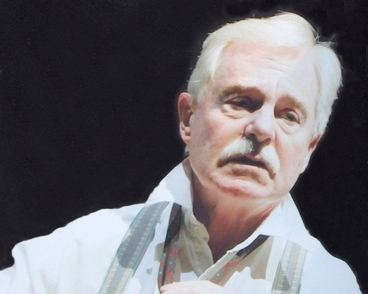
Derek Jacobi (pictured, 2006) provided the voice of Dennis Fulcher, but does not appear on-camera. His commentary provided much of the episode's humour.

For the most part, critics responded extremely positively to "The Devil of Christmas"; it was awarded five out of five stars by Adam White of The Telegraph, four out of five stars by James Jackson of The Times, and selected as "pick of the day" by Gerard Gilbert of i. It was praised as a fitting start to the series and as an entertaining Christmas special in its own right. Critics described it as "sublime" and "a treat"; it came "highly recommended" from the comedy critic Bruce Dessau, and the writer Matt Baylis summarised it as "horridly clever, wickedly good". Ian Hyland, writing for The Mirror in 2017, called it the most memorable television over the Christmas period. For him, the episode was almost as strong as "The 12 Days of Christine", in his view the best episode of Inside No. 9. Other critics did not place it as highly in comparison; Frances Taylor, writing for RadioTimes.com, listed "The Devil of Christmas" as the seventh best of the first 13 episodes.

Both the comedic and horrific elements of the episode were praised. For White, the episode was "a demented, finely-honed comedy", though for Sally Newall, of The Independent, the comedic elements were less prominent. She described it as a "deliciously dark ... masterclass in the twisted, unsettling stuff that the League of Gentlemen and Psychoville creators do so well", but claimed that "a growing sense of doom" was more prevalent than "belly laughs". Dessau, too, commented on the lack of humour, while Chris Bennion, writing for the Saturday Review (of The Times) described it as "laugh-out-loud hilarious", while nonetheless "the stuff of nightmares". For White, much of the episode's strongest humour came from Dennis Fulcher's voice-over; Jackson called this a "pitch-perfect parody of a DVD commentary".

Critics praised the cast for their hamming and effective delivery of what Bennion called the "stilted, stagy dialogue"; Toby Dantzic, writing for The Telegraph's Saturday Review, called the acting "stellar". The attention to detail by the cast and crew was widely praised; the "dated styling" was, for Jackson, "spot on". Louisa Mellor, of the entertainment website Den of Geek, explained that "from the aspect ratio to the music, title font, sets, lighting, camera moves, hair, make-up and costume... everything was recognisable from the sort of 1970s television plays that, when you think about it, may have provided inspiration for Inside No. 9 as a whole". For her, "the retro send-up provided enough entertainment on its own—these days you have to be very good to make TV that bad". White, similarly, argued that "it's a gargantuan, incredibly precise task to make such gloriously terrible TV, a skill reserved for only the greatest of comics". Even despite the flaws of the film within the episode, Rebecca Nicholson, of The Guardian, found it "relatively gripping". Sarah Hughes, writing in i, compared "The Devil of Christmas" to an episode of Tales of the Unexpected; it was she, argued, "both an immaculately conceived homage to Roald Dahl's original anthology series and a worthy contender for its crown".

Commentators noted that the ending was genuinely unsettling and dark. Rachel Aroesti, writing for The Guardian, described the episode as moving "from a twee period piece to what has to be the most depraved half-hour of television ever to grace the festive schedules". For many critics, the final twist was praiseworthy; it was characterised variously as the episode's "secret weapon", "very fitting", "suitably macabre", and "fantastically nasty". For Hughes, it "was a lovely sting in the tale, and one of which Dahl would almost certainly have approved". Two reviews in The Times, however—one unsigned, and one by Matt Rudd—were more critical. The unsigned review advised viewers to switch off before the end, as "the fabulous styling gives way to a gratuitously nasty conclusion, a bad misjudgment from such a talented writing team". For Rudd, the shocking ending served no purpose; critical of "shocking for the sake of shocking", he argued that the episode's "half-hour of self-satisfied 1970s pastiche followed by a frenzied knife attack is very unpleasant indeed". In i, an unsigned review of "The Bill"—the second episode of the third series—suggested that viewers may have been put off the programme by the "rather nasty final couple of minutes" of "The Devil of Christmas".

Though Jackson considered the ending "overwrought", he felt that it "pulled the rug"; "turning on a sixpence, the screams of 'Kathy' turned truly horrifying; the tackiness suddenly real and disturbing". Mellor considered the ending "a terrific twist as long as you didn't look at it too closely", arguing that the interviewer's patience and the crew's collusion were unlikely. However, she suggested, there is little to be gained by criticising these aspects of the episode. For Baylis, the ending was unexpected, revealing "darkness of the shabby human kind". In the closing seconds of the episode, he said, "we suddenly saw it all, without seeing anything".
