= Bruce Dessau =

British arts critic

- Occupations: Journalist and author

Bruce Dessau is a British arts critic and biographer who writes for the London Evening Standard and other publications, as well as his own website BeyondTheJoke.co.uk.

He is the author of biographies of Rowan Atkinson and George Michael, as well as Beyond a Joke (2011), a non-fiction book about the private lives of comedians and the difficulties in the comedy industry.
