= Cold Comfort (Inside No. 9) =

- Inside No. 9 episode
- Episode poster, featuring Steve Pemberton as Andy, Reece Shearsmith as George, Jane Horrocks as Liz and Nikki Amuka-Bird as Joanne
- Episode no.: Series 2 Episode 4
- Directed by: Steve Pemberton; Reece Shearsmith
- Written by: Pemberton; Shearsmith
- Story by: Reece Shearsmith and Steve Pemberton
- Editing by: Joe Randall-Cutler
- Original air date: 16 April 2015
- Running time: 30 minutes

Guest appearances
- Jane Horrocks as Liz; Nikki Amuka-Bird as Joanne; Tony Way as Michael; Vilma Hollingbery as a caller; Edward Easton as a caller; Kath Hughes as a caller; James Meehan as a caller; Vicky Hall as a caller

Episode chronology
← Previous "The Trial of Elizabeth Gadge"	Next → "Nana's Party"

"Cold Comfort" is the fourth episode of the second series of the British dark comedy anthology television programme Inside No. 9. The episode, which was written and directed by Steve Pemberton and Reece Shearsmith, was first broadcast on 16 April 2015 on BBC Two. Most of "Cold Comfort" is composed of a stream from a fixed camera on the desk of Andy, the protagonist, with smaller pictures on the side of the screen, in the style of a CCTV feed. "Cold Comfort" was filmed over two and a half days in Twickenham, and was (akin to "A Quiet Night In" of Inside No. 9's first series), highly experimental. The episode was Pemberton and Shearsmith's directorial debut.

The episode starred Pemberton, Shearsmith, Jane Horrocks, Nikki Amuka-Bird and Tony Way as volunteers at Comfort Support Line, a (fictional) crisis hotline. The story follows Andy (Pemberton), who is starting at the call centre. After taking a particularly disturbing call from Chloe, a suicidal teenage girl, Andy begins to struggle, but he is offered support by his supervisor George (Shearsmith), the gossipy Liz (Horrocks) and the officious Joanne (Amuka-Bird). Andy is later joined by Michael (Way).

Vilma Hollingbery, Vicky Hall and members of the comedy group Gein's Family Giftshop (Edward Easton, Kath Hughes and James Meehan) voiced various callers to the crisis hotline, with the Gein's Family Giftshop comedians also appearing as on-screen extras, playing unnamed call centre volunteers.

The television critics Andrew Billen and David Chater (both writing for The Times) characterised "Cold Comfort" as somewhat weaker than other episodes of the series, but other critics, including Patrick Mulkern (writing for Radio Times), the comedy critic Bruce Dessau, and writers for The Sunday Times reviewed the episode positively. Commentators praised the format, the writing and the performances, especially Horrocks's, but offered differing views about the episode's conclusion, plot and atmosphere.

== Production ==
The second series of Inside No. 9 was written in 2014, and then filmed from the end of 2014 into early 2015. The idea for "Cold Comfort" began with the call centre, with Pemberton having kept a newspaper article on the subject from 2005 as a potential inspiration. Once the writers had the idea for the setting, they allowed the story to grow out of this. The pair visited a large number of locations—including a number of colleges—before settling on the one used, which was in Twickenham, rejecting many because they did not look enough like offices. They had three days at the location, but completed filming in two and a half.

=== Casting ===
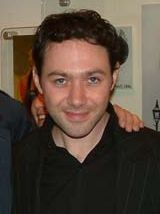
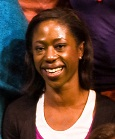
"Cold Comfort" was cowritten and codirected by Reece Shearsmith (left, pictured in 2003). He starred as George, alongside Nikki Amuka-Bird (right, pictured in 2010), who played Joanne.

"Cold Comfort" stars Pemberton as Andy, a new volunteer, and Shearsmith as George, Andy's supervisor. According to Shearsmith, he and Pemberton do not typically write Inside No. 9 scripts with particular actors in mind for roles, and nor do they typically write roles specifically for themselves. They were unsure, for a long time, on which characters they should take, initially considering having Shearsmith play Andy and Pemberton play George. Shearsmith said that this felt like the more "obvious" option, but the characters were switched as they "thought it would be slightly more unusual" to have it that way around.

As each episode of Inside No. 9 features new characters, the writers were able to attract actors who might have been unwilling to commit to an entire series. Jane Horrocks, Nikki Amuka-Bird and Tony Way feature respectively as Liz, Joanne and Michael, other volunteers at the call centre. The characters of Liz and Joanne have strongly differing approaches to their roles as volunteers, with Joanne focussing on detachment and Liz on involvement. Both approaches, for Pemberton, have advantages and disadvantages. Liz's desk is adorned with various trinkets, including ornaments and pictures. These were Horrocks's idea, and, for Pemberton and Shearsmith, served to make viewers suspicious of her from the start. Horrocks was chosen because she would be able to add humour while still keeping to the tight timings necessary for the episode; many of her lines were improvised. The character of Michael begins to work at the centre during the episode. Pemberton and Shearsmith considered having it mentioned that he had been sent by "Pauline from Wood Green", a reference to the stage version of The League of Gentlemen's Pauline, who had been based at Wood Green. However, this was not included in the final episode.

Edward Easton, Vilma Hollingbery, Kath Hughes, James Meehan and Vicky Hall provide the voices of various people who call in to the centre. Some of the voice actors were drawn from the comedy group Gein's Family Giftshop, the performing members of which are Hughes, Easton and Meehan. After watching a Gein's Family Giftshop performance, Pemberton and Shearsmith had invited the members to star in Inside No. 9. The comedians then suggested that they also appear on-screen as extras, playing unnamed call centre volunteers. Hollingberry, who voiced "Ivy", an old woman caller, had previously starred in Pemberton and Shearsmith's Psychoville as Mrs Wren/Mrs Ladybirdface. She was one of the few actors whom Pemberton and Shearsmith used in both series.

=== Direction ===
Pemberton and Shearsmith, in addition to writing and starring in "Cold Comfort", directed the episode. This episode—one of two in the second series that they jointly directed—was their directorial debut. The pair did not know, while writing for the series, which episodes they would be directing, meaning that their writing was unlikely to be influenced by the knowledge. Pemberton and Shearsmith had always intended to try directing, and the second series of Inside No. 9 offered them the opportunity. David Kerr, who had directed all of the episodes in the first series, was unable to return for the second. Guillem Morales and Dan Zeff each took on directorial duties for two episodes, while Pemberton and Shearsmith decided to direct the remaining two.

Shearsmith said in an interview that the pair had considered directing episodes in which they did not appear much, but scheduling concerns left them with "Cold Comfort" and "Nana's Party"; episodes which feature the writers quite heavily. By contrast, Pemberton said that he and Shearsmith, knowing that they were going to be directing two episodes, deliberately chose "Cold Comfort" because the fixed cameras made filming a lot simpler, though Shearsmith said that the filming was more complex than they initially anticipated. For Horrocks, it was "lovely to be directed" by Pemberton and Shearsmith, as she "really [liked] their choices and ... [loves] their work". Shearsmith said that he found directing the episode "exhausting"; he found little time to rest during filming, as if he was not directly involved in filming, he was involved in making directorial decisions.

=== Picture and sound ===
Most of "Cold Comfort" is made up of the streams for four fixed cameras in the style of a CCTV feed. Here, Andy talks on the phone to "Chloe" (main camera and bottom right) while George sits in his office (top right) and Liz leaves the workspace (centre right). The date is visible in the bottom left.

The episode progresses mostly through footage streamed from a fixed camera in booth nine of the call centre setting. Streams from other cameras are displayed on the side of the screen, in the style of a CCTV feed. The idea was inspired by a clip of the interview of Russ Williams with the Canadian Police, which Shearsmith had seen online; this, too, had a main feed with three smaller feeds giving different views of the scene. The writers felt that the multiple screens both served a narrative function and raised the tension. For much of the episode, viewers simply watch characters taking calls. Extras are seen moving back and forth in the smaller screens, with Pemberton having initially been keen for things to be happening away from the main feed. However, he was somewhat frustrated with the result, with the same extra moving on numerous occasions throughout the episode. Shearsmith felt that a whole series filmed in the same manner "would be a bit wearing on the eye", but that the style could be used for a single episode.

The format presented certain technical difficulties. The episode was filmed in very long takes—some as long as five or six minutes—without any cuts. This meant that the actors could not make any errors, but the result was "something you don't normally see". Pemberton said that the episode would "either be brilliantly tense or incredibly boring". Timing during filming had to be precise, though scenes could be cut earlier or start later than was anticipated. For example, an earlier introduction of Joanne was cut in the final episode. Other unused versions of scenes included a more violent version of George's attack on Liz and a version of the final scene with a gunshot. The gunshot was removed on the recommendation of Jon Plowman, Inside No. 9's executive producer, which led to some debate; Shearsmith, for example, preferred the original version.

Alex Thompson, the episode's sound recordist, arranged the phones so that the actors could speak to each other in real-time. Pemberton and Shearsmith wanted this so that the voices would not have to be recorded in a studio later and added in ADR. The voice of "Chloe"—the identity of whom is key to the story—presented a particular technical challenge, as the writers wanted to ensure that her identity was not revealed the first time her voice is heard. First, the production team recorded Shearsmith playing George-as-Chloe, and then a number of actresses recorded their versions of Shearsmith playing George-as-Chloe. Of these, one—Hall—was chosen to lend her voice to Chloe. Shearsmith then re-recorded his voice, imitating Hall's version of George-as-Chloe. Hall and Shearsmith's respective performances of George-as-Chloe could then be merged for the final episode. The first time viewers hear "Chloe", her voice is mostly Hall's; as the episode progresses, more of Shearsmith's voice is audible. For Shearsmith, this did not represent the production team cheating the viewers, as viewers' experiences are filtered through Andy's experiences. The first time viewers hear Chloe, they—like Andy—experience her as a teenage girl. As most of the episode was filmed in real-time, George is visible making calls as Chloe, meaning that he hides in plain sight. Footage of Shearsmith playing George-as-Chloe in George's office—used in the episode's final—was filmed separately to the rest of the episode, as a camera set-up in George's office would have been visible on one of the main cameras.

Pemberton compared "Cold Comfort" to "A Quiet Night In", the second episode of the first series of Inside No. 9, a sentiment echoed by some critics. Both episodes were highly experimental—"A Quiet Night In" being mostly silent and "Cold Comfort" being filmed mostly from a fixed camera—something which the writers felt suits anthology format. On the other hand, according to Pemberton, as "Cold Comfort" is "static and all about listening", it is, in a sense, the "polar opposite" of "A Quiet Night In". Though all episodes in the series were very different in tone, Pemberton felt that "Cold Comfort" was "the most extreme experiment".

== Plot ==
External videos
- "Comfort Support Line"; George introduces Andy to his workstation amid quips from Liz.

Andy starts to volunteer at the Comfort Support Line (CSL), a crisis hotline, after the death of his sister. His supervisor George takes him through the procedure for calls, and Andy chats to the more experienced Liz. He finds his first few calls difficult, and Joanne, a volunteer who shares a mutual distaste with Liz, advises him not to get emotionally invested in the callers. Andy takes a call from Chloe, a 16-year-old girl with problems at home. Chloe says that she has taken a drug overdose, and Andy sings "Shine" by Take That to her, but, when he finishes, Chloe is no longer on the line. He immediately takes a call from an elderly woman distraught that one of her cats has died, but responds insensitively, and hangs up.

The following day, George thinks Liz is breaking the rules by taking a personal call; he gets angry and wrestles the handset from her. Later, Andy is upset that he listened to Chloe in her final moments, and Liz, who has made a complaint about George's conduct, tells him that she took a call from an ex-soldier, in tears because his mother committed suicide following the death of her cat. Andy realises that the man's mother is the caller from the previous night. George advises that Andy will not face any repercussions, and asks Andy to help Michael, new to the centre, with his first call. Chloe calls in and speaks to Michael, again claiming that she has taken an overdose. Andy snatches the phone and shouts at Chloe, hanging up on her.

Following her argument with George, Liz is asked to leave CSL, and a small party is held in the workspace. During the party, Chloe calls the helpline again, asking to speak to Andy. Andy tells Chloe that her hoax call caused an old woman's death, but Chloe says that this was Andy's fault. She repeats what Andy had said to the old woman about her cat. Andy stays late in his cubicle and goes to George's office, realising that "Chloe" must be someone who works at CSL. He accuses Joanne, who has just arrived, but she says she came back for her bag. He plans to get evidence from the CCTV footage and contact the police. Looking through CCTV footage, he and Joanne discover that it is George who made the calls. Unbeknownst to them, George is approaching the office; he hastily leaves when he sees Andy and Joanne inside.

George does not arrive for work the next day. Joanne shows in a new volunteer, Glen, who is replacing Liz. Having found out that George has made similar calls to CSL for years, Andy plans to go to the police. Andy answers the phone, and it is George. In Chloe's voice, George says that he just wanted someone to listen to him, then warns that he has told the dead woman's son where Andy works. In the background, Glen stands, and points a gun at Andy's head. He calls Andy's name, and Andy turns around to see Glen right before the credits play.

== Reception ==
Critics responded positively to "Cold Comfort", though several characterised it as weaker than previous episodes in the series. David Chater, writing in The Times, described "Cold Comfort" as "a breather" after the "small masterpieces" of "The Trial of Elizabeth Gadge" and "The 12 Days of Christine". He said that "Cold Comfort" offers "a promising set-up, but ... doesn't unfold with the same simple, logical elegance as others in the series". Andrew Billen, also writing for The Times, gave the episode three out of five stars, considering it weaker than is typical for Inside No. 9. John Robinson, who reviewed the episode for The Guardian, felt that though "the episode has the tools to ratchet up the suspense", it "lacks both the plausibility and element of surprise that characterise the best of this series". Frances Taylor, writing for Radio Times, listed it as the tenth best of the first thirteen episodes. Though praising the "innovative" filming and "darkly-brilliant script", she considered the ending "a little bit ridiculous".

Patrick Mulkern, on the other hand, who was writing for the Radio Times, described "Cold Comfort" as "warped brilliance". He said that "any real helpline volunteers watching this episode may well wince, but it remains gripping throughout". Reviewers in The Sunday Times called the episode "another corker", and the freelance journalist Dan Owen called the episode "easily the funniest" since "La Couchette", awarding it three out of four stars. He characterised it as mostly successful in its aims, and summarised it as a "memorable" and "well-executed" comedy-drama.

Robinson felt that the writers had "dial[ed] back the celebrity guests" for the episode, while Phoebe-Jane Boyd, writing for the entertainment website Den of Geek, said that the episode "had another set of fantastic guest stars". The comedy critic Bruce Dessau praised the performances in the episode; Billen said that Horrocks's performance was "particularly good", and critics in The Sunday Times said that Horrocks was "on fine form". Commentators also commended the episode's writing, though Owen felt that the plot took a while to "get going".

The television critic Julia Raeside discussed the unusual style of "Cold Comfort", saying that "You could argue [that the writers] are at the stage in their careers where they don't need to experiment. No one else makes television like them and yet still they push themselves." For Claire Murphy, writing in the Daily Mirror, the episode "makes great use of CCTV split-screen footage". Dessau said that the set-up gave the episode "its haunting flavour". Viewers do not just see Andy, but also streams from other cameras, which, for Dessau, "makes the viewer both intrigued and anxious". Boyd, too, claimed that the episode played on the "inherent creepiness" of CCTV footage. She said that the split-screen set-up increased the tension, and that the "gimmick is a good one"; though it could "have worked well as a pleasing novelty on its own, [it] also makes this 'whodunit'/'who's doing it' a refreshingly inventive take on the genre".

Critics writing for The Sunday Times said that set-up "proves very effective for the denouement", which Mulkern described as "a creepy pay-off". Chris Bennion of The Independent said that the ending was testament to the fact that the writers "know how to play their audience like a fiddle". Billen was less impressed, saying that "the ultimate twist in the tale was crude, and the insight that those who offer help need it most just a little banal - by this series' standards, at least". Owen, similarly, found the motives of "Chloe" unconvincing, and considered "the surprisingly nihilistic final shot perhaps not fully earned or plausible", but confessed that the episode was able to "outmanoeuvre" him, as he did not foresee the ending.
