= Wings of Love =

Wings of Love may refer to:

== Albums ==
- Wings of Love (The Temptations album), 1976
- Wings of Love (Fish Leong album), 2004
- Wings of Love (Nova album), 1977
- Wings of Love, by Olsen Brothers, 2000
- Wings of Love, by Shuggie Otis, 2013

== Songs ==
- "Wings of Love" (Liv song). 2016
- "Wings of Love", by Andy Taylor from the American Anthem film soundtrack
- "Wings of Love", by April Wine from The Whole World's Goin' Crazy
- "Wings of Love", by Arisa Mizuki from Arisa II: Shake Your Body for Me
- "Wings of Love", by Carole King from Welcome Home
- "Wings of Love", by Level 42 from The Early Tapes
- "Wings of Love", by Nino Tempo & April Stevens
- "Wings of Love", by Nirvana from The Story of Simon Simopath
- "Wings of Love", by Reset
- "Wings of Love", by Scoop
- "Wings of Love", by Žagar

== Other uses ==
- Wings of Love (Pearson), a c. 1972 painting by Stephen Pearson
- Bana Sevmeyi Anlat (English: Wings of Love), a Turkish television series
- "Wings of Love", a 1929–1930 series of Hearst Sunday newspaper magazine covers by Russell Patterson
- Wings of Love Foundation, a non-profit organization operated by Monkey Jungle, Miami, Florida, US

== See also ==
- On the Wings of Love (disambiguation)
