= Nana's Party =

- Inside No. 9 episode
- "Nana's Party" episode poster, featuring (from left to right) Lorraine Ashbourne as Carol, Elsie Kelly as Maggie, Claire Skinner as Angela, Reece Shearsmith as Pat and Steve Pemberton as Jim.
- Episode no.: Series 2 Episode 5
- Directed by: Pemberton; Shearsmith
- Written by: Pemberton; Shearsmith
- Editing by: Joe Randall-Cutler
- Original air date: 23 April 2015
- Running time: 30 minutes

Guest appearances
- Claire Skinner as Angela; Eve Gordon as Katie; Elsie Kelly as Maggie; Lorraine Ashbourne as Carol; Christopher Whitlow as a paramedic

Episode chronology
| ← Previous "Cold Comfort" | Next → "Séance Time" |

"Nana's Party" is the fifth episode of the second series of the British dark comedy anthology television programme Inside No. 9. It was first broadcast on 23 April 2015 on BBC Two. Written and directed by Steve Pemberton and Reece Shearsmith, the episode starred Claire Skinner as the obsessive-compulsive and aspirational Angela, who is hosting a party for the 79th birthday of her mother Maggie, played by Elsie Kelly. Angela's husband Jim, played by Pemberton, is keen to play a prank on Pat, Angela's brother-in-law, who is a practical joker. Pat is played by Shearsmith, while Carol, a recovering alcoholic who is Pat's wife and Angela's sister, is played by Lorraine Ashbourne. The episode also features Eve Gordon as Katie, Angela and Jim's teenage daughter, and Christopher Whitlow as a paramedic seen at the beginning and end of the episode.

Much of the episode's plot revolves around a practical joke with a fake cake that Jim has set up in an attempt to fool Pat. Moving the cake reveals the head of the person hiding under the table, but, in the meantime, the hidden character can hear conversations taking place nearby, unbeknownst to those who are not in on the joke. The episode plays on viewers' guesses as to what has led to the arrival—seen at the opening of the episode—of a paramedic. In particular, the person under the table is at risk of injury if candles burn down or someone puts a knife into the "cake".

"Nana's Party" was the first episode of Inside No. 9 to be written, but it was shelved when BBC executives instead suggested that it worked as the first episode of a sitcom. Pemberton and Shearsmith revisited and modified the script during the writing process for Inside No. 9's second series. The writers aimed for a feeling of suburban darkness reminiscent of the work of the playwright Alan Ayckbourn, while commentators compared the episode to the work of the playwright and screenwriter Mike Leigh, particularly the play Abigail's Party. The story addresses themes including alcoholism, extramarital affairs, aging and social class. Television critics responded positively to "Nana's Party", which was praised as a typically-strong instalment of Inside No. 9. Particular praise was directed towards the writing and performances, especially Skinner's performance as Angela, Ashbourne's performance as Carol and Shearsmith's performance as Pat.

== Production ==
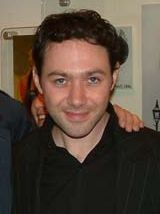
Reece Shearsmith (pictured in 2003) co-wrote, co-directed and starred in the episode with Steve Pemberton.

=== Writing ===
"Nana's Party" was the first episode of Inside No. 9 to be written by the programme's creators Reece Shearsmith and Steve Pemberton. BBC producers felt the episode worked as the opening episode of a sitcom, but Pemberton and Shearsmith were not happy to develop the idea into its own series, given the events of the plot. As such, the script was shelved, and revisited during planning for Inside No. 9's second series. A number of changes were made from the original script when the concept was revisited. For example, a paramedic was added to the opening scene in order to add a sense of danger and foreboding, and the character Angela's "borderline OCD" was accentuated.

Shearsmith said that the episode's focus on a grandmother's birthday party felt "domestic" and "homely". Pemberton, too, called it a "domestic" story, describing it as playing upon the classic British plot device of a family party going wrong. Shearsmith suggested that the pleasant house did give the episode the feel of a sitcom, but said that the story went somewhere "darker" than a typical sitcom would. With "Nana's Party", the writers wanted to produce something "dark" and "suburban", with Pemberton citing the playwright Alan Ayckbourn as an influence. Indeed, at the time the episode was written, Shearsmith was starring in an adaptation of Ayckbourn's play Absent Friends.

The writers intended to play off the idea of a hidden character being able to hear conversations revealing secrets. An initial idea of Pemberton's was to have a large parcel on a table at the birthday party, but with Maggie—on whose birthday the episode would be set—absent. Other characters would repeatedly ask where Maggie was, until it was revealed that her head was in the parcel. This idea developed into the possibility of a hollow cake hiding a character, a device used in the final episode. For the writers, there is humour in characters spending time talking earnestly to a cake; they noted that the prop cake had features resembling a face. In the editing stage, the production team kept reintroducing the cake in order to remind viewers of its presence. The original script ended with a knife being plunged into a fake cake followed by the revelation, contrary to viewers' expectations, that no one was under it at the time; instead, the writers upped the drama in the story, making it possible that any of the characters could be injured. For the writers, the original plot was, in a sense, darker, as some characters got away with wrongdoing in a way they do not in the final version.

=== Casting and characters ===
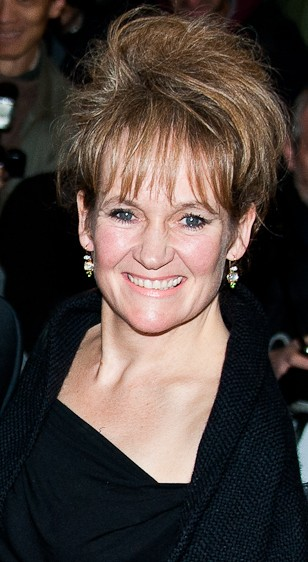
Lorraine Ashbourne (pictured in 2013) played Carol, Angela's sister.

As each episode of Inside No. 9 features new characters, the writers were able to attract actors who might have been unwilling to commit to an entire series. "Nana's Party" featured Claire Skinner as Angela, who is hosting a party. Pemberton and Shearsmith lived close to Skinner, but they had not properly met. She was one of several members of the cast of the film Life Is Sweet (others being Alison Steadman and Jane Horrocks) who have starred in Inside No. 9. Skinner enjoyed the "funny" script and her "nice" character. Eve Gordon (trained at the Nottingham Television Workshop) starred as Angela's daughter Katie, and Pemberton starred as Angela's husband Jim. Pemberton and Shearsmith suggested that Pemberton's costume made him look like Mr Chow Mein, a Benny Hill character.

Elsie Kelly played Angela's mother Maggie, on whose birthday the episode is set. The part was not written with anyone in mind, though Pemberton already knew Kelly well from their time together on the sitcom Benidorm. Lorraine Ashbourne played Angela's sister Carol, and Pat, Carol's husband, was played by Shearsmith. Carol was Pemberton's favourite character in the whole series; Shearsmith worried that an actor may not portray the character as they had hoped, but was very happy with Ashbourne's performance. Ashbourne said she was "thrilled" to be working with Pemberton and Shearsmith, for whom she had great admiration. She described the character of Carol as "hilarious", characterising her as "sexually frustrated" and "sad". To reflect Carol's alcoholism, Ashbourne swilled whiskey around her mouth before filming. Shearsmith wore a red wig to play Pat, something he had never done before. His skin-tone needed to be changed to match the hair, necessitating a white spray on his face every morning. In order not to give the impression that Pat was a thief or murderer (rather than simply a practical joker), Shearsmith was directed to chuckle while Pat set up his jokes. Christopher Whitlow plays a paramedic seen at the beginning and end of the episode. The scene featuring the paramedic at the end of the episode was longer in the final cut than had been initially intended in order to show more of the character's actions.

=== Filming and direction ===
The second series of Inside No. 9 was filmed from the end of 2014 into early 2015. "Nana's Party" was filmed in January, and was the final episode of the second series to be filmed. The writers saw a number of houses before selecting the one used in the episode; they wanted an open plan home to allow for easy movement between rooms. The one chosen was close to Twickenham Studios. A "deckhouse" was added to the house's garden; despite there already being two sheds, neither would have been visible on-screen. A new one was thus added. The executive producer Adam Tandy suggested that deckhouse would be preferable to shed, as the latter term suggested the site of something awful. Scenes in a bedroom used the room mostly as the production team found it. The room featured a number of books not seen on-screen, which reminded Shearsmith of a script (in the end not used for Inside No. 9's second series) of an episode set in a library. The front room had a buffet, including a prawn ring; by the third day of filming, this had begun to smell, and needed to be removed.

Pemberton and Shearsmith, in addition to writing and starring in "Nana's Party", directed the episode. This was the second episode they jointly directed in the second series after "Cold Comfort", their directorial debut. The pair did not know, while writing for the series, which episodes they would be directing, meaning that their writing was unlikely to be influenced by the knowledge. Pemberton and Shearsmith had always intended to try directing, and the second series of Inside No. 9 offered them the opportunity. David Kerr, who had directed all of the episodes in the first series, was unable to return for the second. Guillem Morales and Dan Zeff each took on directorial duties for two episodes, while Pemberton and Shearsmith decided to direct the remaining two. Shearsmith said in an interview that the pair had considered directing episodes in which they did not appear much, but scheduling concerns left them with "Cold Comfort" and "Nana's Party"; both episodes feature the writers quite heavily.

"Nana's Party" represented a directorial challenge insofar as Pemberton and Shearsmith were both on-screen for a relatively large amount of the episode. The pair took turns off-camera; on one day, Shearsmith acted and Pemberton watched, and the next day, the two switched; they were, however, tired, not least because it was the final episode of the series filmed. "Nana's Party" required more direction than "Cold Comfort", due in part to the larger number of actors. Pemberton and Shearsmith leaned strongly on Stephan Pehrsson, their cinematographer. While Pemberton and Shearsmith handled staging, Pehrsson handled cinematography.

== Plot ==
External videos
- "The cake" Jim (Pemberton) surprises Angela (Skinner), and tells her of his plan to play a prank on Pat

A paramedic is let into a house to the sounds of panic. Earlier, the fastidious Angela prepares to host a party for the 79th birthday of her mother, Maggie. Angela's daughter, Katie, heads to her room to complete her homework. When Angela moves a cake, she reveals the head of Jim, her husband. Jim plans to play a trick on Pat—a practical joker and the husband of Angela's sister, Carol (a recovering alcoholic)—by hiding under the cake. Maggie, Carol and Pat—the latter wearing a wolf mask—arrive at the house. As the three settle, Pat plugs in his mobile to charge—something Jim had asked Angela to prevent—and secretly places ice in a bucket. Carol privately drinks from a sunscreen bottle while ostensibly unblocking the toilet after her mother could not flush it. Angela is proud that the party food is from Marks's, but Carol mocks Angela's middle class affectations. Maggie wants a photograph with the food on the table, and Carol lights the cake's candles, which burn towards the flammable fake cake—under which Jim is still hiding. Katie greets her nana and aunt, with Maggie insisting that she tell the joke from Pat's card. Panicking, Angela blows out the candles. The room clears, and Jim is left frustrated.

Katie shows Maggie her tablet as the pair sit in the former's room. A visibly-drunk Carol enters and talks to Katie about the importance of having fun. Katie wants to finish her homework, but assures Carol that she would make a good mother. Downstairs, Jim persuades Angela to take up position under the table as Pat replaces the soap in the toilet. Pat joins Jim next to the table and returns a VHS; it becomes clear that Jim's apparent love for Countdown is actually a cover for his pornography habit, and Jim tries to steer the conversation away from the topic, worried that Angela will hear. Carol enters and puts on music. Pat sees Carol's sunscreen, and prepares her a drink of "Adam's ale". Carol aggressively flirts with Jim, who does not reciprocate. When Pat hands Carol water, she throws it in his face and he leaves. Carol confronts Jim about promises he made to her, and how this house should be hers, not Angela's. Jim remains terrified that Angela can hear the conversation.

Katie and Maggie enter. Maggie talks about Pat's "frozen willies"—novelty ice cubes—as a distressed Jim makes her a drink, and Carol dances with the uninterested Katie. Jim pulls Carol away from Katie, but Carol hits him; when Carol talks to Katie about becoming her stepmother, Jim shouts at her. Pat stops him, and, after Carol storms out, tells Jim that "he knows". Katie is distressed, and interrogates Jim as Maggie plunges a knife into the cake. Jim panics, believing Angela is still under the table, but Angela enters from the kitchen, and reveals that she left to buy a real cake—the story that Jim had told to cover her apparent absence. Katie wants to talk to her mother, but chaos ensues when Maggie chokes on an ice cube, which Pat reveals contains a fake spider. Carol enters, her face blackened by Pat's fake soap, and Pat, reaching for his charging phone to call the emergency services, receives an electric shock, his hands wet from the ice bucket. Angela performs the Heimlich manoeuvre on her mother; Carol kneels by Pat and shouts for help. The new cake is pushed into Jim's face by Katie, who then answers the door. The paramedic enters, then begins a striptease for Maggie to the Casualty theme. His performance, it is revealed, was Pat's present to Maggie. Later, Jim talks to an oblivious Maggie. He sees Angela and Katie come down the stairs with bags. In silence, he watches them leave as Maggie tells him the joke from Pat's birthday card.

== Analysis ==
"Forget about the past, you can't change it.
Forget about the future, you can't predict it.
Forget about the present, I didn't get you one!"

— Maggie repeats the joke from Pat's birthday card several times over the episode.

Plotlines following a birthday party in disarray are common, particularly in plays, and an episode with a similar theme was also included in the first series of Inside No. 9. "Nana's Party" revolves around the relatively mundane problems of alcoholism, affairs and aging. Class is another theme, with Angela, Jim and Katie representing a typical middle class family, while Maggie, Carol and Pat are more working class. David Chater, writing for The Times, said that "Nana's Party" was like "a more twisted version" of Abigail's Party, with several critics likening the episode to a Mike Leigh drama. Critics also saw the influence of Ayckbourn's work.

The episode's action revolves around the practical joke involving the cake and, in particular, viewers' attempts to guess what has caused injury, as they know that the paramedic will be coming. Both Angela and the alcoholic Carol are "ticking time-bomb[s]". Angela is the central character, and is similar to a more anxious version of Sue Brockman, Skinner's character from Outnumbered. She is stressed and obsessive-compulsive, but aspirational, fastidious, and dutiful. The comedy critic Bruce Dessau compared Ashbourne's characterisation of Carol to Elizabeth Taylor's characterisation in Who's Afraid of Virginia Woolf?; as the episode progresses, Carol becomes increasingly abusive. Commentators variously described Pat as "appalling", "tiresome", an "irritating tit" and "an insufferable booby". For Chris Bennion, writing in The Independent, Pat's character is more complex: "Behind Pat's cheesy jokes and schoolboy tomfoolery lies a desperately sad and dignified man, standing by and caring for a wife whose love for him has long gone." Pat and Carol, for Pemberton and Shearsmith, have a more honest relationship than Jim and Angela, despite the problems in their relationship.

Jim is Pat's "weary nemesis", and a "classic everyman". Jim and Pat, for Gerard Gilbert of i, are like "two suburban grotesques straight out of a Mike Leigh drama". Maggie is unaware of the chaos around her, instead distracted by the tablet—on which she plays a game somewhere between Clash of Clans and Minecraft—or retelling the birthday card joke. As a "Middle England suburban" comedy, "Nana's Party" is "all about the depths and heartaches lurking beneath apparently happy families". As the story progresses, the characters subvert expectations, with the irritating Pat revealed as a caring husband and the alcoholic Carol revealed as recovering from an unsuccessful affair. Pemberton and Shearsmith characterised the episode's ending as "downbeat" and lacking a twist, noting that "Nana's Party" is the only episode of the first two series of Inside No. 9 in which no character dies.

== Reception ==
Critics responded positively to "Nana's Party", with Patrick Mulkern of Radio Times calling it "another cracker", Chater characterising it as another "bullseye", and Julia Raeside and John Dugdale, writing in The Sunday Times, describing it as "another perfectly judged high-wire walk: comedy and tragedy balanced evenly and artfully at all times". Bennion called it "a tightly wound and hugely impressive half hour", and the freelance journalist Dan Owen called it "another great instalment" that "really worked" on its own terms.

The episode's writing was praised. For Bennion, the writers displayed their intellect, but he noted that Skinner got "the lion's share of the good lines". He felt the ending was "as affecting as it is well-earned". Raeside, in the course of a review of the whole series for The Guardian, claimed that one of the writers' strengths is "pulling at the loose threads of suburban life to reveal the worst of humanity just under the soft furnishings", and that, in "Nana's Party", despite the viewers' assumption that there would be a "gory" conclusion, the "tragedy was an altogether more gruesome punctuation to the story as Pemberton's face betrayed the total emotional collapse going on within". Jack Seale, also writing for The Guardian, claimed that the script was able to move "effortlessly from funny to dark to desperately sad". Phoebe-Jane Boyd, in a review of the episode for the entertainment website Den of Geek, wrote that the tension in "Nana's Party" was "cranked up fantastically", as the story's genre, and viewer's expectations, shift. Owen felt that the writing and cast were able to save what could have been a predictable episode, picking out Skinner as particularly compelling. Bennion also praised the cast, claiming that Skinner, Ashbourne and Kelly were strong, but that Shearsmith gave the best performance. Dessau, too, called the cast "great", and felt that Shearsmith played his part "to perfection".
