= On the Wing =

On the Wing may refer to:

- On the Wing (film), a 1986 IMAX film
- On the Wings, an album released by Socrates Drank The Conium
- "On the Wing", a song from the album Ocean Eyes by Owl City

== See also ==
- "Pigs on the Wing", a song by Pink Floyd
- On the Wings of Love (disambiguation)
