= The Trial of Elizabeth Gadge =

- Inside No. 9 episode
- A poster for the episode, featuring Steve Pemberton as Mr. Clarke, David Warner as Sir Andrew Pike, and Reece Shearsmith as Mr. Warren. Ruth Sheen, as Elizabeth Gadge, is visible in the background.
- Episode no.: Series 2 Episode 3
- Directed by: Dan Zeff
- Written by: Steve Pemberton; Reece Shearsmith
- Original air date: 9 April 2015

Guest appearances
- David Warner as Sir Andrew Pike; Ruth Sheen as Elizabeth Gadge; Sinead Matthews as Sarah Nutter; Jim Howick as Thomas Nutter; Paul Kaye as Richard Two-Shoes; Trevor Cooper as George Waterhouse

Episode chronology
← Previous "The 12 Days of Christine"	Next → "Cold Comfort"

"The Trial of Elizabeth Gadge" is the third episode of the second series of the British dark comedy anthology television programme Inside No. 9. It was written by Reece Shearsmith and Steve Pemberton, and directed by Dan Zeff. It first aired on 9 April 2015 on BBC Two. The story follows a 17th-century witch trial. Elizabeth Gadge, played by Ruth Sheen, stands accused of witchcraft by inhabitants of the village of Little Happens, including characters played by Sinead Matthews, Jim Howick, Paul Kaye and Trevor Cooper. The magistrate Sir Andrew Pike, played by David Warner, has summoned the famed witch-finders Mr Warren and Mr Clarke, played by Shearsmith and Pemberton, to try Elizabeth, but is more concerned with bringing visitors to the village than finding the truth.

The episode was not intended to be a parody of period dramas, but instead to reflect the absurdity of real witch trials. To that end, the characters take the events of the episode seriously, which leads to much of the humour. The writers' influences included Witchfinder General, The Crucible, Monty Python and Hammer Horror films, while the names of the witch-finders were a tribute to actor Warren Clarke. Many critics responded positively to the episode, praising the humour—especially that deriving from the use of archaic language—the writing and the performances. Some, however, considered "The Trial of Elizabeth Gadge" of lower quality than the previous two episodes.

== Production ==
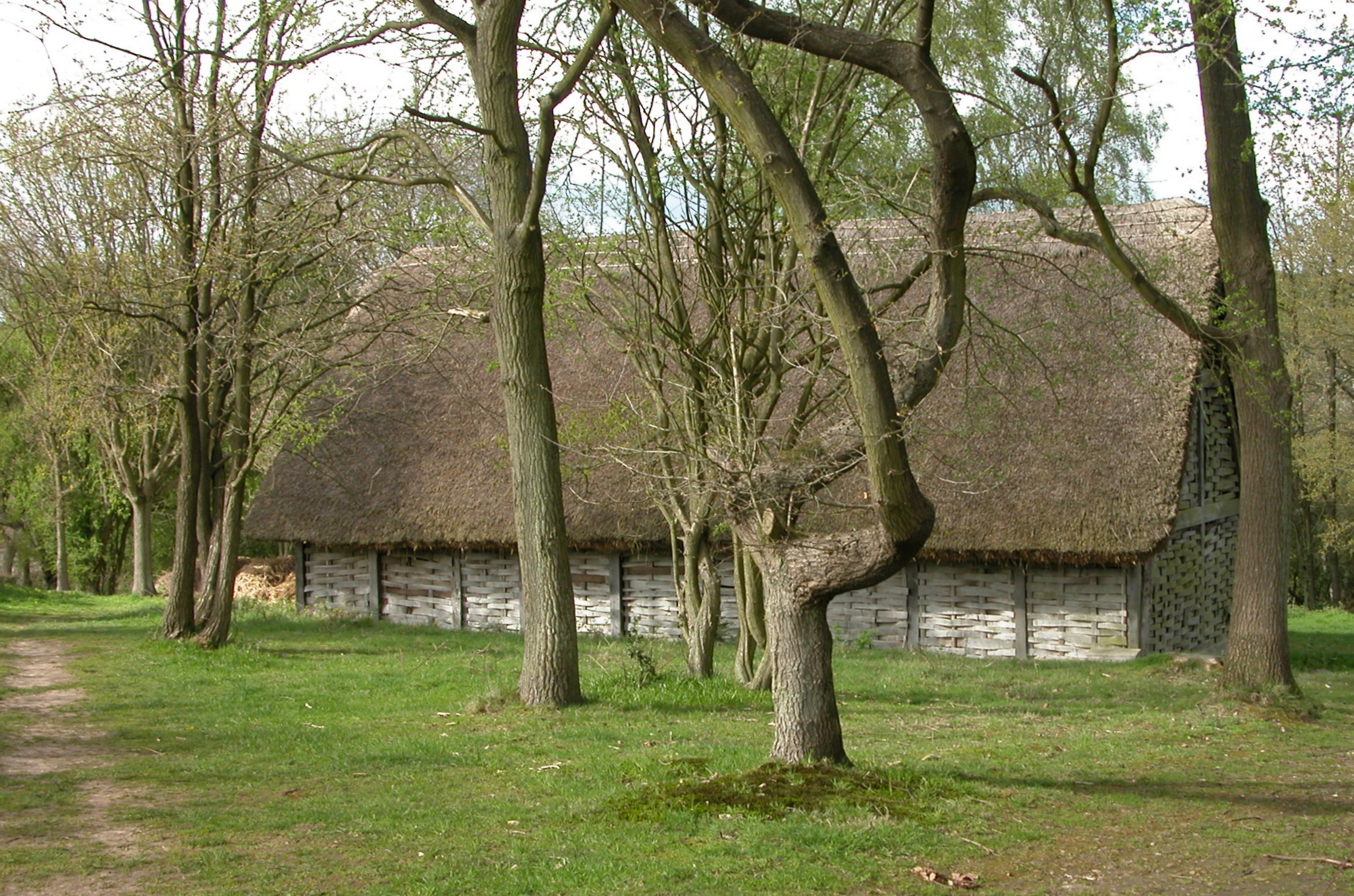
The barn at the Chiltern Open Air Museum where "The Trial of Elizabeth Gadge" was filmed

The second series of Inside No. 9 was written in 2014, and then filmed from the end of 2014 into early 2015. The writing process for "The Trial of Elizabeth Gadge" began with Shearsmith's suggestion of a witch trial as a plot idea, and the writers then worked out the details of the setting. The episode was filmed, mostly in story order, on location in a barn at the Chiltern Open Air Museum. The same location had previously been used for Doctor Who and Horrible Histories. In addition, concurrent with the filming of "The Trial of Elizabeth Gadge", a Drunk History sketch starring Luke Pasqualino—a previous Inside No. 9 guest star—was being filmed nearby. Shot in December, "The Trial of Elizabeth Gadge" was the first episode of the second series to be filmed. The barn was extremely cold during filming; Pemberton joked that, unlike on Titanic, they would not be digitally adding breath in the production process.

"The Trial of Elizabeth Gadge" was written to mimic genuine witch trials, some transcripts of which Pemberton and Shearsmith had read as part of the writing process. The fixation of the characters on "teats" and "suckling", for instance, was something Shearsmith had seen in authentic trials. One writing challenge concerned the need for new information to be revealed with each of the trial's witnesses; this is what shaped the structure of the script. For Shearsmith, given that the trials were already absurd, they cannot be parodied. The humour of the episode, for him, comes precisely from the fact that the characters take the events so seriously, and do not see this absurdity. Pemberton said that the pair aimed for authenticity, and did not seek to produce a spoof of a period piece. To that end, he was complimentary of Yves Barr, a costume designer with whom the writers had worked for a number of years, who did "a fantastic job creating this period on a shoestring". Given that, in his view, "people don't do this period", Shearsmith was excited to film something set in the 17th century. The episode was the only period piece in the first two series, but the writers expressed willingness to do another; they felt that the setting showed that they really could go anywhere with the programme.

As each episode of Inside No. 9 features new characters, the writers were able to attract actors who might have been unwilling to commit to an entire series. "The Trial of Elizabeth Gadge" starred Pemberton and Shearsmith as Mr Warren and Mr Clarke respectively, along with David Warner as Sir Andrew Pike and Ruth Sheen as Elizabeth Gadge. Warner had previously worked with Pemberton and Shearsmith on The League of Gentlemen's Apocalypse, and the writers thought him very well-suited to the role as Sir Andrew Pike. Shearsmith considered Sheen a very capable actress, and complimented the way she played Gadge as a serious character; Pemberton felt she added "gravitas" to the role. Sinead Matthews starred as Sarah Nutter, Jim Howick as Thomas Nutter, Paul Kaye as Richard Two-Shoes, and Trevor Cooper as George Waterhouse. Shearsmith was particularly pleased to have Howick appearing in the episode. As he had appeared in Horrible Histories, he added, for Shearsmith, "a weight of royalty". The "comic coupling" of Howick and Matthews had characters who were originally, mistakenly, named "Gadge", but this did not fit with the characters' relationship with the titular Elizabeth. The couple were renamed "Nutter", a reference to Alice Nutter of the real-world Pendle witch trials.

In addition to the credited actors, the crew had a crowd of extras for one day of filming. Around 12 extras were used; budget constraints allowed this number for a day, or five extras for two days. This constraint led to a change in the script, seeing the crowd removed from the trial. Although uncredited, Goody Two-Shoes was played by an actress who had appeared in Psychoville, one of Pemberton and Shearsmith's previous productions, as Joanne Dunderdale, an understudy. The writers were complimentary of Cooper's performance; they said that he was almost "conducting" the crowd of extras, in that they were noisy when he was shouting, and quiet when he stopped.

In addition to the use of visual effects, the closing sequence required ADR due to the sound of rain on the original filming. The visual effects were the director Dan Zeff's idea, and the writers were pleased that they were within budget. They also serve to tie the final shot to the opening shot of the episode, as both feature a raven. Scenes that were cut down in the editing process included the initial meeting between the witchfinders—Warren and Clarke—and Sir Andrew Pike, and a private discussion between Warren and Clarke after the first day of the trial. The extended versions of the scenes featured an explanation about the Devil being found in everyday objects and a discussion about the stages of torture respectively. Shearsmith expressed frustration that these extra scenes could not be included on the DVD release.

== Plot ==
External videos
- "A Black Imp"; Warren and Clarke tell Sir Andrew Pike about a previous witch hunt.

In 17th century England, the magistrate Sir Andrew Pike (Warner) summons the witch-finders Mr Warren (Shearsmith) and Mr Clarke (Pemberton) to the village of Little Happens. Seventy-year-old Elizabeth Gadge (Sheen) has been accused of witchcraft, and Pike is excited that the news has attracted the attention of outsiders. Pike and Warren already seem convinced of Gadge's guilt, but Clarke remains sceptical.

Elizabeth's case is brought to trial the following morning, with the assistance of the cobbler Richard Two-Shoes (Kaye). Elizabeth's daughter Sarah (Matthews) and son-in-law Thomas Nutter (Howick) testify that they have witnessed Elizabeth sucking from the teat of a furry creature, and speaking to a mouse (believed to be a demon). Elizabeth claims that Sarah and Thomas have falsely accused her, and want to be rid of her to make room in their house. George Waterhouse (Cooper) testifies against Elizabeth, and the accused is questioned. When others in the courtroom begin laughing at her responses, Warren declares that the next person to laugh will be executed as a witch. After an argument breaks out, the witch-finders and Pike decide that the rest of the trial should be conducted in private. Elizabeth is pricked with a needle to test her for the devil's mark. A remorseful Sarah tries to profess her mother's innocence, but Warren does not believe her. Elizabeth says that she has been prostituting herself to Two-Shoes, who wears a fur coat; Two-Shoes denies this, and the trial is adjourned. Throughout proceedings, Warren is accusatory while Clarke is more cautious; Pike, meanwhile, is fascinated both by the lewd acts in which Elizabeth has supposedly engaged and by the witch-finders' torturous implements.

Clarke privately tells Warren that he thinks Elizabeth is innocent and that he is not sure that the pair are doing God's work. Warren threatens that Clarke himself will be tried and convicted if he objects further. The trial resumes—Elizabeth having been tortured overnight—and Elizabeth's mouse, Snowflake, is released, so that it might lead them to the witch. Warren has sprinkled crumbs in front of Elizabeth. When Snowflake approaches Elizabeth, Pike declares her a witch, and sentences her to be burned. Thomas and Sarah later say goodbye to a hooded and bound Elizabeth, who awaits execution. Clarke dismisses them. He removes the hood from the figure to reveal that he has bound Warren in Elizabeth's place; Clarke believes Warren has been tainted with evil, and that the latter is no longer doing God's work. Clarke puts back the hood, and Pike enters, happy that the trial has seen a revival of trade and visitors to the village. Warren is taken away to be burnt. Clarke releases the real Elizabeth, but she reveals that she truly is a witch; she breaks Clarke's neck, killing him. There are sounds of excitement from outside as flames light Elizabeth's face. She tells Snowflake that she will go to her master, then transforms into a raven and leaves.

== Analysis ==
"The Trial of Elizabeth Gadge" is a period piece tribute to Witchfinder General, The Blood on Satan's Claw and The Crucible, while the names "Warren" and "Clarke" are a homage to British actor Warren Clarke, who, at time of production and airing, had recently died. The names were selected prior to Clarke's death—specifically because they were amusing but period appropriate, and not because the actor had any link to the episode's themes—but the writers chose to keep them as a tribute upon the death of Clarke, with whom Shearsmith had previously worked. The style and humour is reminiscent of Horrible Histories and Monty Python. For instance, one scene was directly inspired by the "laughing guard" scene in Monty Python's Life of Brian. Pemberton and Shearsmith themselves, however, did not consider the episode to be particularly reminiscent of Monty Python. The humour is childish, but many of the jokes are "bawdy" and "adult".

Though one critic said that the episode was "the first straight-up comedic episode of the second series", another said that the episode's humour was balanced with tragedy and poignancy, arguing that the whole episode has an element of horror. This was especially true given that the story reflects actual happenings; the depiction of torture was described as "genuinely upsetting". Despite the sole setting of the barn, the episode evokes a degree of folk horror. "The Trial of Elizabeth Gadge" was described by Jonathan Wright (The Guardian) and Phoebe Jane-Boyd (Den of Geek) as like a Hammer Horror film with added humour, and writers for the Irish Examiner said that the episode should appeal to both horror and comedy fans.

Given that Gadge is revealed to actually be a witch, Howick asked Shearsmith whether the former's character, Thomas, truly had witnessed Gadge engaging in some kind of supernatural activity. Shearsmith suggested that Thomas was motivated by greed. However, he begins to regret his choice when he witnesses Gadge being tortured. Pemberton, though, noted that the real-life accusations of witchcraft must have been based on some level of belief.

== Reception ==
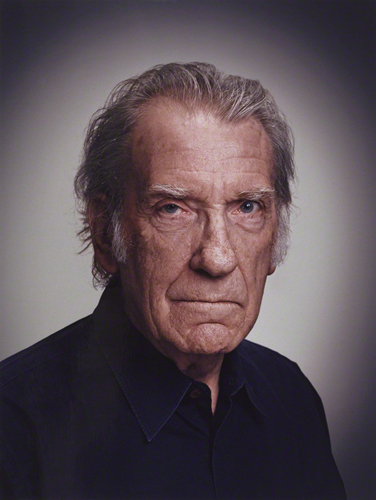
Critics commended the performance of Warner (pictured, 2013) as Pike

Critics generally responded warmly to the episode, but some felt it compared poorly to others in the series. David Chater, writing for The Times, felt that "The Trial of Elizabeth Gadge" was dissimilar from any previous episode of Inside No. 9, but that it was "equally accomplished", while in sister publication The Sunday Times, critics suggested that the change in style showed the writers' versatility. Neela Debnath, writing for The Independent, called "The Trial of Elizabeth Gadge" a "hilariously dark little half-hour of quintessentially British comedy". Rupert Hawksley, writing for The Daily Telegraph, was more critical. He awarded "The Trial of Elizabeth Gadge" three out of five stars, saying that "despite a starry cast and a delightful twist and counter-twist, [the episode] was nothing like as effective" as "La Couchette" and "The 12 Days of Christine", the previous two episodes of the series. The episode, he claimed, was indicative of a "mid-series lull". The freelance journalist Dan Owen felt the episode was "entertaining fare, but too predictable and clichéd to prove genuinely memorable", awarding it two out of four stars. He, too, said the episode felt like "a mid-series misstep". Shearsmith was unhappy with those who thought the episode a "dud" or a "misfire", confessing that it was his favourite episode of the second series. Pemberton felt it was going to be difficult to follow "The 12 Days of Christine", but Shearsmith was of the view that the episodes should not be in competition with each other.

The episode's humour was praised by the majority of commentators. Julia Raeside, writing for The Guardian, said the writers "managed to pull together a loving tribute to [their] cult horror source material with an all-out gag rate that most sitcoms would fail to keep up with", claiming that "they get the look and tone just right and then inject it with the kind of comedy that is perfectly tailored to puncture the fictional world without deflating it". Similarly, Debnath felt that the jokes, including "anachronistic references" and "dark punnery", were "bang on". By contrast, Hawksley claimed that the episode had several "inspired moments", including a "perfectly pitched" joke about selfies, but that the writers had failed to properly exploit the 17th-century setting. Overall, though finding it "occasionally funny", Hawksley thought the episode "fell some way short of what we have come to expect from Pemberton and Shearsmith". For the comedy critic Bruce Dessau, the episode was "all the more hauntingly funny because it is played pretty straight", but he noted that the character of Sir Andrew Pike allowed "some offbeat humour". Chater called the episode "very, very funny", and Philip Cunnington, of the Lancashire Evening Post, called it "one of the funniest half-hours of TV so far this year" after the conclusion of the series.

Television critics praised the writing and acting of "The Trial of Elizabeth Gadge". Though Owen felt that the ending "held little surprise", Paddy Shennan, of the Liverpool Echo, said he "loved the fact that, for the third week running, [he] couldn't work out the twist". For Debnath, "the best was saved till last", but the whole episode was "tightly written". Patrick Mulkern (Radio Times), too, said that "this dark tale soon works a devilish spell". Christine Brandel, writing for entertainment website PopMatters, particularly praised the episode's "beautifully done" dialogue, saying that "it feels authentic in its phrasing, even during the more bizarre (and hilarious) court scenes". Owen, similarly, said "the dialogue was also frequently hilarious, with Shearsmith and Pemberton having a fine ear for the rhythms of Olde English and how best to have characters deadpan their way through some ridiculous sentences." Hawksley praised Warner's "effortlessly batty" performance as Sir Andrew Pike, and claimed that Sheen "brought an unsettling complexity" to the title character. Gerard Gilbert, of The Independent, claimed Warner was clearly "having a ball" as Pike, and Wright (The Guardian) said "Warner quite brilliantly makes the most of every line he's given". Brandel considered Warner one of the best guest stars of the series.
