= Séance Time =

- Inside No. 9 episode
- Episode poster featuring Madam Talbot (Alison Steadman) and Hives (Reece Shearsmith)
- Episode no.: Series 2 Episode 6
- Directed by: Dan Zeff
- Written by: Steve Pemberton; Reece Shearsmith
- Editing by: Joe Randall-Cutler
- Original air date: 29 April 2015

Guest appearances
- Sophie McShera as Tina; Alison Steadman as "Madam Talbot"/Anne; Dan Starkey as "Blue Demon Dwarf"/Clive; Cariad Lloyd as Gemma; Alice Lowe as Amanda; Caden-Ellis Wall as William

Episode chronology
← Previous "Nana's Party"	Next → "The Devil of Christmas"

"Séance Time" is the sixth and final episode of the second series of the British dark comedy anthology television programme Inside No. 9. It was first broadcast on 29 April 2015 on BBC Two. The episode was written by Steve Pemberton and Reece Shearsmith, and directed by Dan Zeff. It stars Pemberton, Shearsmith, Alison Steadman, Alice Lowe, Sophie McShera, Dan Starkey, Cariad Lloyd and Caden-Ellis Wall. The episode begins with Tina (McShera) arriving at a Victorian villa for a séance. Hives (Shearsmith) sits her at a table and then escorts the ominous, shrouded Madam Talbot (Steadman) into the room.

Like "The Harrowing", the final episode of the first series of Inside No. 9, "Séance Time" is somewhat more horrific than is typical for the programme, though humour remains. In writing the episode, Pemberton and Shearsmith began with the idea of a séance, and developed the plot from there. The theme was one that they had wanted to address for some time, though they wanted to approach it in an original way. The writers aimed to begin "Séance Time" with minimal humour, presenting it as straight horror, before introducing the first twist.

The episode explores both the norms of horror films and the unpleasantness of actors and the television industry. Critics responded positively to "Séance Time", praising the horror—several considered the episode genuinely frightening—the humour, and the writing. Steadman's performance was singled out as strong, with critics commending her character as a highlight.

== Plot ==
External videos
- "Madam Talbot"; Hives (Shearsmith) presents Madam Talbot (Steadman) to Tina (McShera)

Tina (McShera) arrives at a Victorian villa for a séance. Hives (Shearsmith) settles Tina before retrieving Talbot (Steadman), who arrives shrouded in black and carrying a doll. Talbot, an elderly woman with heavy cataracts, speaks in a high-pitched voice, unnerving Tina. When the séance begins, objects fly around the room, Talbot's voice becomes demonic and ectoplasm seeps from her mouth. Hives encourages Tina not to break the circle, but she does so when a blue-faced demon (Starkey) appears behind her. She is terrified until Hives reveals himself to be Terry, the host of a hidden camera programme called Scaredy Cam.

Scaredy Cam production crew, including the director Gemma (Lloyd) and the make-up artist Amanda (Lowe), enter to prepare for the next prank. "Talbot" is being played by the demanding stage actress Anne, but the other crew are unable to remember the name of the extra (who they falsely believe to be a dwarf) playing "Blue Demon Dwarf". They mostly ignore him, despite his eagerness to talk about his acting experiences and his requests for a drink. Terry is irritable and impatient, unwilling to talk to Tina or Gemma about a prank with him dressed up as a gorilla. This prank led to a young boy wetting himself and a previous cancellation of Scaredy Cam. The programme is due to return on a different channel, and Terry has chosen a different prank to be announced as the winner of a "public" vote for the programme's best. The extra confronts Terry about the fact he was originally cast as "Spirit of Little Boy", but Terry does not care, and the extra is sent back into a chest to wait for the next member of the public.

Pete (Pemberton), a new mark, enters, but the prank does not work as well as with Tina. Among other problems, Pete swears too much and does not seem affected by the atmosphere, while cues are missed by the pranksters. Terry is surprised to hear a child's voice during Anne's performance as Madam Talbot, and, backstage, the camera stream is blurry. When "Blue Demon Dwarf" appears, Pete punches him, and the production crew rush in. The extra drifts in and out of consciousness before Gemma—having covered her face in blue paint after giving mouth-to-mouth—says he has died. Backstage, people wait for the police and ambulance; Terry is worried about his career, Anne wants to get away for some food and Amanda is keen to retrieve props from the corpse, but Pete and Gemma show some remorse. When alone, Terry looks to the camera feed and sees the extra standing in the séance room, and, relieved, runs to see him. Facing away from Terry and speaking in a rasping voice, the figure introduces himself as "Spirit of Little Boy", and talks of a suicide after the embarrassment of wetting himself on television. After speaking to the "boy", Terry believes that he himself is on Scaredy Cam, but no one is watching from backstage. When he touches the figure, the extra collapses, but a child's voice continues to shout. A corpse-like child (Wall) begins to rise from the cot used for Madam Talbot's doll. Backstage, Gemma and a police officer look for Terry. They find him in the séance room; he has wet himself, and insists that he is on Scaredy Cam. The child's face appears on the camera feed.

== Production ==
=== Inspiration and writing ===
The second series of Inside No. 9 was written in 2014 by the programme's creators Steve Pemberton and Reece Shearsmith. The idea for "Séance Time" began with the "trigger" of a séance, and the plot grew out of this, while the episode's title was taken from a line performed by David Warner in the 1974 film From Beyond the Grave. Shearsmith had previously taken part in a séance with The League of Gentlemen in a putatively-haunted house. He had heard tapping and seen movement on a ouija board, and believed he had experienced something supernatural until Mark Gatiss confessed that he was responsible. Shearsmith said that he and Pemberton had always wanted to do a séance-inspired story, but had never been able to find a new angle from which to approach the theme. "Séance Time", he thought, "felt a bit different" from how séances had previously been portrayed. The writers were unsure how to conclude the episode, and considered 15 to 20 different endings before settling on the one they used.

=== Casting and characters ===
As each episode of Inside No. 9 features new characters, the writers were able to attract actors who might have been unwilling to commit to an entire series. "Séance Time" starred Sophie McShera as Tina—though Tina was played by an uncredited extra in the opening shot of a house's exterior—Shearsmith as "Hives"/Terry, Alison Steadman as "Madam Talbot"/Anne, Dan Starkey as "Blue Demon Dwarf"/Clive, (Note: The name Clive is not revealed in the episode, and nor was it originally included in the episode's credits. Much of the humour in "Séance Time" revolves around other characters not knowing Clive's name, and so any mention of it was removed.) Cariad Lloyd as Gemma, Alice Lowe as Amanda, Pemberton as Pete and Caden-Ellis Wall as William. (Note: Wall's character's name is not revealed in the episode, but it appears in the cast list.) The writers felt the episode featured a number of good roles for women. Members of Inside No. 9's crew, include the episode's third assistant director Saloum N'Jie, appeared as uncredited extras playing members of a television crew. Though there were only a small production crew seen in the episode, this mirrors real crews of the kind featured.

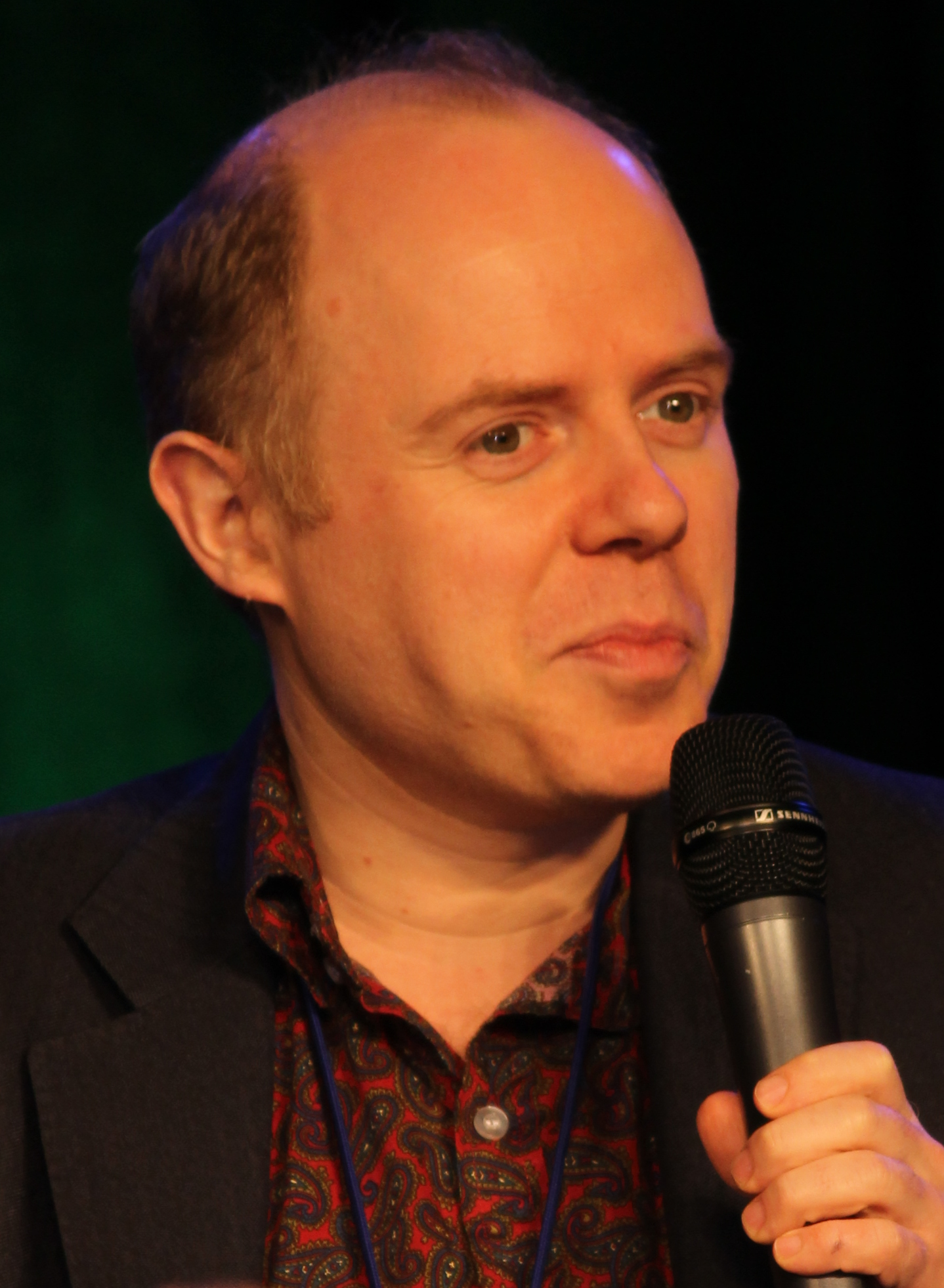
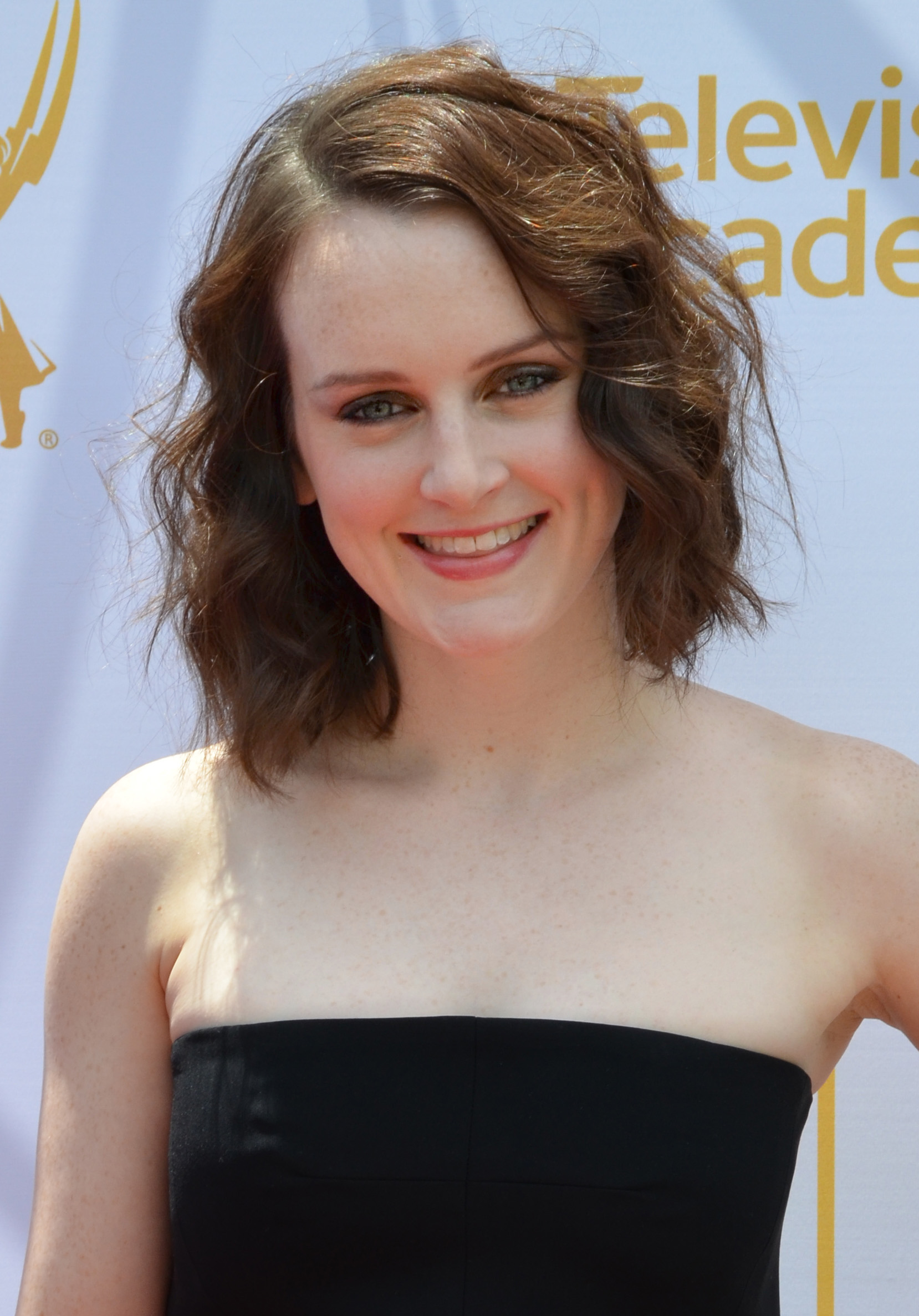
Among the episode's guest stars were Dan Starkey (left, pictured 2015) and Sophie McShera (right, pictured 2014).

Shearsmith had previously worked with Steadman on Agatha Christie's Marple, while she and Pemberton had met, though the pair had not worked together. She was ill upon arrival for filming, which led to Pemberton worrying that production would have to be suspended. As a result of Steadman's illness, her character's croaking voice was mostly her own. One journalist commented on the appropriateness of the casting, given the influence of Abigail's Party—in which Steadman starred—on "Nana's Party", the previous week's episode. The actor was one of a number (the others being Jane Horrocks and Claire Skinner) who appeared in Inside No. 9's second series who had also starred in Life Is Sweet. During filming, Steadman expressed happiness to be working with Pemberton and Shearsmith. She explained that they are excellent writers as they are "off the wall".

Pemberton knew McShera through his friend Siobhan Finneran, who co-starred with McShera in Downton Abbey. He felt that McShera would be able to bring a "mousey quality" to the role of Tina. Shearsmith felt that her performance was funny while retaining realism. The writers found the role of "Blue Demon Dwarf" difficult to cast, but were very happy with the performance of Starkey, who kept some of his character's props. The writers also praised Lowe, who they felt was able to make a lot of a comparatively small part. The character of Amanda, they said, was to seem bored and aloof, attempting to get away with doing as little work as possible, while also favouring people seen as more important.

The name Hives, used by Shearsmith's character, was taken from a Laurel and Hardy butler of the same name. Meanwhile, Hives's costume and mannerisms were inspired by those worn and adopted by Noel Edmonds in undercover practical jokes. A related influence for the episode was a prank-gone-wrong seen on YouTube, in which a joke's target punches a costumed person when the latter surprises the former. Pemberton's character spoke with a cockney accent, something unusual for Pemberton, who normally does not affect accents when acting. In addition to playing Pete, Pemberton provided the deep voice spoken by "Madam Talbot" during the séance.

=== Style ===
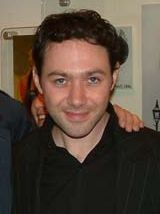
Shearsmith (pictured, 2003), as well as co-writing the episode, starred as "Hives"/Terry.

Shearsmith said that he and Pemberton sometimes aim to produce episodes with genuinely scary scenes, comparing "Séance Time" to "The Harrowing", the sixth episode of Inside No. 9's first series, which was also particularly horrific. He said that the writers and crew had similar aims in terms of atmosphere in "Séance Time" as they had in "The Harrowing". The episodes also shared similar openings, with a lone woman walking towards a large house. Thematically, Shearsmith felt that the episode served to tie together a number of ideas with which he had been "obsessed" for years, including horror, ghosts and magic. The episode's director, Dan Zeff, got behind the idea of genuine horror, and Shearsmith was happy with how the initial séance was portrayed. A large number of horror clichés were used, but the reason that these clichés are present is subsequently revealed.

Props utilised to heighten the horror included a trick candle—swapped back-and-forth with a real one—which could shoot a large flame. This was operated by a technician hiding under the table on which it was placed. A doll seen on screen, the writers claimed, was probably visible only to Terry among the characters. For the white eyes of "Madam Talbot", Steadman wore partially white contact lenses. Had she worn fully white lenses, she would have been unable to see, and this would have led to more work for the production crew. Instead, her partially white eyes were made fully white in post-production. Also added in post-production was the wetness of Terry's clothes in the final scene.

The writers hoped to fool viewers into thinking that they were doing a straightforward séance episode, and so there is little humour prior to the episode's first twist. For Steadman, the writing meant that both the audience and the character of Tina are fooled together. Nonetheless, humour remained elsewhere in the script; Lloyd looked forward to performing a particular joke involving blue paint. Terry refers to his colleagues variously as "Pepe and His Friends", a reference to a variety act with a similar name, and a "warm prop", a disparaging name which, according to the writers, has been used in the film industry to refer to extras.

=== Filming and release ===
Inside No. 9's second series was filmed from the end of 2014 into early 2015. "Séance Time" was the second episode of the second series to be filmed, and the filming was completed shortly before production ceased for a Christmas break. The episode was filmed at Langleybury, a country house in Abbots Langley, Hertfordshire. The same house was used for "The Harrowing", as well as in Shearsmith and Pemberton's pre-Inside No. 9 television series Psychoville.

On its first showing on BBC Two, "Séance Time" was moved from Inside No. 9's usual slot on a Thursday evening. It was instead shown on Wednesday 29 April; this showing was at 10pm in most of the UK, and at 11.20pm in Northern Ireland. The freelance journalist Dan Owen suggested that this, combined with their refusal to release the series on Blu-ray, suggested that the BBC had little faith in Inside No. 9. He nonetheless called for a third series, a request echoed by other commentators. In their commentary on the episode, Pemberton said that he and Shearsmith had plans for a potential third series, and hoped to be able to get on with producing it. "Séance Time", along with the other episodes from the second series, was released on DVD on 5 May 2016, and a third series was announced in October of that year.

== Analysis ==
"Séance Time" draws inspiration from horror films and "the pretensions of actors"—two themes favoured by the writers. Horror tropes noted by journalists include the Insidious-inspired arrival of "Blue Demon Dwarf" and Madam Talbot's demonic voice, reminiscent of a similar voice in The Exorcist. For one critic, Pete's initial failure to believe the prank results in a memorable sequence that "was a lovely statement about how old-fashioned horror imagery and well-worn tropes can be terrifying in the right hands, and plain ludicrous if you refuse to enter into the spirit of things".

Though the episode begins with horror, similar to "The Harrowing", it quickly moves into the more meta subject of television production; something "more intimidating and probably a lot crueller" than the supernatural. For the television critic Matt Baylis, the episode is a criticism of the callousness of reality television (such as Candid Camera) from the perspective of television plays. The horror at the start of the episode, he argues, continues even once the ruse is revealed. "Ugliness" remains in Terry's arrogance, Anne's self-obsession and the indifference of Gemma and Amanda. This builds gradually into a "moral horror" in which "the unkind got their desserts".

Phoebe-Jane Boyd, writing for the entertainment website Den of Geek, compared the television crew to individuals pulled out of the "Summerland" (Note: Summerland is the name used by Madam Talbot for the astral plane.) of cancelled television. Terry is "parasitic and dead of heart", an example of a particular brand of "washed-up middle-aged television presenters". Amanda is "so deadened to the bitchery of the entertainment industry" that she is unfazed at the thought of retrieving props from a corpse. Anne behaves in a "bitter and narcissistic" way. The "heartless asides" concerning the previous misjudged prank are mirrored by the distaste directed towards Clive.

== Reception ==
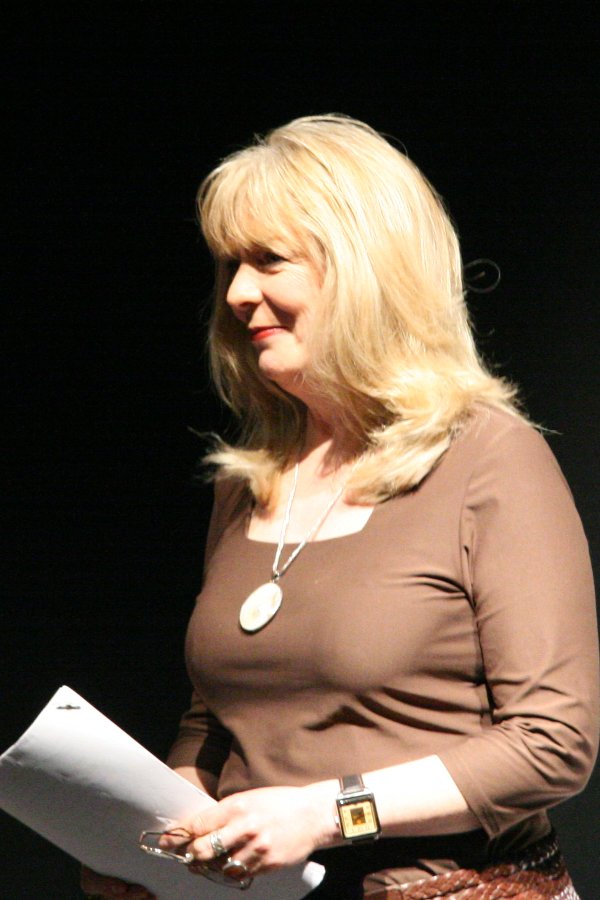
Critics praised the performance of Alison Steadman (pictured, 2006)

Critics responded positively to "Séance Time", with a number of them characterising it as genuinely scary. Vicki Power, writing for The Daily Telegraph, described the episode as "clever and chilling", while Julia Raeside and Victoria Segal, writing for The Sunday Times, called it "cleverly executed", and Baylis described it as "a faith-restorer for those who love" television drama. Mark Jones, writing for theguardian.com, called the episode "suitably spooky" and a "fitting end to a second series that has excelled at times", and Chris Bennion, writing for The Independent, similarly described it as a "brilliant series finale". A contrary opinion was offered in a review in the Liverpool Echo; the author called "Séance Time" a "decent enough watch", but felt that it was "a relatively disappointing episode" which was "unable to match what had gone before". Baylis and Bennion stressed that the episode was very scary, with Bennion comparing it to "The Harrowing"; he was complimentary of both, particularly their respective final scenes. Owen also compared the two, but noted that "Séance Time" contains more humour.

Bennion commended the writing, saying that Pemberton and Shearsmith were able to subvert expectations of séances several times; "just as you're smugly congratulating yourself for working out every twist and turn, they pull it from your grasp". Owen praised the writing and subversion of expectations, and, though he found some of the twists predictable and felt that the ending needed more groundwork, felt that the final sequence "was worth it for another brown-trouser moment". Bennion felt that the "genius" of the episode was the way that tension was "undercut" with humour, but felt that the humour actually served to raise the tension. He highlighted the joke involving blue paint as particularly funny. Patrick Mulkern, of Radio Times, also praised the mix of humour and horror.

Raeside and Segal felt that Steadman's performance was the highlight of the episode, and it was also praised in the Liverpool Echo. Bennion said that Steadman "[hammed] it up beautifully" and "[nailed] each [joke] with aplomb", also commending the "comic turns" from Lowe and Lloyd. Mulkern described Steadman's Madam Talbot as "hilariously theatrical", and Boyd said that Steadman's Anne provided "some of the best fun of the episode".
