= Sophie McShera =

English actress (born 1985)

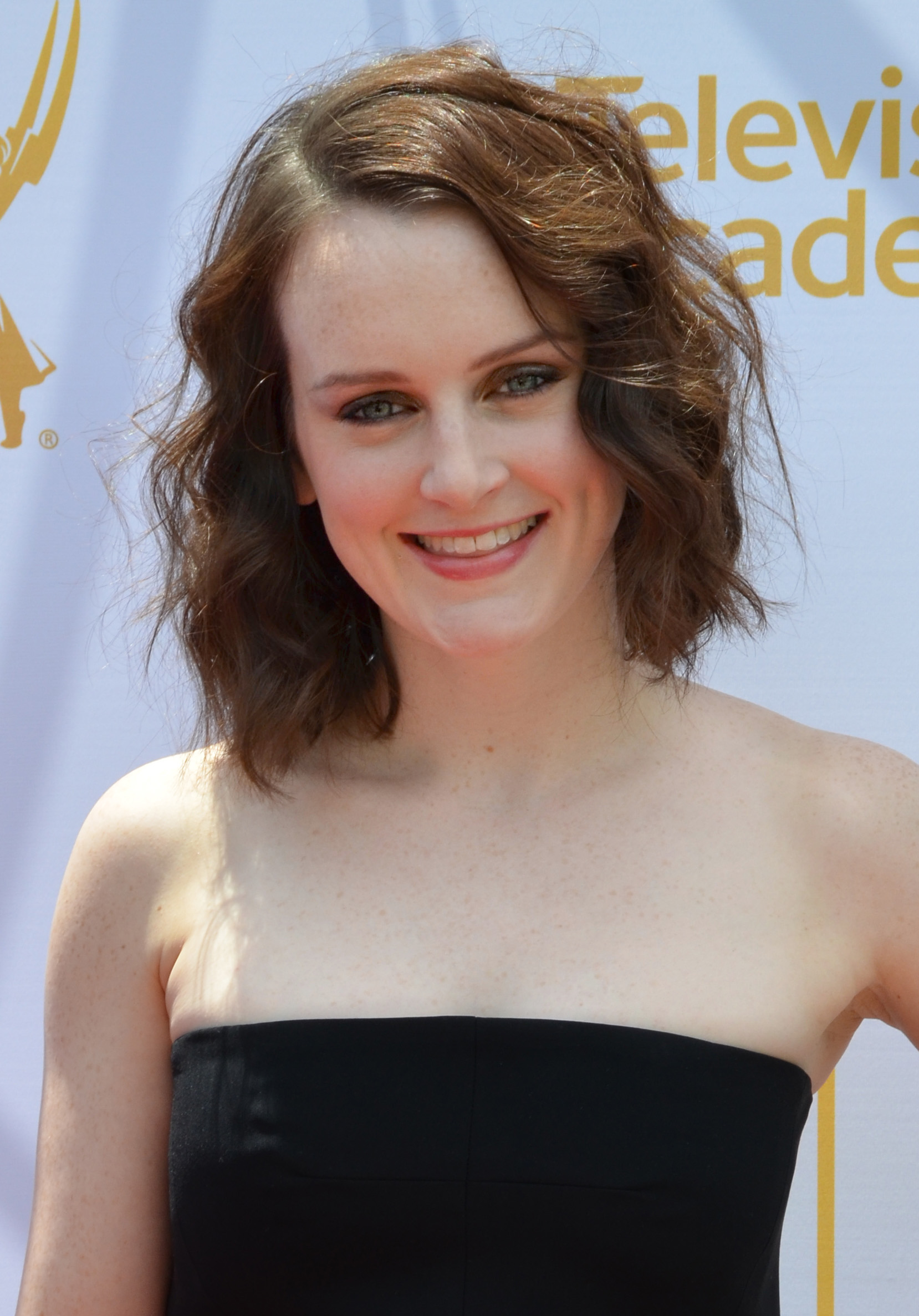
- McShera at an event for Downton Abbey cast and creators in May 2014.
- Born: 17 May 1985 (age 41); Bradford, West Yorkshire, England
- Education: Brunel University (BFA)
- Occupation: Actress
- Years active: 2007–present
- Known for: Waterloo Road; Downton Abbey; The Job Lot; Cinderella

Sophie McShera (born 17 May 1985) is an English actress known for her roles as Ros McCain in the fifth series of the BBC television series Waterloo Road, as Daisy Mason in the ITV television series Downton Abbey, and as Drizella Tremaine in the 2015 Disney film Cinderella.

== Early life, education, and personal life ==
McShera was born in Bradford, West Yorkshire, England, into a large Irish family. Her mother is a teacher and her father is a teacher turned financial adviser. At an early age, her family moved to nearby Eccleshill, West Yorkshire, also in Bradford, where she attended St Joseph's College.

During high school, she attended the Footsteps Theatre School before getting her stage break at the age of twelve in the comedy The Goodbye Girl. She followed this up with a stint on tour with Annie, later going to Brunel University, London, where she earned a degree in drama.

McShera told Rachel Ray In Season magazine in 2019 that she was a vegetarian.

== Career ==
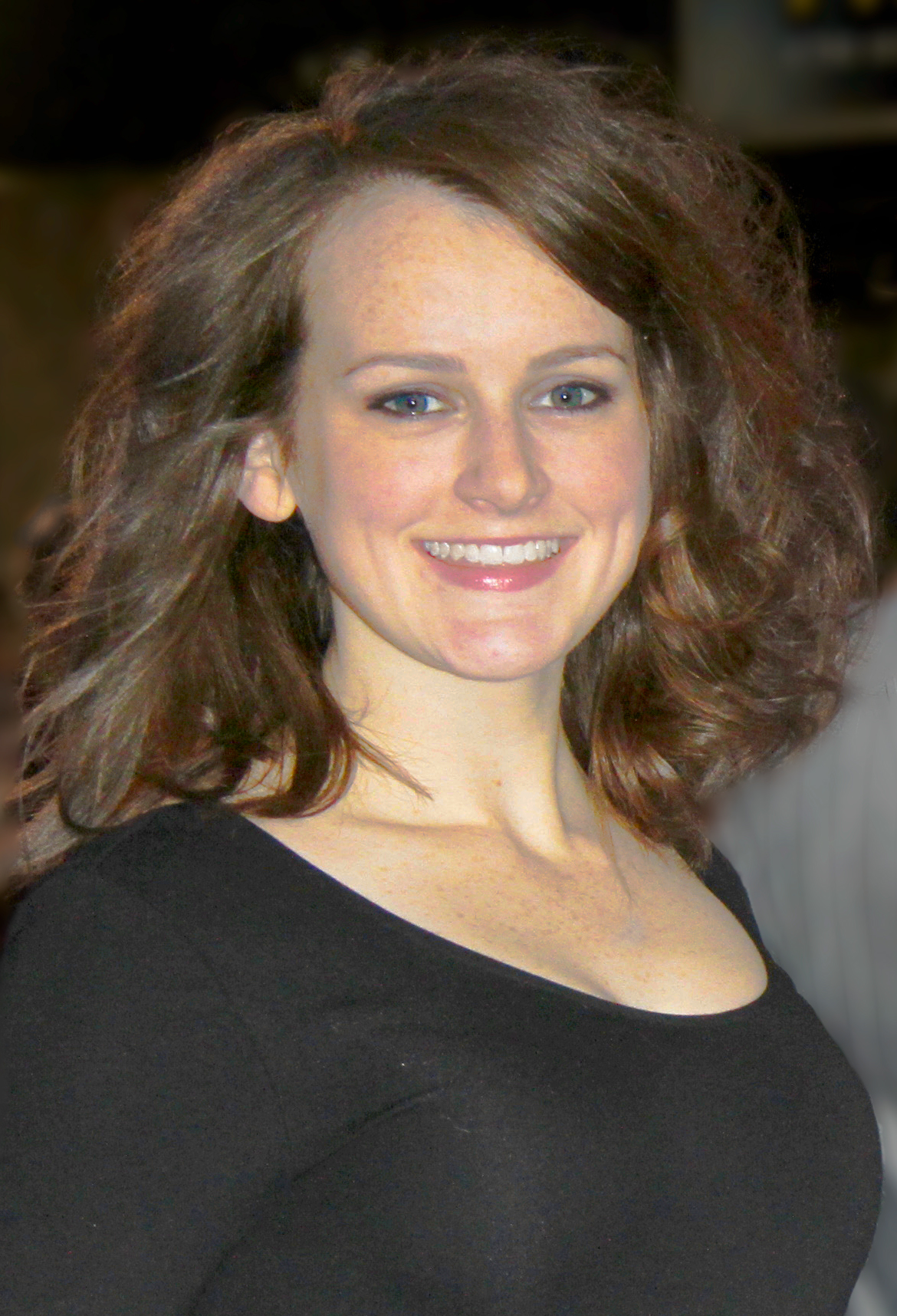
McShera in 2011

McShera's acting career started after university in 2007, with roles in the soap operas Emmerdale and Doctors and the drama Survivors in 2008. In 2009, she joined the regular cast of BBC One school-based drama series Waterloo Road, playing A-level student Ros McCain for the entirety of the fifth series. Ros' storylines revolved around her trying to fulfil her academic potential and also questioning her sexuality. Following her departure from Waterloo Road, McShera became part of the cast of Julian Fellowes' ITV costume drama Downton Abbey as Daisy, the kitchen maid. The show attracted critical and popular success. McShera, alongside Hugh Bonneville, made a personal thank you to the audience after Downton Abbey won Most Popular TV Drama at the 2012 National TV Awards. Since 2013 McShera has played Job Centre regular Bryony in ITV2 sitcom The Job Lot. McShera played stepsister Drisella Tremaine in Disney's 2015 film Cinderella. She displayed her singing skills as lady's maid Gwynne in the ABC musical comedy series Galavant.

Her stage roles include playing the eponymous role in the pantomime Cinderella at the West Yorkshire Playhouse between December 2009 and January 2010, In 1998 she appeared as Annie alongside Paul O'Grady for the show's London run and subsequent tour. In 2011 she joined the cast of Jez Butterworth's award-winning stage play Jerusalem playing the role of Pea for the play's return to London's West End at the Apollo Theatre. She made her stage return in 2025 in the European premiere of Shucked at Regent’s Park Open Air Theatre in the role of Maizy.

== Filmography ==
=== Film ===
Year	Title	Role	Notes
2015	Cinderella	Drisella Tremaine	
2019	Downton Abbey	Daisy Mason	
2019	The Personal History of David Copperfield	Mrs. Crupp	
2022	Downton Abbey: A New Era	Daisy Parker	
2025	Downton Abbey: The Grand Finale	Daisy Parker	

=== Television ===
Year	Title	Role	Notes
2006	Young Dracula	Extra	"A Matter of Life and Chess"
2007	Emmerdale	Danielle Hollywell	2 episodes
2008	Doctors	Mandy Fairfield	"One Dog Day"
2008	Survivors	Cathy	"1.1"
2009–2010	Waterloo Road	Ros McCain	19 episodes
2010–2015	Downton Abbey	Daisy Robinson/Daisy Mason	52 episodes
2013–2015	The Job Lot	Bryony	10 episodes
2013	Highway to Dhampus	Ginny Topham	
2013	Bradford: A City of Dreams	Narrator	
2015–2016	Galavant	Gwynne	8 episodes
2015	Inside No. 9	Tina	"Séance Time"
2017	Murdered for Being Different	Mandy	
2017	Timewasters	Rose	
2018	Murdoch Mysteries	Ann Ryand	"Murdoch Mystery Mansion"
2018	Porters	Pippa	
2019	London Kills	Karen Harrison	"The Dark"
2020	The Queen's Gambit	Miss Graham	Miniseries, 2 episodes
2023	The Gallows Pole	Grace Hartley	Miniseries
