= The 12 Days of Christine =

- Inside No. 9 episode
- Episode no.: Series 2 Episode 2
- Directed by: Guillem Morales
- Written by: Steve Pemberton; Reece Shearsmith
- Original air date: 2 April 2015

Guest appearances
- Sheridan Smith as Christine; Tom Riley as Adam; Stacy Liu as Fung; Michele Dotrice as Marion; Paul Copley as Ernie; Joel Little and Dexter Little as Jack; Jessica Ellerby as Zara

Episode chronology
← Previous "La Couchette"	Next → "The Trial of Elizabeth Gadge"

"The 12 Days of Christine" is the second episode of the second series of British black comedy anthology series Inside No. 9. It first aired on 2 April 2015 on BBC Two. It was written by Steve Pemberton and Reece Shearsmith, and directed by Guillem Morales. The episode tells the story of Christine, a young woman living in a small flat, over 12 years in her life, focusing on key days and life events in that time. Christine is played by Sheridan Smith, while those who play an important part in her life are played variously by Tom Riley, Stacy Liu, Michele Dotrice, Paul Copley, Pemberton, Jessica Ellerby, Joel Little and Dexter Little. Shearsmith plays the Stranger, an unknown figure apparently haunting Christine.

"The 12 Days of Christine" departed from the usual black comedy of Inside No. 9 to instead focus on drama. The story was interpreted in a number of different ways by commentators, who differed in their understanding of Christine's life and confused perspective, and the identity of the Stranger. Reviewers responded extremely positively to the episode, which was awarded five out of five stars in both The Times and The Telegraph. Critics variously commended the performances of the actors, particularly Smith, the poignancy of the plot, and the impact of the unforeseen ending.

== Production ==
The second series of Inside No. 9 was written in 2014, and then filmed from the end of 2014 into early 2015. "The 12 Days of Christine" follows the life of Christine over 12 years, with the story told through scenes showing the key events in that time. Shearsmith described this as a very unusual episode structure and storytelling method, but felt that, in this case, it was effective. On writing the script, Pemberton and Shearsmith immediately thought of Sheridan Smith as a performer who would be suitable to play Christine. Both had previously worked with her, and the pair hoped that she would be willing to accept the role. Smith had been a long-time fan of the writers' work, and enjoyed the way the format of Inside No. 9 allows standalone stories. She was "gripped" by the script, and accepted the role; during filming, she said she was "over the moon" to be working with Pemberton and Shearsmith.

As each episode of Inside No. 9 features new characters, the writers were able to attract actors who might have been unwilling to commit to an entire series. "The 12 Days of Christine" starred Smith as Christine, around whom the story revolves. Adam, Christine's partner, was played by Tom Riley, and Stacy Liu played Fung, Christine's roommate. Christine's parents—Marion and Ernie—were played by Michele Dotrice and Paul Copley, while Christine's son Jack was played by Joel Little and Dexter Little. Christine's colleague Bobby was played by Pemberton, and Adam's colleague Zara was played by Jessica Ellerby. Shearsmith plays the Stranger, a mysterious man who repeatedly appears to Christine. For the second series of Inside No. 9, Pemberton and Shearsmith were permitted to build two sets; the first was for "La Couchette", the first episode of the series, and the second was for "The 12 Days of Christine". The two were built alongside each other at Twickenham Studios. Smith described the fake flat as "lovely", explaining that it was "a full set; bedroom, bathroom, working taps – everything". She considered the flat's 1970s decor "really cool" and "funky".

== Plot ==
External videos
- "Happy New Year"; Christine brings Adam back to her flat after the pair have met at a new year's party.

Christine (Smith) arrives home to her flat with Adam (Riley), whom she has just met at a New Year's party. Thirteen months later, it is Valentine's Day and Christine chats with her flatmate Fung (Liu) at home. Christine is dating Adam, but receives a card from her first boyfriend, whom she has not seen since childhood. On Mother's Day, Christine's mother Marion (Dotrice) visits. Marion reveals that Christine's first boyfriend died when he was 16, which Christine had forgotten. Marion urges Christine to marry Adam; Christine's father Ernie (Copley) has Alzheimer's disease and is deteriorating. The following year, Adam moves in with Christine at Easter. Christine begins to prepare a surprise for him, but is disturbed when an egg smashes on a nearby wall. In her kitchen, she is approached by an unknown man, the Stranger (Shearsmith) who says "I'm sorry".

Christine, now pregnant and married, awakens startled on a May bank holiday. Adam and Christine struggle to build a cot. Thirteen months later, it is Father's Day and Adam tends to their son Jack (played variously by Joel Little and Dexter Little) in the night. Christine hears the Stranger's voice through the baby monitor saying "Come on little man, let's get you out of there" and rushes into Jack's room. She sees the cot is empty and believes that Jack has been kidnapped. She calls to Adam, but Adam returns from another room with Jack in his arms. Christine celebrates her 30th birthday thirteen months later. Ernie no longer recognises Christine, while Adam is more interested in his colleague Zara (Ellerby). Marion blindfolds Christine for a game of blind man's buff, which she insists Christine has played every year on her birthday since she was 6. Christine hears suspicious noises from behind a door and removes her blindfold to step through. Thirteen months later, Adam is packing a case for a family holiday. Ernie has died, and Christine's relationship with Adam is strained.

There is another time shift, and, now divorced from Adam, Christine films Jack as he gets ready for his first day of school. Left alone in the flat, Christine is comforted by Ernie as she cries. On Hallowe'en of the next year, Christine dresses up with her friend Bobby (Pemberton), a colleague at Clarks. Someone Christine assumes to be Adam enters the flat to pick up Jack. When Adam calls at the door, Christine goes to Jack's room and finds Jack in the arms of the Stranger. On Bonfire Night, Christine arrives home with Jack, who has burnt his hand on a sparkler. Marion finds that Jack is not injured, but says that Christine was burnt the same way when she was Jack's age. She pulls her sleeve down to reveal a scar.

It is Christmas, and Christine is having dinner with Marion, Ernie, Fung, Bobby and Adam. Christine and Adam are back together. Christine unwraps her present to find an album of photos from her life, and then realizes what is happening. She has been dying as a result of a road collision as emergency services attempt to free her while her memories replay themselves. The Stranger claims to have accidentally stepped onto the road causing the crash. He explains to the police that although he rescued Jack, he could not reach Christine, and that he is sorry. At the dinner table, Jack enters dressed as a Nativity angel. Marion says it is time for Christine to go. Christine says a final goodbye.

== Analysis ==
"The 12 Days of Christine" was a departure from the typical "claustrophobic black comedy" of Inside No. 9; the episode has more limited use of humour, though comedic elements do remain. For John Dugdale, writing in The Sunday Times, it resembled an arthouse film. From the beginning of the episode, there are clues to the content of the closing scenes, including the sound of a heartbeat, sounds associated with cars, and blue flashing lights. There are also a number of allusions to horror films; Fung is referred to as "the grudge", the Stranger's appearance evokes Don't Look Now and the throwing of eggs may be associated with Ghostbusters. The name "Christine", too, can be seen as a reference to Stephen King's Christine.

=== Interpretation ===
For Chris Bennion, writing in The Independent, the events of "The 12 Days of Christine" are a life review; the viewer shares Christine's visions of her life as she lies dying. However, like Christine, the viewer does not realise this until the end. For Bennion, Christine does not merely relive key moments of her life, but attempts to "snatch at lost moments" as she longs "for second chances". Julie McDowall, who reviewed the episode for The Herald, also considers the viewer "totally immersed in one character's confused and flawed point of view". She argued that "there was no thunderclap moment when the story's twist is spectacularly revealed. There was just the slow and terrible realisation which we shared with Christine. We were with her, thinking 'Oh god no, not that. Don't let it be that!'" Ultimately, claims McDowall, the oddities and confusion in the episode's plot are revealed to be the product of Christine's "brain slowly fading, her memories blinking out, light by light, into darkness". Phoebe-Jane Boyd, whose review of the episode was published on entertainment website Den of Geek, likewise saw the episode as Christine's life flashing before her eyes, with a variety of elements from the scene of the crash — police cars, car sounds, the song on the radio — indicative of "her consciousness ... becoming muddled as parts of the car accident crash through into her memories".

Andrew Billen argued that the episode used the link between the "breaches of realism" in ghost stories and the "transgressions" of comedy in order "to make a serious statement about the supernatural". For him, the episode was a story about "human memory's spasmodic grasp" and Christine's "friable mental condition". The fact that Christine has forgotten about the death of her first boyfriend — that Christine has a "memory like a sieve" — is, for Billen, "inexplicable". The haunting element of the story, Billen suggests, is indicative of mental illness; specifically, Christine's early-onset Alzheimer's disease. That Christine is afflicted with the condition means that her life has become a "nightmare version" of blind man's buff. The motif of blindness—Christine's mental blindness juxtaposed with physical blindness—again emerges with the recurrence of "Con te partirò", performed by Andrea Bocelli, who is blind. Billen conceded that his interpretation may be incorrect, and that the episode may have been a single "dying dream". McDowall noted that, with Christine's growing unhappiness and increasingly dishevelled appearance as the episode progresses, it is easy to see the story as about a mental collapse.

The episode can also be seen as a story of revenge; it can be imagined that Christine has repressed the memory of her first boyfriend, and that he "has come back into her life seeking revenge". On this interpretation, the Stranger is the boyfriend, and causes the crash by stepping out in front of Christine's car. McDowall suggests that the oddness early in the episode suggests that the story may be about "an obsessive ex [or] a stalker". There is also indication that the episode is a ghost story. While Boyd sees this as misdirection on the part of the writers, for Benji Wilson, writing in The Daily Telegraph, the story is about ghosts, "but not in the normal way – by the close you realised everyone's life is a ghost story, it’s just that your memories are the ghosts."

== Reception ==
"The 12 Days of Christine" was extremely well received by television critics. It was awarded five out of five stars by Billen (The Times) and Wilson (Daily Telegraph), who, respectively, called it a "masterpiece" and "a quiet elegy, terse and polished, in many ways perfect". The comedy critic Bruce Dessau said he could not "speak highly enough of this episode", while McDowall (The Herald and The National) said it was the "best thing [she had] seen all year", and "surely the best thing the ingenious Shearsmith and Pemberton have done". Bennion (The Independent) finished his review of the episode by saying that Inside No. 9 was "one of the best pieces of British television in years", and, in a review in i, the episode was described as "unmissably good". After the conclusion of the second series, Victoria Segal and Julia Raeside, writing in The Sunday Times, described "The 12 Days of Christine" as "emotionally affecting and brilliantly crafted", highlighting it as the strongest episode in the series.

David Chater, writing in The Times, said "The 12 Days of Christine" was "not quite perfect", as the "spooky" elements suggested that the writers "may have spent more time with The League of Gentlemen and Psychoville than is strictly healthy". Nonetheless, he felt that "the episode is a distillation of accurate observation that says more about the hope, messiness and disappointment of life in half an hour than most dramas say over an entire series". There was, he thought, "something infinitely poignant" about the way the episode showed the difference between what could have been and what was.

For Bennion, it was "a credit to the two creators that they can pack in such a depth of emotion into 29 minutes". Similarly, Wilson praised the writers for achieving "genuine poignancy" in half an hour, and critics in the Metro said that the episode "packs more drama and suspense into 30 minutes than many a five-part series". Mulkern said the episode was a "superb piece of drama, imbued with an increasing sense of dread". The story's ending was praised, with Dessau saying that "One of the skills of actor/writers Reece Shearsmith and Steve Pemberton is the way they plant seeds and gradually leak out details. They do it so expertly here that one really doesn't see what is coming." McDowall expressed a similar thought, saying that the "writers so cleverly threw us off the scent, making the eventual realisation so agonising". Wilson called the ending "devastating and unforeseen".

Bennion praised the performances of Smith and Riley, but said that Smith was "undoubtedly" the star of the show. Vicki Power, writing for the Daily Telegraph, agreed that Smith was the star, calling her "brilliant", while Patrick Mulkern, writing for Radio Times, said that Smith offered "another multi-faceted, stunning performance as the troubled Christine". Chater said that Smith's role was "superbly performed, as always", and Billen said that Smith offered "tragic depth" to her character. Wilson commended Smith's "arresting performance", saying that "No one does girl-next-door naturalism better – she has the actor's elixir of making you think you know her, just by a smile or an inflection." Dessau commended the writers for allowing other actors to play the lead roles, praising the performances of Riley and, especially, Smith.

Critics commended the episode's music, with Mulkern comparing the use of "Con te partirò" in "The 12 Days of Christine" to its use in Benidorm, in which Pemberton starred, but noted that in "The 12 Days of Christine" it was used "with devastating effect". Ellen E Jones, writing in The Independent, said that the song "was deployed on the soundtrack to devastating effect – we'll be humming it uneasily for another 12 days to come." Writers for i said that viewers would be "mournfully humming" the song "for 12 days to come".
