= Eve Austin =

English actress

- Born: Nottingham
- Occupation: Actress
- Years active: 2014–present
- Television: You

Eve Austin is a British stage, television and film actress from Nottingham, England. She plays a main role as Jeannie in the 2024 TV drama series This Town.

== Early life and education ==
Eve Austin was born in Nottingham. She was a member of the Central Junior Television Workshop.

== Career ==
Austin began her screen career in 2014. She appeared in BBC Three television series In The Flesh that year, and later had appearances in long-running daytime soap opera Doctors and crime drama Fearless. She played Neisha from 2018 to 2019 in the "teenventure" series The Athena, set in a fashion school. Billed as Eve Gordon for her early work, she also appeared in the Nana's Party episode of Inside No. 9. She also had a role as Tabitha in ITV soap opera Emmerdale.

She appeared as Betty Barnard in The ABC Murders, an adaptation of the Agatha Christie novel starring John Malkovich as Hercule Poirot in 2018. She played Kay in the 2019 film Our Ladies. That year, she received a nomination in the BroadwayWorld UK Awards in the "best actress in a new production of a play" category, for her role as Bex in during a UK tour of Sophie Ellerby's LIT.

She played Gemma in the fourth series of Netflix crime drama You. Austin has a main role as Jeannie in 2024 Steven Knight series This Town for BBC One.

== Filmography ==
Key
†	Denotes works that have not yet been released

Year	Title	Role	Notes
2014	In The Flesh	Frankie	As Eve Gordon
2014	Inside No. 9	Katie	Episode: Nana's Party. As Eve Gordon
2014–2016	Doctors	Chloe Turner	As Eve Gordon
2016	Casualty	Jennifer Deans	As Eve Gordon
2017	Fearless	Linda Simms	
2017	Emmerdale	Tabitha Taylor-Rudd	2 episodes
2018–2019	The Athena	Neisha	25 episodes
2018	The ABC Murders	Betty Barnard	3 episodes
2018	Print	Jenny	2 episodes
2019	Our Ladies	Kay	Film
2023	You	Gemma	6 episodes
2023	Midsomer Murders	Harper Havergal	1 episode
2024	This Town	Jeannie	6 episodes
