= Kath Hughes =

Welsh actress

- Born: 10 October 1988 (age 37)
- Occupations: Actress; writer; comedian
- Years active: 2014–present
- Known for: Gein's Family Giftshop, Tarot
- Television: Drunk History; Content; After Life; Everyone Else Burns

Kath Hughes (born 10 October 1988) is a Welsh actress, writer and comedian. She is known for portraying the role of Coleen in the British comedy drama series After Life and for being part of the comedy sketch groups Gein's Family Giftshop and Tarot.

== Life and career ==
Prior to acting, Hughes worked as an assistant editor on various short films, including Shed and Trauma, as a production co-ordinator on the film The Zombie King and as a production manager for the mini-series Legends of Old. Hughes was a member of the comedy sketch group Gein's Family Giftshop, alongside Kiri Pritchard-McLean, Adam Scott-Rowley and Edward Easton. They have created and starred in a number of short films and comedy sketches and were nominated for Best Newcomer at the Edinburgh Comedy Awards in 2014 and the Chortle Awards in 2015. Hughes also provided the voiceover for a Sour Patch Kids advert. In 2015, Hughes made her solo acting debut in the BBC black comedy series Inside No. 9, portraying a caller in the episode "Cold Comfort". Between 2016 and 2017, she appeared as various characters in the Comedy Central series Drunk History.

In 2018, Hughes portrayed Laura in an episode of the Sky Atlantic comedy Sally4Ever and Miriam in the television sitcom Zapped. In 2019, Hughes appeared as a supermarket checkout assistant in the first series of the Netflix black-comedy drama After Life. Her character was later established as Coleen, who returns as a regular character in the third series as a new hire at the Tambury Gazette. Hughes also made guest appearances in Years and Years, The End of the F***ing World and Tourist Trap before portraying Hetty in the online comedy series Content, a sitcom following the employees of a digital agency. Hughes also appeared in an episode of the Channel 4 series The Joy of Missing Out, and the short films Petrichor and Pedwar, the latter of which she co-wrote. In 2022, she had a recurring role as Jennifer in the BBC One comedy The Other One and appeared in the Channel 4 series Everyone Else Burns later in the year.

== Filmography ==
=== Film ===
Year	Title	Role	Notes	Ref.
2014	Gein's Family Giftshop: Number 1/I Am the Law	Unknown	Short film	
2017	CTRL Z	Carrie	Short film	
2021	Pedwar	Unknown	Short film; also writer	
2023	Pobl Bachyn	Kath	Short film; also writer	
2023	Seekers	Pollux	Short film	
2025	Bridget Jones: Mad About the Boy	Valerie (Floor Manager)		

=== Television ===
Year	Title	Role	Notes	Ref.
2015	Sky Comedy Christmas Shorts	Kath	Series 1; episode 10: "Gein Family Giftshop's Christmas"	
2015	Inside No. 9	Caller (voice)	Series 3; episode 4: "Cold Comfort"	
2016–2017	Drunk History	Various roles	Series 2; episodes 5 & 7, & series 3; episode 4	
2017	Summer Comedy Shorts	Unknown	Mini-series; episode 7: "Emma Sidi's Summer: Last Resort"	
2018	Sally4Ever	Laura	Episode 4	
2018	Zapped	Miriam	Series 3; episode 6: "Amulet"	
2019	After Life	Supermarket Assistant	Series 1; episode 1	
2019	Pitching In	Mrs. Llewellyn	Episode 3	
2019	Years and Years	Woman in Blue	Mini-series; episode 1	
2019	The End of the F***ing World	Headmistress	Series 2; episode 1	
2019	Tourist Trap	Jo	Series 2; episode 4: "Wellbeing"	
2019	Content	Hetty	Series regular; episodes 1–6	
2019	The Joy of Missing Out	Unknown	Episode 1: "Lindsey and the Cats"	
2020–2021	Petrichor	Spain	Mini-series	
2022	After Life	Coleen	Series 3; episodes 2–6	
2022	The Other One	Jennifer	Series 2; episodes 2–4	
2022	Marriage	Claire	Episodes 1 & 2	
2022	Don't Hug Me I'm Scared	Fax Machine (voice)	Episode 1: "Jobs"	
2023	Everyone Else Burns	Sid	Series 1; episodes 1–3	
2023	Breeders	Babs	Series 4; episode 3: "No Age"	
2024	Murder for Dummies	Detective Plank	Mini-series; episodes 2, 3, 5 & 6	
2025	Death Valley	Linda Humphreys	Episode 4	
