= Wings of Love (Pearson) =

Painting by Stephen Pearson

Wings of Love (c. 1972) is a painting by English artist Stephen Pearson. It has been hailed variously as a classic product of 70s popular culture, and as a well-known example of kitsch.

== Description ==
The painting depicts a muscular naked man being delivered to a callipygian naked woman on the wing-tip of a gigantic swan. The swan was "cemented in the imagination as a creature of romance for a whole generation of impressionable working class suburban kids". The anthropomorphic projection may not have been entirely random; swans are believed to take a mate for life, and the graceful white birds might symbolize monogamous felicity.

== Artist ==
Stephen Pearson was born in Yorkshire and studied painting in London and northern England, but referred to himself as self-taught. He listed his influences as Caravaggio, Turner, and other artists concerned with representation of light in its most dramatic forms. Among contemporary painters, he was most influenced by the surrealists, but ultimately rejected the negative content of much of their work and focused instead on romantic fantasies. Pearson worked in oils and pastels and occasionally watercolors and gouache to create "quasi-pornographic, quasi-religious dreamscapes". He exhibited in London and provincial cities, and gained a worldwide reputation from the widespread reproduction of his work. He died in March 2003.

== Reproduction ==
After the Second World War, shops such as Woolworths sold large numbers of colorful and sentimental or 'exotic' prints. As a commercially reproduced picture, Wings of Love was sold ready-framed in many high street outlets, and became a best-selling image in the early 1970s. By 1992, 2.5 million copies of Wings of Love had been sold, many outside of the UK.

The most notable appearance of Wings of Love was in a mural commissioned for a wall beside one of Saddam Hussein's many swimming pools in his palace. The mural was recreated in the form of a projection on the wall of the Platform Arts Gallery, Belfast, in February 2009. In the exhibition ‘Taste: The New Religion’, at Manchester's Cornerhouse Arts Centre, Wings of Love finds a place beside pictures by Vladimir Tretchikoff, John Lynch and Peter Lightfoot as an example of the independent course of popular taste. Andrea Patrick Byrne, an award-winning London-based artist, references Wings of Love in her 2014 audiovisual self-portrait Girlhood.

== Popular culture ==
The print house Athena owed much of its resurgence in the 1980s to selling kitsch prints of a fantasy-world type, such as Unicorn Princess, Beach Lovers and A Dolphin Moon, that were inspired by Stephen Pearson's work. Wings of Love was immortalized on the wall of Stan and Hilda Ogden's house in Coronation Street and the painting also achieved cult status through its appearance in the 1977 film of Mike Leigh's play Abigail's Party, In the film, the painting provokes a heated debate on the nature of "erotic art"; this culminates in Beverly Moss's husband Laurence dropping dead of a heart attack. The film Mona Lisa also features Wings of Love as part of recurring references to surrealism.
