= La Couchette =

- Inside No. 9 episode
- A poster for "La Couchette", with the tagline "In deuxième classe, everyone can hear you scream..."
- Episode no.: Series 2 Episode 1
- Directed by: Guillem Morales
- Written by: Steve Pemberton; Reece Shearsmith
- Original air date: 26 March 2015

Guest appearances
- Julie Hesmondhalgh as Kath; Mark Benton as Les; Jessica Gunning as Shona; Jack Whitehall as Hugo; George Glaves as Yves

Episode chronology
← Previous "The Harrowing"	Next → "The 12 Days of Christine"

"La Couchette" is the first episode of the second series of British dark comedy anthology Inside No. 9. Written by Steve Pemberton and Reece Shearsmith and directed by Guillem Morales, the episode is set in a sleeper carriage on a French train. English doctor Maxwell, who is traveling to an important job interview, climbs into bed. He is disturbed first by drunk, flatulent German Jorg, and then by English couple Kath and Les. Later, while the others sleep, Australian backpacker Shona brings posh English backpacker Hugo back to the cabin, but the pair make a surprising discovery. The episode stars Pemberton, Shearsmith, Julie Hesmondhalgh, Mark Benton, Jessica Gunning, Jack Whitehall and George Glaves.

The story was inspired by the intimacy of sleeper carriages, in which people aim to sleep in close proximity to strangers. "La Couchette" draws upon the literary tropes associated with stories, such as Murder on the Orient Express and Strangers on a Train, following characters unknown to one another while travelling. The various characters—played by actors somewhat typecast—correspond to British comedy archetypes, and much of the episode's story and humour derives from the characters' unlikability. Critics responded positively to "La Couchette", commending the cast and script, but noted that Inside No. 9 is something of an acquired taste. On its first showing, the episode was watched by 1.1 million viewers (6.1% of the audience).

== Production and development ==
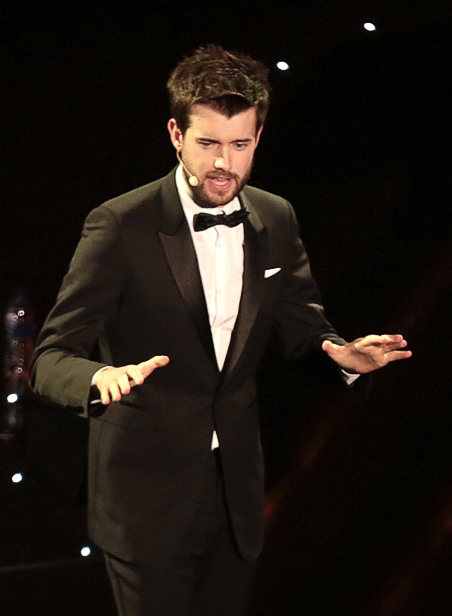
"La Couchette" stars Jack Whitehall (pictured, 2015), a fan of the first series of Inside No. 9, as the posh backpacker Hugo.

The second series of Inside No. 9 was written in 2014, and then filmed from the end of 2014 into early 2015. As each episode features new characters, the writers were able to attract actors who might have been unwilling to commit to an entire series. Jack Whitehall, who was a fan of the show, says that he "may or may not have nagged Reece and Steve to find a Jack Whitehall-shaped hole in the second series", and was "very thankful" when they did. In addition to Pemberton, Shearsmith and Whitehall, "La Couchette" stars Julie Hesmondhalgh, Mark Benton, Jessica Gunning and George Glaves. Hesmondhalgh commended the cast, saying that, for her, it was a "no brainer" to appear in the episode. For Whitehall, working with Hesmondhalgh was "very exciting, but also quite weird", given the then-recent suicide of Hesmondhalgh's Coronation Street character, Hayley Cropper. Whitehall called Benton and Hesmondhalgh "an amazing little double act". The pair had previously played a husband and wife on the radio.

"La Couchette" follows six characters on a sleeper carriage travelling from Paris to Bourg St. Maurice. Shearsmith said that the writers aimed to exploit the intimacy of the setting; the unusual situation which is created by trying to sleep in what is potentially a room full of strangers. This was, for Shearsmith, an "odd frisson" to play with. Discussing the filming, Whitehall said that the set was "definitely the most intimate location I have ever been on ... It's all on springs so it moves around like a train carriage – and I suffer from very bad motion sickness so on the first day I threw up. I had to literally run off the set half way through a scene and throw up in the loo. So it was quite an auspicious start." Hesmondhalgh also commented on the intimacy of the filming, saying that it was the tightest location used for Inside No. 9 since "Sardines", the first episode of the first series. Nonetheless, she had "such a fun week" filming the episode, noting that, despite the limited space on-set, it is "amazing how quickly you become institutionalised". Similarly, Pemberton noted that the filming resulted in "a tough week", but that it was "really fun, because it's a very fun episode".

Prior to filming, director Guillem Morales worked hard on a story board. For Shearsmith, the small space added to the need to meticulously plan the production process; he explained that every shot was worked out in advance. The set, which was situated in Twickenham Studios for the filming, was shaken manually by an assistant director to create the effect of motion; something which surprised Hesmondhalgh. The production crew filmed the episode by removing walls from the "carriage" one at a time, and shooting from the various angles, meaning that they had to effectively dismantle and reassemble the set five times. Benton noted that the tight space created a challenge for the camera crews, but, for the actors, it was "great".

== Plot ==
9A	9D
9B	9E
9C	9F
A pictorial representation of the bunks in couchette #9, as seen from the door.

Maxwell (Shearsmith), an English doctor, settles into bunk 9E while travelling from Paris to Bourg-Saint-Maurice. Maxwell is disturbed first by Jorg (Pemberton), a drunk, flatulent German who climbs into bunk 9D, then by Kath (Hesmondhalgh) and Les (Benton), a couple en route to their daughter's wedding. Jorg is in Les's bed, but the couple climb into 9A. Shona (Gunning), an Australian backpacker, enters; she places her bag on bunk 9C then leaves, and Maxwell closes the door. Kath and Les, laughing at Maxwell, begin to undress on the bed. Les wakes Jorg, but understanding is limited until Maxwell translates. Jorg switches to 9F and Les climbs into 9D.

Hours later, Shona re-enters the room with the English trustafarian Hugo (Whitehall). The pair sit on 9C and share a can of Carling while swapping travel stories. Hugo says he would rather stay in this carriage than in first class, and the pair begin foreplay. A face appears from 9B, and a man (Glaves) falls to the floor. (Note: Cast listings name the man "Yves", though the character's name is not revealed in the episode.) The carriage's inhabitants wake. Maxwell confirms that the man is dead, then leaves to look for a guard. Jorg finds a family photo in the man's pocket. Maxwell returns alone, and Jorg suggests they use the emergency stop button. Les prepares to smash the glass. Hugo stops him, confessing he is ticketless. Maxwell says he has an interview with the WHO in the morning, and Les, to Kath's annoyance, confesses that he does not want to risk missing the wedding. Maxwell explains the situation to Jorg, Les and Kath argue, and Shona refuses to let Hugo back into her bunk. Maxwell gives Jorg some tablets for his constipation, after which Shona offers a eulogy. The body is placed into 9B, and Hugo climbs into the same bunk. The passengers settle, but Kath lies sleepless.

After dawn, Les accidentally wakes Maxwell, but sees that Kath is absent. The train brakes, waking everyone, and Hugo and the corpse fall to the floor. Maxwell guesses that Kath has stopped the train as Jorg stands, dropping his trousers. Maxwell next guesses that Kath has jumped in front of the train, and Les repeatedly hits him with a pillow as Jorg defecates into Kath's shoebox, which is held by Hugo. Shona sees that the train has hit a deer, and Kath re-enters.

Later, Maxwell is dressed, and Hugo enters, wearing one of Shona's T-shirts. He says that Jorg is cleaning himself. Kath and Les talk; the latter feels remorse, and Kath insists they attend the dead man's funeral, after the wedding. Shona and Hugo leave the carriage; they intend to go "exploring" together. Maxwell says his goodbyes to Kath and Les, then, alone, receives a call from his driver, who is waiting for him and Dr Meyer. Maxwell turns to the body and says he is "terribly sorry", but there can only be "one candidate". As he says Meyer's name, Jorg, now smartly dressed, answers. Jorg explains that he is Dr Meyer, and that he is traveling to the same interview. As Jorg leaves the carriage, Maxwell looks at the corpse in silence, horrifically realising that he has murdered the wrong man.

== Analysis ==
"La Couchette", like "Sardines"—the first episode of the previous series—introduces characters gradually, and explores "man's capacity to behave idiotically within a confined space to creepy and comic effect". The sleeper carriage setting is, like the wardrobe of "Sardines", a claustrophobic environment into which the various characters are forced. For comedy critic Bruce Dessau, though the setup was similar, "La Couchette" was "maybe more comic, less sinister, but the denouement is no less nightmare-inducing".

The sleeper carriage setting gave Shearsmith and Pemberton a number of "traumatic" elements to exploit, such as claustrophobia, proximity to strangers, motion, and the various elements associated with settling down to sleep, such as flatulence and getting undressed. These characteristics led to elements typical of Pemberton and Shearsmith's work—characteristics of what The Guardian critic Sam Wollaston calls "Shearsmith'n'Pembertonism"—including "macabre horror, stiff-handling, cadaver spooning" and multiple twists. Commentators stressed how the characters are generally not particularly likable people, and one critic observed that the actors are somewhat typecast; "Hesmondhalgh was frumpy but compassionate, while Whitehall played yet another clueless, posh student". The characters are mostly archetypes of British comedy—such as "the rude German traveller" and "the British snob"—and the norms of these archetypes are used for both humour and to advance the plot. The archetypes are gradually unspun; for instance, the apparently well-meaning Les is revealed as somewhat xenophobic. The discovery of the body reveals the humanity of the various characters. For instance, Jorg is revealed to be more ill than vulgar, and Hugo is shown to be poor. Maxwell's character, by contrast, is not subverted.

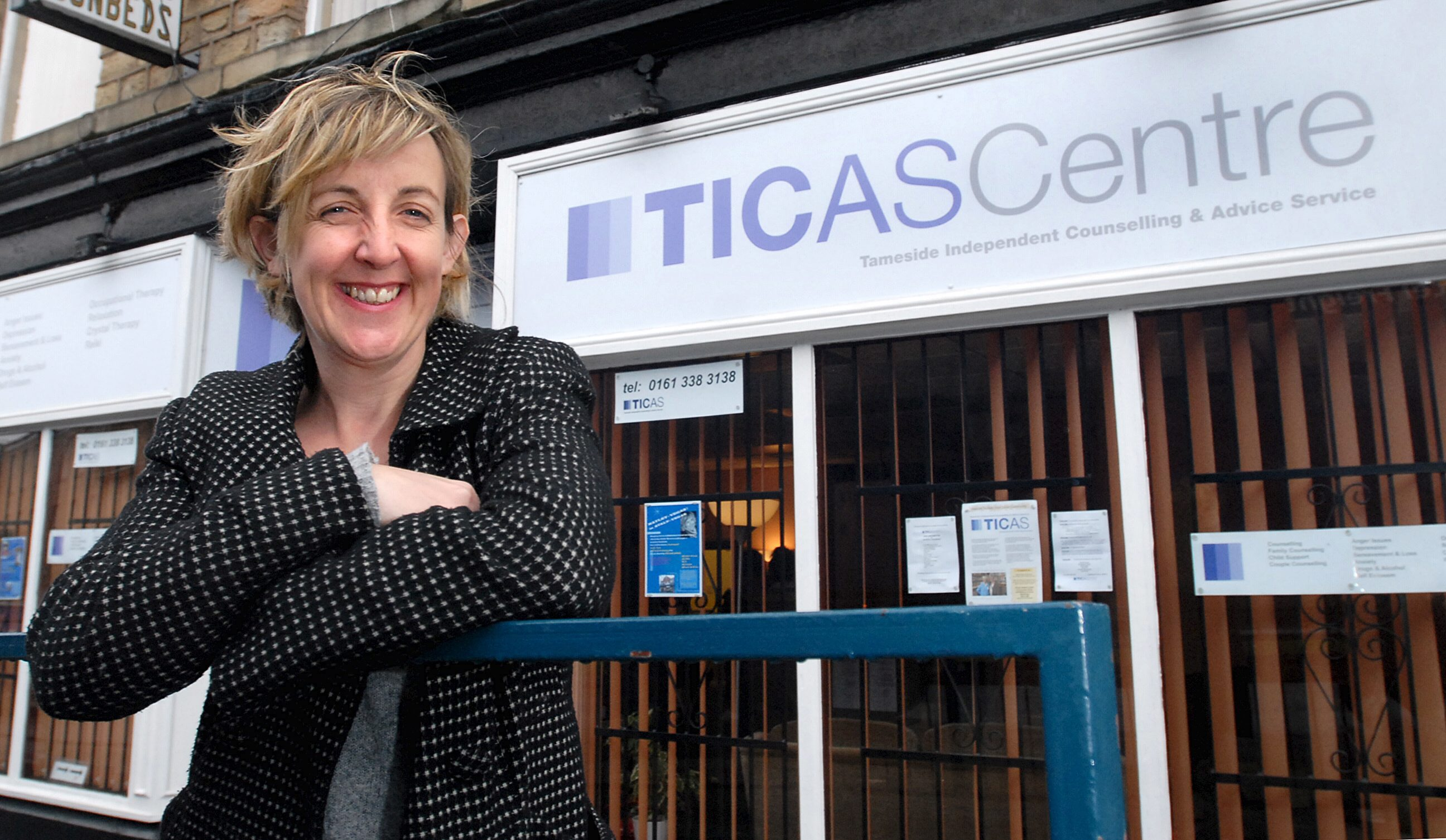
Julie Hesmondhalgh (pictured, 2008) was typecast as the "frumpy but compassionate" Kath

Maxwell, as a character, "controls the action". He is the protagonist, and traps the viewer into the coach in the opening seconds of the episode by closing the curtains. This is a reversal of the way that, in the theatre, the opening of curtains brings the viewer into the story. As the translator, he acts as the only link between Jorg and the other characters; furthermore, as the episode does not have subtitles, he acts as the link between Jorg and Anglophone viewers. Revelations about the character are seeded in a different way to other characters. His profession and supply of medication bring to mind "upper-class gentleman serial killers" or "cut-glass accented British actors brought in to play cold killers in Hollywood cinema". The revelation that Maxwell is a murderer is "a satisfying payoff for those who've figured it out", but in the final twist—Jorg's identity—control is taken from Maxwell and, therefore, the audience.

Euan Ferguson identified Roald Dahl and Hitchcock as clear influences, and Ellen E Jones, writing in The Independent, saw a Hitchcockian element in addition to Inside No. 9's usual gothic horror influences. Wollaston described the episode as a mix of Dahl's Tales of the Unexpected, Agatha Christie's Murder on the Orient Express and Chris Donald's Viz. Dessau compared the episode's scenario to "one of those old Peter Cushing portmanteau horror yarns". Phoebe Jane-Boyd, writing for entertainment website Den of Geek, identified Murder on the Orient Express, Hitchcock's Strangers on a Train and John Hughes's Planes, Trains and Automobiles as plot influences. The writers, she claimed, were able to utilise and subvert viewer expectations of the "strangers on a train" plot tropes, including bad manners, suspense and potential murder.

== Reception ==
External videos
- "Wrong bed" Les and Kath try encourage Jorg to switch beds, but encounter a language barrier. Maxwell, frustrated by the noise, translates.

"La Couchette" was well received by television critics, and was awarded four out of five stars by Gabriel Tate (The Daily Telegraph) and Andrew Billen (The Times). It was described as "beautifully, beautifully dark, and guiltily funny" by Euan Ferguson, writing in The Guardian, as "a delight" by Billen and as "a tightly worked farce" by Gerard Gilbert of The Independent. For Paddy Shennan of the Liverpool Echo, the episode was "typically inventive and inspired". Boyd felt that the episode was "a really clever opening to the series, and a solid start to another run of surprises from Inside No. 9".

Jonathan Wright, writing in The Guardian, commended the script of "La Couchette", calling it "a delight, with one line delivered by Jack Whitehall quite possibly the most gloriously tasteless you'll hear on television all year". Ferguson offered a similar view, saying that Whitehall delivered "seriously undeliverable lines with entirely believable gusto". Tate said that though he found the revelation at the end of the episode fairly predictable, the "writing and performances were so engaging that it hardly mattered". The episode was, for him, "inventive" and "deliciously wicked". Similarly, though Billen considered the setting fairly unoriginal and the characters stereotypical, he said that the writers "scored a laugh every few seconds and then a home run with a savage resolution". Patrick Mulkern, writing for Radio Times, described "La Couchette" as "hilarious" and "sharply observed". He commended the cast, saying that Pemberton and Shearsmith "give a mini-masterclass" in their performances. Jones called the episode "toilet humour with a twist", saying that "It was Jorg's grunting and squatting that produced the episode's impressively grotesque climax, but it was Whitehall as Hugo who followed up with the instantly quotable line: 'We're going to need a bigger box!'" Billen commended the cast, and Christine Brandel, writing for entertainment website PopMatters, described Gunning as one of the stand-out guest stars of the second series.

Wollaston, who reviewed the episode for The Guardian, observed that humour generally is extremely personal, and said that he "never really got Shearsmith and Pemberton's stuff". He said he could appreciate the narrative and artistry of "La Couchette", and could understand why others found it funny, but that he does not love Inside No. 9, and that, when watching, he is "just not laughing". A viewer unimpressed with the episode wrote to The Times. Disagreeing with Billen's review, the reader claimed that the episode's "puerile humour [was as] flatulent as its one-dimensional figures".

"La Couchette" was watched by 1.1 million viewers, which was 6.1% of the audience. This was slightly higher than "Sardines", the first episode of the first series, which was watched by 1.05 million (5.7% of the audience).
