= Dan Zeff =

British TV director & writer

Dan Zeff is a BAFTA Award-winning British TV director and writer currently living and working in the UK.

He works across drama and comedy. Recent work includes the highly acclaimed Inside No. 9 episodes "The Trial of Elizabeth Gadge" and "Séance Time", the BBC3 comedy series Siblings and The Ice Cream Girls, an award-winning three-part psychological thriller for ITV.

His drama credits include the critically acclaimed BBC4 film Hattie (the highest rating show in BBC4's history), Lost in Austen for ITV and the 2-part Case Histories – an adaptation of Kate Atkinson's When Will There Be Good News? starring Jason Isaacs, which won the Scottish Bafta for Best Television Drama in 2011.

He also directed an episode of the 2006 series of Doctor Who, entitled "Love & Monsters".

His comedy credits include the opening series of Siblings, Pramface, Ideal and The Worst Week of My Life, all of which were successfully recommissioned for further series.

His work has won three BAFTA awards, and a further five BAFTA nominations.
