= On the Wings of Love =

On the Wings of Love may refer to:

- "On the Wings of Love" (song), by Jeffrey Osborne, 1982
- "On the Wings of Love", a song by Westlife, a B-side of the single "I Have a Dream", 1999
- On the Wings of Love (TV series), a 2015 Philippine television series
- The Bachelor: On the Wings of Love, a season of the American reality TV series The Bachelor
- "On the Wings of Love" (Twin Peaks), a television episode

== See also ==
- On Wings of Love, a 1957 Japanese film
