= Abigail's Party =

1977 play by Mike Leigh

- Abigail's Party UK DVD cover
- Original language: English
- Written by: Mike Leigh
- Characters: Beverley Moss; Laurence Moss; Tony Cooper; Angela Cooper; Susan Lawson

Premiere
- Date: April 1977
- Place: Hampstead Theatre, London

Abigail's Party is a play for stage and television, devised and directed in 1977 by Mike Leigh. It is a suburban situation comedy of manners, and a satire on the aspirations and tastes of the new middle class that emerged in Britain in the 1970s. The play developed in lengthy improvisations during which Mike Leigh explored the characters with the actors, but did not always reveal the incidents that would occur during the play. The production opened in April 1977 at the Hampstead Theatre, and returned after its initial run in the summer of 1977, for 104 performances in all. A recording was arranged at the BBC as a Play for Today, produced by Margaret Matheson for BBC Scotland and transmitted in November 1977.

== Performances ==
The stage play was first performed at London's Hampstead Theatre on 18 April 1977, enjoying great success, leading to a revival over the summer of that year, which was another sellout.

The television version was abridged from over two hours to 104 minutes; the record played by Beverley in the original stage production was "Light My Fire" by José Feliciano and in the TV production it was the 1976 hit "Forever and Ever" by Demis Roussos – Leigh had to replace nearly all the music with artists recorded on British labels, for copyright reasons, in case the BBC sold the play to the United States. As José Feliciano became Demis Roussos, so Elvis Presley gave way to Tom Jones. Other music used in the BBC production included "Love to Love You Baby" by Donna Summer (sung by Clare Torry) and a piece of library music by Robert Farnon entitled "Blue Theme".

The BBC version was a film of a play, rather than a film in its own right, about which Leigh commented:

The first thing I'd say is, this is not a film. And not only that: for a film-maker, it's a work of deep embarrassment and pain. There is no piece of work for which I have been responsible as director by which I'm embarrassed, apart from Abigail's Party. Not for the play or its content [...] It is a stage play that was wheeled into a television studio. It's slightly compromised as a play, but not too seriously. However, as a piece of craft, it's simply appalling.

== Original cast ==
The original production starred Alison Steadman as Beverley, and Tim Stern as her husband Laurence. They are holding a drinks party for their new neighbours, Angela (Janine Duvitski) and her husband Tony (John Salthouse). They also invite Susan (Thelma Whiteley), another neighbour. Abigail herself is never seen—she is Susan's 15-year-old daughter, who is holding her first teenager party next door. For the television version, the original cast reprised their roles, with the exception of Thelma Whiteley, who was replaced by Harriet Reynolds.

Each of the original cast largely devised the back story to their character. John Salthouse brought his early career as a footballer with Crystal Palace to that of Tony. According to Leigh, discussions at the improvised sessions included whether Beverley's name should have a third "e" or not. The most complex relationship was worked out between Angela and Tony. Little of this is disclosed during the narrative, although something of it becomes apparent when Angela steps in to care first for Sue, then the stricken Laurence, and the centre of power between the couple starts to shift noticeably.

== Characters ==
Beverley Moss
An ex-department store cosmetics demonstrator, "a quondam beautician", she has failed her driving test three times. During the play, she flirts with Tony and is always trying to impress her guests. She considers her taste in music (Jose Feliciano/Demis Roussos, Tom Jones) and art (kitsch erotica) to be every bit as good as that of her husband. Immensely proud of her home, she nonetheless admits that she cannot use the gadgets in her kitchen. Throughout the evening, Beverley offers her guests drinks and cigarettes (despite the fact that Tony and Angela have recently given up), which they usually refuse but end up taking due to her being unable to take no for an answer. Beverley effectively forces her guests to agree with her on most topics, for instance on the music they should listen to, or whether olives should be served, in each instance using their apparent consensus to score points with her husband. Despite her "sophisticated" tastes and carefully groomed appearance, she was described by Alan Bennett as having "shoulders like a lifeguard, and a walk to match." According to the critic Michael Coveney, "Beverley is undoubtedly a monster. But she is also a deeply sad and vulnerable monster... The whole point about Beverley is that she is childless, and there is a sense in which that grotesque exterior carapace is a mask of inner desolation."

Interviewed in 2012, Steadman said of the play, "Overnight, that piece was incredibly powerful. ... They were very strong, identifiable characters. We laugh at them because we say, 'Oh my God, I know that person, thank goodness I'm not like that', and you cringe, but you know they're true. We can safely sit in the comfort of our living rooms or theatre seats and laugh our heads off. But we've perhaps all got a bit of Beverley in us." In a 2017 piece written for The Guardian, Leigh described Beverley as "an aspirational working class girl who is totally preoccupied with appearances and received notions of behaviour and taste. A bundle of contradictions, she espouses the idea of people freely enjoying themselves, yet endlessly bullies everybody into doing what she wrongly thinks they'll enjoy, or what is good for them. But, while she may be perceived as monstrous, she is in fact vulnerable, insecure and sad".
Laurence Moss
Estate agent with "Wibley Webb". Laurence is Beverley's husband, and the pair frequently argue. He aspires to the finer things in life: leather-bound Shakespeare (which he thinks "can't be read"), prints of Van Gogh and Lowry paintings, and Beethoven, which he forces on his guests at unfortunate moments. He seems powerless to compete with Beverley's more flamboyant persona, and compensates by working too much, as his wife points out on several occasions. He considers a brisk handshake to be correct etiquette after a dance. While Laurence starts off behaving normally during the party, as he becomes increasingly hen-pecked by his wife, he begins to act in a more neurotic manner, to the point where he too becomes an annoyance to his guests. Unlike Sue, Laurence does not embrace the increasing "cosmopolitanism" of the area.
Tony Cooper
Tony works in computing—merely as a computer operator, his wife twice points out—and used to play professional football for Crystal Palace but it "didn't work out". Tony is quiet throughout most of the play, appearing tense, uneasy and only able to give one-word answers. As the scene progresses, he becomes increasingly irate and fierce-tempered, particularly with his wife Angela. Beverley flirts with him, much to Laurence's suppressed annoyance, and at one point, Beverley asks Angela if he is violent. "No, he's not violent. Just a bit nasty. Like, the other day, he said to me, he'd like to sellotape my mouth. And that's not very nice, is it?". Leigh later attributed Tony's aggression to an underlying shyness and self-consciousness. The surname Cooper was not mentioned in the original script or teleplay, and is taken from a picture on the Mike Leigh at the BBC DVD box set.
Angela Cooper
Tony's wife. A nurse, Angela appears meek and somewhat childlike, dim, and cheerfully tactless. She and Tony have just bought their house and are struggling with the necessary frugality. She cannot drive: Tony does not wish her to do so, possibly to curtail any ideas of independence even though he seems to find her a constant irritant. Angela displays an unexpectedly practical and decisive side when Sue feels queasy and later after Laurence collapses. Mike Leigh has noted that "underneath Angela's apparent silliness is the tough, practical reliability of an experienced working nurse".
Susan Lawson
Sue is middle-aged and her 15-year-old daughter Abigail is holding the eponymous party. A long-standing resident she was (as pointed out by Angela) divorced at the same time the other characters were married. A quiet and conventional middle-aged woman, of "middle middle-class" rectitude, she wears a blouse and skirt compared to Bev and Angie's 'dressing up', thinking her invitation was for an informal neighbourly supper. Without the courage to break stifling social norms by refusing her hosts she tries to assauge her hunger on peanuts whilst Beverley's "little top-ups" of gin make her ill. As the evening progresses, Laurence repeatedly attempts to find common ground with her by mouthing common platitudes of what he supposes to be cultural refinement but when Beverley insists she dance with Laurence this only compounds their mutual awkwardness as she towers over him by at least 8 inches.

== Plot ==
The terrain is "the London side of Essex", "theoretical Romford" according to Leigh. Beverley Moss invites her new neighbours, Angela and Tony, who moved into the road just two weeks ago, over for drinks. She has also invited her neighbour Susan (Sue), divorced for three years, whose fifteen-year-old daughter Abigail is holding a party at home. Beverley's husband Laurence comes home late from work, just before the guests arrive. The gathering starts off in a stiff fashion as the virtual strangers tentatively gather, until Beverley and Laurence start sniping at each other. As Beverley serves more drinks and the alcohol takes effect, Beverley flirts more and more overtly with Tony, as Laurence sits impotently by. After a tirade when Beverley insists on showing off her kitsch print Wings of Love, Laurence suffers a fatal heart attack.

== Class ==
Beverley, Tony and, to a lesser extent Angela, all speak with an accent centred on Essex or Estuary English. Laurence's accent, more non-descript and less regional, makes him sound slightly more educated, while Sue's is much nearer to Received Pronunciation.

Sue represents the middle class, being the ex-wife of an architect and living in one of the older houses on the street. She also brings a bottle of wine, and has not yet eaten, indicating that she is expecting dinner, as opposed to an extended evening of drinks. The others present have already had their "tea". Beverley and Laurence represent the aspirational lower middle class, and Tony and Angela—the "new arrivals"—are also lower middle class, but Tony is less successful than Laurence.

Despite their similar background, Laurence seeks to differentiate himself from Tony by highlighting the differences in their general level of culture, and makes a couple of condescending comments directed at him, and/or for Sue's benefit. For example, Laurence shows off a leather-bound collected works of Shakespeare to Sue (which we know are unread), after pointedly asking Tony if he reads, insinuating that he does not.

== Critical response ==
In a list of the 100 Greatest British Television Programmes drawn up by the British Film Institute in 2000, voted for by industry professionals, Abigail's Party was placed 11th. It also appeared in a Radio Times poll to find the top 40 greatest TV shows on British television, published in August 2003.

Some critics, such as Tom Paulin, have responded more negatively, saying that Abigail's Party appears to represent a middle-class schadenfreude, with the only true middle-class character, Sue, looking on at the antics of the couples with disdain. Likewise, Dennis Potter wrote a critical review of the play in The Sunday Times, saying it was "based on nothing more edifying than rancid disdain, for it is a prolonged jeer, twitching with genuine hatred, about the dreadful suburban tastes of the dreadful lower middle classes". Leigh has rejected this, describing it as a tragi-comedy which is "sympathetic to all the characters, whatever their foibles, not least Beverley... The play is a lamentation, not a sneer". He has also argued that the characters (Beverley and Laurence in particular) reflected the real-life behaviour of aspiring couples in mid-1970s suburbia.

Writing in The Independent in 2002, David Thomson noted that Beverley's gauche storing of the beaujolais in the refrigerator had become standard practice; "the gaffe has turned suave".

== Revival ==
The television version was released on VHS in 1984 and DVD in 2003.

The play was staged in London's West End in 2003 with Elizabeth Berrington as Beverley. It was revived in Wolverhampton at the Grand Theatre in 2005, and at the Northcott Theatre in Exeter the following year.

Interviewed in 2009, writer Leigh said: "Of course I recognise the enduring popularity of Abigail's Party. It still hits a nerve about the way we live. It's real even though it's apparently a heightened and comic play. It's a reflection of the realities of how we live on several different levels. It's about aspirationalism and materialism, love and relationships. Like much of my work, it's about the disease I call 'the done thing'—basically, keeping up with the Joneses. It's actually quite a complex play. People may not analyse its complexity but it's so popular precisely for that reason."

In March 2012 a new revival of the play,directed by Lindsay Posner, opened at the Menier Chocolate Factory in London. Starring Jill Halfpenny as Beverley, Joe Absolom as Tony, Natalie Casey as Angela, Susannah Harker as Sue and Andy Nyman as Laurence, it subsequently transferred to Wyndham's Theatre in the West End. Commenting on the character, Halfpenny said, "To her mind Beverley isn't a monster and even warrants sympathy. "When you learn about her upbringing—her mother and father haven't spoken to her for 20 years—you see why a woman who's been brought up like that and carries so many insecurities could take them out on others."

In May 2013 Abigail's Party played at San Francisco Playhouse and received outstanding reviews.

In March 2017 a new revival of Abigail's Party opened at the Theatre Royal, Bath as a 40th anniversary production, starring Amanda Abbington as Beverley, Ciarán Owens as Tony, Charlotte Mills as Angela, Rose Keegan as Sue, and Ben Caplan as Laurence.

In November 2021 a further revival of the play opened at the Park Theatre Finsbury Park, starring Kellie Shirlie as Beverley, Matt Di Angelo as Tony and Ryan Early as Laurence.

Another UK tour took place in 2023, under the direction of Michael Cabot, starring Rebecca Birch, Jo Castleton, Alice De-Warrenne, George Readshaw and Tom Richardson.

In April 2025 a new production at the Royal Exchange, Manchester opened, starring Kym Marsh, Graeme Hawley, Tupele Dorgu, Kyle Rowe and Yasmin Taheri, under the direction of Natalie Abrahami.

From 6 September to 12 October 2024, Nadia Fall directed a London revival at the Theatre Royal Stratford East featuring television stars Tamzin Outhwaite and Kevin Bishop, alongside Ashna Rabheru, Omar Malik, and Pandora Colin. Fall's production was revived for a new tour in 2026, visiting venues including Cambridge and Brighton, before transferring to the West End's Harold Pinter Theatre with the same cast as in the 2024 production, with the exception of Lauren Patel who replaced Rabheru as Angela.

== Use in other media ==
In 1985 the pop band ABC sampled dialogue from the play, by Beverley, on a 12" remix (Abigails Party Mix) of their single "Vanity Kills" on their album How to Be a ... Zillionaire!
