= Andrew Billen =

British journalist and children's author

Andrew William Scott Billen (born 30 December 1957) is a British journalist, children's author, and staff feature writer on The Times newspaper.

== Early life ==
Andrew Billen was born in London on 30 December 1957 and brought up in Brentwood, Essex. He attended Brentwood School from 1965 to 1977, which at the time was still a direct grant grammar school. He gained a BA in English from Christ Church, Oxford in 1980.

== Career ==
Billen started on newspapers at the Sheffield Star, a daily newspaper across South Yorkshire. From 1984 he was a writer on the Times Diary for The Times and became the paper's arts correspondent in 1988. In 1989 he moved to The Observer. In 1997 he joined the London Evening Standard as chief interviewer.

He returned to The Times in 2002, where he wrote the weekly "The Andrew Billen Interview" for five years. He was the paper's main television reviewer from 2007 to 2017. For ten years up to 2007 he worked in a freelance capacity as the New Statesman′s TV critic. He later became the magazine's theatre reviewer.

In 2006 he won a prize at the Press Gazette′s Magazine Design & Journalism Awards. In 2008 he was again critic of the year in the same awards. He has been shortlisted six times for interviewer of the year in the UK Press Awards, most recently in March 2021 when he was also shortlisted for feature writer of the year. In 2020 he was shortlisted as interviewer of the year in the British Journalism Awards.

In 2022 he was presenter and reporter of a five-part Story of Our Times podcast, The Feud, about a dispute between Christ Church, Oxford and the college's dean, Martyn Percy.

== Personal life ==
He is married and lives in Oxford with his wife, Lucy, and two daughters, Abby and Orla.

== Publications ==
- Sam Johnson, The wonderful word doctor. Short Books, London.
- Who was Charles Dickens? Short Books, London, 2005. ISBN 1904977189 (republished in hardback on 5 November 2000 as The boy who invented Christmas (Short Books).)
