= The 1% Club =

British game show

- Genre: Game show
- Created by: Dean Nabarro; Andy Auerbach
- Presented by: Lee Mack
- Theme music composer: Twin Petes
- Country of origin: United Kingdom
- Original language: English
- No. of series: 5
- No. of episodes: 70

Production
- Production location: Dock10
- Running time: c. 45 minutes (excluding adverts)
- Production company: Magnum Media

Original release
- Network: ITV
- Release: 9 April 2022 – present

The 1% Club is a British game show that has been aired on ITV since 9 April 2022 and is hosted by Lee Mack. The show is based on logic, word and number puzzles. The top prize achievable is £100,000.

The first series averaged 5.3 million viewers across its span of eight episodes, whilst the second series averaged 5.4 million viewers.

== Gameplay ==
All questions used during the game are taken from a set that have been put to members of the general public prior to the show. The questions are classified by the percentage of participants who answered correctly; those with lower percentages are considered to be more difficult.

One hundred contestants are each given a £1,000 stake at the beginning of the game. Mack asks 15 questions of increasing difficulty (90% to 1%), each of which has a 30-second time limit, and the contestants secretly lock in their answers on their mobile phones or tablets. If a contestant misses a question, they are eliminated with their stake added to the final prize pot.

Upon reaching the fifth question (50%), each remaining contestant is given the option to pass on any one question except the last (1%). In order to pass, a contestant must put their £1,000 into the prize pot. Upon reaching the ninth question (30%), any contestants who have not yet used their pass may either keep their £1,000 and immediately leave the game, or continue playing; those who have used their pass must continue.

All contestants who answer the 14th question (5%) correctly or pass it, or who advance the furthest in the game if all 100 are eliminated, become finalists. They may each choose to take an equal share of £10,000 and leave the game, or attempt the 1% question. Any contestants who attempt the question and answer it correctly receive equal shares of the prize pot; those who miss it receive nothing. In addition, any contestants who reach the 1% question without using their pass or giving an incorrect answer keep their £1,000 irrespective of the outcome.

== History ==
The show was originally planned to be filmed in early 2020, but was delayed due to the COVID-19 lockdowns, not airing until April 2022.

A children's version of the show was filmed on 27 October 2025, and aired on 24 May 2026.

In November 2025, ITV released a trailer for a new edition of the show called The 1% Club Rollover. It features a new twist: anyone who makes it to the 1% question (in any of the first four out of five shows) returns the following episode in an attempt to gain more money. Also, if the jackpot is not won, it rolls over too. As such, the maximum prize that can be gained during the week quintuples (to £500,000). The series was broadcast over five consecutive nights from 8 December until 12 December 2025.

== Transmissions ==
=== Regular ===
Series	Start date	End date	Episodes
1	9 April 2022	28 May 2022	8
2	15 April 2023	10 June 2023	8
3	17 February 2024	25 May 2024	16
3	9 December 2024	12 December 2024	16
4	25 January 2025	24 May 2025	16
4	8 November 2025 (Note: On 17 May 2025, what would have been the 15th episode was not aired and replaced with a repeat. The episode eventually aired as episode 16 of series 4, partway into series 5.)		16
5	11 October 2025	TBD	TBD
6	TBA	TBA	TBA

=== Rollover ===
Series	Start date	End date	Episodes
1	8 December 2025	12 December 2025	5
2	TBA	TBA	5

=== Specials ===
Date	Special
25 December 2023	Christmas Special
26 December 2024	Christmas Special
7 June 2025	Soccer Aid Special
25 December 2025	Christmas Special
14 February 2026	Valentine's Special
24 May 2026	Kids Special
TBA	Christmas Special
TBA	New Year Special

== Awards and nominations ==
In 2023, the show won a National Television Award in the quiz/game show category.

Year	Group	Award	Result
2022	National Television Awards	Quiz Game Show	Nominated
2023	TRIC Awards	Game Show	Nominated
2023	National Television Awards	Quiz Game Show	Won
2024	National Television Awards	Quiz Game Show	Won
2025	National Television Awards	Quiz Show	Won
2026	National Television Awards	Quiz Show	Won

== International versions ==
BBC Studios holds international format and distribution rights to the series. As of February 2026, the company has licensed the series in over fifteen territories, a majority of which being produced by BBC Studios' local divisions.

Country	Name	Host(s)	TV station	Premiere	Finale	Ref(s)
Australia	The 1% Club	Jim Jefferies	Seven Network	26 April 2023	present	
France	100% Logique : la réponse est sous vos yeux	Cyril Féraud	France 2	24 September 2022	present	
France	100% Logique : entraînez-vous !	Cyril Féraud	France 2	11 November 2024	present	
France	100% Logique : entraînez-vous !	Cyril Féraud	France 2	11 November 2024	20 December 2024	
Germany	Das 1% Quiz – Wie clever ist Deutschland?	Jörg Pilawa	Sat.1	15 March 2023	present	
Greece	1% Club	Petros Polychronidis	Star	29 March 2026	present	
Hungary	Az 1% Klub – Mennyire okos Magyarország?	Tibor Kasza	TV2	15 December 2024	8 February 2026	
India	India Ke Top 1%	Anil Kapoor	StarPlus	19 September 2026	present	
Israel	האחוזון העליון; HaAkhuzon HaElyon	Shahar Hason	KAN 11	24 October 2022	present	
Italy	1% Club – La risposta è sotto i vostri occhi	Michelle Hunziker	Canale 5	2026	present	
Mexico	El Círculo del 1%	Escorpión Dorado (Alex Montiel)	Azteca Uno	9 June 2024	20 February 2025	
Netherlands	De 1% Quiz	Tijl Beckand	RTL 4	21 May 2022	1 October 2022	
Saudi Arabia	تحدي 1% Tahaadi 1%	Ibrahim Al Hajjaj	SBC	9 November 2026	present	
Spain	El 1%	Arturo Valls	Antena 3	17 April 2024	present	
Turkey	The 1% Club	TBA	TV8	TBA	TBA	
Sweden	1% Klubben	Johan Petersson	SVT	10 October 2026	present	
Ukraine	Клуб 1%	Timur Miroshnychenko	1+1 Ukraine	22 September 2024	21 December 2025	
United States	The 1% Club	Patton Oswalt	Amazon Prime Video	23 May 2024	10 September 2024	
United States	The 1% Club	Joel McHale	Fox	10 June 2025	present	

== Merchandise ==
=== Board game ===
In 2022, BBC Studios signed a licensing deal with John Adams Leisure to develop, manufacture and distribute a table-top board game based on the game show under the Ideal label. The game was released on 18 July 2023.

=== Video game ===
A video game adaption of the series, The 1% Club World Challenge, was released on iOS and Android by Barnstorm Games in February 2026, with a Nintendo Switch port releasing a month later.
