= Lee Mack's All Star Cast =

- Genre: Stand up comedy Music
- Presented by: Lee Mack
- Country of origin: United Kingdom
- Original language: English
- No. of series: 1
- No. of episodes: 6

Production
- Executive producer: Neil Webster
- Production location: BBC Television Centre
- Running time: 40 minutes

Original release
- Network: BBC One
- Release: 18 June – 23 July 2011

Lee Mack's All Star Cast is a Saturday night television programme by the BBC. Each week, host Lee Mack is joined by two celebrity guests and a live studio audience who are entertained by stand-up comedians, random sketches and various games.

== Entertainment ==
The forty-minute-long show mostly involves host Mack talking to his two or more celebrity guests from behind his desk. He always opens the show with a short monologue, poking fun at news headlines from the past week.

=== Face Game ===
Mack continues the show with an audience competition, giving them an emotion or feeling to portray. The cameras then pick out three or four people with particularly funny faces, who tell Lee Mack and the rest of the audience a story which relates to their portrayal.

=== Stand Up ===
A stand up comedian takes to the stage and entertains the audience for 4–5 minutes.

=== You Got the Look ===
A part of the show where members of the audience who think they are a lookalike of a celebrity will be interviewed by the celebrity panel. They are compared to that celebrity and the winner is later shown in an advertisement for the next week's show. This game only lasted for the first three episodes of the series which was later replaced with an exchange between members of the audience and the celebrity guests, with the audience offering an item to them.

=== The Sketch ===
This part of the show features Mack and the celebrity guests dress up in strange costumes to entertain the audience. Other celebrities that were not previously involved in the show now appear to 'act' alongside Lee.

=== When Will I be Famous? (for 15 seconds) ===
Three or four viewers at home will be shown via Skype to perform an act. They have fifteen seconds to perform, and the winner gets small crown with the number 15 on top. After all the acts have performed and been interviewed by Lee Mack.

=== Musical performance ===
To end the show, a musical act will take to the stage and perform a song to promote sales.

== Episodes ==
No.	Guests	Comedian	Sketch participant	Singer(s)	Original release date	Viewers
1	Fern Britton; Frank Skinner	Stewart Francis	Tess Daly	James Blunt	18 June 2011	4.19
2	Shane Richie; Henry Winkler	Milton Jones	Ulrika Jonsson	The Feeling featuring Sophie Ellis-Bextor	25 June 2011	3.04
3	Alice Cooper; Sarah Millican	Rita Rudner	Patsy Kensit	Kaiser Chiefs	2 July 2011	3.16
4	Rhod Gilbert; Katie Price	Danny Bhoy	Theo Paphitis	Scouting for Girls	9 July 2011	3.08
5	Joan Collins; Ross Noble	Tom Stade	Arlene Phillips	The Wanted	16 July 2011	3.04
6	Ashley Jensen; JLS	Tommy Tiernan	Emma Bunton	JLS	23 July 2011	3.05

== Promotions ==
Each week, adverts are shown in between other BBC One programmes, they feature a member of the studio audience who won the 'You Got the Look' game on the previous week's show.
