= Bradley Walsh's Million Pound Shot =

2026 one-off television show

- Promotional poster featuring Bradley Walsh
- Genre: Documentary; satire
- Directed by: Max Shapira
- Presented by: Bradley Walsh
- Composer: Paul Farrer
- Country of origin: United Kingdom
- Original language: English

Production
- Producer: Jacob Greenhalgh
- Production location: The Maidstone Studios
- Running time: 1 hour 5 minutes
- Production company: KEO Films

Original release
- Network: Channel 4
- Release: 1 November 2026

Bradley Walsh's Million Pound Shot is a satirical anti-gambling documentary. It was taped at The Maidstone Studios in Maidstone, Kent on 2 October 2026. It aired on Channel 4 on 1 November 2026, where it was simulcast on its self-titled video on-demand service.

== Production ==
Million Pound Shot was taped in Maidstone, Kent, in front of a live studio audience at The Maidstone Studios on 2 October 2026. Audience members had to sign non-disclosure agreements (NDAs) until it aired. On 21 October, free-to-air national public broadcaster Channel 4 first revealed to TV Zone UK it would air at 9pm on Sunday, 1 November, and be fronted by television personality Bradley Walsh as the host.

== Synopsis ==
To begin with, Million Pound Shot was initially presented as a regular game show and saw three contestants, Helen, Mark, and Reece, presented with the chance to win as much as £1,000,000 in front of a studio audience as they began to play along using their bank cards to bet their own money on how confident their answer was correct. Additionally, they were presented with Bet Balls; balls that held a monetary value and gave them the choice of using to take the money away, or gamble them by firing them into the Million Pound Shot Machine in hopes of winning the jackpot. The game show aspect ultimately culminated with a staged interference from an actor posing as a heckler in the audience who confronted Walsh and the crew after the main contestant, Reece, was pressured to continue gambling after suffering financial losses he could not afford to make, before fading to colour bars and cutting to an ad break. After the break, Walsh addressed the camera and revealed the production was all staged as a documentary and hoax, with the crew, including the contestants and floor manager, being made up of actors. It was then noted that main contestant Reece was based on a real individual, named Patrick. It featured insights from experts highlighting the gambling industry's manipulative tactics, and saw Walsh's script in the game show segment feature wording lifted from gambling advertisements. The live studio audience was legitimately unaware of its true nature of a hoax and television experiment.

== Authenticity ==
Ahead of its broadcast, it was ambiguously described as a "one-off quiz event" in the media. Questions were raised into its authenticity due to its high-stakes nature. It had been theorised that it could be a hoax, such as the BBC's 1992 pseudo-documentary Ghostwatch, or be of a similar premise to the Inside No. 9 episode "3 by 3", which was presented as a regular game show that went wrong. Television industry commentator Chuck Thomas drew attention to the fact it had been produced by KEO Films, a production company who create "fascinating documentaries and extraordinary stunts", and was commissioned by Tim Hancock, who previously commissioned a satirical documentary hosted by Gregg Wallace for Channel 4 titled The British Miracle Meat.

== Viewership ==
Heather Fallon of Broadcast, a broadcasting trade magazine, stated Channel 4 saw its viewership almost double in its Sunday evening slot average, as more than one million people had tuned in.

== Reception ==
Michael Hogan said in The Telegraph the show's satirical nature was "[not] the most subtle", claiming "[it was] akin to using a pneumatic drill to crack a nut."
