= Emily Grossman =

British science communicator (born 1978)

Emily Grossman (born 7 July 1978) is a science communicator and populariser, was a resident expert on The Alan Titchmarsh Show, and has been a panellist on the Sky1 television show Duck Quacks Don't Echo. She has hosted events and given lectures at a number of institutions, including the Royal Academy, the Royal Statistical Society, the Royal College of Physicians in Edinburgh, Scotland and various museums, both on science topics as well as advocating the encouragement of women in science. She has a PhD in cancer research, and contributed to the discovery of a new molecule while based at the Paterson Institute for Cancer Research.

== Personal life and career ==
Grossman has a first class degree in natural sciences from Queens' College, Cambridge and a PhD from the University of Manchester. Her father is a professor of endocrinology, and her mother is a travel and TV writer. Her parents divorced when she was four years old; she said that event caused her to take great interest in her schoolwork, which she enjoyed. She initially intended to be a physicist, but convinced herself that she was not doing as well as the male students and subsequently switched to biology. She later discovered that she had indeed been doing as well as the boys in the physics exams, and pondered what she would have done differently if she'd had a female role model or encouragement to stay in physics at the time.

In 2017, she was named one of the honorary STEM ambassadors at the STEM Inspiration Awards, for championing science education and being a role model for youth interested in related careers.

She made the decision to have some of her eggs frozen to preserve them for when she meets the person she would like to have a family with. She advocates that women considering having the procedure done do so earlier than their mid-thirties, as the success rate for younger eggs is higher.

Emily Grossman is Jewish and "honors the experiences of her ancestors" through Judaism.

== Tim Hunt controversy ==
Following the controversy involving a statement made on 8 June 2015 by British biochemist and molecular physiologist Tim Hunt about women when he said "when you criticise them they cry", Grossman stated "We desperately need to encourage more girls into science careers, and the concern is this might put them off." After speaking out on various media sources on this point, including a debate with Milo Yiannopoulos on Sky News, she was made the object of numerous sexist remarks on Twitter and YouTube.
