= Hold on Tight! (Inside No. 9) =

Fake episode of Inside No. 9

Steve Pemberton as Wolfie, Robin Askwith as Mr. Cole, and Reece Shearsmith as Clarke in a fake promotional poster for the episode.

"Hold on Tight!" is a fake episode of the British dark comedy anthology television programme Inside No. 9. Advertised to be broadcast on 18 May 2023, the episode was a hoax, tricking audiences before then broadcasting the real episode, "3 by 3", which was filmed at dock10 studios to look like a pilot quiz show hosted by Lee Mack. The hoax involved creating fake photos, an advertising poster and clips for a trailer. The episode's themes were later reprised as part of the show's finale episode "Plodding On", aired on 12 June 2024.

== Origins ==
The episode was announced as part of the reveal of details of Series 8 of Inside No. 9. A publicity photo for "Hold on Tight!" featuring the show's stars and writers Steve Pemberton and Reece Shearsmith, and guest star Robin Askwith, was used to promote the series. The episode appeared to be a parody of the 1970s ITV sitcom On the Buses, with Shearsmith playing the driver Clarke, Pemberton as conductor Wolfie, and Askwith as passenger Mr. Cole.

Inside No. 9 is set in various different locations, all of which share the number nine. Reportedly, fans of the series kept suggesting that an episode should be set on a No. 9 bus. "Hold on Tight!" appeared to be a reaction to this. The episode came with a fake synopsis which read: "Wolfie and Clarke love their bus – but perhaps not as much as the mysterious Mr Cole and his dolly-bird nieces. As Clarke would say, 'plenty of room up top!'" As part of the hoax, the BBC refused to put out a preview of the "episode" for critics to review. Sound designer Chris Mac revealed that the crew had to sign a non-disclosure agreement to prevent them legally from revealing the true nature of the episode.

== Plot of "3 by 3" ==
"3 by 3"
- Inside No. 9 episode
- Lee Mack as the host of a new game show called "3 by 3"
- Episode no.: Series 8 Episode 5
- Written by: Steve Pemberton; Reece Shearsmith
- Original air date: 18 May 2023
- Running time: 29 minutes

Guest appearances
- Lee Mack as himself; Tiajna Amayo as Maisie; James Bailey as Gavin; Kiran L Dadlani as Shindu; Gemma Page as Margaret; Mary Keegan as Enid; Ronay Poole as Bella; Jim Rastall as Niall; James Tucker as Stephen; Saskia Wakefield as Catherine

Episode chronology
| ← Previous "Love Is a Stranger" | Next → "The Last Weekend" |

Lee Mack is the host of a new general knowledge game show titled "3 by 3", where three teams of three compete to win cash prizes. The three teams are:

- the "Three Tenors": Enid, Niall, and Shindu, members of a come-and-sing choir
- the "Oakwoods": Stephen, Margaret, and Catherine, who are father, mother, and daughter
- the "Quiztopher Bigwins": Bella, Gavin, and Masie, who all work at a recruitment company

Margaret is a clinical trials manager, and Catherine plans to do an online degree in applied neuroscience.

For the first part of the first round, "3's A Crowd", each team receives an initial sum of money. Each team member is asked a trivia question, and they cannot consult their team members. If they answer wrongly, they are "frozen". After the round is over, the players who are not frozen can choose to bring back the frozen players by paying. If they are not brought back, they leave the game.

Enid and Niall answer correctly, and Shindu answers wrongly; Stephen and Margaret answer wrongly, and Catherine answers correctly; Bella, Gavin, and Masie all answer correctly. Shindu and Margaret are unfrozen. Stephen leaves the game.

The second part of the first round is a quickfire round, where every team competes against each other. They have 60 seconds to be the fastest to answer a trivia question, and the team with the least money will leave the game. The Oakwoods trail behind, but Catherine stages a comeback by answering questions before they are asked. Mack asks Catherine how she pulled it off; she responds that she has been "practicing".

The second round, "3 Point Turn", has each team selecting from the nine squares of a noughts and crosses board. Each square has a different category of trivia question. If the team answers correctly, they claim that square, and if they answer wrongly, the other team has an opportunity to steal it. The team that loses the noughts and crosses board must leave the game.

Gavin selects a question that he knows the answer to; he suddenly cannot recall the answer, and he is unable to get a wrong answer out of his head. He says the wrong answer, and Catherine answers correctly to steal the square. Catherine answers the next and winning question correctly, and a slight technical difficulty occurs. The Oakwoods win the round, and the Bigwins leave the game.

For the third and final round, "3 Blind Twice", one player enters a soundproof booth and the other stays outside. Both players are asked three questions separately. If both answer correctly, their money is tripled. If only one answers correctly, they receive their money earned after the second round. If no one answers correctly, they go home with nothing.

Catherine and Margaret both answer the first two questions correctly. For the third question, Catherine answers correctly, and Margaret answers wrongly. During the round, it is implied that Margaret has been exhibiting controlling behaviour towards Catherine, and that Catherine has telepathic powers which she has been using for the whole show.

While Mack narrates the conclusion to the show, Margaret slams the booth's door open. Catherine, using telekinesis, closes the door and traps Margaret inside. Margaret yells that "[t]he doctors were right. I should have destroyed you when you were born." Catherine then makes Margaret's head explode and blood splatters everywhere inside the booth, the audience panic and Mack runs off the stage saying "get the producers out of here no-" before it's interrupted by a loud bleeping noise, then the episode ends as 3 By 3's ending theme slowly transitions into the Inside No. 9 ending theme, revealing that 3 By 3 was just the replacement episode for Hold On Tight.

== Reaction ==
When "3 by 3" was broadcast instead of "Hold on Tight!", there were complaints on social media, with some viewers switching channels not realising that they were victims of a hoax. Others found clues to "3 by 3" as the real episode, such as the title of the episode being a product: 3 × 3 = 9. There were also references to other Inside No. 9 episodes such as "The Trial of Elizabeth Gadge".

Filmed at dock10 studios in a virtual studio, the episode was shortlisted for two Broadcast Tech Awards: Best Innovation Project and Best Use Of Virtual Production/Studios.

The hoax was compared to another similar episode of Inside No. 9, "Dead Line", which had been billed as a live episode broadcast especially for Halloween, about a man who receives phone calls from the dead, which in fact was a trick, the real story of the episode veering wildly off-course into a story about the broadcast being overrun by spirits haunting the TV studio and starring Shearsmith and Pemberton as themselves. Juliette Harrisson writing for Den of Geek argued that both of these hoaxes were an example of tricks that could only be performed on broadcast television rather than streaming services, saying that they best work when people are made to watch them at certain times as part of a schedule.

Writing on Twitter, Askwith said that being part of the hoax was, "a hard secret to keep", adding it was "interesting to watch the anger and despair turn to delight" as the real episode aired.

Some fans of Inside No. 9 remained convinced that "Hold on Tight!" was a real episode and would appear on television at some point. After Series 8 ended, BBC Two scheduled a repeat of Series 7 episode "Mr. King" to air on 1 June 2023, but some fans believed this may have been another trick and instead "Hold on Tight!" would be broadcast. Ultimately, it was "Mr. King" that was shown.

== Reprisal ==
"Hold on Tight!" was referenced in the Inside No. 9 finale, "Plodding On", which is set in a wrap party for the series and sees the actors playing versions of themselves. One scene sees Askwith in a toilet with Shearsmith, suggesting ideas to make the episode real, including writing his own script. At the end of the episode, Shearsmith and Pemberton contemplate their futures, with Shearsmith planning to continue their relationship with a police comedy drama called "Plodding On" and Pemberton getting a chance to star in an American drama for Amazon. Shearsmith suggests a third way, which leads to the episode's credits being filmed in the style of "Hold on Tight!" The credits star the main actors in "Plodding On"; Shearsmith, Pemberton, Sian Gibson, Amanda Abbington, Katherine Parkinson (with both Abbington's and Parkinson's names switched due to their likeness in appearance), Askwith, Tim Key, Rosie Cavaliero and Nick Mohammed.

== See also ==
- Bradley Walsh's Million Pound Shot, a 2026 hoax game show created to illustrate the tricks used by the gambling industry.
