= Duck Quacks Don't Echo =

- Genre: Comedy panel game
- Presented by: Lee Mack
- Starring: Simon Foster; Emily Grossman; Maggie Aderin-Pocock (S3-); David Wharton (S1-2)
- Country of origin: United Kingdom
- Original language: English
- No. of series: 6
- No. of episodes: 46

Production
- Production location: Pinewood Studios
- Running time: 60 minutes (inc. adverts)
- Production company: Magnum Media

Original release
- Network: Sky1
- Release: 7 February 2014 – 12 October 2017

Duck Quacks Don't Echo is a British television comedy panel game show that aired on Sky1 from 7 February 2014 to 12 October 2017. It was hosted by Lee Mack.

== Rounds ==
Each episode has three rounds.

- Fact Off - The three guests reveal their favourite fact and try to see if it is true. The fact proving segments are narrated by John Sergeant.
  - In Series 1 and 2, the panellists (excluding the Verifiers) scored the facts.
  - From Series 3 onwards, an average was taken from the audience.
- Fact Finder - Each of the three guests choose an audience member who has a fact which is given to three experts (also known as "The Verifiers" within the show) who reveal if the facts are true or not, as well as score them.
  - Cell biology and genetics Dr Emily Grossman
  - Rocket scientist Dr Simon Foster
  - Chemical engineer David Wharton (Series 1–2)
  - Space scientist Dr Maggie Aderin-Pocock (Series 3 onwards)
- Mack's Fact (Series 1–2) - The guest with the highest score takes part in a fact Mack wants to prove.
- Mack's Facts (Series 3 onwards) - Mack gives clues to three facts, and whoever can guess the fact gets a point.

== Episodes ==
46 episodes were produced, with the final episode of each series (the eighth episode) being a best-of compilation. The final episode for series 6 (a best-of compilation) was unaired.

=== Series 1 (2014) ===
#	Original air date	Panelists
1	7 February 2014	Melanie C (30); Dara Ó Briain (28); Ruth Jones (24)
2	14 February 2014	Olivia Colman (23); Rhod Gilbert (33); Paul Hollywood (39)
3	21 February 2014	Sue Perkins (35); Aston Merrygold(34); Bob Mortimer (30)
4	28 February 2014	Miranda Hart (35); Stephen Graham (34); Richard Ayoade (26)
5	7 March 2014	Sanjeev Bhaskar (25); Kathy Burke (32); John Hannah (35)
6	14 March 2014	Ricky Tomlinson (27); Sara Cox (25); Jon Richardson (29)
7	21 March 2014	Terry Wogan (29); Jimmy Carr (32); Carol Vorderman (23)
8	28 March 2014	

=== Series 2 (2014) ===
#	Original air date	Panelists
1 (9)	1 September 2014	Stephen Mangan (26); Davina McCall (36); Paddy McGuinness (26)
2 (10)	8 September 2014	Dara Ó Briain (18); Holly Willoughby (23); Hugh Dennis (29)
3 (11)	15 September 2014	Johnny Vegas (32); Mel Giedroyc (23); Freddie Flintoff (29)
4 (12)	22 September 2014	Richard Madeley (27); Denise Van Outen (22); Jason Manford (27)
5 (13)	29 September 2014	Jimmy Carr (19); Chris Packham (24); Kimberley Walsh (27)
6 (14)	6 October 2014	Chris Tarrant (21); Robert Webb (22); Kimberly Wyatt (37)
7 (15)	13 October 2014	

=== Series 3 (2015) ===
#	Original air date	Panelists
1 (16)	31 August 2015	Jerry Springer (19); Emma Bunton (17); Jason Byrne (15)
2 (17)	7 September 2015	Jonathan Ross (19); Alex Jones (15); Dara O Briain (12)
3 (18)	14 September 2015	Ricky Wilson (17); Jameela Jamil (16); Jimmy Carr (22)
4 (19)	21 September 2015	Sir Ranulph Fiennes (18); Sarah Millican (16); Russell Kane (14)
5 (20)	28 September 2015	Heston Blumenthal (18); Aisling Bea (15); Bob Mortimer (18)
6 (21)	5 October 2015	John Humphrys (19); Katherine Parkinson (15); Ed Byrne (11)
7 (22)	12 October 2015	Stephen Mangan (14); Sue Perkins (16); Romesh Ranganathan (17)
8 (23)	19 October 2015	

=== Series 4 (2016) ===
#	Original air date	Panelists
1 (24)	3 April 2016	Jessica Hynes (15); Davina McCall (17); Dara O Briain (16)
2 (25)	10 April 2016	Gregg Wallace (13); Sara Cox (12); Rhod Gilbert (16)
3 (26)	17 April 2016	Warwick Davis (14); Lorraine Kelly (16); Josh Widdicombe (16)
4 (27)	24 April 2016	Amir Khan (15); Katherine Ryan (20); Hugh Dennis (14)
5 (28)	1 May 2016	Len Goodman (15); Gabby Logan (21); Jimmy Carr (9)
6 (29)	8 May 2016	Alex Brooker (15); Claudia Winkleman (16); Bob Mortimer (9)
7 (30)	15 May 2016	Kate Humble (16); Richard Osman (15); Catherine Tate (14)
8 (31)	22 May 2016	

=== Series 5 (2016) ===
#	Original air date	Panelists
1 (32)	30 August 2016	Ross Kemp (18); Sara Cox (15); Bob Mortimer (15)
2 (33)	6 September 2016	Richard Madeley (17); Ruth Jones (18); Rhod Gilbert (12)
3 (34)	13 September 2016	Joe Lycett (16); Claudia Winkleman (15); Johnny Vegas (15)
4 (35)	20 September 2016	Danny Dyer (10); Meera Syal (14); Jason Byrne (15)
5 (36)	27 September 2016	Danny Baker (13); Roisin Conaty (15); Jack Dee (17)
6 (37)	4 October 2016	Philip Glenister (15); Jo Brand (17); Josh Widdicombe (15)
7 (38)	11 October 2016	Paul Hollywood (13); Gabby Logan (15); Hal Cruttenden (15)
8 (39)	18 October 2016	

=== Series 6 (2017) ===
#	Original air date	Panelists
1 (40)	31 August 2017	Martin Clunes (17); Aisling Bea (16); Jimmy Carr (15)
2 (41)	7 September 2017	Rob Brydon (17); Emma Bunton (16); Carol Vorderman (16)
3 (42)	14 September 2017	Noel Fielding (15); Roisin Conaty (14); Jason Manford (18)
4 (43)	21 September 2017	Harry Enfield (16); Alex Jones (15); Jason Byrne (16)
5 (44)	28 September 2017	Sir Trevor McDonald (13); Katherine Ryan (14); David Mitchell (15)
6 (45)	5 October 2017	Danny Baker (18); Alesha Dixon (15); Jon Richardson (16)
7 (46)	12 October 2017	Victoria Coren Mitchell (17); Rob Beckett (14); Melanie C (13)

== Reception ==
Writing for The Arts Desk, Matthew Wright said of the first episode "With QI's questions about Noam Chomsky substituted for lightweight popular psychology and an investigation into dog urine, there's not enough substance to bear the weight of the lengthy investigations."
