= Lee Mack =

English comedian and actor (born 1968)

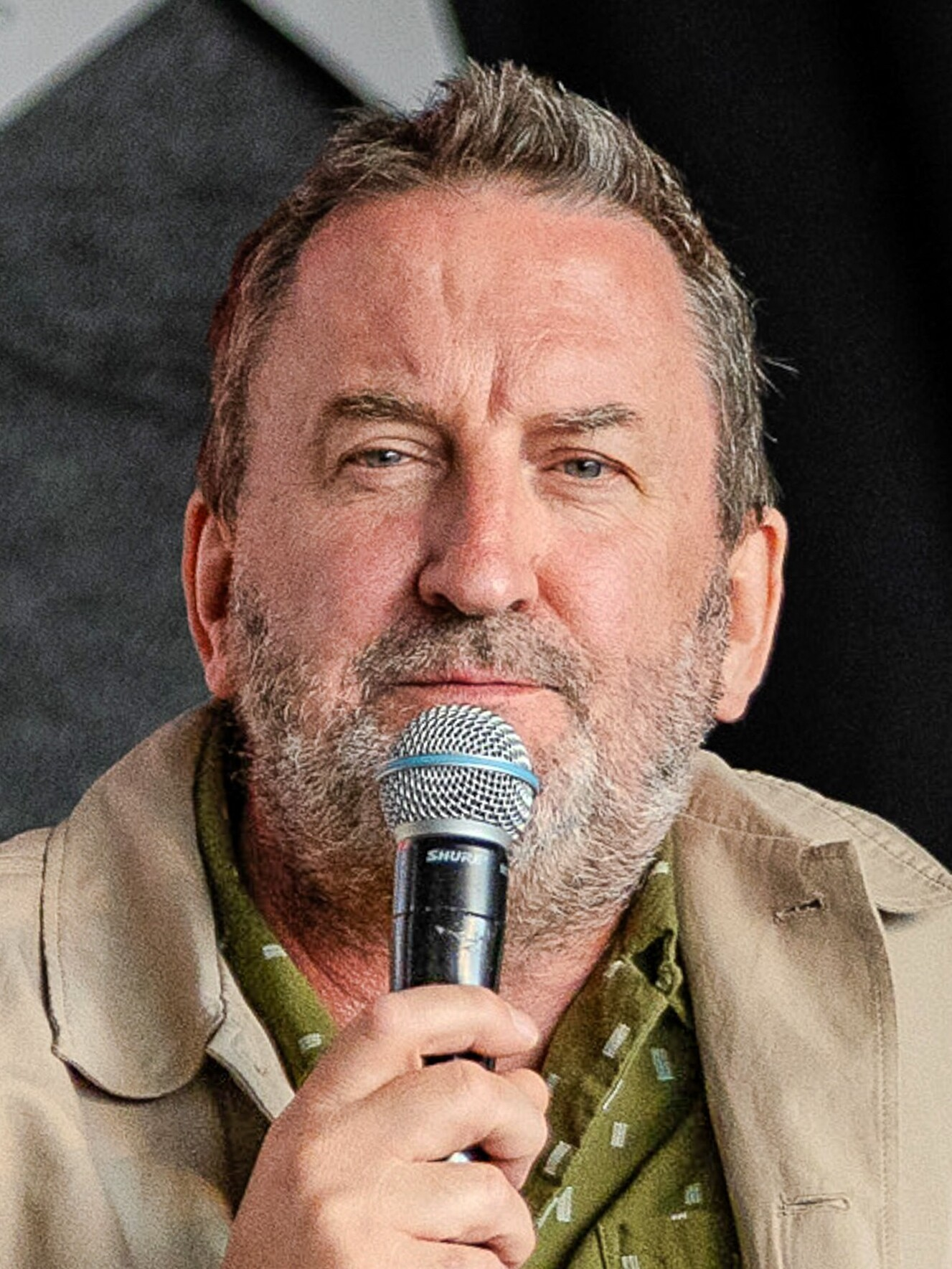
- Mack in 2025
- Born: Lee Gordon McKillop; 4 August 1968 (age 58); Southport, Lancashire, England
- Education: Brunel University of London (BA)
- Occupations: Comedian; actor; writer; podcaster; presenter
- Years active: 1994–present
- Known for: The Sketch Show (2001–2004); Not Going Out (2006–); Would I Lie to You? (2007–); Lee Mack's All Star Cast (2011); Duck Quacks Don't Echo (2014–2017); The 1% Club (2022–)
- Spouse: Tara Savage (m. 2005)
- Children: 3
- Lee Mack's voice from the BBC programme Desert Island Discs, 29 September 2013.
- Website: Official website

Lee Gordon McKillop (born 4 August 1968), known by his stage name Lee Mack, is an English comedian and actor. Mack created, co-writes and stars in the sitcom Not Going Out, and is a regular team captain on the panel show Would I Lie to You?. In 2022 he began hosting the game show The 1% Club.

== Early life ==
Lee Gordon McKillop was born on 4 August 1968 in Southport, Lancashire. He lived above a pub until he was 12, when his parents separated. He attended Birkdale Primary Junior School (Bury Road), Stanley High School in Southport, and Everton High School in Blackburn. On leaving school, Mack worked in a bingo hall and as a stable boy. After working at the stable of racehorse trainer Ginger McCain in Southport for three days, he asked if he could ride one of the horses, to which the trainer agreed. Without realising, Mack then chose Red Rum as the first horse he would ride.

Mack then became a Bluecoat entertainer at the Pontins holiday resort at Hemsby in Norfolk. He was sacked after appearing on stage drunk one night, forgetting a joke and insulting an audience member. He then worked for six months at Pontins in Morecambe.

Mack went on to have various other jobs, and performed his first "open mic" slot in 1994, while studying at Brunel University, from where he graduated with a degree in drama. Within 18 months he was a full-time comedian.

== Career ==
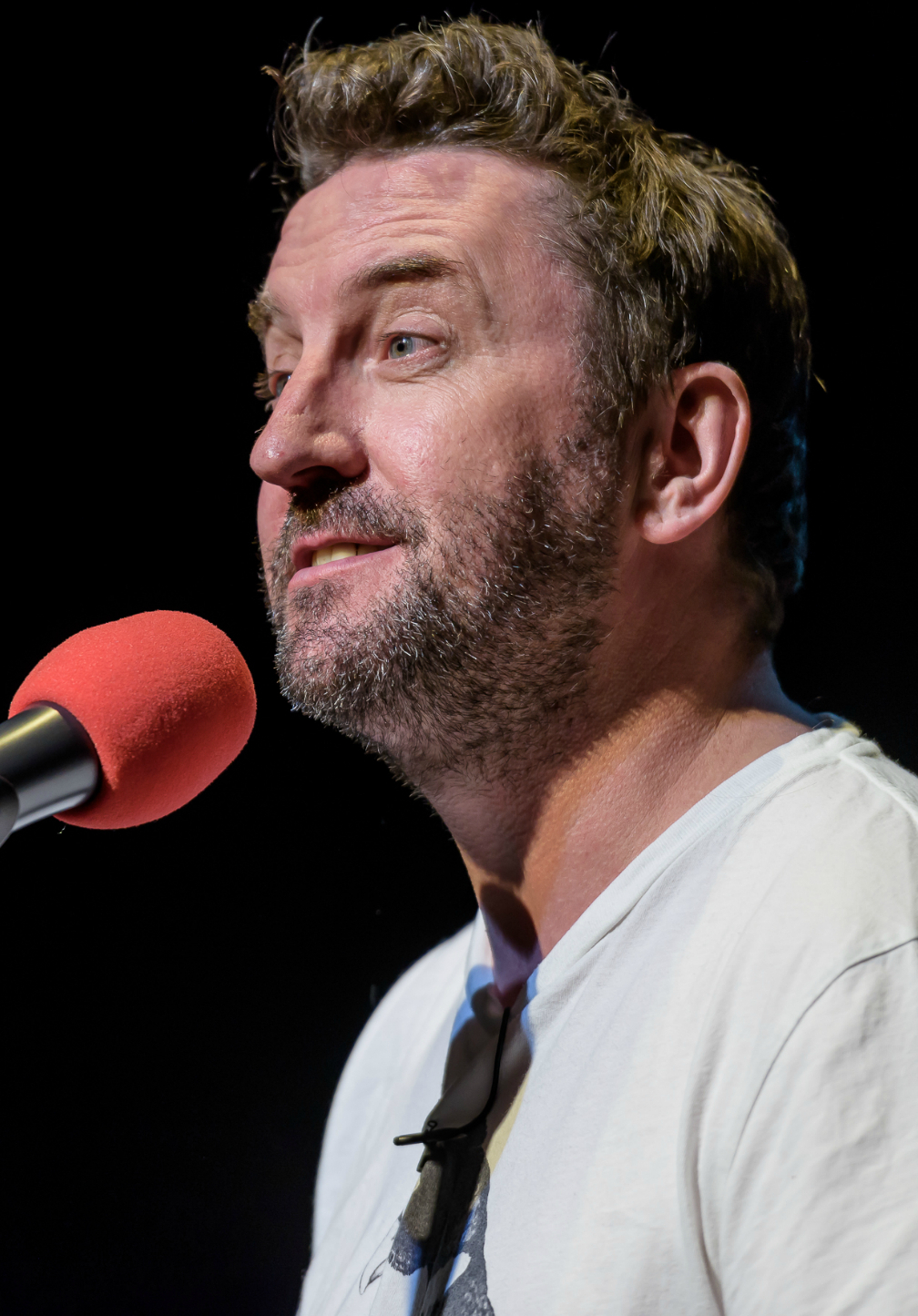
Lee Mack on Radio 4's Don't Make Me Laugh in 2015

Mack first came to prominence by winning So You Think You're Funny at the 1995 Edinburgh Festival Fringe. Five years later at the festival, he was nominated for the Perrier Award Main Prize for his sketch comedy show, Lee Mack's New Bits, with Catherine Tate and Dan Antopolski. Since then, Mack has played the part of Graham, the security guard in the original radio version of The Mighty Boosh, and also has his own radio show on BBC Radio 2 called The Lee Mack Show, which features varying celebrities co-hosting the show.

=== Television ===
Mack was a cast member for ITV's The Sketch Show in 2001 to 2004, and featured in the American show of the same name.

In 2005, Mack presented They Think It's All Over, a sports-based comedy panel game, formerly presented by Nick Hancock; it proved to be the show's final series. In 2007 he appeared on TV Heaven, Telly Hell.

His first sitcom, Not Going Out for BBC One with Tim Vine (in which he plays Lee, the leading man), premiered on 6 October 2006. The show has since returned for 15 seasons, the most recent airing in 2026. The show has won a Rose d'Or and RTS Award.

Since 2007 Mack has been a team captain on the BBC One comedy panel show Would I Lie to You? . Mack won multiple BAFTAs for his work on the show, including Best Male Comedy Performance BAFTA Award (television) winners. He has also been guest host on Have I Got News for You six times, and was twice guest host on Never Mind the Buzzcocks.

Mack has appeared on Live at the Apollo and 8 out of 10 Cats Does Countdown, where he is the current Carrot in a Box champion.

In June 2011, Mack launched a new show, Lee Mack's All Star Cast, for BBC One. It features members of the audience taking part in silly games to get a spot in a sketch at the end of the show. In June 2012, Mack was one of the compères at Queen Elizabeth II's Diamond Jubilee Concert outside Buckingham Palace in London, introducing Cliff Richard, Ed Sheeran, and Madness.

In March 2013, Mack appeared on the panel on an episode of Let's Dance for Comic Relief with Arlene Phillips and Greg James.

From 2014 to 2017, Mack presented Duck Quacks Don't Echo, a comedy-based panel show for Sky One, with various celebrity guests. In 2017, he made his stage debut in Molière's The Miser.

In 2018, Mack appeared in the Doctor Who episode "Kerblam!"

In June 2020, Mack announced his new sitcom, Semi-Detached. He was also set to host a reality show named The Chop: Britain's Best Woodworker for Sky History. However, the show was suspended shortly after its debut in October 2020, after allegations emerged that one of the series' contestants, promoted through the channel's social media pages, bore facial tattoos resembling Nazi symbolism. Semi-Detached was cancelled after one season.

Mack was on series 11 of Taskmaster, which started broadcast in March 2021.

Mack presented two new shows in 2022: Freeze the Fear with Wim Hof on BBC One - alongside Holly Willoughby and Wim Hof, and The 1% Club, on ITV. The 1% Club was renewed for a second and third series, plus two Christmas specials.

In June 2022, Mack was one of the compères at the Queen's Platinum Jubilee Platinum Party at the Palace, introducing Jax Jones and Diana Ross.

On 8 November 2022, it was announced that Mack would be hosting that year's Royal Variety Performance at the Royal Albert Hall.

On 18 May 2023, Mack appeared on an episode of the anthology series Inside No. 9. The episode was initially billed as "Hold on Tight!", featuring creators Steve Pemberton and Reece Shearsmith alongside Robin Askwith, and was going to be set within a No. 9 bus, but this turned out to be a deliberate hoax; the actual episode was "3 By 3", a supposed pilot quiz show hosted by Mack, that was introduced by the continuity announcer as a replacement for "Hold on Tight!". This was the second time Mack played himself presenting a fictitious game show after 2017's National Treasure.

=== Podcast ===
Mack has long had an interest in Buddhism, mindfulness and the possibility of leading a more spiritual life. Since September 2020, he has hosted a podcast on Buddhism and mindfulness with Neil Webster called I Can't Believe It's Not Buddha.

=== Stand-up ===
In April 2001, Mack appeared at Up The Creek (in Greenwich) and in 2003 he was regularly playing clubs around London — including Balham's Banana Cabaret, alongside Ian Cognito.

Mack went on tour in 2006 and filmed his first live DVD at the Bloomsbury Theatre, which was released the following year. In spring 2010, Mack embarked on his "Going Out" tour. Extra dates were added for autumn 2010 due to his spring tour being sold out well in advance. Going Out Live, his second live DVD, was filmed at the Hammersmith Apollo and was released in November. In December 2010 he performed at the Royal Variety Performance.

In 2010, Mack took part in Channel 4's Comedy Gala, a benefit show held in aid of Great Ormond Street Children's Hospital, filmed live at the O2 Arena in London on 30 March.

=== Other stage work ===
Mack briefly appeared as the Narrator in the stage adaptation of BBC Radio 4 comedy series, Bleak Expectations. He made his stage acting debut in March 2017 in a West End revival of The Miser by Molière at the Garrick Theatre, starring Griff Rhys-Jones.

== Personal life ==
Mack met his wife, Tara Savage, during his time studying at Brunel University in 1996. They married in 2005 and live in East Molesey, Surrey, with their three children, all of whom have appeared in Not Going Out: their eldest son briefly appeared in "House", the 2013 Christmas special, their younger son appeared in the fourteenth series episode "Dragon Castle", and their daughter appeared in the twelfth series episode "Friend". Mack is of distant part-Irish descent, which was explored in the 2018 series of the British television programme Who Do You Think You Are? While on the show, Mack found that his great-grandfather was a jobbing comic named William Alexander McKillop, who used the stage name Billy Mac. He also learned that his grandfather Joe was born in Southport, but was taken to Ireland as a baby and brought up by his grandparents in Ballina, County Mayo.

In February 2009, Mack, along with other British entertainers, signed an open letter to The Times regarding the Baháʼí Faith leaders then on trial in Iran.

Mack said in an interview with The Guardian that his first foray into comedy was doing Bobby Ball impressions at his school when he was 15. Ball later played Mack's father, Frank, in Not Going Out. Mack is a keen supporter of Blackburn Rovers and occasionally visits Ewood Park to watch games.

In July 2012, Mack received an honorary doctorate from Brunel University. He published his autobiography Mack the Life (ISBN 0-552-16655-3).

Mack is a darts fan and regularly plays with his friend and former Not Going Out co-star, Tim Vine. Both men appeared on the debut series of Let's Play Darts, facing each other in the final, with Mack and his partner Martin Adams beating Vine and his partner Darryl Fitton. Mack held two Guinness World Records titles relating to darts, which he achieved on the TV show Officially Amazing. The first was for the most darts number twos in one minute, which stood until 19 November 2020 when Ricky Evans broke the record with a total of 25. Mack had also, on the same day of the first record, broken the record for the most darts in inner and outer bullseyes in one minute; that title was held for a year and two months, before it was broken on 23 September 2016 by professional darts player James Wade.

In a 2015 interview with The Big Issue, Mack stated that he adheres to "left-of-centre" political leanings.

Mack is vegan. He has been alcohol-free since 2016, and is an ambassador for Alcohol Concern. He said in 2026 that he threatened to cancel Not Going Out because it carried alcohol advertising when repeated on Dave, and he turned down a role on Red Dwarf due to his dispute with the channel, which he regretted.

Mack has a phobia of flying, and travels by himself to holiday destinations. He travelled by train to Barcelona and went around the world for Children in Need in 2009 with other celebrities; however, he and Frank Skinner did not fly to Turkey. Mack said because the day he went home was his wife's birthday, he could not get the train back. He went on a flying course, which briefly helped for the flight home; however, he has not been on another plane since.

Mack has taken part in several Soccer Aid matches to raise money for UNICEF. In September 2021, he scored for the first time, in a year that he played for the World XI team, due to his Irish heritage from his great-grandmother. On 12 June 2022, Mack returned for the following game at the London Stadium, and scored the winning penalty for the World XI after a 2–2 draw in normal time.

== Stand-up shows ==
Year	Title	Notes
2010	Going Out	
2013–14	Hit the Road Mack	

=== DVD releases ===
Title	Released	Notes
Live	26 November 2007	Live at London's Bloomsbury Theatre
Going Out Live	22 November 2010	Live at London's Hammersmith Apollo
Hit The Road Mack	24 November 2014	Live at London's Hammersmith Apollo

== Filmography ==
=== Television ===
Year	Show	Role	Notes
1997–1998	Gas	Himself	
1999, 2005–2006	They Think It's All Over	Panellist and later Host	1 episode as panellist; host of Series 19 and 2006 specials
2001–2004	The Sketch Show	Lee	
2005–2008	8 Out of 10 Cats	Panellist	7 episodes
2005–2010	Live at the Apollo	Himself	3 episodes (1 as guest; 2 as host)
2006–present	Not Going Out	Lee	
2007–present	Would I Lie to You?	Regular team captain	
2008	Thank God You're Here	Himself	2 episodes
2008–2018	Have I Got News for You	Guest presenter	6 episodes
2009–2021	QI	Panellist	8 episodes
2010	Lee Mack: Going Out Live	Himself	Recorded at the Hammersmith Apollo and aired as a TV Special.
2010, 2012	Never Mind the Buzzcocks	Guest presenter	2 episodes
2011	Lee Mack's All Star Cast	Host	
2013, 2015–2018	8 Out of 10 Cats Does Countdown	Guest team captain	10 episodes
2014	The Smiths	Michael Smith	Pilot
2014	The Feeling Nuts Comedy Night	Himself	
2014–2017	Duck Quacks Don't Echo	Host	
2015	Let's Play Darts	Competitor	Won the show
2015	Officially Amazing	Guest	
2016, 2022	Ant & Dec's Saturday Night Takeaway	Guest announcer	
2016	Outnumbered	Thompson	uncredited; Christmas special
2018	Top Gear	Guest	1 episode
2018	Doctor Who	Dan Cooper	1 episode; "Kerblam!"
2019	Semi-Detached	Stuart	7 episodes
2019	Comedians Watching Football With Friends	Himself	1 episode
2021	Taskmaster	Contestant	10 episodes
2021–2022	Murder, They Hope	Willy Watkins	4 episodes
2022	Freeze the Fear with Wim Hof	Co-host	
2022	The Royal Variety Performance	Host	
2022–present	The 1% Club	Host	
2023	Inside No. 9	Himself	1 episode; "3 by 3"
2023	Brassic	Eddie Braithwaite	1 episode

=== Film ===
Year	Title	Role	Notes
2019	Horrible Histories: The Movie – Rotten Romans	Decimus	
2024	Bad Tidings	Neil	

=== Stage ===
Production	Dates	Role	Theatre
The Unfriend	9 January - 9 March 2024	Peter	Wyndham's Theatre, London

== Awards and nominations ==
BAFTA TV Awards

Year	Nominee / work	Award	Result
2002	The Sketch Show	Best Comedy Programme or Series	Won
2019	Himself for Would I Lie to You?	Best Entertainment Performance	Won
2020	Himself for Would I Lie to You?	Best Entertainment Performance	Nominated
2023	Himself for The 1% Club	Best Entertainment Performance	Nominated
2026	Himself for The 1% Club	Best Entertainment Performance	Nominated

British Comedy Awards

Year	Nominee / work	Award	Result
2001	Himself for The Sketch Show	Best Comedy Newcomer	Nominated
2006	Himself	Best Live Stand Up Tour	Nominated
2007	Himself for Not Going Out	Best TV Comedy Actor	Nominated
2007	Not Going Out	Best New TV Comedy	Nominated
2012	Himself	Best Male Television Comic	Won
2012	Himself	King or Queen of Comedy	Nominated
2013	Himself	Best Male Television Comic	Won
2013	Himself	King or Queen of Comedy	Nominated
2014	Himself	Best Male Television Comic	Won
2014	Himself	King or Queen of Comedy	Nominated
2014	Himself for Would I Lie to You?	Best Comedy Moment	Nominated
2022	Himself for Not Going Out	Outstanding Comedy Actor	Nominated
2023	Himself for Would I Lie to You?	Outstanding Male Comedy Entertainment Performance	Won

Rose d'Or Awards

Year	Nominee / work	Award	Result
2007	Not Going Out	Sitcom	Won

RTS Programme Awards

Year	Nominee / work	Award	Result
2007	Himself (and Andrew Collins) for Not Going Out	Breakthrough Award – Behind The Screen	Won
