= The 1% Club (Australian game show) =

Australian game show

- Genre: Game show
- Created by: Dean Nabarro; Andy Auerbach
- Presented by: Jim Jefferies
- Theme music composer: Twin Petes
- Country of origin: Australia
- Original language: English
- No. of series: 4
- No. of episodes: 30

Production
- Executive producer: John Leahy
- Production locations: Melbourne, Australia (S1, S4); Sydney, Australia (S2, S3)
- Running time: ca. 45 minutes
- Production company: BBC Studios Australia and New Zealand

Original release
- Network: Seven Network
- Release: 26 April 2023 – present

The 1% Club is an Australian television quiz show based on the British program of the same name. It is broadcast on the Seven Network and hosted by Jim Jefferies. The show is styled as an IQ test and the questions are not based on general knowledge, like many shows, but on "logic and common sense". The top prize achievable is $100,000.

== Production ==
Tom Gleeson revealed in May 2024 he was approached to host the show, but turned it down. Casting for a fourth season which began filming in Melbourne in February–March 2025, was announced in October 2024. Season 4 began airing on 19 April 2026. The series was renewed for a third season in November 2024, which was filmed in Sydney during August 2024.

== Gameplay ==
Before the show, members of the public are asked the same list of questions, including ones featured in the show. Based on the answers, it displays statistically what percentage of Australia's population should get each question correct. In the studio, 100 contestants all face a series of questions beginning with easy ones (e.g. 90% of the country can answer) to difficult ones (e.g. what 5% of the country can answer).

At the start of the show, each contestant receives a $1,000 stake, and if they get any question incorrect, they are eliminated from the game and the $1,000 stake is transferred into the prize pot. At the 50% question, whoever is left in the game from that point on has the option to pass on one question. When passing a question, their $1,000 stake enters the prize pot and they must continue into the game. At the 30% question, anyone still in the game who has not played their pass has the option to take their $1,000 stake and leave the game, or continue on. If no-one makes it past the 5% question, the strongest player(s) still play for the prize pot.

Whoever gets furthest into the quiz (the 1% question) can take a share of $10,000 to leave the game or decide to play on to the final question, where what remains in the prize pot is played for. If there are multiple players in the final round, they play for an equal share of the prize pot. If a player has not played their pass, they win $1,000 regardless of if they answer the 1% question incorrectly. An incorrect answer to the 1% question means that the player leaves with nothing.

== Episodes ==
Season	Episodes	Originally released	
Season	Episodes	First released	Last released
1	10	26 April 2023	19 November 2023
2	10	22 October 2023	7 April 2024
3	8	28 January 2025	4 June 2025
4	TBA	19 April 2026	TBA

The 1% Club Australia airs at 7:30 p.m. on Wednesdays, however it was moved to Mondays following Blow Up moved to 7flix.

=== Season 1 (2023) ===
No. overall	No. in season	Title	Original release date	Total Overnight TV Audience
1	1	"Episode 1"	26 April 2023	859,000
Episode 1 Results: 90% Question: Number of people who got it right: TBA; Number of people who are out: TBA; Number of people who passed: TBA; Prize Pot: TBA; Number of people who left with $1,000: TBA; 80% question: Number of people who got it right: TBA; Number of people who are out: TBA; Number of people who passed: TBA; Prize Pot: TBA; Number of people who left with $1,000: TBA; 70% question: Number of people who got it right: TBA; Number of people who are out: TBA; Number of people who passed: TBA; Prize Pot: TBA; Number of people who left with $1,000: TBA; 60% question: Number of people who got it right: TBA; Number of people who are out: TBA; Number of people who passed: TBA; Prize Pot: TBA; Number of people who left with $1,000: TBA; 50% question: Number of people who got it right: TBA; Number of people who are out: TBA; Number of people who passed: TBA; Prize Pot: TBA; Number of people who left with $1,000: TBA; 45% question: Number of people who got it right: TBA; Number of people who are out: TBA; Number of people who passed: TBA; Prize Pot: TBA; Number of people who left with $1,000: TBA; 40% question: Number of people who got it right: TBA; Number of people who are out: TBA; Number of people who passed: TBA; Prize Pot: TBA; Number of people who left with $1,000: TBA; 35% question: Number of people who got it right: TBA; Number of people who are out: TBA; Number of people who passed: TBA; Prize Pot: TBA; Number of people who left with $1,000: TBA; 30% question: Number of people who got it right: TBA; Number of people who are out: TBA; Number of people who passed: TBA; Prize Pot: TBA; Number of people who left with $1,000: TBA; 25% question: Number of people who got it right: TBA; Number of people who are out: TBA; Number of people who passed: TBA; Prize Pot: TBA; Number of people who left with $1,000: TBA; 20% question: Number of people who got it right: TBA; Number of people who are out: TBA; Number of people who passed: TBA; Prize Pot: TBA; Number of people who left with $1,000: TBA; 15% question: Number of people who got it right: TBA; Number of people who are out: TBA; Number of people who passed: TBA; Prize Pot: TBA; Number of people who left with $1,000: TBA; 10% question: Number of people who got it right: TBA; Number of people who are out: TBA; Number of people who passed: TBA; Prize Pot: TBA; Number of people who left with $1,000: TBA; 5% question: Number of people who got it right: TBA; Number of people who are out: TBA; Number of people who passed: TBA; Prize Pot: TBA; Number of people who left with $1,000: TBA; Names of the remaining contestants: TBA; 1% question: Contestant who won: TBA; Contestant who lost: TBA; Contestant who left: TBA
2	2	"Episode 2"	3 May 2023	760,000
Episode 2 Results: 90% Question: Number of people who got it right: TBA; Number of people who are out: TBA; Number of people who passed: TBA; Prize Pot: TBA; Number of people who left with $1,000: TBA; 80% question: Number of people who got it right: TBA; Number of people who are out: TBA; Number of people who passed: TBA; Prize Pot: TBA; Number of people who left with $1,000: TBA; 70% question: Number of people who got it right: TBA; Number of people who are out: TBA; Number of people who passed: TBA; Prize Pot: TBA; Number of people who left with $1,000: TBA; 60% question: Number of people who got it right: TBA; Number of people who are out: TBA; Number of people who passed: TBA; Prize Pot: TBA; Number of people who left with $1,000: TBA; 50% question: Number of people who got it right: TBA; Number of people who are out: TBA; Number of people who passed: TBA; Prize Pot: TBA; Number of people who left with $1,000: TBA; 45% question: Number of people who got it right: TBA; Number of people who are out: TBA; Number of people who passed: TBA; Prize Pot: TBA; Number of people who left with $1,000: TBA; 40% question: Number of people who got it right: TBA; Number of people who are out: TBA; Number of people who passed: TBA; Prize Pot: TBA; Number of people who left with $1,000: TBA; 35% question: Number of people who got it right: TBA; Number of people who are out: TBA; Number of people who passed: TBA; Prize Pot: TBA; Number of people who left with $1,000: TBA; 30% question: Number of people who got it right: TBA; Number of people who are out: TBA; Number of people who passed: TBA; Prize Pot: TBA; Number of people who left with $1,000: TBA; 25% question: Number of people who got it right: TBA; Number of people who are out: TBA; Number of people who passed: TBA; Prize Pot: TBA; Number of people who left with $1,000: TBA; 20% question: Number of people who got it right: TBA; Number of people who are out: TBA; Number of people who passed: TBA; Prize Pot: TBA; Number of people who left with $1,000: TBA; 15% question: Number of people who got it right: TBA; Number of people who are out: TBA; Number of people who passed: TBA; Prize Pot: TBA; Number of people who left with $1,000: TBA; 10% question: Number of people who got it right: TBA; Number of people who are out: TBA; Number of people who passed: TBA; Prize Pot: TBA; Number of people who left with $1,000: TBA; 5% question: Number of people who got it right: TBA; Number of people who are out: TBA; Number of people who passed: TBA; Prize Pot: TBA; Number of people who left with $1,000: TBA; Names of the remaining contestants: TBA; 1% question: Contestant who won: TBA; Contestant who lost: TBA; Contestant who left: TBA
3	3	"Episode 3"	10 May 2023	753,000
Episode 3 Results: 90% Question: Number of people who got it right: TBA; Number of people who are out: TBA; Number of people who passed: TBA; Prize Pot: TBA; Number of people who left with $1,000: TBA; 80% question: Number of people who got it right: TBA; Number of people who are out: TBA; Number of people who passed: TBA; Prize Pot: TBA; Number of people who left with $1,000: TBA; 70% question: Number of people who got it right: TBA; Number of people who are out: TBA; Number of people who passed: TBA; Prize Pot: TBA; Number of people who left with $1,000: TBA; 60% question: Number of people who got it right: TBA; Number of people who are out: TBA; Number of people who passed: TBA; Prize Pot: TBA; Number of people who left with $1,000: TBA; 50% question: Number of people who got it right: TBA; Number of people who are out: TBA; Number of people who passed: TBA; Prize Pot: TBA; Number of people who left with $1,000: TBA; 45% question: Number of people who got it right: TBA; Number of people who are out: TBA; Number of people who passed: TBA; Prize Pot: TBA; Number of people who left with $1,000: TBA; 40% question: Number of people who got it right: TBA; Number of people who are out: TBA; Number of people who passed: TBA; Prize Pot: TBA; Number of people who left with $1,000: TBA; 35% question: Number of people who got it right: TBA; Number of people who are out: TBA; Number of people who passed: TBA; Prize Pot: TBA; Number of people who left with $1,000: TBA; 30% question: Number of people who got it right: TBA; Number of people who are out: TBA; Number of people who passed: TBA; Prize Pot: TBA; Number of people who left with $1,000: TBA; 25% question: Number of people who got it right: TBA; Number of people who are out: TBA; Number of people who passed: TBA; Prize Pot: TBA; Number of people who left with $1,000: TBA; 20% question: Number of people who got it right: TBA; Number of people who are out: TBA; Number of people who passed: TBA; Prize Pot: TBA; Number of people who left with $1,000: TBA; 15% question: Number of people who got it right: TBA; Number of people who are out: TBA; Number of people who passed: TBA; Prize Pot: TBA; Number of people who left with $1,000: TBA; 10% question: Number of people who got it right: TBA; Number of people who are out: TBA; Number of people who passed: TBA; Prize Pot: TBA; Number of people who left with $1,000: TBA; 5% question: Number of people who got it right: TBA; Number of people who are out: TBA; Number of people who passed: TBA; Prize Pot: TBA; Number of people who left with $1,000: TBA; Names of the remaining contestants: TBA; 1% question: Contestant who won: TBA; Contestant who lost: TBA; Contestant who left: TBA
4	4	"Episode 4"	17 May 2023	757,000
Episode 4 Results: 90% Question: Number of people who got it right: TBA; Number of people who are out: TBA; Number of people who passed: TBA; Prize Pot: TBA; Number of people who left with $1,000: TBA; 80% question: Number of people who got it right: TBA; Number of people who are out: TBA; Number of people who passed: TBA; Prize Pot: TBA; Number of people who left with $1,000: TBA; 70% question: Number of people who got it right: TBA; Number of people who are out: TBA; Number of people who passed: TBA; Prize Pot: TBA; Number of people who left with $1,000: TBA; 60% question: Number of people who got it right: TBA; Number of people who are out: TBA; Number of people who passed: TBA; Prize Pot: TBA; Number of people who left with $1,000: TBA; 50% question: Number of people who got it right: TBA; Number of people who are out: TBA; Number of people who passed: TBA; Prize Pot: TBA; Number of people who left with $1,000: TBA; 45% question: Number of people who got it right: TBA; Number of people who are out: TBA; Number of people who passed: TBA; Prize Pot: TBA; Number of people who left with $1,000: TBA; 40% question: Number of people who got it right: TBA; Number of people who are out: TBA; Number of people who passed: TBA; Prize Pot: TBA; Number of people who left with $1,000: TBA; 35% question: Number of people who got it right: TBA; Number of people who are out: TBA; Number of people who passed: TBA; Prize Pot: TBA; Number of people who left with $1,000: TBA; 30% question: Number of people who got it right: TBA; Number of people who are out: TBA; Number of people who passed: TBA; Prize Pot: TBA; Number of people who left with $1,000: TBA; 25% question: Number of people who got it right: TBA; Number of people who are out: TBA; Number of people who passed: TBA; Prize Pot: TBA; Number of people who left with $1,000: TBA; 20% question: Number of people who got it right: TBA; Number of people who are out: TBA; Number of people who passed: TBA; Prize Pot: TBA; Number of people who left with $1,000: TBA; 15% question: Number of people who got it right: TBA; Number of people who are out: TBA; Number of people who passed: TBA; Prize Pot: TBA; Number of people who left with $1,000: TBA; 10% question: Number of people who got it right: TBA; Number of people who are out: TBA; Number of people who passed: TBA; Prize Pot: TBA; Number of people who left with $1,000: TBA; 5% question: Number of people who got it right: TBA; Number of people who are out: TBA; Number of people who passed: TBA; Prize Pot: TBA; Number of people who left with $1,000: TBA; Names of the remaining contestants: TBA; 1% question: Contestant who won: TBA; Contestant who lost: TBA; Contestant who left: TBA
5	5	"Episode 5"	24 May 2023	817,000
Episode 5 Results: 90% Question: Number of people who got it right: TBA; Number of people who are out: TBA; Number of people who passed: TBA; Prize Pot: TBA; Number of people who left with $1,000: TBA; 80% question: Number of people who got it right: TBA; Number of people who are out: TBA; Number of people who passed: TBA; Prize Pot: TBA; Number of people who left with $1,000: TBA; 70% question: Number of people who got it right: TBA; Number of people who are out: TBA; Number of people who passed: TBA; Prize Pot: TBA; Number of people who left with $1,000: TBA; 60% question: Number of people who got it right: TBA; Number of people who are out: TBA; Number of people who passed: TBA; Prize Pot: TBA; Number of people who left with $1,000: TBA; 50% question: Number of people who got it right: TBA; Number of people who are out: TBA; Number of people who passed: TBA; Prize Pot: TBA; Number of people who left with $1,000: TBA; 45% question: Number of people who got it right: TBA; Number of people who are out: TBA; Number of people who passed: TBA; Prize Pot: TBA; Number of people who left with $1,000: TBA; 40% question: Number of people who got it right: TBA; Number of people who are out: TBA; Number of people who passed: TBA; Prize Pot: TBA; Number of people who left with $1,000: TBA; 35% question: Number of people who got it right: TBA; Number of people who are out: TBA; Number of people who passed: TBA; Prize Pot: TBA; Number of people who left with $1,000: TBA; 30% question: Number of people who got it right: TBA; Number of people who are out: TBA; Number of people who passed: TBA; Prize Pot: TBA; Number of people who left with $1,000: TBA; 25% question: Number of people who got it right: TBA; Number of people who are out: TBA; Number of people who passed: TBA; Prize Pot: TBA; Number of people who left with $1,000: TBA; 20% question: Number of people who got it right: TBA; Number of people who are out: TBA; Number of people who passed: TBA; Prize Pot: TBA; Number of people who left with $1,000: TBA; 15% question: Number of people who got it right: TBA; Number of people who are out: TBA; Number of people who passed: TBA; Prize Pot: TBA; Number of people who left with $1,000: TBA; 10% question: Number of people who got it right: TBA; Number of people who are out: TBA; Number of people who passed: TBA; Prize Pot: TBA; Number of people who left with $1,000: TBA; 5% question: Number of people who got it right: TBA; Number of people who are out: TBA; Number of people who passed: TBA; Prize Pot: TBA; Number of people who left with $1,000: TBA; Names of the remaining contestants: TBA; 1% question: Contestant who won: TBA; Contestant who lost: TBA; Contestant who left: TBA
6	6	"Episode 6"	29 May 2023	902,000
Episode 6 Results: 90% Question: Number of people who got it right: TBA; Number of people who are out: TBA; Number of people who passed: TBA; Prize Pot: TBA; Number of people who left with $1,000: TBA; 80% question: Number of people who got it right: TBA; Number of people who are out: TBA; Number of people who passed: TBA; Prize Pot: TBA; Number of people who left with $1,000: TBA; 70% question: Number of people who got it right: TBA; Number of people who are out: TBA; Number of people who passed: TBA; Prize Pot: TBA; Number of people who left with $1,000: TBA; 60% question: Number of people who got it right: TBA; Number of people who are out: TBA; Number of people who passed: TBA; Prize Pot: TBA; Number of people who left with $1,000: TBA; 50% question: Number of people who got it right: TBA; Number of people who are out: TBA; Number of people who passed: TBA; Prize Pot: TBA; Number of people who left with $1,000: TBA; 45% question: Number of people who got it right: TBA; Number of people who are out: TBA; Number of people who passed: TBA; Prize Pot: TBA; Number of people who left with $1,000: TBA; 40% question: Number of people who got it right: TBA; Number of people who are out: TBA; Number of people who passed: TBA; Prize Pot: TBA; Number of people who left with $1,000: TBA; 35% question: Number of people who got it right: TBA; Number of people who are out: TBA; Number of people who passed: TBA; Prize Pot: TBA; Number of people who left with $1,000: TBA; 30% question: Number of people who got it right: TBA; Number of people who are out: TBA; Number of people who passed: TBA; Prize Pot: TBA; Number of people who left with $1,000: TBA; 25% question: Number of people who got it right: TBA; Number of people who are out: TBA; Number of people who passed: TBA; Prize Pot: TBA; Number of people who left with $1,000: TBA; 20% question: Number of people who got it right: TBA; Number of people who are out: TBA; Number of people who passed: TBA; Prize Pot: TBA; Number of people who left with $1,000: TBA; 15% question: Number of people who got it right: TBA; Number of people who are out: TBA; Number of people who passed: TBA; Prize Pot: TBA; Number of people who left with $1,000: TBA; 10% question: Number of people who got it right: TBA; Number of people who are out: TBA; Number of people who passed: TBA; Prize Pot: TBA; Number of people who left with $1,000: TBA; 5% question: Number of people who got it right: TBA; Number of people who are out: TBA; Number of people who passed: TBA; Prize Pot: TBA; Number of people who left with $1,000: TBA; Names of the remaining contestants: TBA; 1% question: Contestant who won: TBA; Contestant who lost: TBA; Contestant who left: TBA
7	7	"Episode 7"	5 June 2023	877,000
Episode 7 Results: 90% Question: Number of people who got it right: TBA; Number of people who are out: TBA; Number of people who passed: TBA; Prize Pot: TBA; Number of people who left with $1,000: TBA; 80% question: Number of people who got it right: TBA; Number of people who are out: TBA; Number of people who passed: TBA; Prize Pot: TBA; Number of people who left with $1,000: TBA; 70% question: Number of people who got it right: TBA; Number of people who are out: TBA; Number of people who passed: TBA; Prize Pot: TBA; Number of people who left with $1,000: TBA; 60% question: Number of people who got it right: TBA; Number of people who are out: TBA; Number of people who passed: TBA; Prize Pot: TBA; Number of people who left with $1,000: TBA; 50% question: Number of people who got it right: TBA; Number of people who are out: TBA; Number of people who passed: TBA; Prize Pot: TBA; Number of people who left with $1,000: TBA; 45% question: Number of people who got it right: TBA; Number of people who are out: TBA; Number of people who passed: TBA; Prize Pot: TBA; Number of people who left with $1,000: TBA; 40% question: Number of people who got it right: TBA; Number of people who are out: TBA; Number of people who passed: TBA; Prize Pot: TBA; Number of people who left with $1,000: TBA; 35% question: Number of people who got it right: TBA; Number of people who are out: TBA; Number of people who passed: TBA; Prize Pot: TBA; Number of people who left with $1,000: TBA; 30% question: Number of people who got it right: TBA; Number of people who are out: TBA; Number of people who passed: TBA; Prize Pot: TBA; Number of people who left with $1,000: TBA; 25% question: Number of people who got it right: TBA; Number of people who are out: TBA; Number of people who passed: TBA; Prize Pot: TBA; Number of people who left with $1,000: TBA; 20% question: Number of people who got it right: TBA; Number of people who are out: TBA; Number of people who passed: TBA; Prize Pot: TBA; Number of people who left with $1,000: TBA; 15% question: Number of people who got it right: TBA; Number of people who are out: TBA; Number of people who passed: TBA; Prize Pot: TBA; Number of people who left with $1,000: TBA; 10% question: Number of people who got it right: TBA; Number of people who are out: TBA; Number of people who passed: TBA; Prize Pot: TBA; Number of people who left with $1,000: TBA; 5% question: Number of people who got it right: TBA; Number of people who are out: TBA; Number of people who passed: TBA; Prize Pot: TBA; Number of people who left with $1,000: TBA; Names of the remaining contestants: TBA; 1% question: Contestant who won: TBA; Contestant who lost: TBA; Contestant who left: TBA
8	8	"Episode 8"	5 November 2023	813,000
Episode 8 Results: 90% Question: Number of people who got it right: TBA; Number of people who are out: TBA; Number of people who passed: TBA; Prize Pot: TBA; Number of people who left with $1,000: TBA; 80% question: Number of people who got it right: TBA; Number of people who are out: TBA; Number of people who passed: TBA; Prize Pot: TBA; Number of people who left with $1,000: TBA; 70% question: Number of people who got it right: TBA; Number of people who are out: TBA; Number of people who passed: TBA; Prize Pot: TBA; Number of people who left with $1,000: TBA; 60% question: Number of people who got it right: TBA; Number of people who are out: TBA; Number of people who passed: TBA; Prize Pot: TBA; Number of people who left with $1,000: TBA; 50% question: Number of people who got it right: TBA; Number of people who are out: TBA; Number of people who passed: TBA; Prize Pot: TBA; Number of people who left with $1,000: TBA; 45% question: Number of people who got it right: TBA; Number of people who are out: TBA; Number of people who passed: TBA; Prize Pot: TBA; Number of people who left with $1,000: TBA; 40% question: Number of people who got it right: TBA; Number of people who are out: TBA; Number of people who passed: TBA; Prize Pot: TBA; Number of people who left with $1,000: TBA; 35% question: Number of people who got it right: TBA; Number of people who are out: TBA; Number of people who passed: TBA; Prize Pot: TBA; Number of people who left with $1,000: TBA; 30% question: Number of people who got it right: TBA; Number of people who are out: TBA; Number of people who passed: TBA; Prize Pot: TBA; Number of people who left with $1,000: TBA; 25% question: Number of people who got it right: TBA; Number of people who are out: TBA; Number of people who passed: TBA; Prize Pot: TBA; Number of people who left with $1,000: TBA; 20% question: Number of people who got it right: TBA; Number of people who are out: TBA; Number of people who passed: TBA; Prize Pot: TBA; Number of people who left with $1,000: TBA; 15% question: Number of people who got it right: TBA; Number of people who are out: TBA; Number of people who passed: TBA; Prize Pot: TBA; Number of people who left with $1,000: TBA; 10% question: Number of people who got it right: TBA; Number of people who are out: TBA; Number of people who passed: TBA; Prize Pot: TBA; Number of people who left with $1,000: TBA; 5% question: Number of people who got it right: TBA; Number of people who are out: TBA; Number of people who passed: TBA; Prize Pot: TBA; Number of people who left with $1,000: TBA; Names of the remaining contestants: TBA; 1% question: Contestant who won: TBA; Contestant who lost: TBA; Contestant who left: TBA
9	9	"Episode 9"	19 November 2023	937,000
Episode 9 Results: 90% Question: Number of people who got it right: TBA; Number of people who are out: TBA; Number of people who passed: TBA; Prize Pot: TBA; Number of people who left with $1,000: TBA; 80% question: Number of people who got it right: TBA; Number of people who are out: TBA; Number of people who passed: TBA; Prize Pot: TBA; Number of people who left with $1,000: TBA; 70% question: Number of people who got it right: TBA; Number of people who are out: TBA; Number of people who passed: TBA; Prize Pot: TBA; Number of people who left with $1,000: TBA; 60% question: Number of people who got it right: TBA; Number of people who are out: TBA; Number of people who passed: TBA; Prize Pot: TBA; Number of people who left with $1,000: TBA; 50% question: Number of people who got it right: TBA; Number of people who are out: TBA; Number of people who passed: TBA; Prize Pot: TBA; Number of people who left with $1,000: TBA; 45% question: Number of people who got it right: TBA; Number of people who are out: TBA; Number of people who passed: TBA; Prize Pot: TBA; Number of people who left with $1,000: TBA; 40% question: Number of people who got it right: TBA; Number of people who are out: TBA; Number of people who passed: TBA; Prize Pot: TBA; Number of people who left with $1,000: TBA; 35% question: Number of people who got it right: TBA; Number of people who are out: TBA; Number of people who passed: TBA; Prize Pot: TBA; Number of people who left with $1,000: TBA; 30% question: Number of people who got it right: TBA; Number of people who are out: TBA; Number of people who passed: TBA; Prize Pot: TBA; Number of people who left with $1,000: TBA; 25% question: Number of people who got it right: TBA; Number of people who are out: TBA; Number of people who passed: TBA; Prize Pot: TBA; Number of people who left with $1,000: TBA; 20% question: Number of people who got it right: TBA; Number of people who are out: TBA; Number of people who passed: TBA; Prize Pot: TBA; Number of people who left with $1,000: TBA; 15% question: Number of people who got it right: TBA; Number of people who are out: TBA; Number of people who passed: TBA; Prize Pot: TBA; Number of people who left with $1,000: TBA; 10% question: Number of people who got it right: TBA; Number of people who are out: TBA; Number of people who passed: TBA; Prize Pot: TBA; Number of people who left with $1,000: TBA; 5% question: Number of people who got it right: TBA; Number of people who are out: TBA; Number of people who passed: TBA; Prize Pot: TBA; Number of people who left with $1,000: TBA; Names of the remaining contestants: TBA; 1% question: Contestant who won: TBA; Contestant who lost: TBA; Contestant who left: TBA
10	10	"Episode 10"	12 November 2023	999,000
Episode 10 Results: 90% Question: Number of people who got it right: TBA; Number of people who are out: TBA; Number of people who passed: TBA; Prize Pot: TBA; Number of people who left with $1,000: TBA; 80% question: Number of people who got it right: TBA; Number of people who are out: TBA; Number of people who passed: TBA; Prize Pot: TBA; Number of people who left with $1,000: TBA; 70% question: Number of people who got it right: TBA; Number of people who are out: TBA; Number of people who passed: TBA; Prize Pot: TBA; Number of people who left with $1,000: TBA; 60% question: Number of people who got it right: TBA; Number of people who are out: TBA; Number of people who passed: TBA; Prize Pot: TBA; Number of people who left with $1,000: TBA; 50% question: Number of people who got it right: TBA; Number of people who are out: TBA; Number of people who passed: TBA; Prize Pot: TBA; Number of people who left with $1,000: TBA; 45% question: Number of people who got it right: TBA; Number of people who are out: TBA; Number of people who passed: TBA; Prize Pot: TBA; Number of people who left with $1,000: TBA; 40% question: Number of people who got it right: TBA; Number of people who are out: TBA; Number of people who passed: TBA; Prize Pot: TBA; Number of people who left with $1,000: TBA; 35% question: Number of people who got it right: TBA; Number of people who are out: TBA; Number of people who passed: TBA; Prize Pot: TBA; Number of people who left with $1,000: TBA; 30% question: Number of people who got it right: TBA; Number of people who are out: TBA; Number of people who passed: TBA; Prize Pot: TBA; Number of people who left with $1,000: TBA; 25% question: Number of people who got it right: TBA; Number of people who are out: TBA; Number of people who passed: TBA; Prize Pot: TBA; Number of people who left with $1,000: TBA; 20% question: Number of people who got it right: TBA; Number of people who are out: TBA; Number of people who passed: TBA; Prize Pot: TBA; Number of people who left with $1,000: TBA; 15% question: Number of people who got it right: TBA; Number of people who are out: TBA; Number of people who passed: TBA; Prize Pot: TBA; Number of people who left with $1,000: TBA; 10% question: Number of people who got it right: TBA; Number of people who are out: TBA; Number of people who passed: TBA; Prize Pot: TBA; Number of people who left with $1,000: TBA; 5% question: Number of people who got it right: TBA; Number of people who are out: TBA; Number of people who passed: TBA; Prize Pot: TBA; Number of people who left with $1,000: TBA; Names of the remaining contestants: TBA; 1% question: Contestant who won: TBA; Contestant who lost: TBA; Contestant who left: TBA

=== Season 2 (2023–24) ===
No. overall	No. in season	Title	Original release date	Total TV Audience
11	1	"Episode 1"	22 October 2023	817,000
Episode 1 Results: 90% Question: Number of people who got it right: TBA; Number of people who are out: TBA; Number of people who passed: TBA; Prize Pot: TBA; Number of people who left with $1,000: TBA; 80% question: Number of people who got it right: TBA; Number of people who are out: TBA; Number of people who passed: TBA; Prize Pot: TBA; Number of people who left with $1,000: TBA; 70% question: Number of people who got it right: TBA; Number of people who are out: TBA; Number of people who passed: TBA; Prize Pot: TBA; Number of people who left with $1,000: TBA; 60% question: Number of people who got it right: TBA; Number of people who are out: TBA; Number of people who passed: TBA; Prize Pot: TBA; Number of people who left with $1,000: TBA; 50% question: Number of people who got it right: TBA; Number of people who are out: TBA; Number of people who passed: TBA; Prize Pot: TBA; Number of people who left with $1,000: TBA; 45% question: Number of people who got it right: TBA; Number of people who are out: TBA; Number of people who passed: TBA; Prize Pot: TBA; Number of people who left with $1,000: TBA; 40% question: Number of people who got it right: TBA; Number of people who are out: TBA; Number of people who passed: TBA; Prize Pot: TBA; Number of people who left with $1,000: TBA; 35% question: Number of people who got it right: TBA; Number of people who are out: TBA; Number of people who passed: TBA; Prize Pot: TBA; Number of people who left with $1,000: TBA; 30% question: Number of people who got it right: TBA; Number of people who are out: TBA; Number of people who passed: TBA; Prize Pot: TBA; Number of people who left with $1,000: TBA; 25% question: Number of people who got it right: TBA; Number of people who are out: TBA; Number of people who passed: TBA; Prize Pot: TBA; Number of people who left with $1,000: TBA; 20% question: Number of people who got it right: TBA; Number of people who are out: TBA; Number of people who passed: TBA; Prize Pot: TBA; Number of people who left with $1,000: TBA; 15% question: Number of people who got it right: TBA; Number of people who are out: TBA; Number of people who passed: TBA; Prize Pot: TBA; Number of people who left with $1,000: TBA; 10% question: Number of people who got it right: TBA; Number of people who are out: TBA; Number of people who passed: TBA; Prize Pot: TBA; Number of people who left with $1,000: TBA; 5% question: Number of people who got it right: TBA; Number of people who are out: TBA; Number of people who passed: TBA; Prize Pot: TBA; Number of people who left with $1,000: TBA; Names of the remaining contestants: TBA; 1% question: Contestant who won: TBA; Contestant who lost: TBA; Contestant who left: TBA
12	2	"Episode 2"	29 October 2023	791,000
Episode 2 Results: 90% Question: Number of people who got it right: TBA; Number of people who are out: TBA; Number of people who passed: TBA; Prize Pot: TBA; Number of people who left with $1,000: TBA; 80% question: Number of people who got it right: TBA; Number of people who are out: TBA; Number of people who passed: TBA; Prize Pot: TBA; Number of people who left with $1,000: TBA; 70% question: Number of people who got it right: TBA; Number of people who are out: TBA; Number of people who passed: TBA; Prize Pot: TBA; Number of people who left with $1,000: TBA; 60% question: Number of people who got it right: TBA; Number of people who are out: TBA; Number of people who passed: TBA; Prize Pot: TBA; Number of people who left with $1,000: TBA; 50% question: Number of people who got it right: TBA; Number of people who are out: TBA; Number of people who passed: TBA; Prize Pot: TBA; Number of people who left with $1,000: TBA; 45% question: Number of people who got it right: TBA; Number of people who are out: TBA; Number of people who passed: TBA; Prize Pot: TBA; Number of people who left with $1,000: TBA; 40% question: Number of people who got it right: TBA; Number of people who are out: TBA; Number of people who passed: TBA; Prize Pot: TBA; Number of people who left with $1,000: TBA; 35% question: Number of people who got it right: TBA; Number of people who are out: TBA; Number of people who passed: TBA; Prize Pot: TBA; Number of people who left with $1,000: TBA; 30% question: Number of people who got it right: TBA; Number of people who are out: TBA; Number of people who passed: TBA; Prize Pot: TBA; Number of people who left with $1,000: TBA; 25% question: Number of people who got it right: TBA; Number of people who are out: TBA; Number of people who passed: TBA; Prize Pot: TBA; Number of people who left with $1,000: TBA; 20% question: Number of people who got it right: TBA; Number of people who are out: TBA; Number of people who passed: TBA; Prize Pot: TBA; Number of people who left with $1,000: TBA; 15% question: Number of people who got it right: TBA; Number of people who are out: TBA; Number of people who passed: TBA; Prize Pot: TBA; Number of people who left with $1,000: TBA; 10% question: Number of people who got it right: TBA; Number of people who are out: TBA; Number of people who passed: TBA; Prize Pot: TBA; Number of people who left with $1,000: TBA; 5% question: Number of people who got it right: TBA; Number of people who are out: TBA; Number of people who passed: TBA; Prize Pot: TBA; Number of people who left with $1,000: TBA; Names of the remaining contestants: TBA; 1% question: Contestant who won: TBA; Contestant who lost: TBA; Contestant who left: TBA
13	3	"Episode 3"	27 November 2023	874,000
Episode 3 Results: 90% Question: Number of people who got it right: TBA; Number of people who are out: TBA; Number of people who passed: TBA; Prize Pot: TBA; Number of people who left with $1,000: TBA; 80% question: Number of people who got it right: TBA; Number of people who are out: TBA; Number of people who passed: TBA; Prize Pot: TBA; Number of people who left with $1,000: TBA; 70% question: Number of people who got it right: TBA; Number of people who are out: TBA; Number of people who passed: TBA; Prize Pot: TBA; Number of people who left with $1,000: TBA; 60% question: Number of people who got it right: TBA; Number of people who are out: TBA; Number of people who passed: TBA; Prize Pot: TBA; Number of people who left with $1,000: TBA; 50% question: Number of people who got it right: TBA; Number of people who are out: TBA; Number of people who passed: TBA; Prize Pot: TBA; Number of people who left with $1,000: TBA; 45% question: Number of people who got it right: TBA; Number of people who are out: TBA; Number of people who passed: TBA; Prize Pot: TBA; Number of people who left with $1,000: TBA; 40% question: Number of people who got it right: TBA; Number of people who are out: TBA; Number of people who passed: TBA; Prize Pot: TBA; Number of people who left with $1,000: TBA; 35% question: Number of people who got it right: TBA; Number of people who are out: TBA; Number of people who passed: TBA; Prize Pot: TBA; Number of people who left with $1,000: TBA; 30% question: Number of people who got it right: TBA; Number of people who are out: TBA; Number of people who passed: TBA; Prize Pot: TBA; Number of people who left with $1,000: TBA; 25% question: Number of people who got it right: TBA; Number of people who are out: TBA; Number of people who passed: TBA; Prize Pot: TBA; Number of people who left with $1,000: TBA; 20% question: Number of people who got it right: TBA; Number of people who are out: TBA; Number of people who passed: TBA; Prize Pot: TBA; Number of people who left with $1,000: TBA; 15% question: Number of people who got it right: TBA; Number of people who are out: TBA; Number of people who passed: TBA; Prize Pot: TBA; Number of people who left with $1,000: TBA; 10% question: Number of people who got it right: TBA; Number of people who are out: TBA; Number of people who passed: TBA; Prize Pot: TBA; Number of people who left with $1,000: TBA; 5% question: Number of people who got it right: TBA; Number of people who are out: TBA; Number of people who passed: TBA; Prize Pot: TBA; Number of people who left with $1,000: TBA; Names of the remaining contestants: TBA; 1% question: Contestant who won: TBA; Contestant who lost: TBA; Contestant who left: TBA
14	4	"Episode 4"	21 February 2024	848,000
Episode 4 Results: 90% Question: Number of people who got it right: TBA; Number of people who are out: TBA; Number of people who passed: TBA; Prize Pot: TBA; Number of people who left with $1,000: TBA; 80% question: Number of people who got it right: TBA; Number of people who are out: TBA; Number of people who passed: TBA; Prize Pot: TBA; Number of people who left with $1,000: TBA; 70% question: Number of people who got it right: TBA; Number of people who are out: TBA; Number of people who passed: TBA; Prize Pot: TBA; Number of people who left with $1,000: TBA; 60% question: Number of people who got it right: TBA; Number of people who are out: TBA; Number of people who passed: TBA; Prize Pot: TBA; Number of people who left with $1,000: TBA; 50% question: Number of people who got it right: TBA; Number of people who are out: TBA; Number of people who passed: TBA; Prize Pot: TBA; Number of people who left with $1,000: TBA; 45% question: Number of people who got it right: TBA; Number of people who are out: TBA; Number of people who passed: TBA; Prize Pot: TBA; Number of people who left with $1,000: TBA; 40% question: Number of people who got it right: TBA; Number of people who are out: TBA; Number of people who passed: TBA; Prize Pot: TBA; Number of people who left with $1,000: TBA; 35% question: Number of people who got it right: TBA; Number of people who are out: TBA; Number of people who passed: TBA; Prize Pot: TBA; Number of people who left with $1,000: TBA; 30% question: Number of people who got it right: TBA; Number of people who are out: TBA; Number of people who passed: TBA; Prize Pot: TBA; Number of people who left with $1,000: TBA; 25% question: Number of people who got it right: TBA; Number of people who are out: TBA; Number of people who passed: TBA; Prize Pot: TBA; Number of people who left with $1,000: TBA; 20% question: Number of people who got it right: TBA; Number of people who are out: TBA; Number of people who passed: TBA; Prize Pot: TBA; Number of people who left with $1,000: TBA; 15% question: Number of people who got it right: TBA; Number of people who are out: TBA; Number of people who passed: TBA; Prize Pot: TBA; Number of people who left with $1,000: TBA; 10% question: Number of people who got it right: TBA; Number of people who are out: TBA; Number of people who passed: TBA; Prize Pot: TBA; Number of people who left with $1,000: TBA; 5% question: Number of people who got it right: TBA; Number of people who are out: TBA; Number of people who passed: TBA; Prize Pot: TBA; Number of people who left with $1,000: TBA; Names of the remaining contestants: TBA; 1% question: Contestant who won: TBA; Contestant who lost: TBA; Contestant who left: TBA
15	5	"Episode 5"	28 February 2024	797,000
Episode 5 Results: 90% Question: Number of people who got it right: TBA; Number of people who are out: TBA; Number of people who passed: TBA; Prize Pot: TBA; Number of people who left with $1,000: TBA; 80% question: Number of people who got it right: TBA; Number of people who are out: TBA; Number of people who passed: TBA; Prize Pot: TBA; Number of people who left with $1,000: TBA; 70% question: Number of people who got it right: TBA; Number of people who are out: TBA; Number of people who passed: TBA; Prize Pot: TBA; Number of people who left with $1,000: TBA; 60% question: Number of people who got it right: TBA; Number of people who are out: TBA; Number of people who passed: TBA; Prize Pot: TBA; Number of people who left with $1,000: TBA; 50% question: Number of people who got it right: TBA; Number of people who are out: TBA; Number of people who passed: TBA; Prize Pot: TBA; Number of people who left with $1,000: TBA; 45% question: Number of people who got it right: TBA; Number of people who are out: TBA; Number of people who passed: TBA; Prize Pot: TBA; Number of people who left with $1,000: TBA; 40% question: Number of people who got it right: TBA; Number of people who are out: TBA; Number of people who passed: TBA; Prize Pot: TBA; Number of people who left with $1,000: TBA; 35% question: Number of people who got it right: TBA; Number of people who are out: TBA; Number of people who passed: TBA; Prize Pot: TBA; Number of people who left with $1,000: TBA; 30% question: Number of people who got it right: TBA; Number of people who are out: TBA; Number of people who passed: TBA; Prize Pot: TBA; Number of people who left with $1,000: TBA; 25% question: Number of people who got it right: TBA; Number of people who are out: TBA; Number of people who passed: TBA; Prize Pot: TBA; Number of people who left with $1,000: TBA; 20% question: Number of people who got it right: TBA; Number of people who are out: TBA; Number of people who passed: TBA; Prize Pot: TBA; Number of people who left with $1,000: TBA; 15% question: Number of people who got it right: TBA; Number of people who are out: TBA; Number of people who passed: TBA; Prize Pot: TBA; Number of people who left with $1,000: TBA; 10% question: Number of people who got it right: TBA; Number of people who are out: TBA; Number of people who passed: TBA; Prize Pot: TBA; Number of people who left with $1,000: TBA; 5% question: Number of people who got it right: TBA; Number of people who are out: TBA; Number of people who passed: TBA; Prize Pot: TBA; Number of people who left with $1,000: TBA; Names of the remaining contestants: TBA; 1% question: Contestant who won: TBA; Contestant who lost: TBA; Contestant who left: TBA
16	6	"Episode 6"	6 March 2024	769,000
Episode 6 Results: 90% Question: Number of people who got it right: TBA; Number of people who are out: TBA; Number of people who passed: TBA; Prize Pot: TBA; Number of people who left with $1,000: TBA; 80% question: Number of people who got it right: TBA; Number of people who are out: TBA; Number of people who passed: TBA; Prize Pot: TBA; Number of people who left with $1,000: TBA; 70% question: Number of people who got it right: TBA; Number of people who are out: TBA; Number of people who passed: TBA; Prize Pot: TBA; Number of people who left with $1,000: TBA; 60% question: Number of people who got it right: TBA; Number of people who are out: TBA; Number of people who passed: TBA; Prize Pot: TBA; Number of people who left with $1,000: TBA; 50% question: Number of people who got it right: TBA; Number of people who are out: TBA; Number of people who passed: TBA; Prize Pot: TBA; Number of people who left with $1,000: TBA; 45% question: Number of people who got it right: TBA; Number of people who are out: TBA; Number of people who passed: TBA; Prize Pot: TBA; Number of people who left with $1,000: TBA; 40% question: Number of people who got it right: TBA; Number of people who are out: TBA; Number of people who passed: TBA; Prize Pot: TBA; Number of people who left with $1,000: TBA; 35% question: Number of people who got it right: TBA; Number of people who are out: TBA; Number of people who passed: TBA; Prize Pot: TBA; Number of people who left with $1,000: TBA; 30% question: Number of people who got it right: TBA; Number of people who are out: TBA; Number of people who passed: TBA; Prize Pot: TBA; Number of people who left with $1,000: TBA; 25% question: Number of people who got it right: TBA; Number of people who are out: TBA; Number of people who passed: TBA; Prize Pot: TBA; Number of people who left with $1,000: TBA; 20% question: Number of people who got it right: TBA; Number of people who are out: TBA; Number of people who passed: TBA; Prize Pot: TBA; Number of people who left with $1,000: TBA; 15% question: Number of people who got it right: TBA; Number of people who are out: TBA; Number of people who passed: TBA; Prize Pot: TBA; Number of people who left with $1,000: TBA; 10% question: Number of people who got it right: TBA; Number of people who are out: TBA; Number of people who passed: TBA; Prize Pot: TBA; Number of people who left with $1,000: TBA; 5% question: Number of people who got it right: TBA; Number of people who are out: TBA; Number of people who passed: TBA; Prize Pot: TBA; Number of people who left with $1,000: TBA; Names of the remaining contestants: TBA; 1% question: Contestant who won: TBA; Contestant who lost: TBA; Contestant who left: TBA
17	7	"Episode 7"	13 March 2024	795,000
Episode 7 Results: 90% Question: Number of people who got it right: TBA; Number of people who are out: TBA; Number of people who passed: TBA; Prize Pot: TBA; Number of people who left with $1,000: TBA; 80% question: Number of people who got it right: TBA; Number of people who are out: TBA; Number of people who passed: TBA; Prize Pot: TBA; Number of people who left with $1,000: TBA; 70% question: Number of people who got it right: TBA; Number of people who are out: TBA; Number of people who passed: TBA; Prize Pot: TBA; Number of people who left with $1,000: TBA; 60% question: Number of people who got it right: TBA; Number of people who are out: TBA; Number of people who passed: TBA; Prize Pot: TBA; Number of people who left with $1,000: TBA; 50% question: Number of people who got it right: TBA; Number of people who are out: TBA; Number of people who passed: TBA; Prize Pot: TBA; Number of people who left with $1,000: TBA; 45% question: Number of people who got it right: TBA; Number of people who are out: TBA; Number of people who passed: TBA; Prize Pot: TBA; Number of people who left with $1,000: TBA; 40% question: Number of people who got it right: TBA; Number of people who are out: TBA; Number of people who passed: TBA; Prize Pot: TBA; Number of people who left with $1,000: TBA; 35% question: Number of people who got it right: TBA; Number of people who are out: TBA; Number of people who passed: TBA; Prize Pot: TBA; Number of people who left with $1,000: TBA; 30% question: Number of people who got it right: TBA; Number of people who are out: TBA; Number of people who passed: TBA; Prize Pot: TBA; Number of people who left with $1,000: TBA; 25% question: Number of people who got it right: TBA; Number of people who are out: TBA; Number of people who passed: TBA; Prize Pot: TBA; Number of people who left with $1,000: TBA; 20% question: Number of people who got it right: TBA; Number of people who are out: TBA; Number of people who passed: TBA; Prize Pot: TBA; Number of people who left with $1,000: TBA; 15% question: Number of people who got it right: TBA; Number of people who are out: TBA; Number of people who passed: TBA; Prize Pot: TBA; Number of people who left with $1,000: TBA; 10% question: Number of people who got it right: TBA; Number of people who are out: TBA; Number of people who passed: TBA; Prize Pot: TBA; Number of people who left with $1,000: TBA; 5% question: Number of people who got it right: TBA; Number of people who are out: TBA; Number of people who passed: TBA; Prize Pot: TBA; Number of people who left with $1,000: TBA; Names of the remaining contestants: TBA; 1% question: Contestant who won: TBA; Contestant who lost: TBA; Contestant who left: TBA
18	8	"Episode 8"	20 March 2024	814,000
Episode 8 Results: 90% Question: Number of people who got it right: TBA; Number of people who are out: TBA; Number of people who passed: TBA; Prize Pot: TBA; Number of people who left with $1,000: TBA; 80% question: Number of people who got it right: TBA; Number of people who are out: TBA; Number of people who passed: TBA; Prize Pot: TBA; Number of people who left with $1,000: TBA; 70% question: Number of people who got it right: TBA; Number of people who are out: TBA; Number of people who passed: TBA; Prize Pot: TBA; Number of people who left with $1,000: TBA; 60% question: Number of people who got it right: TBA; Number of people who are out: TBA; Number of people who passed: TBA; Prize Pot: TBA; Number of people who left with $1,000: TBA; 50% question: Number of people who got it right: TBA; Number of people who are out: TBA; Number of people who passed: TBA; Prize Pot: TBA; Number of people who left with $1,000: TBA; 45% question: Number of people who got it right: TBA; Number of people who are out: TBA; Number of people who passed: TBA; Prize Pot: TBA; Number of people who left with $1,000: TBA; 40% question: Number of people who got it right: TBA; Number of people who are out: TBA; Number of people who passed: TBA; Prize Pot: TBA; Number of people who left with $1,000: TBA; 35% question: Number of people who got it right: TBA; Number of people who are out: TBA; Number of people who passed: TBA; Prize Pot: TBA; Number of people who left with $1,000: TBA; 30% question: Number of people who got it right: TBA; Number of people who are out: TBA; Number of people who passed: TBA; Prize Pot: TBA; Number of people who left with $1,000: TBA; 25% question: Number of people who got it right: TBA; Number of people who are out: TBA; Number of people who passed: TBA; Prize Pot: TBA; Number of people who left with $1,000: TBA; 20% question: Number of people who got it right: TBA; Number of people who are out: TBA; Number of people who passed: TBA; Prize Pot: TBA; Number of people who left with $1,000: TBA; 15% question: Number of people who got it right: TBA; Number of people who are out: TBA; Number of people who passed: TBA; Prize Pot: TBA; Number of people who left with $1,000: TBA; 10% question: Number of people who got it right: TBA; Number of people who are out: TBA; Number of people who passed: TBA; Prize Pot: TBA; Number of people who left with $1,000: TBA; 5% question: Number of people who got it right: TBA; Number of people who are out: TBA; Number of people who passed: TBA; Prize Pot: TBA; Number of people who left with $1,000: TBA; Names of the remaining contestants: TBA; 1% question: Contestant who won: TBA; Contestant who lost: TBA; Contestant who left: TBA
19	9	"Episode 9"	26 March 2024	906,000
Episode 9 Results: 90% Question: Number of people who got it right: TBA; Number of people who are out: TBA; Number of people who passed: TBA; Prize Pot: TBA; Number of people who left with $1,000: TBA; 80% question: Number of people who got it right: TBA; Number of people who are out: TBA; Number of people who passed: TBA; Prize Pot: TBA; Number of people who left with $1,000: TBA; 70% question: Number of people who got it right: TBA; Number of people who are out: TBA; Number of people who passed: TBA; Prize Pot: TBA; Number of people who left with $1,000: TBA; 60% question: Number of people who got it right: TBA; Number of people who are out: TBA; Number of people who passed: TBA; Prize Pot: TBA; Number of people who left with $1,000: TBA; 50% question: Number of people who got it right: TBA; Number of people who are out: TBA; Number of people who passed: TBA; Prize Pot: TBA; Number of people who left with $1,000: TBA; 45% question: Number of people who got it right: TBA; Number of people who are out: TBA; Number of people who passed: TBA; Prize Pot: TBA; Number of people who left with $1,000: TBA; 40% question: Number of people who got it right: TBA; Number of people who are out: TBA; Number of people who passed: TBA; Prize Pot: TBA; Number of people who left with $1,000: TBA; 35% question: Number of people who got it right: TBA; Number of people who are out: TBA; Number of people who passed: TBA; Prize Pot: TBA; Number of people who left with $1,000: TBA; 30% question: Number of people who got it right: TBA; Number of people who are out: TBA; Number of people who passed: TBA; Prize Pot: TBA; Number of people who left with $1,000: TBA; 25% question: Number of people who got it right: TBA; Number of people who are out: TBA; Number of people who passed: TBA; Prize Pot: TBA; Number of people who left with $1,000: TBA; 20% question: Number of people who got it right: TBA; Number of people who are out: TBA; Number of people who passed: TBA; Prize Pot: TBA; Number of people who left with $1,000: TBA; 15% question: Number of people who got it right: TBA; Number of people who are out: TBA; Number of people who passed: TBA; Prize Pot: TBA; Number of people who left with $1,000: TBA; 10% question: Number of people who got it right: TBA; Number of people who are out: TBA; Number of people who passed: TBA; Prize Pot: TBA; Number of people who left with $1,000: TBA; 5% question: Number of people who got it right: TBA; Number of people who are out: TBA; Number of people who passed: TBA; Prize Pot: TBA; Number of people who left with $1,000: TBA; Names of the remaining contestants: TBA; 1% question: Contestant who won: TBA; Contestant who lost: TBA; Contestant who left: TBA
20	10	"Episode 10"	7 April 2024	853,000
Episode 10 Results: 90% Question: Number of people who got it right: TBA; Number of people who are out: TBA; Number of people who passed: TBA; Prize Pot: TBA; Number of people who left with $1,000: TBA; 80% question: Number of people who got it right: TBA; Number of people who are out: TBA; Number of people who passed: TBA; Prize Pot: TBA; Number of people who left with $1,000: TBA; 70% question: Number of people who got it right: TBA; Number of people who are out: TBA; Number of people who passed: TBA; Prize Pot: TBA; Number of people who left with $1,000: TBA; 60% question: Number of people who got it right: TBA; Number of people who are out: TBA; Number of people who passed: TBA; Prize Pot: TBA; Number of people who left with $1,000: TBA; 50% question: Number of people who got it right: TBA; Number of people who are out: TBA; Number of people who passed: TBA; Prize Pot: TBA; Number of people who left with $1,000: TBA; 45% question: Number of people who got it right: TBA; Number of people who are out: TBA; Number of people who passed: TBA; Prize Pot: TBA; Number of people who left with $1,000: TBA; 40% question: Number of people who got it right: TBA; Number of people who are out: TBA; Number of people who passed: TBA; Prize Pot: TBA; Number of people who left with $1,000: TBA; 35% question: Number of people who got it right: TBA; Number of people who are out: TBA; Number of people who passed: TBA; Prize Pot: TBA; Number of people who left with $1,000: TBA; 30% question: Number of people who got it right: TBA; Number of people who are out: TBA; Number of people who passed: TBA; Prize Pot: TBA; Number of people who left with $1,000: TBA; 25% question: Number of people who got it right: TBA; Number of people who are out: TBA; Number of people who passed: TBA; Prize Pot: TBA; Number of people who left with $1,000: TBA; 20% question: Number of people who got it right: TBA; Number of people who are out: TBA; Number of people who passed: TBA; Prize Pot: TBA; Number of people who left with $1,000: TBA; 15% question: Number of people who got it right: TBA; Number of people who are out: TBA; Number of people who passed: TBA; Prize Pot: TBA; Number of people who left with $1,000: TBA; 10% question: Number of people who got it right: TBA; Number of people who are out: TBA; Number of people who passed: TBA; Prize Pot: TBA; Number of people who left with $1,000: TBA; 5% question: Number of people who got it right: TBA; Number of people who are out: TBA; Number of people who passed: TBA; Prize Pot: TBA; Number of people who left with $1,000: TBA; Names of the remaining contestants: TBA; 1% question: Contestant who won: TBA; Contestant who lost: TBA; Contestant who left: TBA

=== Season 3 (2025) ===
No. overall	No. in season	Title	Original release date	Total TV Audience
21	1	"Episode 1"	18 May 2025	1,053,000
Episode 1 Results: 90% Question: Number of people who got it right: TBA; Number of people who are out: TBA; Number of people who passed: TBA; Prize Pot: TBA; Number of people who left with $1,000: TBA; 80% question: Number of people who got it right: TBA; Number of people who are out: TBA; Number of people who passed: TBA; Prize Pot: TBA; Number of people who left with $1,000: TBA; 70% question: Number of people who got it right: TBA; Number of people who are out: TBA; Number of people who passed: TBA; Prize Pot: TBA; Number of people who left with $1,000: TBA; 60% question: Number of people who got it right: TBA; Number of people who are out: TBA; Number of people who passed: TBA; Prize Pot: TBA; Number of people who left with $1,000: TBA; 50% question: Number of people who got it right: TBA; Number of people who are out: TBA; Number of people who passed: TBA; Prize Pot: TBA; Number of people who left with $1,000: TBA; 45% question: Number of people who got it right: TBA; Number of people who are out: TBA; Number of people who passed: TBA; Prize Pot: TBA; Number of people who left with $1,000: TBA; 40% question: Number of people who got it right: TBA; Number of people who are out: TBA; Number of people who passed: TBA; Prize Pot: TBA; Number of people who left with $1,000: TBA; 35% question: Number of people who got it right: TBA; Number of people who are out: TBA; Number of people who passed: TBA; Prize Pot: TBA; Number of people who left with $1,000: TBA; 30% question: Number of people who got it right: TBA; Number of people who are out: TBA; Number of people who passed: TBA; Prize Pot: TBA; Number of people who left with $1,000: TBA; 25% question: Number of people who got it right: TBA; Number of people who are out: TBA; Number of people who passed: TBA; Prize Pot: TBA; Number of people who left with $1,000: TBA; 20% question: Number of people who got it right: TBA; Number of people who are out: TBA; Number of people who passed: TBA; Prize Pot: TBA; Number of people who left with $1,000: TBA; 15% question: Number of people who got it right: TBA; Number of people who are out: TBA; Number of people who passed: TBA; Prize Pot: TBA; Number of people who left with $1,000: TBA; 10% question: Number of people who got it right: TBA; Number of people who are out: TBA; Number of people who passed: TBA; Prize Pot: TBA; Number of people who left with $1,000: TBA; 5% question: Number of people who got it right: TBA; Number of people who are out: TBA; Number of people who passed: TBA; Prize Pot: TBA; Number of people who left with $1,000: TBA; Names of the remaining contestants: TBA; 1% question: Contestant who won: TBA; Contestant who lost: TBA; Contestant who left: TBA
22	2	"Episode 2" (Note: This episode is a "State v State" special.)	28 January 2025	779,000
Episode 2 Results: 90% Question: Number of people who got it right: TBA; Number of people who are out: TBA; Number of people who passed: TBA; Prize Pot: TBA; Number of people who left with $1,000: TBA; 80% question: Number of people who got it right: TBA; Number of people who are out: TBA; Number of people who passed: TBA; Prize Pot: TBA; Number of people who left with $1,000: TBA; 70% question: Number of people who got it right: TBA; Number of people who are out: TBA; Number of people who passed: TBA; Prize Pot: TBA; Number of people who left with $1,000: TBA; 60% question: Number of people who got it right: TBA; Number of people who are out: TBA; Number of people who passed: TBA; Prize Pot: TBA; Number of people who left with $1,000: TBA; 50% question: Number of people who got it right: TBA; Number of people who are out: TBA; Number of people who passed: TBA; Prize Pot: TBA; Number of people who left with $1,000: TBA; 45% question: Number of people who got it right: TBA; Number of people who are out: TBA; Number of people who passed: TBA; Prize Pot: TBA; Number of people who left with $1,000: TBA; 40% question: Number of people who got it right: TBA; Number of people who are out: TBA; Number of people who passed: TBA; Prize Pot: TBA; Number of people who left with $1,000: TBA; 35% question: Number of people who got it right: TBA; Number of people who are out: TBA; Number of people who passed: TBA; Prize Pot: TBA; Number of people who left with $1,000: TBA; 30% question: Number of people who got it right: TBA; Number of people who are out: TBA; Number of people who passed: TBA; Prize Pot: TBA; Number of people who left with $1,000: TBA; 25% question: Number of people who got it right: TBA; Number of people who are out: TBA; Number of people who passed: TBA; Prize Pot: TBA; Number of people who left with $1,000: TBA; 20% question: Number of people who got it right: TBA; Number of people who are out: TBA; Number of people who passed: TBA; Prize Pot: TBA; Number of people who left with $1,000: TBA; 15% question: Number of people who got it right: TBA; Number of people who are out: TBA; Number of people who passed: TBA; Prize Pot: TBA; Number of people who left with $1,000: TBA; 10% question: Number of people who got it right: TBA; Number of people who are out: TBA; Number of people who passed: TBA; Prize Pot: TBA; Number of people who left with $1,000: TBA; 5% question: Number of people who got it right: TBA; Number of people who are out: TBA; Number of people who passed: TBA; Prize Pot: TBA; Number of people who left with $1,000: TBA; Names of the remaining contestants: TBA; 1% question: Contestant who won: TBA; Contestant who lost: TBA; Contestant who left: TBA
23	3	"Episode 3"	11 June 2025	712,000
Episode 3 Results: 90% Question: Number of people who got it right: TBA; Number of people who are out: TBA; Number of people who passed: TBA; Prize Pot: TBA; Number of people who left with $1,000: TBA; 80% question: Number of people who got it right: TBA; Number of people who are out: TBA; Number of people who passed: TBA; Prize Pot: TBA; Number of people who left with $1,000: TBA; 70% question: Number of people who got it right: TBA; Number of people who are out: TBA; Number of people who passed: TBA; Prize Pot: TBA; Number of people who left with $1,000: TBA; 60% question: Number of people who got it right: TBA; Number of people who are out: TBA; Number of people who passed: TBA; Prize Pot: TBA; Number of people who left with $1,000: TBA; 50% question: Number of people who got it right: TBA; Number of people who are out: TBA; Number of people who passed: TBA; Prize Pot: TBA; Number of people who left with $1,000: TBA; 45% question: Number of people who got it right: TBA; Number of people who are out: TBA; Number of people who passed: TBA; Prize Pot: TBA; Number of people who left with $1,000: TBA; 40% question: Number of people who got it right: TBA; Number of people who are out: TBA; Number of people who passed: TBA; Prize Pot: TBA; Number of people who left with $1,000: TBA; 35% question: Number of people who got it right: TBA; Number of people who are out: TBA; Number of people who passed: TBA; Prize Pot: TBA; Number of people who left with $1,000: TBA; 30% question: Number of people who got it right: TBA; Number of people who are out: TBA; Number of people who passed: TBA; Prize Pot: TBA; Number of people who left with $1,000: TBA; 25% question: Number of people who got it right: TBA; Number of people who are out: TBA; Number of people who passed: TBA; Prize Pot: TBA; Number of people who left with $1,000: TBA; 20% question: Number of people who got it right: TBA; Number of people who are out: TBA; Number of people who passed: TBA; Prize Pot: TBA; Number of people who left with $1,000: TBA; 15% question: Number of people who got it right: TBA; Number of people who are out: TBA; Number of people who passed: TBA; Prize Pot: TBA; Number of people who left with $1,000: TBA; 10% question: Number of people who got it right: TBA; Number of people who are out: TBA; Number of people who passed: TBA; Prize Pot: TBA; Number of people who left with $1,000: TBA; 5% question: Number of people who got it right: TBA; Number of people who are out: TBA; Number of people who passed: TBA; Prize Pot: TBA; Number of people who left with $1,000: TBA; Names of the remaining contestants: TBA; 1% question: Contestant who won: TBA; Contestant who lost: TBA; Contestant who left: TBA
24	4	"Episode 4"	27 April 2025	1,116,000
Episode 4 Results: 90% Question: Number of people who got it right: TBA; Number of people who are out: TBA; Number of people who passed: TBA; Prize Pot: TBA; Number of people who left with $1,000: TBA; 80% question: Number of people who got it right: TBA; Number of people who are out: TBA; Number of people who passed: TBA; Prize Pot: TBA; Number of people who left with $1,000: TBA; 70% question: Number of people who got it right: TBA; Number of people who are out: TBA; Number of people who passed: TBA; Prize Pot: TBA; Number of people who left with $1,000: TBA; 60% question: Number of people who got it right: TBA; Number of people who are out: TBA; Number of people who passed: TBA; Prize Pot: TBA; Number of people who left with $1,000: TBA; 50% question: Number of people who got it right: TBA; Number of people who are out: TBA; Number of people who passed: TBA; Prize Pot: TBA; Number of people who left with $1,000: TBA; 45% question: Number of people who got it right: TBA; Number of people who are out: TBA; Number of people who passed: TBA; Prize Pot: TBA; Number of people who left with $1,000: TBA; 40% question: Number of people who got it right: TBA; Number of people who are out: TBA; Number of people who passed: TBA; Prize Pot: TBA; Number of people who left with $1,000: TBA; 35% question: Number of people who got it right: TBA; Number of people who are out: TBA; Number of people who passed: TBA; Prize Pot: TBA; Number of people who left with $1,000: TBA; 30% question: Number of people who got it right: TBA; Number of people who are out: TBA; Number of people who passed: TBA; Prize Pot: TBA; Number of people who left with $1,000: TBA; 25% question: Number of people who got it right: TBA; Number of people who are out: TBA; Number of people who passed: TBA; Prize Pot: TBA; Number of people who left with $1,000: TBA; 20% question: Number of people who got it right: TBA; Number of people who are out: TBA; Number of people who passed: TBA; Prize Pot: TBA; Number of people who left with $1,000: TBA; 15% question: Number of people who got it right: TBA; Number of people who are out: TBA; Number of people who passed: TBA; Prize Pot: TBA; Number of people who left with $1,000: TBA; 10% question: Number of people who got it right: TBA; Number of people who are out: TBA; Number of people who passed: TBA; Prize Pot: TBA; Number of people who left with $1,000: TBA; 5% question: Number of people who got it right: TBA; Number of people who are out: TBA; Number of people who passed: TBA; Prize Pot: TBA; Number of people who left with $1,000: TBA; Names of the remaining contestants: TBA; 1% question: Contestant who won: TBA; Contestant who lost: TBA; Contestant who left: TBA
25	5	"Episode 5"	11 May 2025	1,057,000
Episode 5 Results: 90% Question: Number of people who got it right: TBA; Number of people who are out: TBA; Number of people who passed: TBA; Prize Pot: TBA; Number of people who left with $1,000: TBA; 80% question: Number of people who got it right: TBA; Number of people who are out: TBA; Number of people who passed: TBA; Prize Pot: TBA; Number of people who left with $1,000: TBA; 70% question: Number of people who got it right: TBA; Number of people who are out: TBA; Number of people who passed: TBA; Prize Pot: TBA; Number of people who left with $1,000: TBA; 60% question: Number of people who got it right: TBA; Number of people who are out: TBA; Number of people who passed: TBA; Prize Pot: TBA; Number of people who left with $1,000: TBA; 50% question: Number of people who got it right: TBA; Number of people who are out: TBA; Number of people who passed: TBA; Prize Pot: TBA; Number of people who left with $1,000: TBA; 45% question: Number of people who got it right: TBA; Number of people who are out: TBA; Number of people who passed: TBA; Prize Pot: TBA; Number of people who left with $1,000: TBA; 40% question: Number of people who got it right: TBA; Number of people who are out: TBA; Number of people who passed: TBA; Prize Pot: TBA; Number of people who left with $1,000: TBA; 35% question: Number of people who got it right: TBA; Number of people who are out: TBA; Number of people who passed: TBA; Prize Pot: TBA; Number of people who left with $1,000: TBA; 30% question: Number of people who got it right: TBA; Number of people who are out: TBA; Number of people who passed: TBA; Prize Pot: TBA; Number of people who left with $1,000: TBA; 25% question: Number of people who got it right: TBA; Number of people who are out: TBA; Number of people who passed: TBA; Prize Pot: TBA; Number of people who left with $1,000: TBA; 20% question: Number of people who got it right: TBA; Number of people who are out: TBA; Number of people who passed: TBA; Prize Pot: TBA; Number of people who left with $1,000: TBA; 15% question: Number of people who got it right: TBA; Number of people who are out: TBA; Number of people who passed: TBA; Prize Pot: TBA; Number of people who left with $1,000: TBA; 10% question: Number of people who got it right: TBA; Number of people who are out: TBA; Number of people who passed: TBA; Prize Pot: TBA; Number of people who left with $1,000: TBA; 5% question: Number of people who got it right: TBA; Number of people who are out: TBA; Number of people who passed: TBA; Prize Pot: TBA; Number of people who left with $1,000: TBA; Names of the remaining contestants: TBA; 1% question: Contestant who won: TBA; Contestant who lost: TBA; Contestant who left: TBA
26	6	"Episode 6"	4 May 2025	880,000
Episode 6 Results: 90% Question: Number of people who got it right: TBA; Number of people who are out: TBA; Number of people who passed: TBA; Prize Pot: TBA; Number of people who left with $1,000: TBA; 80% question: Number of people who got it right: TBA; Number of people who are out: TBA; Number of people who passed: TBA; Prize Pot: TBA; Number of people who left with $1,000: TBA; 70% question: Number of people who got it right: TBA; Number of people who are out: TBA; Number of people who passed: TBA; Prize Pot: TBA; Number of people who left with $1,000: TBA; 60% question: Number of people who got it right: TBA; Number of people who are out: TBA; Number of people who passed: TBA; Prize Pot: TBA; Number of people who left with $1,000: TBA; 50% question: Number of people who got it right: TBA; Number of people who are out: TBA; Number of people who passed: TBA; Prize Pot: TBA; Number of people who left with $1,000: TBA; 45% question: Number of people who got it right: TBA; Number of people who are out: TBA; Number of people who passed: TBA; Prize Pot: TBA; Number of people who left with $1,000: TBA; 40% question: Number of people who got it right: TBA; Number of people who are out: TBA; Number of people who passed: TBA; Prize Pot: TBA; Number of people who left with $1,000: TBA; 35% question: Number of people who got it right: TBA; Number of people who are out: TBA; Number of people who passed: TBA; Prize Pot: TBA; Number of people who left with $1,000: TBA; 30% question: Number of people who got it right: TBA; Number of people who are out: TBA; Number of people who passed: TBA; Prize Pot: TBA; Number of people who left with $1,000: TBA; 25% question: Number of people who got it right: TBA; Number of people who are out: TBA; Number of people who passed: TBA; Prize Pot: TBA; Number of people who left with $1,000: TBA; 20% question: Number of people who got it right: TBA; Number of people who are out: TBA; Number of people who passed: TBA; Prize Pot: TBA; Number of people who left with $1,000: TBA; 15% question: Number of people who got it right: TBA; Number of people who are out: TBA; Number of people who passed: TBA; Prize Pot: TBA; Number of people who left with $1,000: TBA; 10% question: Number of people who got it right: TBA; Number of people who are out: TBA; Number of people who passed: TBA; Prize Pot: TBA; Number of people who left with $1,000: TBA; 5% question: Number of people who got it right: TBA; Number of people who are out: TBA; Number of people who passed: TBA; Prize Pot: TBA; Number of people who left with $1,000: TBA; Names of the remaining contestants: TBA; 1% question: Contestant who won: TBA; Contestant who lost: TBA; Contestant who left: TBA
27	7	"Episode 7"	25 May 2025	992,000
Episode 7 Results: 90% Question: Number of people who got it right: TBA; Number of people who are out: TBA; Number of people who passed: TBA; Prize Pot: TBA; Number of people who left with $1,000: TBA; 80% question: Number of people who got it right: TBA; Number of people who are out: TBA; Number of people who passed: TBA; Prize Pot: TBA; Number of people who left with $1,000: TBA; 70% question: Number of people who got it right: TBA; Number of people who are out: TBA; Number of people who passed: TBA; Prize Pot: TBA; Number of people who left with $1,000: TBA; 60% question: Number of people who got it right: TBA; Number of people who are out: TBA; Number of people who passed: TBA; Prize Pot: TBA; Number of people who left with $1,000: TBA; 50% question: Number of people who got it right: TBA; Number of people who are out: TBA; Number of people who passed: TBA; Prize Pot: TBA; Number of people who left with $1,000: TBA; 45% question: Number of people who got it right: TBA; Number of people who are out: TBA; Number of people who passed: TBA; Prize Pot: TBA; Number of people who left with $1,000: TBA; 40% question: Number of people who got it right: TBA; Number of people who are out: TBA; Number of people who passed: TBA; Prize Pot: TBA; Number of people who left with $1,000: TBA; 35% question: Number of people who got it right: TBA; Number of people who are out: TBA; Number of people who passed: TBA; Prize Pot: TBA; Number of people who left with $1,000: TBA; 30% question: Number of people who got it right: TBA; Number of people who are out: TBA; Number of people who passed: TBA; Prize Pot: TBA; Number of people who left with $1,000: TBA; 25% question: Number of people who got it right: TBA; Number of people who are out: TBA; Number of people who passed: TBA; Prize Pot: TBA; Number of people who left with $1,000: TBA; 20% question: Number of people who got it right: TBA; Number of people who are out: TBA; Number of people who passed: TBA; Prize Pot: TBA; Number of people who left with $1,000: TBA; 15% question: Number of people who got it right: TBA; Number of people who are out: TBA; Number of people who passed: TBA; Prize Pot: TBA; Number of people who left with $1,000: TBA; 10% question: Number of people who got it right: TBA; Number of people who are out: TBA; Number of people who passed: TBA; Prize Pot: TBA; Number of people who left with $1,000: TBA; 5% question: Number of people who got it right: TBA; Number of people who are out: TBA; Number of people who passed: TBA; Prize Pot: TBA; Number of people who left with $1,000: TBA; Names of the remaining contestants: TBA; 1% question: Contestant who won: TBA; Contestant who lost: TBA; Contestant who left: TBA
28	8	"Episode 8"	4 June 2025	413,000
Episode 8 Results: 90% Question: Number of people who got it right: TBA; Number of people who are out: TBA; Number of people who passed: TBA; Prize Pot: TBA; Number of people who left with $1,000: TBA; 80% question: Number of people who got it right: TBA; Number of people who are out: TBA; Number of people who passed: TBA; Prize Pot: TBA; Number of people who left with $1,000: TBA; 70% question: Number of people who got it right: TBA; Number of people who are out: TBA; Number of people who passed: TBA; Prize Pot: TBA; Number of people who left with $1,000: TBA; 60% question: Number of people who got it right: TBA; Number of people who are out: TBA; Number of people who passed: TBA; Prize Pot: TBA; Number of people who left with $1,000: TBA; 50% question: Number of people who got it right: TBA; Number of people who are out: TBA; Number of people who passed: TBA; Prize Pot: TBA; Number of people who left with $1,000: TBA; 45% question: Number of people who got it right: TBA; Number of people who are out: TBA; Number of people who passed: TBA; Prize Pot: TBA; Number of people who left with $1,000: TBA; 40% question: Number of people who got it right: TBA; Number of people who are out: TBA; Number of people who passed: TBA; Prize Pot: TBA; Number of people who left with $1,000: TBA; 35% question: Number of people who got it right: TBA; Number of people who are out: TBA; Number of people who passed: TBA; Prize Pot: TBA; Number of people who left with $1,000: TBA; 30% question: Number of people who got it right: TBA; Number of people who are out: TBA; Number of people who passed: TBA; Prize Pot: TBA; Number of people who left with $1,000: TBA; 25% question: Number of people who got it right: TBA; Number of people who are out: TBA; Number of people who passed: TBA; Prize Pot: TBA; Number of people who left with $1,000: TBA; 20% question: Number of people who got it right: TBA; Number of people who are out: TBA; Number of people who passed: TBA; Prize Pot: TBA; Number of people who left with $1,000: TBA; 15% question: Number of people who got it right: TBA; Number of people who are out: TBA; Number of people who passed: TBA; Prize Pot: TBA; Number of people who left with $1,000: TBA; 10% question: Number of people who got it right: TBA; Number of people who are out: TBA; Number of people who passed: TBA; Prize Pot: TBA; Number of people who left with $1,000: TBA; 5% question: Number of people who got it right: TBA; Number of people who are out: TBA; Number of people who passed: TBA; Prize Pot: TBA; Number of people who left with $1,000: TBA; Names of the remaining contestants: TBA; 1% question: Contestant who won: TBA; Contestant who lost: TBA; Contestant who left: TBA

=== Season 4 (2026) ===
No. overall	No. in season	Title	Original release date	Total TV Audience
29	1	"Episode 1"	19 April 2026	953,000
Episode 1 Results: 90% Question: Number of people who got it right: TBA; Number of people who are out: TBA; Number of people who passed: TBA; Prize Pot: TBA; Number of people who left with $1,000: TBA; 80% question: Number of people who got it right: TBA; Number of people who are out: TBA; Number of people who passed: TBA; Prize Pot: TBA; Number of people who left with $1,000: TBA; 70% question: Number of people who got it right: TBA; Number of people who are out: TBA; Number of people who passed: TBA; Prize Pot: TBA; Number of people who left with $1,000: TBA; 60% question: Number of people who got it right: TBA; Number of people who are out: TBA; Number of people who passed: TBA; Prize Pot: TBA; Number of people who left with $1,000: TBA; 50% question: Number of people who got it right: TBA; Number of people who are out: TBA; Number of people who passed: TBA; Prize Pot: TBA; Number of people who left with $1,000: TBA; 45% question: Number of people who got it right: TBA; Number of people who are out: TBA; Number of people who passed: TBA; Prize Pot: TBA; Number of people who left with $1,000: TBA; 40% question: Number of people who got it right: TBA; Number of people who are out: TBA; Number of people who passed: TBA; Prize Pot: TBA; Number of people who left with $1,000: TBA; 35% question: Number of people who got it right: TBA; Number of people who are out: TBA; Number of people who passed: TBA; Prize Pot: TBA; Number of people who left with $1,000: TBA; 30% question: Number of people who got it right: TBA; Number of people who are out: TBA; Number of people who passed: TBA; Prize Pot: TBA; Number of people who left with $1,000: TBA; 25% question: Number of people who got it right: TBA; Number of people who are out: TBA; Number of people who passed: TBA; Prize Pot: TBA; Number of people who left with $1,000: TBA; 20% question: Number of people who got it right: TBA; Number of people who are out: TBA; Number of people who passed: TBA; Prize Pot: TBA; Number of people who left with $1,000: TBA; 15% question: Number of people who got it right: TBA; Number of people who are out: TBA; Number of people who passed: TBA; Prize Pot: TBA; Number of people who left with $1,000: TBA; 10% question: Number of people who got it right: TBA; Number of people who are out: TBA; Number of people who passed: TBA; Prize Pot: TBA; Number of people who left with $1,000: TBA; 5% question: Number of people who got it right: TBA; Number of people who are out: TBA; Number of people who passed: TBA; Prize Pot: TBA; Number of people who left with $1,000: TBA; Names of the remaining contestants: TBA; 1% question: Contestant who won: TBA; Contestant who lost: TBA; Contestant who left: TBA
30	2	"Episode 2"	26 April 2026	838,000
Episode 2 Results: 90% Question: Number of people who got it right: TBA; Number of people who are out: TBA; Number of people who passed: TBA; Prize Pot: TBA; Number of people who left with $1,000: TBA; 80% question: Number of people who got it right: TBA; Number of people who are out: TBA; Number of people who passed: TBA; Prize Pot: TBA; Number of people who left with $1,000: TBA; 70% question: Number of people who got it right: TBA; Number of people who are out: TBA; Number of people who passed: TBA; Prize Pot: TBA; Number of people who left with $1,000: TBA; 60% question: Number of people who got it right: TBA; Number of people who are out: TBA; Number of people who passed: TBA; Prize Pot: TBA; Number of people who left with $1,000: TBA; 50% question: Number of people who got it right: TBA; Number of people who are out: TBA; Number of people who passed: TBA; Prize Pot: TBA; Number of people who left with $1,000: TBA; 45% question: Number of people who got it right: TBA; Number of people who are out: TBA; Number of people who passed: TBA; Prize Pot: TBA; Number of people who left with $1,000: TBA; 40% question: Number of people who got it right: TBA; Number of people who are out: TBA; Number of people who passed: TBA; Prize Pot: TBA; Number of people who left with $1,000: TBA; 35% question: Number of people who got it right: TBA; Number of people who are out: TBA; Number of people who passed: TBA; Prize Pot: TBA; Number of people who left with $1,000: TBA; 30% question: Number of people who got it right: TBA; Number of people who are out: TBA; Number of people who passed: TBA; Prize Pot: TBA; Number of people who left with $1,000: TBA; 25% question: Number of people who got it right: TBA; Number of people who are out: TBA; Number of people who passed: TBA; Prize Pot: TBA; Number of people who left with $1,000: TBA; 20% question: Number of people who got it right: TBA; Number of people who are out: TBA; Number of people who passed: TBA; Prize Pot: TBA; Number of people who left with $1,000: TBA; 15% question: Number of people who got it right: TBA; Number of people who are out: TBA; Number of people who passed: TBA; Prize Pot: TBA; Number of people who left with $1,000: TBA; 10% question: Number of people who got it right: TBA; Number of people who are out: TBA; Number of people who passed: TBA; Prize Pot: TBA; Number of people who left with $1,000: TBA; 5% question: Number of people who got it right: TBA; Number of people who are out: TBA; Number of people who passed: TBA; Prize Pot: TBA; Number of people who left with $1,000: TBA; Names of the remaining contestants: TBA; 1% question: Contestant who won: TBA; Contestant who lost: TBA; Contestant who left: TBA
31	3	"Episode 3"	3 May 2026	852,000
Episode 3 Results: 90% Question: Number of people who got it right: TBA; Number of people who are out: TBA; Number of people who passed: TBA; Prize Pot: TBA; Number of people who left with $1,000: TBA; 80% question: Number of people who got it right: TBA; Number of people who are out: TBA; Number of people who passed: TBA; Prize Pot: TBA; Number of people who left with $1,000: TBA; 70% question: Number of people who got it right: TBA; Number of people who are out: TBA; Number of people who passed: TBA; Prize Pot: TBA; Number of people who left with $1,000: TBA; 60% question: Number of people who got it right: TBA; Number of people who are out: TBA; Number of people who passed: TBA; Prize Pot: TBA; Number of people who left with $1,000: TBA; 50% question: Number of people who got it right: TBA; Number of people who are out: TBA; Number of people who passed: TBA; Prize Pot: TBA; Number of people who left with $1,000: TBA; 45% question: Number of people who got it right: TBA; Number of people who are out: TBA; Number of people who passed: TBA; Prize Pot: TBA; Number of people who left with $1,000: TBA; 40% question: Number of people who got it right: TBA; Number of people who are out: TBA; Number of people who passed: TBA; Prize Pot: TBA; Number of people who left with $1,000: TBA; 35% question: Number of people who got it right: TBA; Number of people who are out: TBA; Number of people who passed: TBA; Prize Pot: TBA; Number of people who left with $1,000: TBA; 30% question: Number of people who got it right: TBA; Number of people who are out: TBA; Number of people who passed: TBA; Prize Pot: TBA; Number of people who left with $1,000: TBA; 25% question: Number of people who got it right: TBA; Number of people who are out: TBA; Number of people who passed: TBA; Prize Pot: TBA; Number of people who left with $1,000: TBA; 20% question: Number of people who got it right: TBA; Number of people who are out: TBA; Number of people who passed: TBA; Prize Pot: TBA; Number of people who left with $1,000: TBA; 15% question: Number of people who got it right: TBA; Number of people who are out: TBA; Number of people who passed: TBA; Prize Pot: TBA; Number of people who left with $1,000: TBA; 10% question: Number of people who got it right: TBA; Number of people who are out: TBA; Number of people who passed: TBA; Prize Pot: TBA; Number of people who left with $1,000: TBA; 5% question: Number of people who got it right: TBA; Number of people who are out: TBA; Number of people who passed: TBA; Prize Pot: TBA; Number of people who left with $1,000: TBA; Names of the remaining contestants: TBA; 1% question: Contestant who won: TBA; Contestant who lost: TBA; Contestant who left: TBA
32	4	"Episode 4"	10 May 2026	902,000
Episode 4 Results: 90% Question: Number of people who got it right: TBA; Number of people who are out: TBA; Number of people who passed: TBA; Prize Pot: TBA; Number of people who left with $1,000: TBA; 80% question: Number of people who got it right: TBA; Number of people who are out: TBA; Number of people who passed: TBA; Prize Pot: TBA; Number of people who left with $1,000: TBA; 70% question: Number of people who got it right: TBA; Number of people who are out: TBA; Number of people who passed: TBA; Prize Pot: TBA; Number of people who left with $1,000: TBA; 60% question: Number of people who got it right: TBA; Number of people who are out: TBA; Number of people who passed: TBA; Prize Pot: TBA; Number of people who left with $1,000: TBA; 50% question: Number of people who got it right: TBA; Number of people who are out: TBA; Number of people who passed: TBA; Prize Pot: TBA; Number of people who left with $1,000: TBA; 45% question: Number of people who got it right: TBA; Number of people who are out: TBA; Number of people who passed: TBA; Prize Pot: TBA; Number of people who left with $1,000: TBA; 40% question: Number of people who got it right: TBA; Number of people who are out: TBA; Number of people who passed: TBA; Prize Pot: TBA; Number of people who left with $1,000: TBA; 35% question: Number of people who got it right: TBA; Number of people who are out: TBA; Number of people who passed: TBA; Prize Pot: TBA; Number of people who left with $1,000: TBA; 30% question: Number of people who got it right: TBA; Number of people who are out: TBA; Number of people who passed: TBA; Prize Pot: TBA; Number of people who left with $1,000: TBA; 25% question: Number of people who got it right: TBA; Number of people who are out: TBA; Number of people who passed: TBA; Prize Pot: TBA; Number of people who left with $1,000: TBA; 20% question: Number of people who got it right: TBA; Number of people who are out: TBA; Number of people who passed: TBA; Prize Pot: TBA; Number of people who left with $1,000: TBA; 15% question: Number of people who got it right: TBA; Number of people who are out: TBA; Number of people who passed: TBA; Prize Pot: TBA; Number of people who left with $1,000: TBA; 10% question: Number of people who got it right: TBA; Number of people who are out: TBA; Number of people who passed: TBA; Prize Pot: TBA; Number of people who left with $1,000: TBA; 5% question: Number of people who got it right: TBA; Number of people who are out: TBA; Number of people who passed: TBA; Prize Pot: TBA; Number of people who left with $1,000: TBA; Names of the remaining contestants: TBA; 1% question: Contestant who won: TBA; Contestant who lost: TBA; Contestant who left: TBA
33	5	"Episode 5"	17 May 2026	840,000
Episode 5 Results: 90% Question: Number of people who got it right: TBA; Number of people who are out: TBA; Number of people who passed: TBA; Prize Pot: TBA; Number of people who left with $1,000: TBA; 80% question: Number of people who got it right: TBA; Number of people who are out: TBA; Number of people who passed: TBA; Prize Pot: TBA; Number of people who left with $1,000: TBA; 70% question: Number of people who got it right: TBA; Number of people who are out: TBA; Number of people who passed: TBA; Prize Pot: TBA; Number of people who left with $1,000: TBA; 60% question: Number of people who got it right: TBA; Number of people who are out: TBA; Number of people who passed: TBA; Prize Pot: TBA; Number of people who left with $1,000: TBA; 50% question: Number of people who got it right: TBA; Number of people who are out: TBA; Number of people who passed: TBA; Prize Pot: TBA; Number of people who left with $1,000: TBA; 45% question: Number of people who got it right: TBA; Number of people who are out: TBA; Number of people who passed: TBA; Prize Pot: TBA; Number of people who left with $1,000: TBA; 40% question: Number of people who got it right: TBA; Number of people who are out: TBA; Number of people who passed: TBA; Prize Pot: TBA; Number of people who left with $1,000: TBA; 35% question: Number of people who got it right: TBA; Number of people who are out: TBA; Number of people who passed: TBA; Prize Pot: TBA; Number of people who left with $1,000: TBA; 30% question: Number of people who got it right: TBA; Number of people who are out: TBA; Number of people who passed: TBA; Prize Pot: TBA; Number of people who left with $1,000: TBA; 25% question: Number of people who got it right: TBA; Number of people who are out: TBA; Number of people who passed: TBA; Prize Pot: TBA; Number of people who left with $1,000: TBA; 20% question: Number of people who got it right: TBA; Number of people who are out: TBA; Number of people who passed: TBA; Prize Pot: TBA; Number of people who left with $1,000: TBA; 15% question: Number of people who got it right: TBA; Number of people who are out: TBA; Number of people who passed: TBA; Prize Pot: TBA; Number of people who left with $1,000: TBA; 10% question: Number of people who got it right: TBA; Number of people who are out: TBA; Number of people who passed: TBA; Prize Pot: TBA; Number of people who left with $1,000: TBA; 5% question: Number of people who got it right: TBA; Number of people who are out: TBA; Number of people who passed: TBA; Prize Pot: TBA; Number of people who left with $1,000: TBA; Names of the remaining contestants: TBA; 1% question: Contestant who won: TBA; Contestant who lost: TBA; Contestant who left: TBA
34	6	"Episode 6"	24 May 2026	1,032,000
Episode 6 Results: 90% Question: Number of people who got it right: TBA; Number of people who are out: TBA; Number of people who passed: TBA; Prize Pot: TBA; Number of people who left with $1,000: TBA; 80% question: Number of people who got it right: TBA; Number of people who are out: TBA; Number of people who passed: TBA; Prize Pot: TBA; Number of people who left with $1,000: TBA; 70% question: Number of people who got it right: TBA; Number of people who are out: TBA; Number of people who passed: TBA; Prize Pot: TBA; Number of people who left with $1,000: TBA; 60% question: Number of people who got it right: TBA; Number of people who are out: TBA; Number of people who passed: TBA; Prize Pot: TBA; Number of people who left with $1,000: TBA; 50% question: Number of people who got it right: TBA; Number of people who are out: TBA; Number of people who passed: TBA; Prize Pot: TBA; Number of people who left with $1,000: TBA; 45% question: Number of people who got it right: TBA; Number of people who are out: TBA; Number of people who passed: TBA; Prize Pot: TBA; Number of people who left with $1,000: TBA; 40% question: Number of people who got it right: TBA; Number of people who are out: TBA; Number of people who passed: TBA; Prize Pot: TBA; Number of people who left with $1,000: TBA; 35% question: Number of people who got it right: TBA; Number of people who are out: TBA; Number of people who passed: TBA; Prize Pot: TBA; Number of people who left with $1,000: TBA; 30% question: Number of people who got it right: TBA; Number of people who are out: TBA; Number of people who passed: TBA; Prize Pot: TBA; Number of people who left with $1,000: TBA; 25% question: Number of people who got it right: TBA; Number of people who are out: TBA; Number of people who passed: TBA; Prize Pot: TBA; Number of people who left with $1,000: TBA; 20% question: Number of people who got it right: TBA; Number of people who are out: TBA; Number of people who passed: TBA; Prize Pot: TBA; Number of people who left with $1,000: TBA; 15% question: Number of people who got it right: TBA; Number of people who are out: TBA; Number of people who passed: TBA; Prize Pot: TBA; Number of people who left with $1,000: TBA; 10% question: Number of people who got it right: TBA; Number of people who are out: TBA; Number of people who passed: TBA; Prize Pot: TBA; Number of people who left with $1,000: TBA; 5% question: Number of people who got it right: TBA; Number of people who are out: TBA; Number of people who passed: TBA; Prize Pot: TBA; Number of people who left with $1,000: TBA; Names of the remaining contestants: TBA; 1% question: Contestant who won: TBA; Contestant who lost: TBA; Contestant who left: TBA
