= I Will Cure You =

Studio album by Vic Reeves
- Released: September 1991
- Length: 44:40
- Label: Island
- Producers: Steve Beresford; Philip Oakey; Andy Metcalfe; The Grid

Professional ratings
Review scores
Source	Rating
AllMusic	3/5 stars

I Will Cure You is the only album by English comedian Vic Reeves. It was released in 1991 by Island Records, produced by Steve Beresford, Andy Metcalfe and Philip Oakey and re-released in 1999 by Universal Music's Spectrum label. The album peaked at number 16 on the UK Albums Chart and features the number-one single "Dizzy", which was a collaboration with The Wonder Stuff.

== Content ==
The album includes a mixture of covers and original songs in a variety of musical styles, many of which were originally introduced on Reeves' debut Channel 4 comedy show Vic Reeves Big Night Out. Reeves' comedy partner Bob Mortimer sings alongside him on "Summer of '75", with Jonathan Ross providing whistling on "I Remember Punk Rock". Reeves has said that he did not want to make a novelty or comedy album but something more serious, and that for him being a singer is secondary as his comedy will always come first.

The sleeve and insert of the album features artwork and text created and written by Reeves. The sleeve notes also contain reproductions of three photographs with the legend "Where are Vic's boots?". Along with accompanying Ordnance Survey grid references they apparently pointed to three pairs of Chelsea boots that had been hidden by Reeves and Mortimer during an extended road trip around the UK. The grid references point to locations in Glen Etive in the Scottish Highlands, the Lake District in Cumbria and the Wash in East Anglia. One pair of boots, containing an original Polaroid photograph of Reeves with the boots, was located in Glen Etive by two Scottish fans.

== Singles ==
Three singles were released from the album: "Born Free", "Dizzy" and "Abide with Me", with various bonus tracks on each. The three singles were released on cassette, CD and 7", 10" and 12" records, with "Born Free" also being released as a picture disc.

"Born Free" was the first single to be released from the album, billed as 'Vic Reeves and the Roman Numerals' and reached number six on the UK Singles Chart. It is a cover of the Matt Monro song written by John Barry, which Reeves directly mentions in the song via a spoken-word section in the middle of the track. Although there are no musician credits on the sleeve, Reeves claims the track was created by members of Swing Out Sister and he just turned up for a few hours to do the vocal. The single's bonus track was a reworking of "Oh! Mr Songwriter", an original song by Reeves and Steve McGuire, with which Reeves ended each episode of Vic Reeves Big Night Out.

The second single to be released was "Dizzy", a collaboration with the Wonder Stuff which reached number one on the UK Singles Chart and remained there for two weeks. Mark E. Smith claimed Reeves had previously asked him if he and his band the Fall would do the collaboration, offering a £30,000 payment. Smith was up for it, but the rest of the band were unsure, with guitarist Craig Scanlon declining. As the song is a cover, neither Reeves nor the Wonder Stuff received any publishing royalties.

The final track to be released as a single was "Abide with Me", a dance reworking of a Christian hymn, produced by The Grid. It was the least successful of the album's singles, reaching number 47 on the UK Singles Chart. The single's bonus track was a cover of "Black Night" by Deep Purple, produced by Philip Oakey of the Human League. Oakey went on to appear in Reeves and Mortimer's television pilot The Weekenders. The sleeve of the single features an oil self-portrait by Reeves entitled "Bishop", which was later exhibited at the Britart Gallery, London.

== Music videos ==
The music video for "Born Free" shows Reeves singing on stage with his name in lights. Two female singers provide backing vocals and dance behind him throughout. During the video, various dogs jump onto the stage and by the end, the stage is littered with them. Reeves is also seen riding a motorbike in front of a green screen video. This is the only video which does not feature Bob Mortimer. During Reeves' performance of "Born Free" on Top of the Pops, he is seen turning the pages of a flip chart which contains various images of birds.

"Dizzy"'s music video shows Reeves trying unsuccessfully to get into the building where he and the Wonder Stuff will be performing. He ends up breaking in via the roof and falls onto the stage where he immediately begins to sing. The stage is stacked with a number of washing machines, one of which Reeves opens. The Top of the Pops performance of "Dizzy" also featured washing machines, with Reeves opening many machine doors in an attempt to find a camera inside one which he was meant to sing into, but it had been removed without his knowledge. Bob Mortimer appears in the background of the music video with Wonder Stuff frontman Miles Hunt, playing a tambourine and singing backing vocals. The music video was directed by Tony Van Den Ende and produced by Cathy Hood.

The music video for "Abide With Me" shows a muddy Reeves riding a horse around a farmyard where Bob Mortimer appears to be working. Reeves remains on horseback for the entirety of the video and also appears to perform several trick riding feats (performed by a stunt double). At the end of the video, the animals in the farmyard have a disco and Reeves rides the horse into the distance, stopping to rear in silhouette in front of the moon. The video was directed by Peter Christopherson, who allowed Reeves to choose what he'd like to do in the video. Reeves requested "a lectern, and a horse. I intend to ride a horse."

Four Golden Memories, a VHS containing the music videos to I Will Cure You's three singles, was released by Island Records in 1991. It also contains a live performance of "Meals on Wheels" and "Dizzy", as part of Vic Reeves Big Night Out On Tour, the latter of which features the Wonder Stuff.

== Track listing ==
No.	Title	Writer(s)	Length
1.	"Big Night Out" (theme)	Vic Reeves; Steve McGuire	0:34
2.	"Dizzy" (featuring the Wonder Stuff)	Freddy Weller; Tommy Roe	3:17
3.	"I Remember Punk Rock"	Reeves	3:08
4.	"Black Night"	Ian Gillan; Jon Lord; Ritchie Blackmore; Ian Paice; Roger Glover	4:03
5.	"Meals on Wheels"	Reeves	2:45
6.	"Oh! Mr Songwriter"	Reeves; McGuire	4:10
7.	"Born Free"	Don Black; John Barry	4:57
8.	"Sing Hi! The New Romantic"	Reeves; Steve Beresford	2:53
9.	"Empty Kennel"	Reeves	2:34
10.	"Summer of '75"	Reeves	3:53
11.	"Oh! Mr Hairdresser"	Reeves; McGuire	3:47
12.	"Abide with Me"	Traditional	5:17

== Certifications ==
Certifications for I Will Cure You
Region	Certification	Certified units/sales
United Kingdom (BPI)	Silver	60,000^{^}
^{^} Shipments figures based on certification alone.

== See also ==
- Randall & Hopkirk (Deceased) – theme single to the TV series features a cover of "Ain't That a Kick in the Head?" by Reeves
- "I'm a Believer" – Reeves and Mortimer cover with EMF
- Twentieth-Century Blues: The Songs of Noël Coward – features Reeves
- Ruby Trax – The NME's Roaring Forty – features Reeves
