= Channel X =

UK comedy and entertainment company

- Founded: 1987
- Founder: Jonathan Ross; Alan Marke
- Headquarters: United Kingdom
- Subsidiaries: Channel X North; Channel X Hopscotch
- Website: www.channelx.co.uk

Channel X Productions is a UK comedy and entertainment company with a 22–year history of producing programmes for all of the major broadcasters. The company specialises in scripted broken and narrative comedy, comedy-entertainment formats and game shows.

The company was formed in 1987 by Jonathan Ross and Alan Marke, and the former made his television presenting début as a stand-in presenter for Channel X programme The Last Resort.

Channel X's Manchester based subsidiary, Channel X North won its first commissions in 2009, netting deals at the BBC and Channel 4. In 2020, a new subsidiary was launched named Channel X Hopscotch, in partnership with Hopscotch Films to produce comedy and drama set and made in Scotland.

== Selected shows ==
- The Last Resort with Jonathan Ross
- Saturday Zoo with Jonathan Ross
- Vic Reeves Big Night Out
- Sean's Show
- Shooting Stars
- The Smell of Reeves and Mortimer
- Bang Bang, It's Reeves and Mortimer
- Catterick
- Popetown
- Blunder
- Modern Toss
- Snuff Box
- So Awkward
- Detectorists

=== Online ===
Channel X also produced an online comedy drama series called Chelsey OMG which aired on social networking website Bebo. By February 2009 the show had amassed almost 2,000,000 views.
