= Vic Reeves' House Arrest =

British radio comedy series (2007)

- Genre: Comedy
- Running time: 30 minutes
- Country of origin: United Kingdom
- Language: English
- Home station: BBC Radio 2
- Starring: Vic Reeves; Bob Mortimer; Nancy Sorrell; Noel Fielding
- Created by: Vic Reeves
- Written by: Vic Reeves
- Produced by: Paul Russell (Open Mike Productions)
- Narrated by: Vic Reeves
- Original release: 16 November – 22 December 2007
- No. of series: 1
- No. of episodes: 6
- Audio format: Stereophonic sound
- Website: BBC website

Vic Reeves' House Arrest is a weekly radio comedy series written by and starring Vic Reeves. It was produced by Open Mike Productions and broadcast on BBC Radio 2 It co-starred Reeves' wife Nancy Sorrell, his comedy partner Bob Mortimer, and The Mighty Boosh star, Noel Fielding. It was first broadcast in 2007 in the 1 pm slot on Saturday afternoons.

== Show format and characters ==
The show's premise was that Reeves had been put under house arrest for "a crime he didn't commit", each show beginning with him informing listeners of a different ludicrous crime. Each episode consisted of the various events that take place in and around his house on a particular day. Regular occurrences included Reeves waking up the street and inadvertently firing objects into the local vicar's vestry in the process, reading bizarre small ads in the newspaper, watching a television programme, reading his book Nothing but the Sleuth, struggling to stop his records from jumping, and visiting the animal menagerie in his shed. He was also visited by a variety of characters such as Carl – a talkative housecall-making hairdresser (Bob Mortimer), a local vagrant just out of jail and looking for odd jobs (Noel Fielding), and his parole officer (Nancy Sorrell).

In addition to these new characters, the show also featured some characters from previous Vic and Bob series' including "Kinky" John Fowler (Bang Bang, It's Reeves and Mortimer / Catterick) and Davey Stott (Vic Reeves Big Night Out / Bang Bang, It's Reeves and Mortimer). The programme also featured Reeves practising his "club singer"-style vocals (Shooting Stars) in the bath, with the intention of getting on The X Factor.

== Episode list ==
| Episode | First broadcast |
|---|---|
| 1 | 16 November 2007 |
| 2 | 24 November 2007 |
| 3 | 1 December 2007 |
| 4 | 8 December 2007 |
| 5 | 15 December 2007 |
| 6 | 22 December 2007 |

== Cast and characters ==
- Vic Reeves

Himself
The vicar
The fat lad next door
Father in TV show My Dad, the Moron
Detective Inspector John "Deacon" Fowler
Man in TV show Brief Encounters of the Third Kind
Land of Sport TV show reporter, plus interviewees David Beckham, Frank Monroe and Kevin Welsh

- Nancy Sorrell

PC Mavis (Vic's parole officer)
Mother in TV show My Dad, the Moron
Woman in TV show Brief Encounters of the Third Kind
Kelly Holmes in Land of Sport TV show

- Bob Mortimer

Carl the hairdresser
Davey Stott, presenting Davey Stott's Cooking Pot TV show

- Noel Fielding

Derek Randolph St. Clair D'beauvois of St James', a vagrant looking for odd jobs

- Peter Serafinowicz

Terry Wogan
