= The Weekenders (TV pilot) =

British television sitcom pilot episode

- Title caption
- Also known as: The Meat Festival
- Genre: Surreal sitcom
- Written by: Vic Reeves; Bob Mortimer
- Directed by: Sandy Johnson
- Starring: Vic Reeves; Bob Mortimer; John Thomson; Simon Day; Paul Whitehouse; Phil Oakey
- Country of origin: United Kingdom
- Original language: English

Production
- Executive producer: David Liddiment
- Producer: Mark Robson
- Running time: 24 minutes 39 seconds
- Production company: Granada Television

Original release
- Network: Channel 4
- Release: 17 June 1992

Related
- The Smell of Reeves and Mortimer; Catterick

The Weekenders is a one-off comic television pilot starring Vic Reeves and Bob Mortimer, produced by Granada Television for Channel 4. Broadcast on Wednesday 17 June 1992 as part of a series of pilots entitled Bunch of Five, it was a surreal sitcom in which two friends, Jim and Bob, visit a meat festival taking place in an open field. They are then chased by aliens who want the meat they have bought to feed their queen.

== Plot ==
In the sole episode The Meat Festival, Bob visits his friend Jim, who has been going through some hard times. For example, his father has been practising with his ouija board, and brought back his uncle and aunt as a pair of geese. They go down to the local pub (The Farting Dashboard) and discover in the newspaper that there is a meat festival taking place (at St. Prontaprint-in-Arndale). They decide to visit the festival, which consists of two tables in an open field. Jim buys a "speciality meat product" from Phil Oakey. However, some other people try to buy the meat off him. Jim and Bob refuse, but the men keep trying to take the meat away from him.

When Jim goes to the pub toilets, he and Bob discover that the men are in fact alien beings with Geordie accents, who claim they need the meat to feed their queen and keep their race alive. Jim and Bob decide to give them the meat, but the police come and attempt to arrest the aliens for stealing other speciality meat products. Jim, Bob and the aliens fight off the police, run away and are led to a garden shed which is in fact the aliens' space ship. Jim and Bob realise that they have forgotten the meat. The police then arrive, but instead of arresting the aliens, give the meat that they left behind. The aliens take the meat and give Jim and Bob a special wish. Jim asks for his uncle and aunt to return to their former selves. The aliens take the meat and leave Earth. When Jim and Bob arrive home, Jim discovers the aliens made his wish come true; his uncle and aunt have returned to their former selves - as foxes.

== Production ==
The Weekenders was the first television programme created by Reeves and Mortimer following the end of the hugely popular series Vic Reeves Big Night Out. Reeves co-wrote the show with Mortimer under his real name, Jim Moir, which is also the name given to his character. The show was produced as a pilot for Channel 4's Bunch of Five season – the network's own version of the BBC's Comedy Playhouse, in which new sitcom ideas were tried out. Out of the five pilots that were broadcast, only one – a Frank Skinner sitcom entitled Blue Heaven - was made into a full series.

The show co-starred several comedians and actors who were unknown at the time, but had worked with Reeves and Mortimer previously and would go on to become famous. These included John Thomson (credited as "John Patrick-Thompson"), Simon Day (credited as "Tommy Cockles") and Paul Whitehouse. The show also featured a guest appearance from Phil Oakey, the frontman for The Human League (credited as "Philip Oakey").

== Reception ==
Channel 4 have claimed to have liked The Weekenders and said they would have been willing to let Reeves and Mortimer do a full series, in exchange for a third series of Vic Reeves Big Night Out. However, Reeves and Mortimer were not willing to do another series of Vic Reeves Big Night Out, having performed the show on stage and on television for five years. As neither side was willing to compromise, a series was never commissioned. This rejection is considered to be one of the main factors for Reeves and Mortimer moving to the BBC, where they went on to create The Smell of Reeves and Mortimer in 1993, followed by Shooting Stars and Bang Bang, It's Reeves and Mortimer.

The pilot is seen by fans as an experimental move for Reeves and Mortimer, as it allowed them to perform in a new format - though the duo would not write and perform in another sitcom until Catterick in 2004.

As part of Channel 4's Funny Fortnight season, The Weekenders was repeated on Thursday 16 August 2012, preceded by a specially recorded introduction by Reeves and Mortimer.

== Locations ==
Several scenes were filmed around Greater Manchester, namely in areas such as the Northern Quarter, Trafford, Urmston, and Wythenshawe, whilst The Pack Horse in Bolton is used as the hotel called The Glove.
