= 29 Minutes of Fame =

- 29 Minutes of Fame intertitle
- Genre: Comedy
- Created by: Mark Leveson; Dan Patterson
- Directed by: Geraldine Dowd
- Presented by: Bob Mortimer
- Starring: Jo Brand; Alistair McGowan; Sean Lock
- Theme music composer: Philip Pope
- Country of origin: United Kingdom
- Original language: English
- No. of series: 1
- No. of episodes: 6

Production
- Running time: 29 minutes

Original release
- Network: BBC One
- Release: 21 January – 25 February 2005

29 Minutes of Fame is a British satirical celebrity quiz series which aired on BBC One on Fridays in early 2005. The show was presented by comedian Bob Mortimer. The show's two team captains were Jo Brand and Alistair McGowan, they were also joined by a regular panelist Sean Lock.

== Format ==
The format of the show was similar to another BBC quiz program, Have I Got News for You, but without the politics. Each week three celebrities joined the regular cast on the two panels. The questions were based around comical elements of other celebrity figures of the time.

== Guests ==
=== Episode 1 ===
(21 January 2005)

- Amanda Donohoe
- Stephen Fry
- Jason Wood

=== Episode 2 ===
(28 January 2005)

- Graeme Garden
- Lee Mack
- Jason Wood

=== Episode 3 ===
(4 February 2005)

- Tony Hawks
- Debbie McGee
- Ricky Tomlinson

=== Episode 4 ===
(11 February 2005)

- Jennie Bond
- Tony Hawks
- Ben Miller

=== Episode 5 ===
(18 February 2005)

- Tony Livesey
- Matt Lucas
- Arabella Weir

=== Episode 6 ===
(25 February 2005)

- Eddie Izzard
- Carol Smillie
- Ricky Tomlinson
