= Patrick Allen (actor) =

British actor (1927– 2006)

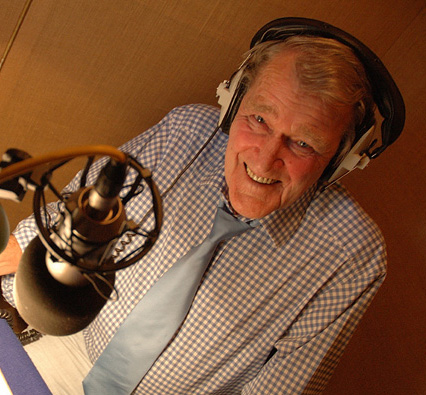
- Allen in 2005
- Born: John Keith Patrick Allen; 17 March 1927; Nyasaland (now Malawi)
- Died: 28 July 2006 (aged 79); London, England
- Occupation: Actor
- Years active: 1952–2005
- Spouse: Sarah Lawson (m. 1960)
- Children: 2

John Keith Patrick Allen (17 March 1927 – 28 July 2006) was a British actor.

== Life and career ==
Allen was born in Nyasaland (now Malawi), where his father was a tobacco farmer. After his parents returned to Britain, he was evacuated to Canada during the Second World War, where he remained to finish his education, studying at McGill University in Montreal. Before returning to Britain, he gained experience as a local radio broadcaster and appeared on television in plays and documentaries.

Returning to the UK in 1953, Allen made his film debut in Alfred Hitchcock's Dial M for Murder (1954). He subsequently appeared in character roles in many films, including Captain Clegg, The Wild Geese, The Sea Wolves, Puppet on a Chain, and Who Dares Wins. He was also the lead actor in the Associated-Rediffusion adventure series Crane (1963–65) and in the BBC1 series Brett (1971). Allen played Moriarty's deputy Colonel Sebastian Moran in The Adventures of Sherlock Holmes and The Return of Sherlock Holmes.

Allen made regular appearances during the 1960s and early 1970s in the ABC Television television series The Avengers, and in numerous ITC television series including The Power Game, The Baron, The Champions, and Gideon's Way, although he never had a recurring role in any of these series.

He was featured in one episode of the Tempean Films television series The Saint ("The Man Who Could Not Die"), broadcast in the UK in July 1965., and also appeared in 1971 in the "Timelash" episode of the Century 21 Productions television series UFO.

Allen also worked with the Royal Shakespeare Company in a number of stage roles in the early 1960s (the As You Like It broadcast on television), along with many BBC productions, including appearing as Mr Gradgrind in a four-part television production of Dickens' Hard Times in 1977.

In 1967, Allen and his wife Sarah Lawson appeared together playing a married couple in the science fiction film, Night of the Big Heat. He and Lawson also played husband and wife in the BBC radio series, Stand By For West, based on the John Creasey novels about Scotland Yard Chief Inspector Roger West.

Allen's distinctive, authoritative voice was familiar across the United Kingdom, even amongst those who did not recognise him as an actor. He dubbed Leon Greene, who played Rex, in the 1968 Hammer film The Devil Rides Out.

Allen narrated the British Government's Protect and Survive series of public information films in the 1970s; some of his lines in that production were re-recorded and sampled into the single "Two Tribes" by the band Frankie Goes to Hollywood. He also appeared in and voiced numerous commercials for house builder Barratt Homes and car manufacturers Ford and British Leyland among many others. His voice-over work led him to start up his own business, running a successful recording studio for voice-over work.

Allen provided the narration (the voice of Captain Star) for the 1989 children's series TUGS. Allen remained uncredited for his work, which was revealed in an interview with the show's producer Robert D. Cardona.

Allen's voice was heard at the beginning of videocassettes distributed in the UK by Video Network in the 1980s, welcoming viewers and reading an anti-copying warning. He also narrated the first series of Blackadder, and appeared in the last episode, "The Black Seal", as Edmund's nemesis, Phillip of Burgundy – known to his enemies as "The Hawk".

Allen's voice became synonymous with British alternative comedy in the 1990's after his recurring role as the Announcer for shows written by and starring Vic Reeves and Bob Mortimer, including Vic Reeves Big Night Out, The Smell of Reeves and Mortimer and Bang, Bang, It's Reeves and Mortimer.

In 2005, Allen became the voice of the British television channel E4, providing voiceovers for many of its idents and promotions.

Allen was also the voice of the Christian O'Connell Breakfast Show on XFM, the late show on 103.2 Power FM, Hirsty's Daily Dose on Galaxy Yorkshire and briefly Virgin Radio.

== Personal life ==
Allen married actress Sarah Lawson in 1960; the couple had two sons.

== Death ==
Allen died on the morning of 28 July 2006, aged 79. He was survived by his wife (until her death on 18 August 2023) and their sons.

== Filmography ==
- Blackbeard the Pirate (1952) – Undetermined Role (uncredited)
- Battle Circus (1953) – British Officer (uncredited)
- World for Ransom (1954) – Soldier (uncredited)
- Dial M for Murder (1954) – Detective Pearson
- Confession (1955) – Corey
- Cross Channel (1955) – Hugo Platt
- King's Rhapsody (1955) – Richard's Companion in Theatre Box (uncredited)
- 1984 (1956) – Inner Party Official
- Wicked as They Come (1956) – Willie
- The Baby and the Battleship (1956) – Mate (uncredited)
- The Adventures of Aggie (1956–57)
- High Tide at Noon (1957) – Charles MacKenzie
- The Long Haul (1957) – Joe Easy
- The Mark of the Hawk (1957) – Gregory
- High Hell (1958) – Luke Fulgham
- The Man Who Wouldn't Talk (1958) – Jim Kennedy
- Dunkirk (1958) – Sergeant on Parade Ground
- Tread Softly Stranger (1958) – Paddy Ryan
- I Was Monty's Double (1958) – Col. Mathers
- Jet Storm (1959) – Mulliner
- Never Take Sweets from a Stranger (1960) – Peter Carter
- The Sinister Man (1961) – Dr. Nelson Pollard
- The Traitors (1962) – John Lane
- Captain Clegg (1962) – Captain Collier
- Flight from Singapore (1962) – John Scott
- The Big Job (1965) – Narrator (voice, uncredited)
- The Night of the Generals (1967) – Colonel Mannheim
- The Viking Queen (1967) – Narrator (voice, uncredited)
- Night of the Big Heat (1967) – Jeff Callum
- Oedipus the King (1968) – Chorus Leader (voice, uncredited)
- The Devil Rides Out (1968) – Rex Van Ryn (voice, uncredited)
- Carry On Up the Khyber (1968) – Narrator (voice, uncredited)
- The Body Stealers (1969) – Bob Megan
- The Assassination Bureau (1969) – Narrator (voice, uncredited)
- The File of the Golden Goose (1969) – Narrator (voice, uncredited)
- When Dinosaurs Ruled the Earth (1970) – Kingsor / Narrator
- Puppet on a Chain (1971) – Inspector Van Gelder
- Persecution (1974) aka Sheba, The Graveyard, The Terror of Sheba – Robert Masters
- The Wilby Conspiracy (1975) – District Commissioner
- The Eagle Has Landed (1976) – Narrator (voice, uncredited)
- The Domino Principle (1977) – Narrator (voice, uncredited)
- The Wild Geese (1978) – Rushton
- Force 10 from Navarone (1978) – Narrator (voice, uncredited)
- Caligula (1979) – Macro (voice, uncredited)
- The Sea Wolves (1980) – Colin MacKenzie
- Who Dares Wins (1982) – Police Commissioner
- Jack the Ripper (TV Mini-Series) (1988) – Opening Narrator (voice, uncredited)
- Tugs (1989) – Captain Star/Narrator (voice, uncredited)
- Bullet to Beijing (1995) – Col. Wilson
- RPM (1998) – Millionaire
- Dangerville (2003) – Unknown role (voice)
- Days That Shook the World (2004) – Sir John French
- The Magic Roundabout (2005) – Skeletons (voice, uncredited) (final Film Role.)
