= Bang, Bang, It's Reeves and Mortimer =

British TV comedy series (1999)

- Cover
- Genre: Comedy
- Directed by: Mark Mylod
- Starring: Vic Reeves; Bob Mortimer
- Country of origin: United Kingdom
- Original language: English
- No. of series: 1
- No. of episodes: 6

Production
- Producer: Alan Marke
- Running time: 30 minutes
- Production company: Channel X

Original release
- Network: BBC2
- Release: 1 January – 5 February 1999

Bang Bang, It's Reeves and Mortimer is a British comedy television series, the third by comedy double act Vic Reeves and Bob Mortimer and their second in a sketch show format. Directed by Mark Mylod and produced by Alan Marke, it first aired in 1999 on BBC2.

== Show format ==
While maintaining elements from The Smell of Reeves and Mortimer, Bang Bang... was very different in many ways. As with their previous sketch show, a song kicked off the proceedings, and once again the duo sat at their trademark desk. However, the desk was almost completely bare, (as opposed to their previous prop-covered ones), and had a transparent front through which the moving form of a naked man (in interviews, the duo explained that he was "a homunculus") could be seen. The studio set was different too, the huge R&M letters replaced with large representations of the pair behind warped glass.

There were also changes in their double-act dynamic. Vic's character was frequently unhinged and waved guns and large blunt objects around with relish, while Bob played a slightly baffled innocent most of the time. As usual, however, they tended to fall out easily, resulting in one of their trademark slapstick fights, which grew more absurd, violent and freeform as the series progressed. One memorable instance involved Vic's head becoming grotesquely disfigured after a spin in a tumble dryer. Bob then gleefully set about the hunchbacked, pathetic Vic with a baseball bat.

There were also a number of pre-recorded sketches. These would often feature Charlie Higson, Morwenna Banks, Matt Lucas and David Walliams in supporting or cameo roles. It was a firm favourite with Vic and Bob's cult following, but confused and unsettled many new fans who had joined them after viewing their more accessible game show spoof, Shooting Stars. The duo said that Bang Bang... was their "first real attempt at making something commercial". Vic and Bob have said they are very proud of the show, with Bob stating: "We have this hope that, if there's anyone left bothered about us in fifty years' time, [Bang Bang] will be the one they'll remember".

== Recurring sketches ==
=== Lunch-Hour Capers (The Car Door Blokes) ===
These odd slapstick sketches saw the duo driving around idyllic locations, accompanied by a semi-instrumental version of "Zabadak", only to park their car between two immovable objects (trees, other parked cars, a petrol pump etc.), resulting in a protracted bout of "very frustrating" door-opening attempts, after which the duo would have to resort to other methods. Usually, at some point the car's boot or windscreen wipers would fly off and explode nearby. In these sketches, someone was always killed in a strange way, ejecting an egg from their mouths to Babybird's "There's Something Going On" before vanishing. The duo have explained that the eggs symbolise "their souls". This recurring joke even extended to the desk, where Vic accidentally shot himself with a gun, disappeared and left an egg behind, which Bob then greedily ate. Bob has described the Lunch-Hour Capers as "the most surreal thing we’ve ever done."

=== Fun, Fun, Fun ===
Tom Fun, who had previously appeared in The Smell of Reeves and Mortimer, and his best friend Derek (revealed in the last sketch to be the former drummer of Roxy Music) were shown in these oddly touching sketches wandering around aimlessly at dawn, having been thrown out of their lodgings for generally unclear reasons involving Derek's behaviour (one example given being Derek's public attempt to eat an arctic roll "like a pelican might eat it"). Their quest to find something "fun" to do was very childlike and knew no bounds, from going down the drains, to prising up cobblestones or rooting around in a skip. In most of the sketches, Derek asks Tom "Is it Giro day?" to which he responds negatively. Each of these segments opened with the "fun fun fun" refrain from the song "Five Get Over Excited" by The Housemartins. In the last episode of the series, the pair are seen holding hands as the credits roll, walking along a beach at sunset to Roxy Music's "Oh Yeah!". Mortimer has described the pair as "lovers".

Tom Fun and Derek later appeared together (officially describing themselves as "partners" for the first time) in sketches as part of 2009 mockumentary Steve Coogan: The Inside Story. Abandoning their Giros, they appear to have found work as disenchanted make-up artists. Derek also briefly appeared in Catterick without Tom, but decidedly more manic and obsessed with feminine hygiene products.

=== The Club ===
The main event of Bang Bang was this spoof fly-on-the-wall docu-drama, which took us behind-the-scenes of Baron's Nightclub, the "4th best club in Hull." Paul Baron (Vic) was the dodgy proprietor who kept the premises' keys on impractically short "luxury chains" about his person. Vic and Bob have stated that despite visual similarities, Paul Baron was not modelled on famous nightclub owner Peter Stringfellow. Paul's previously long-lost brother Tony (Bob, with a bizarre Chinese accent) was in charge of the day-to-day running of the club, often expressing "serious reservations" about Paul's half-baked ideas. The club's compere was insane American Kinky John Fowler (Vic), whose "plucking peppercorns" routine was not one of Tony's favourites. After a disastrous "Erotic Night," and an even more calamitous "Talent Night" (which consisted of a man with a fox on his head and a man frightening ducks with a hydraulic machine), things took a turn for the better when boy band Mandate (managed by Kinky John) played a successful set, and Paul managed to secure the services of Les Dennis for one night only. At the end of the series, a jealous Kinky John got "shit-faced" and threatened everyone with a large gun. Luckily for Kinky John, Mandate may have hit the big time in the Vic and Bob universe, as Jeff Randall (Bob) is seen singing their song "Touching Heaven" (performed in Bang Bang) in the duo's remake of Randall & Hopkirk (Deceased).

Kinky John had previously appeared in one-off BBC2 special It's Ulrika, written for Ulrika Jonsson by Vic and Bob in 1997. In the sketch, which also featured David Walliams and Matt Lucas, Kinky John introduced Jonsson to the stage of a Vegas-style night club. In his autobiography, Walliams describes how Kinky John's character began to develop in lulls in recording. "He would wander over to the rest of us and open with 'I’ve got a great deal. Three hundred coconuts are coming into town tonight. Are you in?’ [...] What a joy to see the two funniest men in the world create something new, right in front of my eyes." After debuting as a main character in Bang Bang, Kinky John featured in Vic's 2002 BBC Radio 2 comedy series Vic Reeves' House Arrest as Detective Inspector John "Deacon" Fowler via an autobiography of his early life. He would return again as DI Fowler in the duo's 2004 sitcom Catterick along with the club's bouncers Carl and Chris. He also appeared in "Steve Coogan: The Inside Story" as John Fowler, Television Controller 1993-1993.

Vic has said he believes the club sketches to be the inspiration for other fly-on-the-wall style comedies that emerged after Bang Bang, particularly The Office.

=== The Stotts ===
Once again, the Stotts returned, developing their celebrity interviews, which always started with "a little explosion" to "warm things up". Damon Hill was asked "When you are in a motor race, do you have a map, or just follow everyone else?". Sinéad O'Connor was given a full-frontal view of what lurked within Davey's kilt, a truly baffled Paul McKenna was asked if peanuts were soluble, Caprice was told that Davey's long pointy shoes were offered to him by the King of Spain in retribution for him "attacking his wife with a fish slice," while Michael Winner was quizzed on whether a human could leave fingerprints on a parsnip. One recurring question that was asked, often by Donald (Bob), was whether the guest, after work or at the end of the day, had, "A nice relaxing poo." At the end of every interview, the pair would abandon the celebrity onstage leaving them alone to the sounds of the adagietto from Mahler's fifth symphony.

=== "Never Previously Considered Funny Enough To Broadcast..." ===
A recurring series of bizarre sketch scenarios, usually involving parodies of celebrities. They were always introduced by narrator Patrick Allen, who would conclude each narration with "What happened that day has never previously been considered funny enough to broadcast...until now!"
