= Mash and Peas =

British TV sketch show (1996-1997)

- Starring: Matt Lucas; David Walliams
- Country of origin: United Kingdom
- Original language: English

Production
- Running time: 25 Minutes

Original release
- Network: Paramount Comedy Channel / Channel 4
- Release: 1996 – 1997

Mash and Peas was a parodic sketch show written by and starring Matt Lucas and David Walliams. Their first television work together, it originally aired on Paramount Comedy 1 and Channel 4 between 1996 and 1997. The episodes were repeated before the channel's relaunch in 1999. The programme is made up of parodies of various television genres, introduced by the childish and incompetent Danny Mash (Lucas) and Gareth Peas (Walliams). Edgar Wright directed and long-standing collaborator Paul Putner appeared throughout.

== Episode guide ==
1. "Kids TV"

- Parodies of Play Away, Tony Hart, Jackanory and Why Don't You? specifically, each with a hidden agenda - such as oppressive Christianity or existential terror - or some surprising surrealism coming to the fore.

2. "American Sitcoms"

- Parodies of American sitcoms, both domestic ('A Puppet Lives In My House') and blue-collar ('My Cousin Is English'). A sketch filmed but dropped for reasons of taste was a parody of Diff'rent Strokes called 'I'm Black And My Dad's In The Klan!'

3. "Sex Talk"

- Simon Greenall acts as host for a parody of the type of supposedly dangerous late-night sexual discussion programs that were around in the early nineties, featuring early Rock Profile-style interviews with married couples.

4. "Prime Time ITV"

- Parodies of Gay Byrne's hosting of The Late Late Show, Michael Barrymore's hosting in general, Victoria Wood's comedy (despite her shows being on BBC) and two old women talk over Wish You Were Here...?.

5. "Late Night ITV"

- Parodies of contemporary presenter Gaz Top, Mariella Frostrup's video review show, television producer Mike Mansfield's music series, and Richard Littlejohn's journalistic nature.

6. "Boy Band Documentary"

- Spoof documentary on a dim, up and coming, manufactured Take That-style band. This episode led to the series Boyz Unlimited, although its provenance was the source of a legal dispute.

7. "British On The Box"

- A full episode parody of Garry Bushell and the type of television and bigotry he inhabits. His 'guests' Quentin Crisp and Cockney Soap Star.

8. "Strange Phenomenums"

- A take on the early 1990s mystery science-fiction sensation, parodying cheap shows that sprang up in the wake of The X-Files, including the likes of TV psychics and Michael Aspel's Strange but True?. It is unclear as to whether videotape of this edition still exists.

== Sitcoms Night ==
In addition to these, in 1997, four sketches, very similar in tone to the American sitcoms edition were produced for a Sitcoms Night, which was made in partnership between Paramount Comedy 1 and Channel 4.

The first was a remake of the ALF parody A Puppet Lives In My House. The only major difference being that Jessica Stevenson's role was now taken by Rebecca Front, who performed as if her character was heavily medicated.

The remaining sketches were My Gay Dads, in which one typical American teenage girl is beset with three loud homosexual fathers, a US remake of Only Fools and Horses entitled Only Jerks and Horses and a Seinfeld parody, I'm Bland (but my friends are krazy!). Also appearing in these sketches were Bob Mortimer, Reece Shearsmith, Steve Pemberton, Mark Gatiss, Anna Francolini and Simon Greenall.

== Promotion ==
Shortly before transmission, Lucas and Walliams appeared in-character to publicise the show on Dominik Diamond's Paramount chat show Night O'Plenty. The interview became infamous, as the pair angered Diamond by interrupting the show with heckling and singing childish songs, as well throwing darts at the presenters. Walliams' autobiography Camp David states that Diamond chased them out of the studio.

Later, the pair also appeared as Mash and Peas in a number of music videos by Fat Les made between 1998 and 2000, including the hit single "Vindaloo".

== Subsequently ==
Soon after this, Lucas and Walliams created Sir Bernard's Stately Homes, before achieving recognition with Play UK's Rock Profile and, subsequently, their most successful work, Little Britain.

The pair have since expressed regret at their spoof of Victoria Wood, saying in the commentary of the third series of Little Britain that it was "youthful arrogance".
