= Charlie Chuck =

British comedian

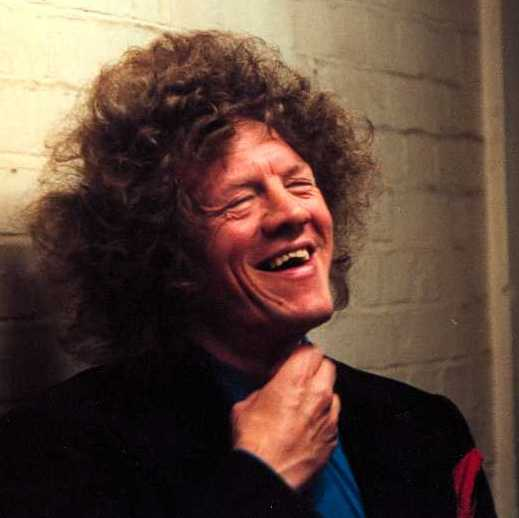
- Kear in 2002
- Born: 21 April 1946 (age 80); Burmantofts, Leeds, West Yorkshire, England
- Notable work: Uncle Peter in The Smell of Reeves and Mortimer

Comedy career
- Medium: Stand-up
- Website: www.charliechuck.co.uk/biography

Charlie Chuck (born 21 April 1946) is the stage name of British comedian David Kear.

== Biography ==
Kear was born on 21 April 1946, in Burmantofts, Leeds, West Yorkshire, England.

He began his career as a drummer with various bands in the late 1970s and early 1980s, including a stint with the Amazing Bavarian Stompers, with whom he performed on the children's television series Tiswas in 1981. In the late 1980s he turned to solo stand-up comedy as the surreally manic Charlie Chuck, and in 1990 he was talent-spotted by the comedian Malcolm Hardee, who arranged for him to appear on Jools Holland Happening (also known as The Happening), a Sky TV series produced by Noel Gay Television.

He later appeared on the Sky TV talent show Sky Star Search where he was spotted by disc jockey James Whale, who booked him for several editions of his late-night series James Whale Radio Show, a radio show that was simultaneously broadcast on television by Yorkshire Television on the ITV Network).

Between 1993 and 1995, he was a cast member of the BBC Two TV series The Smell of Reeves and Mortimer. He appeared performing his Charlie Chuck character act, but was always referred to as Uncle Peter. He also made regular guest appearances on chaotic British children's Saturday morning TV show Scratchy & Co., which aired on ITV from 1995 to 1998.

His long-running Charlie Chuck stage act often involved the destruction of a drum kit and was peppered by references to fantasy characters including One-Eyed Dog, Cakey Pig and a donkey. The words "Donkey!" and "Woof! Bark! Donkey!" shouted out more or less at random had been part of his Charlie Chuck act and became his Uncle Peter catchphrases on the Reeves & Mortimer TV shows. As a result of these TV appearances, Paul McCartney became a fan and invited Chuck to perform at one of his birthday parties.

In 2001 he appeared as his Charlie Chuck character in a series of TV adverts for Cadbury's Double Decker chocolate bars, with music by Lester Barnes.

In 2002 he appeared at the Edinburgh Fringe in the comedy show Charlie Chuck is Scrooge, very remotely based on the Charles Dickens character, and, that year, his company Charlie Chuck Productions also staged Scots comic Ian Watt's one-man Fringe show John Laurie, Frazer & I, which he directed as David Kear.

In 2004 he guest-starred in the Edinburgh Fringe show Nudge.

In 2006 he appeared as one of the acts in a five-hour memorial tribute show at London's Hackney Empire theatre in memory of his mentor, Malcolm Hardee.

In 2022 he appeared as Uncle Charlie in an episode of the BBC comedy Mandy.
