= Morwenna Banks =

Cornish actress

- Born: Tamsin Morwenna Banks; Redruth, Cornwall, England
- Education: Robinson College, Cambridge
- Occupations: Actress; comedian; writer; producer
- Spouse: David Baddiel (m. 2017)
- Children: 2

Tamsin Morwenna Banks is a Cornish actress. She appeared in the Channel 4 comedy sketch show Absolutely, and wrote, produced, and appeared in the British ensemble film The Announcement. She voices Mummy Pig, Madame Gazelle and Dr Hamster in the children's series Peppa Pig. She adapted Nick Hornby's novel Funny Girl for Sky Max (renamed Funny Woman for TV) and is a writer on Slow Horses for Apple TV+.

== Early life ==
Banks attended the private Truro High School for Girls and Robinson College, Cambridge, and was a member of the Cambridge Footlights from 1981 to 1983. She also acted with the Marlowe Society, such as in a brief comic cameo as the Widow in Ben Jonson's The Alchemist, alongside Tilda Swinton.

== Career ==
One of Banks' early major television roles was as part of the team on the comedy sketch show Absolutely, broadcast on Channel 4 between 1989 and 1993. Her other television appearances include the BBC series The Thick of It, Red Dwarf, Ruddy Hell! It's Harry and Paul and the Steve Coogan comedy Saxondale, in which she played receptionist Vicky. She also appeared as Anthea Stonem in the E4 Teen drama Skins and was a cast member on NBC's Saturday Night Live, for four episodes of the show's twentieth season. She appeared as Carmen Kenaway in the first two episodes of the ninth series of Shameless.

Her voice roles include Claire Feeble in Stressed Eric; Cleo Lion in Between the Lions; (Nick Jr UK) Mummy Pig and various other characters in Peppa Pig; the ship's computer in the BBC TV series Hyperdrive; Ping Pong in Rupert Bear, Follow the Magic... (Channel 5); and Guinevere in King Arthur's Disasters (CITV). Banks won Best Voice Performance at the 2014 British Animation Awards for providing the voice for Queen Marigold in Ben and Holly's Little Kingdom and a voice in Humf, and she has voiced the character Red in Dragon Quest VIII.

Banks wrote, produced, and appeared in the British ensemble film The Announcement in 2001. She also appeared in season one, episode 13 of Sabrina the Teenage Witch as a "rulebearer". In 2004, she played the central role of Tess in the series Catterick, with Vic Reeves and Bob Mortimer. She also appeared in their shows The Smell of Reeves and Mortimer, Bang, Bang, It's Reeves and Mortimer and Monkey Trousers.

Banks had also voiced Sophie in Crapston Villas, an adult animated sitcom soap opera, which was produced in the 1990s. Both Banks and the television programme's creator, Sarah Ann Kennedy, would later go on to voice characters in Peppa Pig.

=== Since 2009 ===
In 2009, Banks made a series of web videos for BBC Comedy called Celebrities STFU, each video featuring her in costume impersonating Lady Gaga, Noel Gallagher, Susan Boyle, Pixie Lott, Jools Holland, and Duffy.

On 19 October 2013, BBC Radio 4 broadcast Banks' play Goodbye about a woman diagnosed with breast cancer. The play is an account of the path from the first diagnosis to the death of Lizzie, played by Olivia Colman; it deals with her relationships with her family and best friend Jen, played by Natascha McElhone, and their reactions to Jen's illness and death. The cast included Darren Boyd, John Simm, Alison Steadman, Banks' Peppa Pig co-star Harley Bird, Banks' son Ezra, and singing by Banks' daughter Dolly. It was produced by Heather Larmour. Banks received the 2015 Tinniswood Award for the play. She subsequently wrote the play's 2015 film adaptation, titled Miss You Already.

From 2012 to 2018, she played Venus Traduces (a parody of Violet Trefusis) and other roles in the BBC Radio 4 sitcom Gloomsbury.

Banks' later voice work includes the roles of Betty and Sonia in the 2008 film version of Tales of the Riverbank; and a translator at the trial of Adolf Eichmann in The Eichmann Show.

In 2016, Banks co-wrote and starred in the comedy series Damned. She co-starred in and wrote (with Rebecca Front) Shush!, a sitcom set in a library broadcast on BBC Radio Four in 2017. In late 2019, she provided the voice of Mrs Brown in The Adventures of Paddington which began airing on Nick Jr. in early 2020.

She adapted Nick Hornby's novel Funny Girl for a 2023 series which airs on Sky as Funny Woman, and is a writer on Slow Horses for Apple TV+, which premiered in 2022.

== Awards ==
- 2014 British Animation Award for Best Voice Performance in Ben and Holly's Little Kingdom: Nanny's Magic Test
- 2015 Tinniswood Award for the radio play Goodbye

== Charity ==
Banks is a patron of the Drama Express charity.

== Personal life ==
Banks and fellow comedian David Baddiel have been together since 1998 and have been married since 2017. They have two children (Ezra Baddiel and Dolly Baddiel), both of whom acted in Banks' play Goodbye, and live in Hampstead.
