= The Smell of Reeves and Mortimer =

British TV sketch show (1993–1995)

- Cover of The Smell of Reeves and Mortimer
- Genre: Sketch comedy Slapstick; Surreal humour
- Created by: Vic Reeves & Bob Mortimer
- Starring: Vic Reeves; Bob Mortimer; Charlie Chuck; Patrick Allen; Steve Coogan; Mark Williams; Paul Whitehouse; Charlie Higson; Matt Lucas
- Country of origin: United Kingdom
- Original language: English
- No. of series: 2
- No. of episodes: 12

Production
- Producer: Channel X
- Running time: 30 minutes (series 2 on VHS and series 1–2 on DVD); 40 minutes (series 1 on VHS)
- Production company: Channel X

Original release
- Network: BBC
- Release: 21 September 1993 – 9 June 1995

Related
- Vic Reeves Big Night Out; Bang, Bang, It's Reeves and Mortimer

The Smell of Reeves and Mortimer is a BBC TV sketch show written by and starring double act Vic & Bob (Vic Reeves and Bob Mortimer). Its first series appeared in 1993 following the duo's move to the BBC after parting company with Channel 4. The show developed and expanded upon the absurd, anarchic comedy that the pair had first explored on Channel 4's Vic Reeves Big Night Out.

The major development from the previous series was that Mortimer now hosted the show alongside Reeves. As well as Mortimer getting his name in the title, he and Reeves sat together behind the large prop-strewn desk.

With virtually all of the Vic Reeves Big Night Out characters consigned to the past (only Greg Mitchell and the Stotts survived, with the Stotts appearing in the second series), a whole range of new characters appeared. The show also featured pre-recorded sketches, toast and a lavish studio set laden with columns and pillars, and in the centre the enormous letters R&M, from which the duo emerged at the start of each show.

The show would usually close with the song "Let's Have a Little Bit More", which saw the pair enthusing about various smells, from "Pol Pot's dungarees" to "Lulu's hairdos".

== Series 1 ==
The first series established the format of the show. Each programme began with an absurd introduction, narrated by Patrick Allen ("Austria, 1930, a young boy is challenged by his mischievous grandfather to attempt to throw a handbell at the local village idiot") before the studio set appeared and Allen introduced the duo ("Please welcome Libya's foremost air-conditioning engineers, Reeves & Mortimer"), after which the pair would sing a song before seating themselves at the desk to tell silly jokes, introduce their guests and endorse various Reeves & Mortimer products (such as the "Reeves & Mortimer Walk-Me-Home Cheddar" and "The Home Vibration Cowboy Unit").

A regular feature was a spoof of a then-current TV programme, such as Food & Drink, which saw host Chris Kelly (Bob), whose head was made of toasted cheese and a box of tea bags, and whose legs gradually became ridiculously long, afterwards boiling his head in a pot to "prepare a nice pot of tea", and Antiques Roadshow, where a termite mound containing the singer Prince was found inside a wardrobe. Perhaps the most bizarre was Noel's Addicts, an insane parody of a show hosted by Noel Edmonds in 1992 about people's hobbies.

The duo would frequently promise a celebrity guest such as Burt Reynolds, who turned out to be Vic in a strange outfit yelling about his book Coping With Stress, Cuban soap star Juan Nelly The Elephant (Vic), who kept intermittently turning into an electrical salesman, and Ian Crust, the Inventor of the Bag (Bob).

At the end of series 1, Bob played a huge practical joke on Vic, who lapsed into a coma. After a rousing final song, Bob unplugged his life-support machine.

=== Characters ===
The Bra Men – Pat Wright & Dave Arrowsmith

Two aggressive, donkey-jacket wearing men from the North East town of Hartlepool (Vic and Bob), who get extremely upset at people for "lookin' at my bra". They accuse anyone, be it the postman, a traffic warden or a milkman of "inspecting our charms" and also get very angry if someone inadvertently comments that they are "flat-chested". Also, despite telling the unwitting person they are dealing with where to stick the items they have to give them, they usually just take them anyway. These two were reportedly based on men with whom Reeves worked in a factory.

Le Corbussier et Papin

Vic and Bob as two extraordinarily flatulent Frenchmen, in a series of sketches that were filmed in the style of arty French comedies (titles included "L'homme, L'homme, L'femme (La fenêtre)"), accompanied only by whimsical music and the duo's deliberately dubbed on French-speaking voices (the French dialogue made virtually no sense.) They usually saw the pair riding along on their bicycles before encountering things which were deemed worthy of investigation (a kids' playground, where they got a roundabout spinning by the sheer volume of flatulence; a funfair where they attempted to fart-start a motorbike). The two would frequently shout "Papa" and "Nicole" in reference to Renault Clio's Papa and Nicole advertivising campaign.

Slade in Residence

This series of spoof sketches saw the '70s glam rock group Slade in their council house. Noddy (Vic), Jim (Paul Whitehouse) and Don (Mark Williams) were the three mischievous ones who were constantly arguing, wrecking the house and messing around with fireworks, much to the annoyance of the motherly Dave (Bob). Also featured famous Midlands musicians Ozzy Osbourne (Neil Morrissey), UB40, Roy Wood and Simon le Bon (last two Charlie Higson).

Mulligan & O'Hare

An eccentric folk duo, possibly spoofing the style of Foster & Allen, both named Dermot. Both wear tight polo necks. Mulligan (Vic) has breasts, presumably due to an incident with hormone replacement pills, while O'Hare (Bob) has a big beard. They sing songs such as "Frustrated By Weeds" and "My Rose Has Left Me", the latter about O'Hare's ex-wife Rose, a bald woman who went "to Kenya with the bloke from Allied Carpets." They have released groundbreaking albums, such as The Onion Ring, Moods, Coffee Break, Pancake Day and Tittybiscuits, and are well known for their instrumental cover versions of popular songs such as "When a Child is Born" and "Brimful of Asha". After several years away from the limelight, Mulligan and O'Hare appeared in episodes of Shooting Stars in 2010, and in 2014 they appeared on The Life of Rock with Brian Pern.

Otis Redding & Marvin Gaye

Vic and Bob played the soul music legends as the show's resident "agony aunts"; two tiny puppets who were on a TV in a cupboard, "sitting on the dock of the bay watching the ships coming in and going out again." Both spoke in a Teesside accent and in blackface. Bob's Marvin became increasingly bored and unhappy as the series progressed, complaining that they never saw any ships and wanting to go "down the Grapevine to have a drink" but Otis and Marvin were always more than willing to offer expert advice on such matters as "how to deal with Guy Fawking of the leg."

Barry White

"The Walrus of Love" Barry White was played by Vic in blackface as a huge puppet who had tiny little legs and spent his time seducing women with his smooth-talk, and cooking chopped liver. The women turned out to be a pineapple and a piece of copper pipe.

Jack Dent & Eric Potter

These two were always up-to-no-good in a series of '60s style public information film spoofs, set in the Country, the Factory and the Home. The narrator would frequently interrupt Vic and Bob in the middle of some nefarious activity ("Hey you?" "Who, us?" Yes, you... don't you know that the wallpapering of ploughs is prohibited under the country code?" "No." "Well, it is, for it can cause ploughwright distraction leading to seed misplacement, so stop it.") The narrator was revealed on each separate occasion to be a guitar-wielding spring onion, a crab, and a man called Mr Porridge, whom the duo shot. These sketches used the voice of Patrick Allen – the voice-over man for the series, and utilised his previous experience narrating public service films.

The Booze For t'Baby Man

A man who wandered around in a brown mac, and frequently asked Vic and Bob if they had "any booze for t'baby?" to which they would reply, "You can't give a baby BOOZE".

Whisky & Brandy Bolland

Two fey Scotsmen who appeared in the Antiques Roadshow spoof, investigating a wardrobe which contained "wee clothes, wee shoes... almost too wee." They eventually discovered a termite mound with Prince living inside it. They had their suspicions before finding him, because he had "only painted 18 inches above sea level." Brandy (Vic) then removed the diminutive singer and booted him through a basketball hoop. Whisky (Bob) remained convinced that Brandy was in fact Dr Nemesis.

Greg Mitchell & Corky

One of the only survivors of Vic Reeves Big Night Out was the puppet Greg Mitchell, the "gorgeous sandy coloured labrador" who was always wasting money on ludicrous things. His fey voice would give way to a guttural Cockney bellow as he would despairingly yell, "My wife's gonna kill me". His friend Corky was a dodgy mongrel cum gangster who stitched Greg up with a bungled bank robbery.

Derek & Chester

Two heavy-drinking men who appeared on the Food & Drink spoof reviewing various spirits before Derek (Vic) revealed that his girlfriend Maggie had left him. They then appeared in Antiques Roadshow wanting to get a bottle of Babycham appraised, before giving it to the Booze For t'Baby man.

Uncle Peter

Played by comedian Charlie Chuck, Uncle Peter was a big-haired, battered-suit wearing lunatic with a bizarre gait and an unnerving habit of shouting incomprehensibly ("DONKEY!") He was in a band, which featured himself and an unidentified electric organ player played by Trevor Peacock. The band saw Peter shout random nonsense before completely destroying his drumkit. Peter was always wary of being sent back "to t'dark place" by Vic and Bob.

== Series 2 ==
The second series appeared in 1995, and a few changes to the format of the first series had occurred. The unusual introductions followed by a song continued (an example was a history of cheese followed by an upbeat song investigating the link between cottage cheese and voodoo) and the same closing song (which originally appeared on the pilot for Vic Reeves Big Night Out), but while the set was essentially the same, the desk was different - it had a slick, red surface, a metal body and a fox stretched across its entire length.

While still offbeat and irreverent, the second series had a less absurd, more overtly slapstick atmosphere to it, with Vic increasingly the buffoon to Bob's disapproving figure. Any disagreement was usually the cue for the duo's now-trademark fights with increasingly large frying pans and hammers.

The finale to each show would usually see a despairing Bob attempting to entertain the audience, whether singing The Way We Were on skis or For All of Us from within a glass bottle, playing The British Countryside on the flute, or playing his enormous organ, which happened to contain a fully functioning pub. Vic would barge in and ruin everything for Bob before the usual, rousing "Let's Have A Little Bit More" song would close the proceedings.

Reeves & Mortimer products were no longer advertised by the duo themselves, but in the form of "commercials." Products this time included the coffee-table books Dogs in Their Hats and Cats in Bomber Jackets, Webster's Savoury Edible Tights and Papa's Nappies For Men.

Spoofs of then-current TV shows continued, including MasterChef spoof, with Vic as Loyd Grossman with a huge bulbous head floating around the studio to the sound of bells, and the contestants including Morwenna Banks as Joan Baptiste, who presented a faceplate in the form of Jesus Christ, with her own severed ears the speciality, Matt Lucas as the victorious Quentin Mint, who presented a human backside with a side salad, and Bob as the hapless Lucas Bon'chomme whose replica cake of a shoe ("Cake like a shoe, it's a shoe-cake") turned out to be a real shoe, as did his "cakey-phone."

=== Episodes ===
- Cheese (5 May 1995)
- Haircuts (12 May 1995)
- Toddlers (19 May 1995)
- Clothes (26 May 1995)
- Muscle Chemicals (2 June 1995)
- Flight 709 (9 June 1995)

=== Characters ===
Many of the characters from series 1 returned. Uncle Peter was as insane as ever, tormenting the duo with his tales of upgrading to "donkey" status in British Rail carriages, leaving his family heirlooms lying around on the desk and showing off his singing German owls.

The Booze For t'Baby man continued his quest to find some booze for his baby, which eventually brought him a bottle of Babycham, for which he was moderately thankful.

Otis and Marvin were no longer on the dock of the bay but in their own home, where a constantly closing cupboard door and Otis's wayward moustache kept causing problems. Brownface paint was not present.

Le Corbussier et Papin continued to fart their way through more farcical situations.

Slade went on a frequently disastrous camping holiday. First, Dave (Bob) got wrongly arrested for being a peeping tom, then Don's (Mark Williams) arse caught fire, and finally Noddy (Vic), Jim (Paul Whitehouse) and Dave were constantly attacked by bees and Don pretended to be a policeman.

Mulligan & O'Hare released two albums, Pancake Day (which earned them a South Bank Show profile, although presenter Melvyn Bragg appeared to be more interested in his bicycle) and Coffee Break.

The Bra Men, Pat Wright & Dave Arrowsmith, got more offended than ever when they appeared on Stars in Their Eyes, and Matthew Kelly (Bob) commented on how well supported they were. They also went to Swiss Toni's Used Cars to buy a car. Upon spotting a convertible, Swiss Toni's comments that "I can picture you... driving along in the summer with your top down" were taken very badly. Swiss Toni would later appear as a major character in The Fast Show.

Some new characters joined them:

Councillors Cox & Evans

Two corrupt, obese, wig-wearing officials for the Aldington On Sea district council. They would try and advertise dodgy products such as "Fun Bins" and "the Service Post" before a flaw in the design would inevitably be revealed, leading to a violent fight, Evans (Bob) accusing Cox (Vic) of being a "fat bastard".

Tom Fun

A perpetually optimistic children's entertainer, played by Vic, who invented cheese along with his friend Mr Grapefruit Drink. He appeared in a Country File spoof detailing his walk along the Eskdale Way and how much drink, "snouts" and snacks he would take with him. Tom Fun would enjoy much more exposure in Reeves & Mortimer's 1999 series, Bang Bang, It's Reeves and Mortimer.

Chris Bell

A scruffy, belligerent Cockney, played by Vic. He first appeared in the Noel's Addicts sketch in series 1 as a man who collected horse-drawn nuts. He later was a guest on Stars in Their Eyes as Rod Stewart, and presented "Chris Bell's Fishing Report" on the Country File spoof, irritating a man trying to fish in a lake by knocking his tackle into the lake and then commandeering the rod before getting shot.

The Stotts

Returning from Vic Reeves Big Night Out, Donald presented This Is Your Life to Davey, who "wrote Jingle Bells", had "recently had a Vesta Curry" and fought in the "Flalakand War" where he went on the task force and ate a number of biscuits. The pair then hosted "Chittle Chattle Chit," where they interviewed Sting, reducing him to hysterics with questions like "If you got an itchy bottom at night, would you rub it on your wife's chin, point your bottom out of the window to blow it off with the breeze, or pick at it with your finger?" This idea of interviewing a guest returned in Bang Bang, It's Reeves and Mortimer.

== Home release ==
The first series was released on VHS and included extended versions of the episodes, with approximately 7–10 minutes of new footage. The Smell of Reeves and Mortimer DVD, contains both series and was released by 2 Entertain/Cinema Club in 2006. This DVD release featured the standard BBC broadcast versions. The Series 2 DVD release contains the standard broadcast version with no added material.

A sketch from the first episode of series one, featuring Rebecca Front as Jilly Goolden inhaling gases, was cut from the original PG-rated VHS, possibly to prevent impressionable young viewers from learning an imitable technique. The scene was reinstated for the DVD release, with the episode rated 15 for "inhalant misuse", a higher certificate than other episodes.
