= Matt Lucas =

British actor and comedian (born 1974)

Matt Lucas OBE
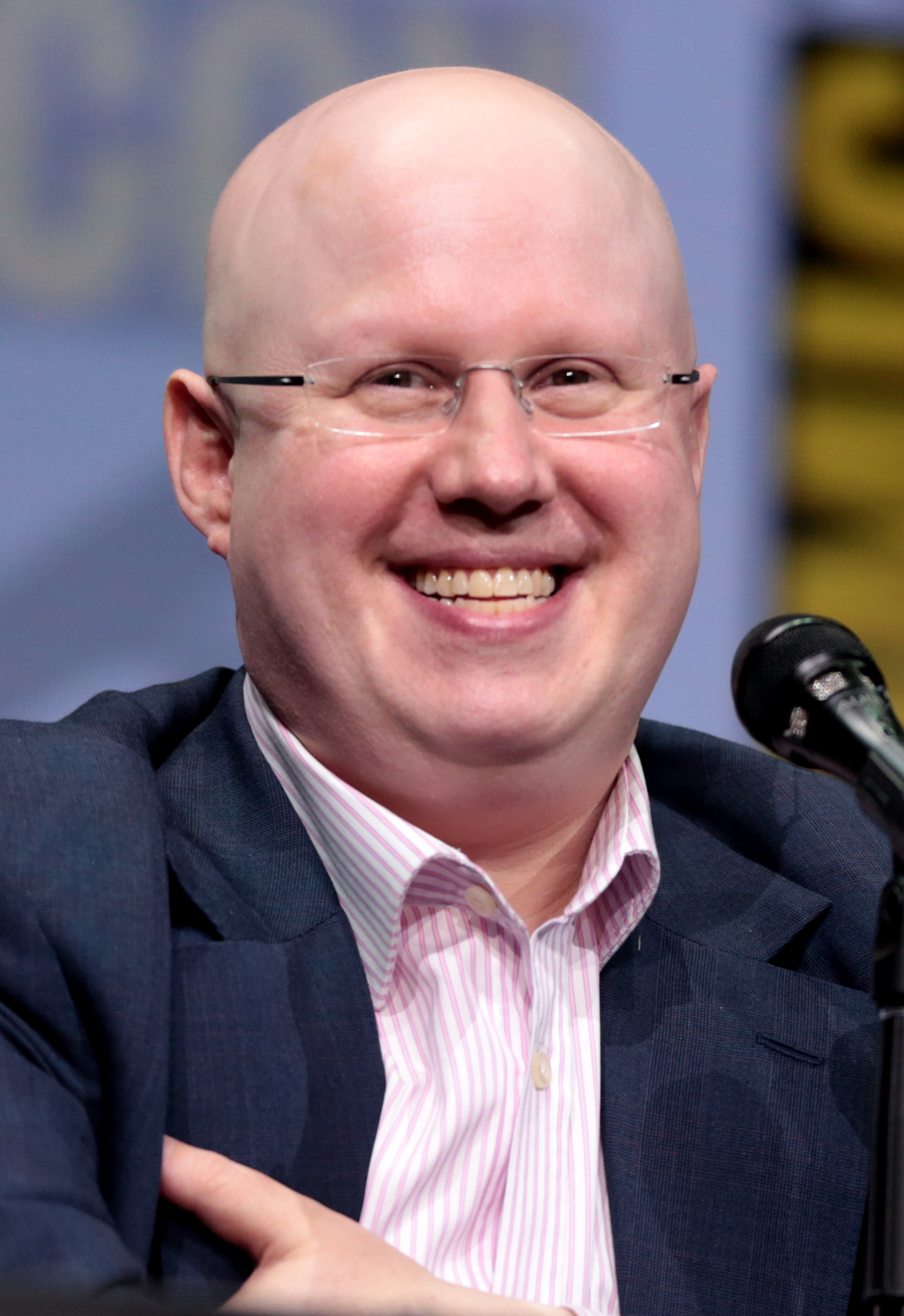
- Lucas at the 2017 San Diego Comic-Con
- Born: Matthew Richard Lucas; 5 March 1974 (age 52); Paddington, London, England
- Citizenship: United Kingdom; Germany (since 2021)
- Education: University of Bristol
- Occupations: Actor; comedian; writer; television presenter
- Years active: 1992–present
- Partner: Kevin McGee (c. 2002–2008)

Matthew Richard Lucas (born 5 March 1974) is an English actor, comedian, writer, and television presenter. He rose to prominence for his work with David Walliams on the BBC sketch comedy series Little Britain (2003–2006) and Come Fly with Me (2010–2011).

Lucas began his television career in the 1990s appearing on the BBC comedy series The Smell of Reeves and Mortimer (1995) and Shooting Stars (1995–2009). From 2015 to 2017, he played Nardole in the BBC sci-fi series Doctor Who. His film credits include Alice in Wonderland (2010), Bridesmaids (2011), Paddington (2014), Wonka (2023) and Gladiator II (2024). Lucas presented the Channel 4 baking competition show The Great British Bake Off, alongside Noel Fielding, from 2020 to 2023.

On stage, Lucas has appeared as Monsieur Thénardier in the musical Les Misérables for the 25th anniversary concert at The O2 (2010), the long-running West End production (2011 and 2019), the All-Star Staged Concert (2019–2020) and worldwide in the Arena Concert Spectacular (2025–2026). He has also appeared in Taboo (2002), Prick Up Your Ears (2009), Me and My Girl (2026) and Oliver! (2026).

== Early life ==
Matthew Richard Lucas was born in the Paddington area of central London, the son of Diana (née Williams) and chauffeuring business owner and convicted fraudster John Stanley Lucas. His family is Jewish; some of his mother's family fled Nazi Germany just before the Second World War. He was raised in a Reform Jewish household, although his parents came from Orthodox Jewish families. He has had alopecia since childhood, having lost all his hair after being struck by a car at the age of six. When Lucas was 22, his father died of a heart attack.

Lucas was educated at Aylward Primary School in Stanmore, north-west London, and Haberdashers' Boys' School in Borehamwood, Hertfordshire. He studied drama at the University of Bristol between 1992 and 1995, although he did not complete his degree. He also spent time with the National Youth Theatre, where he met his future collaborator David Walliams.

== Career ==
=== Early work ===
Lucas's association with Vic Reeves and Bob Mortimer began in 1992. He appeared in The Smell of Reeves and Mortimer in 1995, and went on to star with them in Shooting Stars. He quickly rose to fame as George Dawes, a giant baby (often dressed in an adult-sized romper suit) who would deliver a string of meaningless gags and insults before delivering the teams' scores, while sitting at and playing a drum kit. He also appeared on occasion as Marjorie Dawes, George's mother, who also appears in Little Britain.

He again appeared with Reeves & Mortimer in the BBC TV series Randall & Hopkirk (Deceased) and Catterick, in a variety of roles. In 1999, Lucas paired with David Walliams, with whom he had already worked in Mash and Peas and Sir Bernard's Stately Homes, to create Rock Profile, a comedy show spoofing famous musical personalities. It was one of their first collaborations.

His music video appearances include the Damien Hirst-directed video for Blur's "Country House", "Mudslide" by the Bluetones, alongside Walliams in 2000, "Jesusland" by Ben Folds in 2005, "I'm with Stupid" by Pet Shop Boys, and "Vindaloo" by Fat Les.

Lucas ventured into stage musicals in 2002, when he took a role in Boy George's musical Taboo at The Venue in London. He played the performance artist Leigh Bowery.

=== Little Britain ===
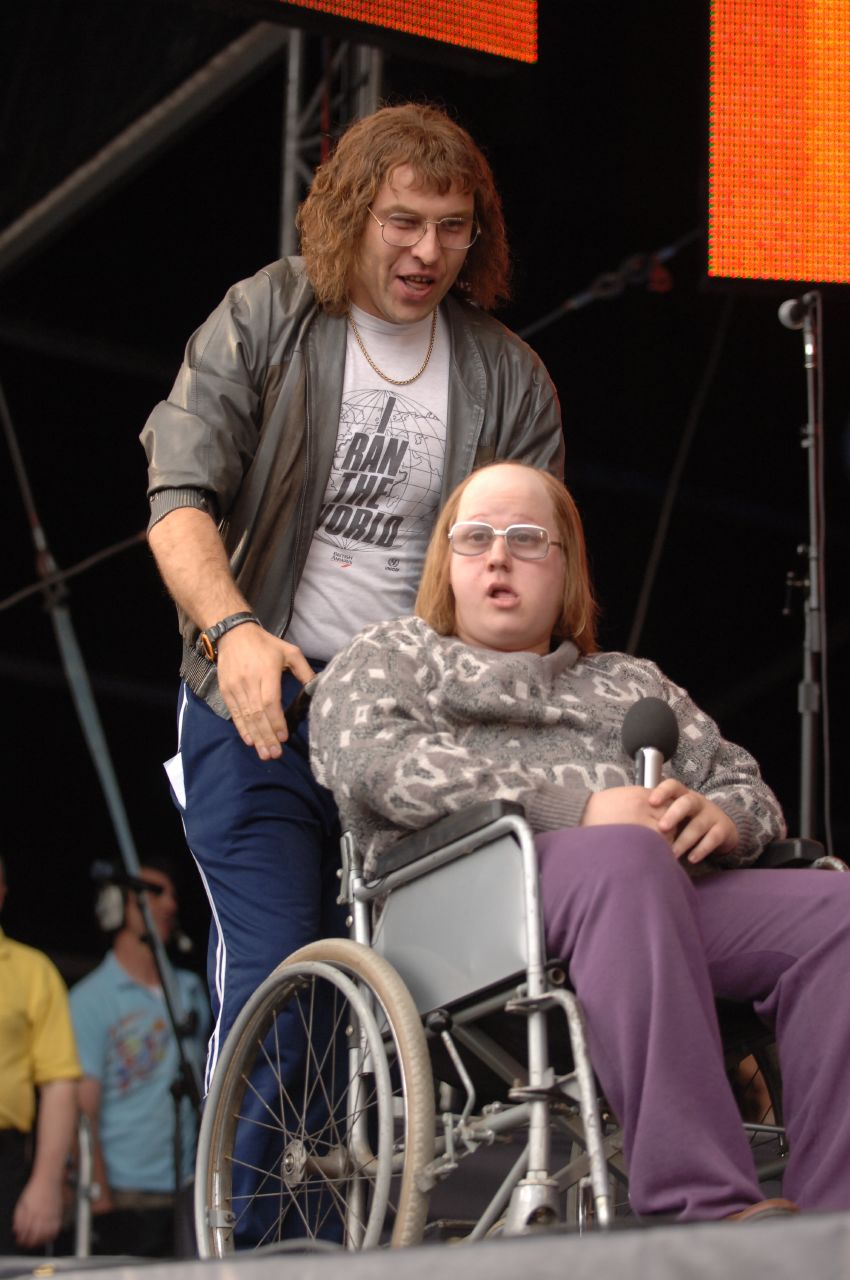
Walliams and Lucas in character as Lou and Andy at Live 8 in 2005

Little Britain is Lucas' most commercially successful work. The show came about when trainee BBC radio producer Ashley Blaker, tasked with coming up with ideas for a television or radio series, bumped into Lucas in London. The two were old friends from Haberdashers' and Lucas took Blaker to the Groucho Club, where he told Blaker of his ideas for a sketch show. Little Britain was launched as a radio show on BBC Radio 4 and it later became a TV series.

Among the many characters he plays in the series, which he wrote and acted in, along with David Walliams, are apparently "disabled" Andy Pipkin, teenage Bristol chav Vicky Pollard, homophobic homosexual Daffyd Thomas, and insensitive slimming club organiser Marjorie Dawes.

In January 2005, Lucas and Walliams were named the most powerful people in TV comedy by Radio Times.

=== Later career ===
In 2005, Lucas took his first role in a television drama, a supporting part as a Venetian duke in the BBC historical serial Casanova, written by Russell T Davies. Also in 2005, he did voice work in the ITV children's program King Arthur's Disasters alongside Rik Mayall. Since 2006, Lucas has been the voice of the radio and television character Digit Al, devised as part of a public information campaign on digital switchover. On 26 November 2006 he appeared on the BBC Radio 4 programme Desert Island Discs. He made a cameo appearance in Shaun of the Dead as Tom, the cousin of Shaun's friend Yvonne.

In 2007, Lucas released "(I'm Gonna Be) 500 Miles", originally by The Proclaimers, with Peter Kay as a charity single for Comic Relief. He performed the single as Little Britain character Andy Pipkin, along with Kay playing as Brian Potter. He also starred as Mr. Toad in The Wind in the Willows, a 2006 television adaptation of the Kenneth Grahame novel.

Lucas has appeared in Kath & Kim and Neighbours (the latter alongside David Walliams as Little Britain characters Lou and Andy), as well as a cameo role, playing 'Chris' or 'Jammy' at the wedding fayre, in the BBC Three sitcom Gavin & Stacey. Lucas has co-written (with Walliams) and performed in a new series of Little Britain USA for HBO. Lucas was the first celebrity to appear in 2008's Big Brother Celebrity Hijack on E4.

On 9 April 2009, the series Kröd Mändoon and the Flaming Sword of Fire, featuring Lucas as a regular performer, premièred on Comedy Central, the first major comedy series which Lucas had worked on since Little Britain. In 2010, Lucas played Tweedledee and Tweedledum in Tim Burton's Alice in Wonderland.

Starting in February 2010, Lucas began hosting his own radio show, And The Winner Is, in which he handed out a fictional series of awards based on nominations by his guests.

On 3 October 2010, Lucas played Monsieur Thénardier in the 25th Anniversary Concert of Les Misérables, at The O2 Arena in London for two performances. The following year from 23 June to 10 September 2011, he reprised the role at the Queen's Theatre, in the long-running West End production. He has since collaborated with Alfie Boe, who played Jean Valjean, to record a duet of "The Impossible Dream" on Boe's debut album.

Also in 2011, Lucas lent his voice to the CGI film Gnomeo and Juliet and he played a small role as the roommate of Kristen Wiig in the comedy Bridesmaids.

On Christmas Day 2010, the BBC premiered Lucas and David Walliams' latest series, Come Fly with Me. Unlike their previous work, Little Britain, this new show concentrated solely on the airline industry, with Walliams and Lucas each portraying several characters. In a BBC Three interview aired on 9 February 2011, it was revealed that the creators had considered including Carol Beer, the travel agent character from Little Britain. However, they chose not to include her to avoid the impression that Come Fly with Me was just a spinoff. Instead, they introduced an entirely fresh cast of characters.

On 28 March 2012, Lucas appeared as the "Generation X" guest on the Australian game show Talkin' 'Bout Your Generation. On 10 April 2012, Lucas's own BBC One show The Matt Lucas Awards began. It was a send-up of an awards program, with a panel of comedians giving their nominations for awards for a series of prizes concerning trivial topics.

Lucas also starred in the dark comedy Small Apartments released in February 2013 alongside James Caan, Billy Crystal, Johnny Knoxville, and Juno Temple with other cameo performances by notable actors. On 21 February 2013, Lucas appeared on the NBC series Community as Toby, an English friend of Abed Nadir. In 2014, Lucas played Ray Thomas in The Life of Rock with Brian Pern, as well as Joe the taxi driver in Paddington.

Lucas launched a new comedy series called Pompidou for BBC Two. The show began airing on 1 March 2015.

In May 2016, Lucas reprised his role as "Tweedledee/Tweedledum" in Tim Burton's Alice Through the Looking Glass, sequel to Alice in Wonderland. Lucas joined the BBC series Doctor Who for its tenth series, reprising the character Nardole, which he had previously played in the 2015 and 2016 Christmas specials, "The Husbands of River Song" and "The Return of Doctor Mysterio" respectively.

On 16 February 2017, Lucas was awarded an Honorary Degree "Doctor of Letters" by the University of Bristol, where he had studied for two years in the 1990s but had left before completing his degree course. On 3 October 2017, Lucas released his autobiography titled Little Me, published by Canongate Books in hardback. The paperback edition was released on 7 June 2018.

From 2 July to 25 August 2018, Lucas played Bill Snibson in a revival of Me and My Girl at Chichester Festival Theatre.

In January 2019, Lucas starred in a Netflix film titled Polar. In April, he voiced a character called Charlie in the family animated film The Queen's Corgi, and also voiced Mr Collick in Missing Link.

In 2019, Lucas was the bank holiday cover host for the Radio 2 Breakfast Show. He also covered Paul O'Grady's Sunday 5–7pm show during that summer. Fearne Cotton was the main breakfast show holiday cover host. In 2021, Lucas continued to sit in for Zoe Ball and host the Radio 2 Breakfast Show.

From 10 August to 30 November 2019, Lucas returned to playing Monsieur Thénardier in Les Misérables: The All-Star Staged Concert at the Gielgud Theatre in London's West End. On 20 December 2019, Lucas returned to the role at the Sondheim Theatre (previously the Queen's Theatre), after actor Gerard Carey contracted vocal damage through pneumonia and was forced to pull out. On 10 January 2020, Lucas himself was forced to withdraw from the show following a back injury. On 5 December 2020, Lucas returned again to the role for The All-Star Staged Concert which returned to the Sondheim Theatre to a socially-distant audience during the COVID-19 pandemic. The concert was due to run until 31 January 2021, however due to the government's guidelines, the production closed early on 15 December.

In March 2020, he became the new co-host of the Channel 4 and Love Productions television show The Great British Bake Off, taking over from Sandi Toksvig. He departed from the programme in December 2022.

On 3 April 2020, Lucas released a reworked version of his "Baked Potato Song" from Shooting Stars titled "Thank You Baked Potato", with all proceeds from the track going towards the Feed NHS campaign, which aims to provide meals for NHS workers in the midst of the COVID-19 pandemic in the UK. The song reached No. 34 in the charts. Lucas also wrote a children's picture book based on "Thank You, Baked Potato", published by Egmont and from which all proceeds again went to Feed NHS.

In 2020, Lucas, along with his Little Britain co-star David Walliams, apologised for their portrayal of characters using racial caricatures, "including an obese Caribbean woman called Desiree DeVere, portrayed in blackface, and a 'portly Thai bride' called Ting Tong." This was prompted after Netflix and BBC iPlayer removed the show from their catalogues.

In 2023, Lucas returned to Hollywood to star in the musical fantasy film Wonka, as one of the main antagonists, Gerald Prodnose. That year he also wrote a children's book titled The Boy Who Slept Through Christmas.

In 2024, he played a minor role in the historic epic action film Gladiator II as the Master of ceremonies. It serves as a sequel to Gladiator, which was released in 2000. He later revealed that he landed the role after his agent asked him to put in a tape, and he filmed it 80 times before sending it to the producers. He has said that he took inspiration for the character from David Hemmings in the original film, as well as Stanley Tucci in The Hunger Games.

In February 2025, Lucas reunited with David Walliams to present a twice weekly podcast entitled Making a Scene. In each episode they interview a different personality and discuss how their life would be portrayed in a biopic.

In 2025 and 2026, Lucas returned again to the role of Monsieur Thénardier in Les Misérables: The Arena Concert Spectacular touring selected dates across the UK, Sweden, Ireland, Australia and Netherlands finishing at the Royal Albert Hall in London and Radio City Music Hall in New York City.

In September 2026, Lucas appeared on Series 22 of the UK television series Taskmaster. Additionally, Lucas will play Fagin in the West End revival of Oliver! for six weeks only at the Gielgud Theatre (temporarily covering for Simon Lipkin).

== Personal life ==
Lucas is a patron of the Karen Morris Memorial Trust, a UK charity for leukaemia patients and their families. In April 2003, he appeared on Celebrity Who Wants to Be a Millionaire? and won £62,500 for the charity.

Lucas is gay. He first suspected his sexuality at age seven. At a ceremony in Central London in December 2006, he entered into a civil partnership with Kevin McGee. In attendance were Barbara Windsor, Neil Tennant, Elton John, and Courtney Love. They separated and had their civil partnership dissolved through the High Court in 2008.

From 2012 to 2015, Lucas lived with his Bridesmaids co-star Rebel Wilson in West Hollywood.

Lucas was raised as Jewish but has variously described himself as an atheist and a "fairly secular Jew". In 2022, he was the subject of BBC's Who Do You Think You Are? and learned that many of his grandmother's cousins had been murdered in the Holocaust. His grandmother's cousin, Werner Goldschmidt, had lived with the family of diarist Anne Frank as a sub-tenant in Amsterdam in 1942. In the episode, it is disclosed that his cousin is mentioned by name in Anne's diary, and was present in the apartment at the time of the family's last night there, before they went into hiding. In 2021, 83 years after his grandmother left Berlin, Lucas obtained German citizenship.

In February 2026, Lucas was followed on the London Underground by a pro-Palestinian supporter, who repeatedly shouted "Free Palestine" and called Lucas a "Zionist". The incident, captured on video, drew widespread media criticism; Lucas has rarely spoken publicly about Israel-Palestine matters, although he was a signatory to an open letter in October 2023 sent by Hollywood stars to U.S. President Joe Biden, calling for the release of Israeli hostages.

Lucas is an avid supporter of Arsenal Football Club.

Lucas was appointed Officer of the Order of the British Empire (OBE) in the 2026 New Year Honours for services to drama.

Lucas has stated he is autistic and has ADHD.

== Filmography ==
=== Films ===
Year	Title	Role	Notes	Ref.
1998	Jilting Joe	Air Steward		
1999	Plunkett & Macleane	Sir Oswald		
2004	Shaun of the Dead	Cousin Tom	Cameo	
2005	Cold and Dark	Dr. Elgin		
2009	Astro Boy	Sparx	Voice	
2010	Alice in Wonderland	Tweedledum and Tweedledee		
2010	The Infidel	Rabbi		
2010	Les Misérables in Concert: The 25th Anniversary	Thénardier		
2011	Gnomeo & Juliet	Benny	Voice	
2011	Bridesmaids	Gil		
2012	Small Apartments	Franklin Franklin		
2013	The Look of Love	Divine		
2013	In Secret	Olivier	Previously titled Thérèse	
2013	The Harry Hill Movie	Otto		
2014	Paddington	Joe		
2016	Alice Through the Looking Glass	Tweedledee and Tweedledum		
2017	How to Talk to Girls at Parties	PT Wain		
2018	A Futile and Stupid Gesture	Tony Hendra		
2018	Sherlock Gnomes	Benny	Voice	
2019	Polar	Mr. Blut		
2019	Missing Link	Mr. Collick	Voice	
2019	The Queen's Corgi	Charlie (UK version)	Voice	
2019	Les Misérables: The Staged Concert	Thénardier		
2022	I Came By	Great British Bake-Off Host		
2023	Wonka	Gerald Prodnose		
2024	Gladiator II	Master of ceremonies		

=== Television ===
Year	Title	Role	Notes	Ref.
1993	Minder	Extra	Episode: "Cars and Pints, and Pains"	
1995	The Imaginatively Titled Punt & Dennis Show		1 episode	
1995	The Smell of Reeves and Mortimer	Mayor Hobson / Pub Landlord / Quivell Mills	4 episodes	
1995–2009	Shooting Stars	George Dawes / Marjorie Dawes		
1996	Mash and Peas	Danny Mash / Various roles	9 episodes; also writer	
1997	Sunnyside Farm	Mr. Mills		
1997	It's Ulrika!	Various roles	Television film	
1998	Barking	Various Roles		
1998	You Are Here	Pat Magnet	Television film	
1999	Bang Bang, It's Reeves and Mortimer	Various roles	1 episode	
1999	Sir Bernard's Stately Homes	Sir Bernard Chumley	6 episodes	
1999–2022	Rock Profile	Various characters	31 episodes; also writer	
2000	Da Ali G Show		Wrote 1 episode	
2000	Lum the Invader Girl	Ataru Moroboshi	Voice, English BBC dub of Urusei Yatsura; 2 episodes	
2001	Fun at the Funeral Parlour	Father Titmus / Isaac Hunt	2 episodes	
2001	Randall & Hopkirk (Deceased)	Nesbit	Episode: "Revenge of the Bog People"	
2002	Surrealissimo: The Scandalous Success of Salvador Dalí	Luis Buñuel	Television film	
2002	Captain V		Television film	
2003	Comic Relief 2003: The Big Hair Do	Su Pollard: Blankety Blank	Television film	
2003–2006	Little Britain	Various Roles	23 episodes; also writer	
2004	Catterick	Roy Oates / Dan the Shellfish Man / Webster	6 episodes	
2004	French and Saunders		1 episode	
2004	The All-Star Comedy Show	Various roles	Television film	
2004	AD/BC: A Rock Opera	God	Television film	
2005	Look Around You	Dr. Phillip Lavender	2 episodes	
2005	Casanova	Villars	Mini-series; 2 episodes	
2005–2006	King Arthur's Disasters	Merlin		
2006	Popetown	Cardinal One / Jackie Cohen	10 episodes	
2006	The Wind in the Willows	Mr. Toad	Television film	
2007	The National Television Awards 2007	Lou	Television film	
2007	Gavin & Stacey	Jammy	1 episode	
2007	Neighbours	Andy Pipkin	Episode: "British Bulldog"	
2007	Kath & Kim	Karen	2 episodes	
2008	Little Britain USA	Various roles	6 episodes; also writer and executive producer	
2009	Kröd Mändoon and the Flaming Sword of Fire	Chancellor Dongalor	6 episodes	
2009	Comic Relief 2009	Julie / Matt Van-Laaast / Ellie Grace	Television film	
2009	Pride of Britain Awards 2009	Andy	Television film	
2010	Funny or Die Presents	Graham Rhys Grahamcox	Episode: "The Carpet Brothers"	
2010	The One Ronnie	Various characters	Television film	
2010–2011	Come Fly with Me	Various roles / Fearghal O'Farrell / Keeley St Clair / Mickey Minchin	6 episodes; also writer and associate producer	
2012	The Greatest Footie Ads Ever	Andy	Television film	
2012–2013	Portlandia	Stu	2 episodes	
2013	Community	Toby Weeks	Episode: "Conventions of Space and Time"	
2013	Super Fun Night	Derrick	Guest appearance	
2014	The Life of Rock with Brian Pern	Ray Thomas		
2015	Pompidou	Pompidou	Also writer and director	
2015	Fresh Off the Boat	Mr. Fisher	Episode: "Boy II Man"	
2015	Man Seeking Woman	Igor	Episode: "Teacup"	
2015–2017	Doctor Who	Nardole	15 episodes	
2016	Bull	Mr. Richards	Episode: "A Faberge Egg"	
2016	Galavant	Peasant John	Episode: "Aw, Hell, the King"	
2016	Mack & Moxy	Admirable Matt	Episode: "A Spectrum of Possibilities"	
2016	A Midsummer Night's Dream	Nick Bottom	Television film	
2016	Round Planet	Narrator	10 episodes	
2017	Bill Nye Saves the World	Himself	Episode: "The Sexual Spectrum"	
2017	Stella	Wes	Episode: 6.1	
2018	Who Is America?	—N/a	Writer ("104")	
2019	Moominvalley	Teety-Woo	In production	
2020	Reasons to Be Cheerful with Matt Lucas	Presenter		
2020–2023	The Great British Bake Off	Co-presenter	Alongside Noel Fielding; replaced Sandi Toksvig	
2021	The Masked Singer	Guest panelist	Series 2, Episode 7; Semi-final	
2021	50 Years of Mr Men with Matt Lucas	Presenter	TV documentary	
2021	Legends of Tomorrow	Aleister Crowley	Voice; 2 episodes	
2021	RuPaul's Drag Race UK	Guest Judge	Episode: "The Return of Royalty"	
2021	Gogglebox for Stand Up to Cancer	Himself	Series 18, episode 5 (Su2c special)	
2022	Deep Heat	Administrator	The Showcase	
2022–2024	Fantasy Football League	Co-presenter	Co-writer	
2026	The Masked Singer	Emperor Penguin	One episode	
2026	Taskmaster	Himself (contestant)	Series 22, 10 episodes	

=== Shorts ===
Year	Title	Role	Notes	Ref.
1996	Shooting Stars: Unviewed and Nude	George Dawes	Video	
1997	Dennis Pennis R.I.P.	'The Quill'	Video	
2003	Moo(n)	Bee	Short	
2003	Welcome to Glaringly	Various roles	Short	
2005	Alan Partridge Presents: The Cream of British Comedy	Daffydd Thomas	Video	
2007	Fievel Throws Down		Short	
2010	The RRF in New Recruit	Sparx	Voice, video short	
2020	The Best of Days	Nardole	Voice, video short	

=== Audio dramas ===
Year	Title	Role	Ref.
2001	Doctor Who: The One Doctor	Cylinder / The Jelloid	

=== Theatre ===
Year	Production	Role	Director	Venue	Notes	Ref.
2002	Taboo	Leigh Bowery	Christopher Renshaw	Venue Theatre, London	West End	
2005–2007	Little Britain Live	Writer and performer (various roles)	Jeremy Sams	Various	UK and Australian tours	
2009	Prick Up Your Ears	Kenneth Halliwell	Daniel Kramer	Comedy Theatre, London	West End	
2010	Les Misérables	Thénardier	Laurence Connor and James Powell	The O2, London	25th Anniversary Concert	
2011	Les Misérables	Thénardier	Trevor Nunn and John Caird	Queen's Theatre, London	West End	
2018	Me and My Girl	Bill Snibson	Daniel Evans	Chichester Festival Theatre	Regional	
2019	Les Misérables	Thénardier	James Powell and Jean-Pierre van der Spuy	Gielgud Theatre, London	West End - Staged Concert	
2019–2020	Les Misérables	Thénardier	Laurence Connor and James Powell	Sondheim Theatre, London	West End	
2020	Les Misérables	Thénardier	James Powell and Jean-Pierre van der Spuy	Sondheim Theatre, London	West End - Staged Concert	
2025–2026	Les Misérables	Thénardier	James Powell and Jean-Pierre van der Spuy	Various in the UK, Sweden, Ireland, Australia, and the Netherlands	Arena Spectacular World Tour	
2026	Les Misérables	Thénardier	James Powell and Jean-Pierre van der Spuy	Royal Albert Hall	Arena Spectacular World Tour	
2026	Les Misérables	Thénardier	James Powell and Jean-Pierre van der Spuy	Radio City Music Hall	Arena Spectacular World Tour	
2026	Oliver!	Fagin	Matthew Bourne	Gielgud Theatre	West End	

=== Stage guest appearances ===
- Monty Python Live (Mostly) - The O2 (2014)
- The Comeback - Noël Coward Theatre (2020)
- Inside No. 9 Stage/Fright - Wyndham's Theatre (2025)

== Bibliography ==
- Boyd Hilton; Matt Lucas; David Walliams (2006). Inside Little Britain. London: Ebury Press. ISBN 978-0-09-191231-4.
- Lucas, Matt (2017). Little Me. London: Canongate. ISBN 978-1786890863.
- Lucas, Matt (2023). The Boy Who Slept Through Christmas. Glasgow: Farshore. ISBN 978-0008519896.
- Lucas, Matt (2025). BobLand. Glasgow: Farshore. ISBN 978-0008519940.
