= Goldsmiths Tavern =

Pub in Lewisham, London, England

Coordinates: 51°28′32″N 0°02′13″W

The Goldsmiths Tavern
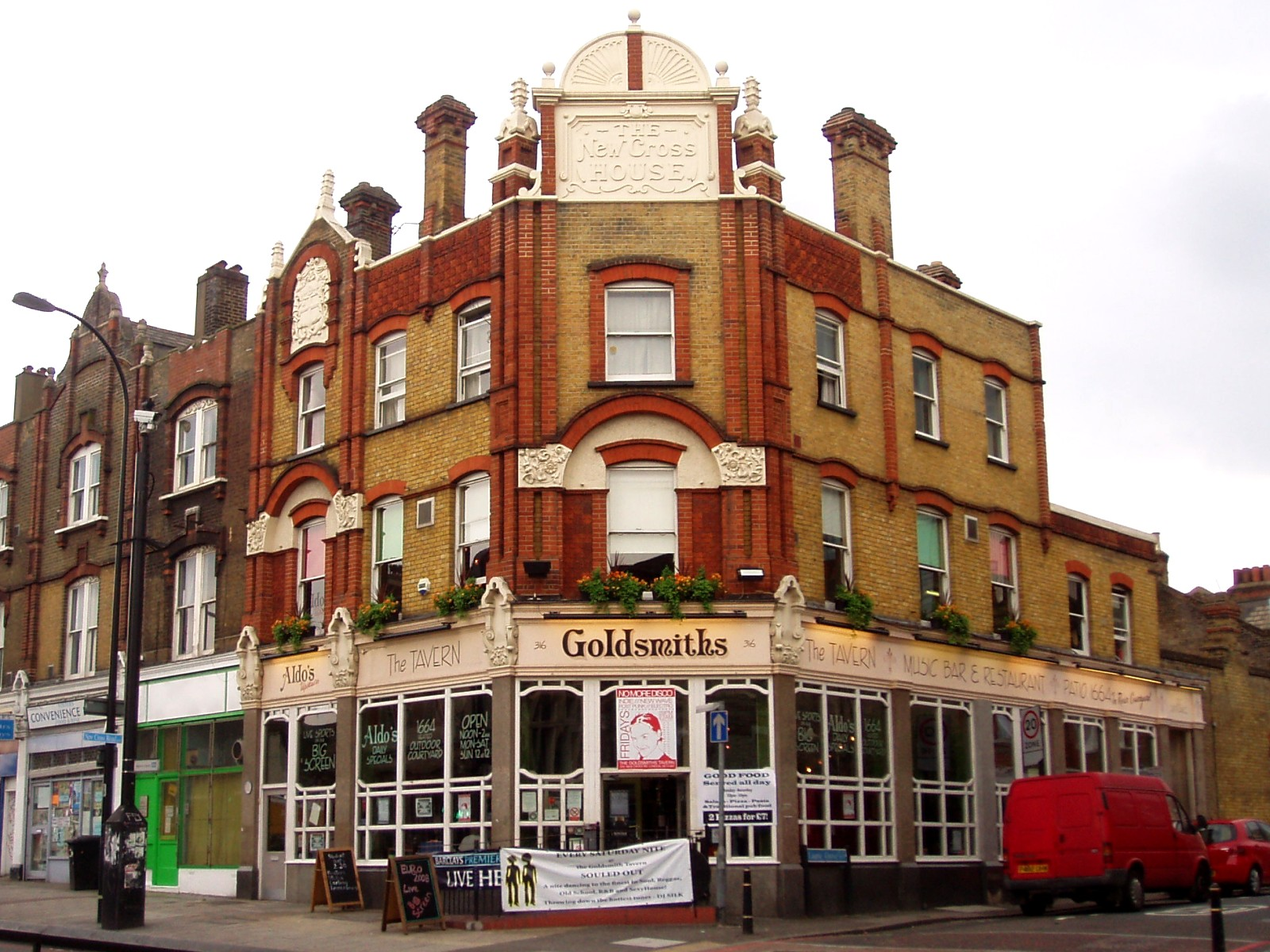
- Interactive map of The Goldsmiths Tavern
- Location: 316 New Cross Rd, Lewisham, London, SE14

Construction
- Closed: 2003

The Goldsmiths Tavern was a pub and venue for both live music and comedy located at 316 New Cross Road, in the New Cross area of the London Borough of Lewisham in south-east London.

== History ==
The pub was originally named The New Cross House. Nathan Dews' book The History of Deptford from 1884 refers to a pub of that name "at the top of Clifton Hill", and so presumably in roughly the same spot. An issue of the Berkshire Chronicle from 16 July 1825 also refers to an establishment of that name in Deptford. The original building was demolished and rebuilt around 1870.

Local wrestling and boxing instructor Jack Wannop taught in the back room, then known as The Glass House, around 1885. The pub hosted a series of wrestling meets under Wannop’s management.

In the 1960s Goldsmiths University students ran a folk club there. The club saw performances by acts such as Pete Stanley, and Peggy Seeger.

It changed its name in the early 1980s to the Goldsmiths Tavern after the University. It was the original venue of Vic Reeves Big Night Out, a live comedy night he started there in 1986 before moving it to the Albany Empire in 1988, and also where Reeves met future comedy partner Bob Mortimer.

Whilst generally attracting a mixed clientele, it held gay nights in the 1980s and was considered an LGBTQ friendly space. Paul O'Grady would also perform there. A club night named The Gift, calling itself "The only London Gay Alternative Club", ran there in the mid-1980s and hosted bands such as The Love Act and The House of Love.

Other bands to play the pub in the 1980s included The Ex, The Prisoners, The Dentists, Alternative TV and Test Department.

In the 1990s the pub was a venue for techno and drum and bass nights, as well as punk and anarcho-punk bands. Acts to play there included Radical Dance Faction, Back to the Planet, U.K. Subs, and Senser. Inner Terrestrials recorded a live album titled Escape From New Cross there in 1997.

It closed following a big police raid, then re-opened as just a pub in 2003.

The building is still a pub, though since 2011 it is once again named The New Cross House.
