= Randall & Hopkirk (Deceased) (2000 TV series) =

British television series

- Created by: Dennis Spooner
- Starring: Vic Reeves; Bob Mortimer; Emilia Fox; Tom Baker; Charlie Higson
- Theme music composer: David Arnold; Tim Simenon
- Composer: Murray Gold
- Country of origin: United Kingdom
- Original language: English
- No. of series: 2
- No. of episodes: 13

Production
- Executive producer: Simon Wright
- Producer: Charlie Higson
- Cinematography: John Ignatius
- Running time: 49–51 minutes
- Production company: Working Title Television

Original release
- Network: BBC One
- Release: 18 March 2000 – 10 November 2001

Randall & Hopkirk (Deceased) is a British television series, produced by Working Title Television (WTTV) for BBC One, written and produced by Charlie Higson. It is a revival of the 1960s’ television series Randall and Hopkirk (Deceased) and stars Vic Reeves as Marty Hopkirk and Bob Mortimer as Jeff Randall, two partner private detectives, Emilia Fox as Jeannie Hurst, Hopkirk's fiancée, and Tom Baker as Wyvern, a spirit mentor. Two series were commissioned and were broadcast in 2000 and 2001 with the pilot episode airing 18 March 2000.

In keeping with the original series, in the initial episode Hopkirk is murdered during an investigation and returns to Earth as a ghost tied to his partner Randall. Randall is the only living main character who is able to see him (though occasionally other characters can). The remake paid much more attention than the original to where Hopkirk was when he was not on Earth and introduced Limbo, a place where he could meet other ghosts. It also introduced the character Wyvern, a mentor who helps Hopkirk hone his powers, introduces him to other ghosts, and is terrible at poetry. The remake also made Jeannie a more important character than the original and changed her status to Hopkirk's fiancée, rather than widow, allowing for a love-triangle element between the three main characters to form.

== Background ==
Two series were made, the first in 1999 (broadcast in 2000) and the second in 2001. The show was produced by Charlie Higson, who also directed some episodes. Writers for the series include Gareth Roberts, Mark Gatiss and Jeremy Dyson, Paul Whitehouse, and Higson. When the rights to the series were first obtained by WTTV, Simon Wright, the company's executive producer and president, envisaged the series as a straight thriller, but this changed after he suggested casting a comedian as Marty Hopkirk with Robbie Coltrane and Rik Mayall originally considered for the role. After discovering that the rights had been bought by WTTV, Reeves and Mortimer showed a strong interest in the two lead roles. After being offered the roles, the pair suggested Charlie Higson as writer.

Mortimer was initially to play Marty Hopkirk, to echo the physical characteristics of the original actors, but this was changed as Higson felt that Reeves' "manic energy" better suited Hopkirk's personality and situation. Reeves and Mortimer are both fans of the original series, with Reeves citing Hopkirk as the inspiration behind his all-white outfit in the pilot episode of Vic Reeves Big Night Out.

Reeves, Mortimer and Higson's connections helped to draw in many cameos and guest stars from the comedy world and beyond, to play bit parts or larger roles in individual episodes. Guest stars include Hugh Laurie, Derek Jacobi, Simon Pegg, Mark Gatiss, Charles Dance, Matt Lucas, David Walliams, Reece Shearsmith, and Martin Clunes. Higson himself cameos in every episode, twice as characters who appear in more than one: these were Gomez the Limbo barman in "A Blast from the Past" and "Marshall and Snellgrove" and civil servant Bulstrode in "Paranoia" and "Pain Killers".

Many episodes include story lines or mentions that pay homage to the original series. In the fifth episode of series one, a clip of Mike Pratt, who played Jeff Randall in the original series and had died before the new series was created, was used, from the episode "The Smile Behind the Veil". Kenneth Cope, who played the original Marty Hopkirk, was asked to cameo, but declined. Place names also paid homage to the original series: Spooner Drive and Berman Street – after creator Dennis Spooner and producer Monty Berman – are used in the first episode of series one; and Cope House – after Kenneth Cope – is the name of the building where the duo's office is based.

== Episodes ==
=== Series 1 ===
No.	Title	Directed by	Written by	Original release date	Viewers (millions)
1	"Drop Dead"	Mark Mylod	Charlie Higson	18 March 2000	10.63
Whilst working for a troubled artist, Marty is killed by the artist's apparently suicidal wife, but all is not as it seems and Marty is allowed one night to return and solve the mystery of his murder. Guest starring David Tennant, Charles Dance, Mark Gatiss and Steve Pemberton.
2	"Mental Apparition Disorder"	Rachel Talalay	Charlie Higson, based on original story by Mike Pratt and Ian Wilson	25 March 2000	8.1
After revealing to Jeannie that he can talk to the ghost of Marty, Jeff finds himself spending a week at a psychiatric retreat. However, the doctor running the retreat has a terrible secret. Guest starring Martin Clunes, Hugh Laurie, Steven Berkoff, Fiona Allen and Richard Todd.
3	"The Best Years of Your Death"	Mark Mylod	Charlie Higson	1 April 2000	6.29
After Jeannie receives a disturbing message from her nephew, she and Jeff go undercover at the boy's new boarding school and discover a horrific secret. Guest starring Peter Bowles and Anthony Daniels.
4	"Paranoia"	Charlie Higson	Charlie Higson and Paul Whitehouse	8 April 2000	6.09
Hired to protect a man who will shortly be presenting evidence of several politically damaging events, the duo find themselves protecting their client from assassins determined to obtain and sell the secrets themselves. Guest starring Paul Rhys, Alexis Denisof, Simon Pegg, Simon Day, Arabella Weir, Rhys Thomas and Tony Way.
5	"A Blast From the Past"	Rachel Talalay	Charlie Higson	15 April 2000	6.06
When a retired policeman turns up asking for help to locate an old enemy, Marty finds himself on the run from the ghost of the criminal's brother, who is seeking revenge for his death at the hands of Marty's father. Guest starring Paul Whitehouse, Mark Benton, Dudley Sutton and Patrick Ryecart.
6	"A Man of Substance"	Mark Mylod	Charlie Higson	22 April 2000	N/K (<5.85)
Whilst investigating the disappearance of a businessman, the pair find themselves stuck in a mysterious village called Hadell Wroxted whose inhabitants are able to both see and hear Marty. Guest starring Gareth Thomas, Elizabeth Spriggs, Phil Smeeton and Hugh Lloyd.

=== Series 2 ===
No.	Title	Directed by	Written by	Original release date
7	"Whatever Possessed You"	Metin Huseyin	Charlie Higson and Gareth Roberts	29 September 2001
Jeff and Jeannie check into a remote hotel which has been the site of various murders going back almost 50 years. Marty returns to help and discovers a supernatural element to the mystery. Guest starring David Walliams, John Thomson, Hywel Bennett and Janet Henfrey.
8	"Revenge of the Bog People"	Charlie Higson	Charlie Higson and Kate Woods	6 October 2001
Jeff runs into an old flame and agrees to re-open an old case in order to attempt to clear her father's name. Guest starring Matt Lucas, Celia Imrie, Mark Williams, Freddie Jones and Adam Buxton.
9	"O Happy Isle"	Metin Huseyin	Charlie Higson	13 October 2001
A young man is found dead on a small island. According to the local police it was a simple suicide, but Jeff and Marty suspect the locals have something to hide at the local brewery. Guest starring John Sessions, Ford Kiernan and George Baker.
10	"Pain Killers"	Charlie Higson	Gareth Roberts	20 October 2001
Hired to investigate the death of an undercover agent, Jeff and Jeannie meet a mysterious man who is attempting to recreate a rainforest ecosystem in an underground facility, but why? Guest starring Derek Jacobi, Dervla Kirwan, Duncan Preston and Alibe Parsons.
11	"Marshall & Snellgrove"	Metin Huseyin	Charlie Higson	27 October 2001
A case involving feuding twins and a large inheritance goes horribly wrong when one of a rival detective duo is seemingly killed by one of the twins. Rather than 'going up' the deceased detective begs Marty to help him solve his own murder. Guest starring Shaun Parkes and Colin McFarlane.
12	"The Glorious Butranekh"	Charlie Higson	Charlie Higson	3 November 2001
After receiving a call from their old secretary, the detectives travel to Latvia to solve the disappearance of their old friend's husband and baby son. Guest starring Pauline Quirke.
13	"Two Can Play That Game"	Steve Bendelack	Mark Gatiss and Jeremy Dyson	24 November 2001
Jeannie goes missing and whilst tracking her down Jeff finds himself trapped in an abandoned department store. Meanwhile, after Marty and Jeff have a falling out Marty finds himself in a part of the afterlife filled with other ghosts who also fell out with their chosen ones, but they don't seem to want him to leave. Guest starring Roy Hudd, Eleanor Bron and Reece Shearsmith.

== Soundtrack ==
A soundtrack album to the series was released by Island Records in 2000. The show's theme, which plays over the opening titles of the series, was written by David Arnold but was not included on the soundtrack album.

Incidental music for the show was written by Murray Gold who also wrote various stings and pieces based on Arnold's theme. An original song, "My Body May Die", was written for the show by Pulp and featured The Swingle Singers. This song became associated with Marty's character when he was onscreen.

Randall & Hopkirk (Deceased) The Soundtrack
No.	Title	Artist	Length
1.	"Theme from Randall & Hopkirk (Deceased)"	Nina Persson & David Arnold	4:13
2.	"Jus' Tonight"	Basement Jaxx feat. Gwyn Jay Allen	3:59
3.	"Confusion"	James	3:41
4.	"My Beautiful Friend"	The Charlatans	4:02
5.	"My Body May Die"	Pulp vs The Swingle Sisters	3:53
6.	"Eve"	Spacek	5:07
7.	"Hamlet of Kings"	The Orb	2:17
8.	"To You Alone"	The Beta Band	4:52
9.	"Carnival of Drums"	Talvin Singh	6:40
10.	"U.S. Roach"	Gay Dad	4:08
11.	"Zero Zero"	Witness	3:46
12.	"Dead Things"	Emiliana Torrini	4:24
13.	"Blue Eyes"	Lewis Taylor	3:44

A vocal version of the theme sung by Nina Persson of The Cardigans was also released in 2000 and featured in the episode "Revenge of the Bog People". The vocal version was originally written as a duet, with Reeves to sing with Persson. While not featuring on the final theme, a bonus track sung by Reeves was included on the single, a cover of "Ain't That a Kick in the Head?". The extended instrumental of Arnold's theme was also included as a B-side on the single.

Theme from Randall & Hopkirk (Deceased)
No.	Title	Artist	Length
1.	"Theme from Randall & Hopkirk (Deceased)"	Nina Persson & David Arnold	4:13
2.	"Theme from Randall & Hopkirk (Deceased)" (instrumental)	David Arnold	4:24
3.	"Ain't That a Kick in the Head?"	Vic Reeves	2:25

== Books ==
A tie-in book Randall and Hopkirk (Deceased): the files was released after the second series, written by Andy Lane with an introduction by Charlie Higson.

Two novelisations of the series were also released, Ghosts from the Past, written by Graeme Grant and Ghost in the Machine by Andy Lane. Both were published by Macmillan Publishers.

== See also ==
- List of ghost films
