= Bob Mortimer =

English comedian, presenter, actor (born 1959)

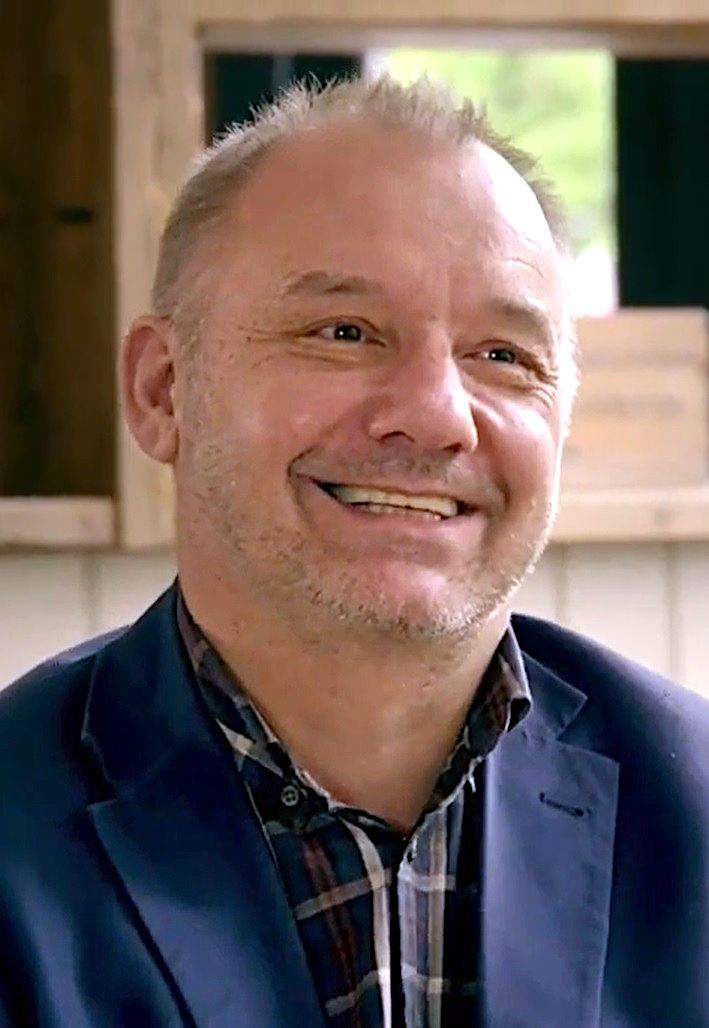
- Mortimer in 2017
- Born: Robert Renwick Mortimer; 23 May 1959 (age 67); Middlesbrough, England
- Education: University of Sussex; University of Leicester
- Occupations: Comedian, television presenter, writer and actor
- Years active: 1986–present
- Spouse: Lisa Matthews (m. 2015)
- Children: 2

Robert Renwick Mortimer (born 23 May 1959) is an English comedian, television presenter, writer and actor. He is one half of the comedy double act Reeves and Mortimer with Vic Reeves, and appears in the Mortimer & Whitehouse: Gone Fishing series with Paul Whitehouse. He has appeared on TV panel shows such as Would I Lie to You? and Taskmaster. In 2026, for his performance on Last One Laughing, he was awarded the British Academy Television Award for Best Entertainment Performance.

== Early life ==
Mortimer was born in Middlesbrough on 23 May 1959, and grew up with three brothers in the town's Linthorpe area. His father died in a car crash when Mortimer was seven. At around the same time, Mortimer accidentally burnt down his family's home with a firework. He attended King's Manor School in Middlesbrough, where his schoolmates included future sports presenter Ali Brownlee. A keen football fan, he had trials for local club Middlesbrough, but abandoned his footballing dreams due to early-onset arthritis.

Mortimer left school with three A-Levels and went on to study law at the University of Sussex and University of Leicester. There, he became a punk, and started a band called Dog Dirt. After leaving university with an LL.M. in Welfare Law, he moved to London and became a solicitor for Southwark Council. He then moved to a private practice in Peckham, where his work with Public Health Act cases regarding cockroach infestations of council properties led to a local paper, the South London Press, dubbing him "The Cockroach King". According to his autobiography, he was mugged during this time by one of his clients, who stopped and apologised after recognising him; he continued to represent the client.

== Career ==
=== Partnership with Vic Reeves ===
In 1986, Mortimer went to the Goldsmiths Tavern in New Cross, London, to see a new show by the comedian Vic Reeves. Mortimer was impressed by the performance, particularly the character Tappy Lappy, which was Reeves attempting to tap dance while wearing a Bryan Ferry mask and planks on his feet. Mortimer approached Reeves after the show, and the two began writing material for the next week's show together. They also became good friends and formed a band, the Potter's Wheel. Mortimer began to perform on the show, which was christened Vic Reeves Big Night Out, creating characters such as the Singing Lawyer, Graham Lister, Judge Nutmeg and the Man With the Stick.

The show became successful in South London and eventually outgrew Goldsmiths Tavern, moving in 1988 to the Albany Empire in Deptford. Mortimer soon became an integral part of the performance, providing him with a weekly break from his legal work, which had begun to disillusion him.

Reeves and Mortimer made their television debut on the short-lived 1989 comedy chat show One Hour with Jonathan Ross, in the game show segment known as "Knock down ginger". Later that year, the duo made their first television pilot together, Vic Reeves Big Night Out. The television show remained true to the nightclub act's variety show format. Mortimer took a 10-week break from his legal job to record the series and never returned.

The two later created a one-off pilot for a sitcom called The Weekenders in 1992, followed by the sketch show The Smell of Reeves and Mortimer in 1993, and Shooting Stars, a comedy panel show that first aired in December 1993. After being commissioned, Shooting Stars ran for five series between 1995 and 2002, with a special anniversary edition broadcast in December 2008. A sixth series was broadcast in late 2009, followed by a seventh series in mid-2010, and an eighth in 2011.

In 1999, Reeves and Mortimer appeared in a second sketch show called Bang Bang, It's Reeves and Mortimer. A year later, Mortimer played the part of Jeff Randall in Randall & Hopkirk (Deceased), opposite Reeves as Marty Hopkirk and Emilia Fox as Jeannie Hurst.

In 2003, Mortimer and Reeves were listed in The Observer as one of the 50 funniest acts in British comedy. In a 2005 poll to find the Comedians' Comedian, the duo were voted the 9th greatest comedy act of all time by fellow comedians and comedy insiders.

In 2004, Mortimer and Reeves wrote and starred in Catterick, a six-episode surreal comedy about an ex-soldier, Carl, who returns home from serving in Cyprus to join his brother Chris, who has agreed to help find Carl's son. Cast included Reece Shearsmith, Matt Lucas, Morwenna Banks, Tim Healy, Mark Benton and Charlie Higson.

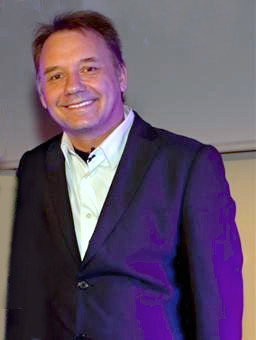
Mortimer in February 2010

On 17 November 2007, Mortimer appeared as Reeves' hairdresser, Carl, in the weekly radio sketch show on BBC Radio 2 titled Vic Reeves' House Arrest.

On 27 February 2008, Reeves announced that he and Mortimer were working together on a new sitcom about superheroes who get their powers through a malfunctioning telegraph pole.

In November 2013, Reeves and Mortimer filmed episodes of a new BBC sitcom, House of Fools, also featuring Matt Berry (as Beef), Morgana Robinson (as Julie) and Dan Skinner (as Bosh).

In October 2015, the pair cancelled the first leg of their live tour, 25 Year of Reeves and Mortimer: The Poignant Moments, after Mortimer underwent an emergency triple heart bypass.

On 29 December 2017, Mortimer and Reeves starred in a relaunch and new singular episode of their comedy Big Night Out for the BBC. The show has been remade and subsequently renamed to Vic and Bob's Big Night Out. The episode remained true to the classic Big Night Out formula and was composed of various comedy songs, skits, characters and sketches. This was the first time the Big Night Out series had featured Mortimer's name in the title. A full series of Vic and Bob's Big Night Out began on BBC Four in November 2018.

=== Solo career and appearances ===
In 1997, in collaboration with Chris Rea, Mortimer recorded Rea's hit "Let's Dance" with his favourite football team, Middlesbrough. The single reached No. 44 in the UK Singles Chart. In 1996–97, Mortimer appeared on an episode of Mash and Peas with Matt Lucas, David Walliams and Reece Shearsmith, in a sketch spoofing Seinfeld, called I'm Bland... yet all my friends are krazy!. From 1996 to 2011 Mortimer voiced the animated bulldog in adverts for Churchill Insurance. Churchill's "Oh, yes!" catchphrase is believed to be an impersonation of Potter the Janitor (played by Deryck Guyler) from the television series of the 1970s, Please Sir!. Older adverts had Mortimer's voice responding to questions posed by his comedy partner, Vic Reeves. In April 2005, however, Reeves was removed from the adverts, after he was convicted of drink-driving.

In July 2002, Mortimer fought and defeated Les Dennis on points, in the BBC's first Celebrity Boxing match, as part of Sport Relief 2002. In 2002, Mortimer presented the Channel 4 list show The 100 Greatest World Cup Moments of All Time! An updated show, again hosted by Mortimer, was broadcast by the channel in 2010, to coincide with the 2010 FIFA World Cup. Mortimer produced and presented the second match, The Fight, a year later, which saw Grant Bovey versus Ricky Gervais. In 2005, Mortimer hosted his first major TV series without Reeves, a comedy panel game for BBC One, called 29 Minutes of Fame, which featured regular guests such as Jo Brand.

Also in 2005, Mortimer voiced the character of Father Nicholas in the animated BBC Three series Popetown. The show was not broadcast by the channel, for fear of offending Catholic viewers, though it saw a DVD release later that year. Mortimer co-wrote the BBC Three sketch comedy Tittybangbang with Jill Parker. The programme starred Lucy Montgomery and Debbie Chazen, with Tony Way, and ran for three series between 2006 and 2007.

Mortimer appeared on BBC Two's Never Mind the Buzzcocks on four occasions – in 1996, on Sean Hughes' team; in 2000, on Phill Jupitus's team; in 2008, as a guest team captain; and in 2012, as a guest host. In April 2010, Mortimer appeared on the Sky1 panel show A League of Their Own, on Andrew Flintoff's team.

Mortimer has been a regular guest panellist on the BBC1 quiz show Would I Lie to You? since 2012, having appeared in twelve episodes up to the 2024/5 series. He has since stated that his appearances on this show have given him more recognition than any of his previous work. In November 2013, Mortimer appeared on an episode of Ross Noble Freewheeling.

Also in 2013, Mortimer played Frank in the E4 sitcom Drifters. On 18 June 2014, Mortimer appeared on an episode of the Dave show, Alan Davies: As Yet Untitled. On 4 March 2015, he appeared in Let's Play Darts, but lost out to Roisin Conaty. In 2015, he appeared in an episode of Celebrity Squares alongside Vic Reeves. In April 2015, Mortimer took over from the late Rik Mayall as Bombardier Bedford, the mascot of Wells Bombardier Beer.

From 2016 to 2026, Mortimer wrote and co-hosted comedy sketch podcast, Athletico Mince, alongside Andy Dawson. Mortimer has appeared on numerous episodes of the Sky1 comedy panel game Duck Quacks Don't Echo, hosted by his regular Would I Lie to You? team captain, Lee Mack. In 2017, Mortimer competed in and won series 5 of Taskmaster against Aisling Bea, Sally Phillips, Nish Kumar and Mark Watson. He then competed in the Taskmaster: Champion of Champions series against Noel Fielding, Josh Widdicombe, Katherine Ryan and Rob Beckett, coming last.

In June and July 2018, Mortimer teamed up with his longtime friend and fellow comedian, Paul Whitehouse, in a BBC2 six part comedy series, Mortimer & Whitehouse: Gone Fishing. The two friends, who have both suffered from heart conditions, shared their thoughts and experiences while fishing at a variety of locations around the UK. Six series of the programme have aired to date; a book was released in 2020, series 4 and Christmas specials aired in 2021 and 2023. On 3 February 2019, Mortimer appeared on the BBC Radio programme Desert Island Discs.

On 25 August 2021, Mortimer appeared on episode 116 of the food and comedy podcast Off Menu, hosted by comedians James Acaster and Ed Gamble. In September 2021, Mortimer released an autobiography titled And Away....

Mortimer wrote The Satsuma Complex, a Sunday Times bestselling comic novel published in 2022. An audiobook was released, narrated by Mortimer and Sally Phillips.

In March 2025, Mortimer starred in and won the first series of LOL: Last One Laughing UK. For his performance, he was awarded the British Academy Television Award for Best Entertainment Performance at the 2026 British Academy Television Awards. In August 2025, it was announced he would return to the show as a contestant again for the second series in 2026.

== Personal life ==
Mortimer has suffered from rheumatoid arthritis since childhood; he controls it with steroids.

During his appearance on Desert Island Discs, he revealed that he dealt with crippling shyness until the age of 30, which only began to improve after his initial television success; he also reflected on how his father's early death had shaped his personality, despite not realising how much this event had affected him as a child.

In October 2015, Mortimer underwent triple bypass surgery, which led to the cancellation of the first leg of the Reeves and Mortimer 25 Years tour. On the day of his hospital admission, he married Lisa Matthews, his girlfriend of 22 years, under a special marriage licence express from London. They have two sons.

== Filmography ==
=== With Vic Reeves ===
Year	Title	Channel	Notes
1989	One Hour with Jonathan Ross	Channel 4	TV debut in "Knock Down Ginger" segment
1990–1991	Vic Reeves Big Night Out	Channel 4	
1992	The Weekenders	Channel 4	Pilot
1993	Reeves and Mortimer's Driving School	BBC Two	45 Min. Video
1993–1995	The Smell of Reeves and Mortimer	BBC Two	Sketch show 2 series, 12 episodes
1995–1997, 2002, 2009–2011	Shooting Stars	BBC Two	Broadcast pilot in 1993; 8 series, 72 episodes
1997	It's Ulrika!	BBC Two	One-off special
1999	Bang, Bang, It's Reeves and Mortimer	BBC Two	1 series, 6 episodes
2000–2001	Randall & Hopkirk (Deceased)	BBC One	Acting only 2 series, 13 episodes
2004	Catterick	BBC Three	Sitcom; 1 series, 6 episodes
2004	The All Star Comedy Show	ITV	2-part special
2005	Monkey Trousers	ITV	1 series, 6 episodes
2005	Star Chamber	ITV	Pilot, not commissioned
2014–2015	House of Fools	BBC Two	2 series, 13 episodes
2015	Celebrity Squares	ITV	Guest appearance
2017–2019	Vic and Bob's Big Night Out	BBC Two / BBC Four	One-off special, followed by 2 series. Totalling 9 episodes

=== Television ===
Year	Title	Role	Channel	Notes	Ref
1996	Mash and Peas		Channel 4	In the Seinfeld spoof sketch "I'm Bland... yet all my friends are krazy!"	
1996, 2000, 2008, 2012	Never Mind the Buzzcocks	Guest panellist, guest team captain, guest presenter	BBC Two	Guest panellist in 1996 and 2000. Guest team captain in 2008. Guest presenter in 2012	
2002	The 100 Greatest World Cup Moments of All Time!	Presenter	Channel 4	For the 2002 FIFA World Cup	
2002	Celebrity Boxing for Sport Relief	Contestant	BBC One	Defeated Les Dennis in a charity match	
2005	29 Minutes of Fame	Presenter	BBC One	1 series, 6 episodes	
2005	Popetown	Father Nicholas (voice)	BBC Three	Straight to DVD, the series was not broadcast due to offensive content.	
2005–2007	Tittybangbang		BBC Three	Sketch show Co-creator and co-writer with Jill Parker. Director for series 3	
2010	The 100 Greatest World Cup Moments of All Time!		Channel 4	Updated version for the 2010 FIFA World Cup	
2010	A League of Their Own	Guest panellist			
2012–2026	Would I Lie to You?	Guest panellist	BBC One	Guest panellist 13 appearances, the most of any guest	
2013	Ross Noble Freewheeling	Self	Dave		
2013–2016	Drifters	Frank	E4	Supporting role, 11 episodes	
2013–2019	8 Out Of 10 Cats Does Countdown	Self	Channel 4	8 episodes	
2014	Alan Davies: As Yet Untitled	Guest	Dave		
2014–2016	Duck Quacks Don't Echo	Guest panellist	Sky One	4 appearances	
2015	Let's Play Darts	Contestant	BBC Two	On a team with professional darts player Andy Fordham	
2017	Taskmaster	Contestant	Dave	Series 5 champion Contestant in two-part Champion of Champions special	
2018–present	Mortimer & Whitehouse: Gone Fishing	Self	BBC Two	7 series broadcast	
2019	Travel Man	Self	Channel 4		
2025–2026	LOL: Last One Laughing UK	Self	Amazon Prime Video	Series 1 champion Series 2 contestant	

== Bibliography ==
Year	Title	Type	Ref
2019	Mortimer & Whitehouse: Gone Fishing		
2021	And Away...	Autobiography	
2022	The Satsuma Complex (released as 'The Clementine Complex' in U.S.)	Novel	
2024	The Hotel Avocado	Novel	
2025	The Long Shoe	Novel	
2026	Michael	Novel	

== Discography ==
=== Singles and guest appearances ===
- "Holy Cow" (Jools Holland, with backing vocals credited to Vic & Bob); 1990
- "Summer of '75" (Vic Reeves featuring A Slice of Humble Pie, with co-lead vocals credited to Bob Mortimer); 1991
- "Oh! Mr Hairdresser" (Vic Reeves and The Images of Cream, with mandolin credited to Bob Mortimer); 1991
- "I'm a Believer" (EMF featuring Reeves & Mortimer); 1995 – reached No. 3 on the UK Singles Chart
- "At Least We've Got Our Guitars" (Reeves & Mortimer); 1995
- "At This Stage I Couldn't Say" (Reeves & Mortimer, originally performed as Mulligan & O'Hare); 1995
- "Let's Dance" (Chris Rea with Middlesbrough F.C. and Bob Mortimer); 1997 – reached No. 44 on the UK Singles Chart
- "Personality Recession" (Fabulous featuring Vic Reeves & Bob Mortimer); 2022
- "Slender People" (Bob Mortimer, solo or featuring Chris Whispers); 2025
