= Vic Reeves Big Night Out =

British comedy TV series

- DVD cover, released in September 2005. Left to right: Bob Mortimer, Vic Reeves, Fred Aylward
- Genre: Sketch comedy; Surreal humour
- Created by: Vic Reeves
- Starring: Vic Reeves; Bob Mortimer; Fred Aylward
- No. of series: 2
- No. of episodes: 15

Production
- Running time: 25 minutes (and one 40 minute special)
- Production company: Channel X

Original release
- Network: Channel 4
- Release: 25 May 1990 – 17 April 1991

Related
- The Smell of Reeves and Mortimer; Vic and Bob's Big Night Out (2017–present)

Vic Reeves Big Night Out is a cult British comedy stage show and later television series which ran on Channel 4 for two series in 1990 and 1991, as well as a New Year special. Its live incarnation marked the beginnings of the collaboration between Vic Reeves (real name Jim Moir) and Bob Mortimer and started their Reeves and Mortimer (also known informally as Vic and Bob) comedy double act.

The show was later acknowledged as a seminal force in British comedy throughout the 1990s, the influence of which continued long afterward.

Arguably the most surreal of the pair's work, Vic Reeves Big Night Out was effectively a parody of the variety shows which dominated the early years of television, but which were, by the early 1990s, falling from grace. Vic, introduced by Patrick Allen as "Britain's Top Light Entertainer and Singer", would sit behind a cluttered desk talking nonsense and introducing the various segments and surreal guests on the show. Vic Reeves Big Night Out is notable as the only occasion in their career in which Vic took the role of sole host, while Bob was consigned to the back stage, appearing every few minutes as either himself or as a strange character. The two received equal billing in the series credits.

Both series of the show and the 1990 New Year's Eve special are currently available for viewing on Channel 4's streaming service, All 4.

== History ==
In the mid-1980s, a friend of Jim Moir gave him the job of running a comedy club in London. Not knowing how to book acts, he decided to put on a show of his own, changing his name every night, but eventually sticking with 'Vic Reeves' and calling the show Vic Reeves' Variety Palladium. In 1986, he moved the show to the Goldsmiths Tavern (now the New Cross House) in New Cross, and renamed it Vic Reeves' Big Night Out.

The first shows were attended by a few friends whom Moir had invited to see his performance, one of whom brought solicitor Bob Mortimer along with him. Mortimer soon became friendly with Moir, and was invited on the stage to talk about his day at work. He soon became a regular fixture in the show and began to write material with Moir. Through word of mouth, the audience quickly grew to a large number of devotees, including Jools Holland, Jonathan Ross, Charlie Higson, and Paul Whitehouse. After the crowd expansion led to a change of venue to the Albany Empire theatre in 1988, backstage man Fred Aylward joined as the regular character Les. Higson and Whitehouse also had bit parts.

The show sparked the interest of Alan Yentob of the BBC, and Michael Grade of Channel 4, and eventually a deal was struck with Channel 4 to put the live show on television. With the help of Jonathan Ross' production company Channel X, a pilot was produced in 1989 (available to watch on YouTube) where the three-hour show was cut down to 25 minutes.

The first series was broadcast in 1990. With the 1990 New Year's Eve Big Night Out special, and the second series in 1991, the programme totalled 15 episodes followed by a televised broadcast of the stage show, Big Night Out Tour. Vic and Bob's next television project was The Weekenders.

On 3 October 2007, the first episode was re-broadcast on More4 as part of Channel 4 at 25, a season of classic Channel 4 programmes shown to celebrate the channel's 25th birthday.

On 25 October 2009, repeats of Big Night Out began running on TV channel Gold.

== Recurring characters ==
The series spawned numerous characters.

=== Les ===
Played by Fred Aylward, Les was Vic's bald-headed, dribbling, mute, lab coat-wearing assistant. During each show, Vic would reveal a new fact about Les - most notably, that he cannot help but raise a smile whenever he sees a spirit level and that he has a terrible fear of chives (later revealed not to be a fear of the chives themselves but the soil in which they grow). It would later be revealed that he has an internal wife called Pat, can self-reproduce throughout the summer months, collects stickers from car parks, was formerly the lead singer in the pop group Japan, has a pet jellyfish called Peter and plays the Bontempi organ. Les also had a fixation with mangoes and was later accompanied by a sycophantic little robot called Dylan. He is introduced as Les Dixon in one episode.

=== The Man With The Stick ===
The Man with the Stick is a man (played by Bob Mortimer, except in a few scenes where he appears alongside one of Mortimer's other characters) dressed in a large paper helmet which covers his face. He also wields a long stick, the end of which holds an object obscured by a bag. At the point when the Man with the Stick appears, Vic shouts, "What do we cry when we see the man with the stick?" to which the audience replies, "What's on the end of the stick, Vic?" Vic would ask him if he is going to reveal what he has on the end of his stick; usually the Man With The Stick refuses - but did occasionally reveal it.

The Man with the Stick would come out each week to a fanfare, and then proceed to talk casually with Vic about a number of drawings on his paper helmet. The helmet "graffiti" would act as a pictorial guide to what he'd been investigating during that week such as "A lamppost which has been disconnected to provide electricity for the Farnborough Air Show" and pop group "Spandau Ballet laughing at an orphan who has fallen off his bike". If the item on the end of the stick was revealed, this was usually done at the end of the programme.

Over the course of the second series, it is revealed that The Man with the Stick has sold his children to Vic, and since they are still under contract, he is unable to get them back. Vic uses them as a means to various ends, such as trading them for a car, signing them up to the territorial army and selling their souls to the devil. This gradually plunges the Man with the Stick into a terrible depression. At the end of the final episode, he drunkenly storms the stage brandishing a gun, and shoots Vic, Graham Lister and finally himself (although all three would later return unharmed on the Big Night Out Tour).

The Man with the Stick often mentioned his best friend Terry, who invariably subjected him to some horrible experience or humiliation, much to his blissful unawareness and evident glee. He reappears in Vic and Bob's Big Night Out, where his helmet is now covered in silver foil because he is living 40 years in the future and has time-travelled back to visit the present day.

=== Graham Lister ===
Played by Bob in a black curly wig, brown mac and horn-rimmed glasses, Graham Lister is described as an acquaintance and admirer of "doctors, dentists and architects". He is Vic's arch-rival and sour-lipped foil who each week would enter the "Novelty Island" segment of the show with increasingly pathetic acts. He would then share a heated argument with Vic (whom he regularly referred to as "The Fop"). Arguably his most memorable act was "Lard for Laughs" where he dropped lard onto a pile of salt, then pushed a block of lard through a breakfast cereal packet with the face of "pop star" Mickey Rourke on it. Lister would eventually win the contest with the 'act' of presenting a 'Refreshing cool jug of orange juice" but still kept returning to feature on the show. He would eventually become so popular that by the second series sections of the audience would unprompted chant his name whenever he appeared. In the final episode Lister was forced by Vic to admit he is a "talentless, worthless, embittered sex criminal".

=== Mr. Dennis ===
Played by Vic, Mr. Dennis is a jumper-wearing, rather dull but highly strung newsagent and tobacconist, who doesn't stock Curly Wurlys as "they are far too elaborate" but does sell sweet cigarettes and occasionally slips in a real one as a "treat for the children". He is in cahoots with Lister, and they are both the co-founders of a consumer-product safety and hygiene standards group, NIPS (Neighbourhood Inspectorate of Product Standards). Mr. Dennis gets easily riled and at one point goes on a violent rampage around the set, punching Les and knocking Lister out. He is married to an unseen wife with various intestinal problems, is a fan of the sitcom Fresh Fields and dabbles in being a music promoter, managing several successful indie pop groups.

=== Judge Nutmeg ===
Played by Bob - wearing Lister's wig inside out - Judge Lionel Nutmeg would preside over "That's Justice", a game which involved a member of the audience being tried for a random and nonsensical crime. The punishment is decided by spinning the hairy Wheel of Justice, whilst singing "spin, spin, spin the wheel of justice, see how fast the bastard turns". Vic would then move the wheel until it landed on the punishment he liked the most, making the wheel a useless means of choosing a punishment. A recurring gag was Nutmeg commenting at the end of the show that Vic was both unfunny and untalented and suggesting he seek alternative employment, much to his distress.

=== The Aromatherapists ===
Dr. Richard Slater and Dr. Richard Slater (Vic and Bob), who "smell to get well" and prescribe different smells in order to cure weird illnesses. Although it is thought that they are not related, both of them wear white jumpsuits, have identical "Titian" hair, speak in the same manner and have the same name.

=== Morrissey, The Consumer Monkey ===
A monkey puppet with the face of Morrissey, with a balloon for a mouth operated by Vic and voiced by Bob. Morrissey the Consumer Monkey would often come on to give advice on shoddy or unsafe consumer goods. Usually these items were manufactured and sold by Reeves & Mortimer Products, and the pair would be forced to make a hasty cover-up. He had a theme song, sung in duet with Vic, which began with Morrissey claiming, "I like watches, I like woods" and Vic countering with, "He likes various consumer goods."

=== The Stotts ===
Played by Vic and Bob, the Stotts are redundant, jittery, bickering brothers from Shildon with black insulation tape moustaches, poorly applied bald-wigs, big silly clown shoes and high-pitched voices. Davey (Vic) wears a kilt. Donald (Bob) is the slightly more sensible one, in a grey leather jacket, but he is prone to "antique incidents". The pair are also frequently startled. They have many talents including presenting talk shows (interviewing each other), game shows (including party games such as "Pass the Fat," "Read the Anthony Trollope Novel" and "Guess What's On Les's Back") and doing magic shows. Usually however, they just give up and leave the set before their spot is supposed to finish.

The Stotts were one of the very few characters from Vic Reeves Big Night Out to return in later Reeves & Mortimer series. They appeared in the second series of The Smell of Reeves and Mortimer and Bang Bang, It's Reeves and Mortimer as talk show hosts again, often interviewing celebrities such as Sting and Damon Hill.

=== Tinker's Rucksack ===
A pair of genial, bearded, anorak-wearing ramblers (Vic and Bob) who tell amusing anecdotes and share their knowledge of the world of rambling with the audience, constantly assuring them that "it's not all walking." One (Bob) is clearly having an affair with the other's wife, Mary.

=== Greg Mitchell ===
Greg Mitchell, the "gorgeous sandy-coloured labrador", was a puppet dog with a completely naïve understanding of the world. He would often talk about something he had just done, in a high-pitched and rather fey voice. He would, however, suddenly realise that he hadn't thought it through and drop into a guttural Cockney bellow, shouting "my wife's gonna KILL me!!!" Greg would also reappear in The Smell of Reeves and Mortimer.

=== The Living Carpets ===
Played by Vic and Bob wearing masks made of carpet swatches. They would sit in Les's Lunch Club and make increasingly outrageous claims, such as being responsible for "colouring in the black bits on Friesian cows with a special Biro", or "filling in the coloured bits in pilau rice" before accusing each other of being a "lying get", or one exclaiming "I heard that rumour" with the other responding "I know, I started it". While this is going on, Les would serve both of them tea whilst genteel music played in the background. It would later be revealed that they are both the character of Parker from the children's puppet show Thunderbirds, who is actually Les' father (his 'mother' is Glaxo Industries).

On the Vic Reeves Big Night Out Tour, the Living Carpets were played by two "imposters", but were voiced by Vic and Bob who were stood backstage and would enter the stage at the end of the act of kick the "imposters" off stage.

=== The Ponderers ===
Appearing in series two, Vic and Bob's Swiss counterparts who wear only their underpants, white perms and very large fake chins - complete with the elastic holding them in place. Each week they would be seen on their own parallel Swiss Night Out pondering over a specific decision (for instance, whether or not to inject ink into a battenberg cake), whilst thoughtfully rubbing their chins. The use of Swiss as a descriptor continued in other projects for the character Swiss Toni.

=== Wavey Davey ===
A simple, childlike, naïve man who waves at people, things and celebrities, in an increasingly malevolent way. He is later revealed to be Satan. Played by Bob.

=== Talc & Turnips ===
Two men (Vic and Bob) who came on in ridiculous leotards, silly wigs and big false teeth, wielding bits of wood, buckets, hoops with tomatoes attached to them and big placards announcing such things as "Squirrel in bucket of hot trout = racial harmony." The pair would just crash and fall around the place, being ridiculously clumsy and not making it at all clear what "point" they were supposed to be making. By the end of their "performance" the set would be in disarray and Les would have to clean up very quickly. While these characters baffled the audience and even the show's producers, Reeves and Mortimer believe they were the best characters on the show.

=== Action! Image! Exchange! ===
Vic and Bob's performance art group, who perform "The Facelessness of Bureaucracy". They put on Sean Connery or Jimmy Hill masks, one wields either talcum powder or a beehive and the other a pair of swimming trunks or a bra, and enact a little dance to some traditional jazz punctuated by the sound of a breeze, to illustrate "a pensioner being attacked by some police officers", etc.

== Recurring segments ==
=== Novelty Island ===
"Novelty Island" is a bizarre parody of talent shows like New Faces, with Vic acting as host. The so-called Acts Of Tomorrow showcase their various ridiculous talents from the centre of a small paddock, complete with a white picket fence with a gate. Generally, there are three acts, one of which is inevitably Graham Lister, and Vic makes no effort to hide his disgust at Lister's turns. Novelty Island also sees such memorable characters as Mr Wobbly Hand, Judith Grant, the Slitherer, the Hoxton Hockler, Mr Melon in the wind and Wavy Davey.

The Liverpool-based band Novelty Island named themselves after the sketch.

=== That's Justice ===
After a devilish build-up by Vic, Judge Nutmeg wheels on to the stage in a mobile bench, and Vic hauls a random member of the audience on stage to try them for a set of ridiculous trumped-up charges, such as "staring at a fixed point, causing terrible dryness" or "wringing out a flannel in a branch of Thomas Cook, one of the most respected travel agents on the high street!". When the accused is inevitably found guilty, Vic spins the Wheel of Justice - after combing its hair - and the audience sing "Spin, spin, spin the Wheel of Justice, see how fast the bastard turns". An equally ludicrous punishment is then handed down (e.g. "One year being adored by the cast of Jesus Christ Superstar"). For one memorable week, Judge Nutmeg changed the format of the show and tried for a more liberal approach; the Wheel of Conciliation, where he tried to solve the marital problems of a 'separated' couple from the audience, who, incidentally, had never met before.

=== Reeves and Mortimer Products ===
Throughout the show Vic and Bob attempt to plug their own brands of inevitably flawed and substandard products. These are often exposed by Morrissey the Consumer Monkey and when they attempt to launch their own line of meat products they are countered by Graham Lister with his 'Lister's Luxury Meats'.

=== Closing song ===
The show always ends with Vic singing the song 'Mr Songwriter' although this is occasionally hijacked by other characters such as Bob or Graham Lister and, at the end of the first season, is performed as a rock and roll number.

== Big Night Out reunion gig ==
A one-off reunion show of the Big Night Out was performed in 2005 at the old Raymond Revuebar, now the Too2Much club, in London. It was filmed by Channel X, although there has been no news of what will happen to this recording. There is no sign that this will lead to a fully-fledged reunion tour though if it is a success then that may change. Vic has mentioned that he would like to do more live work, and that the return of the Big Night Out live is not out of the question.

== Home release ==
The series was released onto VHS by PolyGram Video in 1991, with each tape consisting of three episodes.

A complete series DVD release was released by Channel 4 DVD in 2005, although it doesn't contain the 1990 New Year's Eve Special. Despite the increased BBFC 15 rating (from the original PG rating), the pre-watershed versions are used on this release that remove profanity. The DVD set is infamous by fans for its heavy edits applied to remove the advert break boards, which would break some of the visual gags.

== Vic and Bob's Big Night Out ==
A new BBC version of the series, Vic and Bob's Big Night Out, started airing in December 2017, with a pilot episode followed by two series of four episodes each.
