= Catterick (TV series) =

British TV comedy series (2004)

- DVD cover of Catterick, with Bob Mortimer as Carl Palmer and Vic Reeves as Chris Palmer
- Genre: Sitcom; Absurdist comedy; Black comedy; Crime comedy
- Created by: Vic Reeves; Bob Mortimer
- Written by: Vic Reeves; Bob Mortimer
- Starring: Vic Reeves; Bob Mortimer; Matt Lucas; Reece Shearsmith; Morwenna Banks; Mark Benton; Tim Healy; Charlie Higson
- Country of origin: United Kingdom
- No. of series: 1
- No. of episodes: 6

Production
- Producer: Pett Productions
- Running time: 30 minutes

Original release
- Network: BBC Three/BBC Two
- Release: 15 February – 21 March 2004

Catterick, aka Vic and Bob in Catterick, is a surreal 2004 BBC situation comedy in 6 episodes, written by and starring Vic Reeves and Bob Mortimer, with Reece Shearsmith, Matt Lucas, Morwenna Banks, Tim Healy, Mark Benton and Charlie Higson. The series was originally broadcast on BBC Three and later rerun on BBC Two. Reeves has said that the BBC do not want another series of Catterick, though he may produce a spin-off centring on the DI Fowler character.

The series is named after Catterick in North Yorkshire, a village which gives it name to the nearby Catterick Garrison, Britain's largest army base. It is about 10 miles away from Darlington, where Reeves grew up, and about 20 miles away from Middlesbrough, where Mortimer grew up.

== Character histories ==
Carl Palmer: Played by Bob Mortimer, Carl is an ex-soldier and has returned home from service in Cyprus. He left because his ex-wife Judy was, according to his brother Chris, "having sly love with a midnight creeper." He never makes it clear what went on in Cyprus. He wants to become reacquainted with his long-lost son, Paul, whom he abandoned when he was just four years old. He becomes attracted to Tess, the receptionist at the Mermade Hotel, when he and Chris go there to stay for a few days.

Chris Palmer: Played by Vic Reeves, Chris is Carl's younger brother, and has a big woolly beard. He lives alone in their late mother's house, with only a turkey in a box for company. He had a George Clooney poster, but he ripped it in half, much to Carl's disgust. Chris does not get out much and has a habit of staring at people for no apparent reason. He has a one-man show called "Dreams of Parsimony" which involves him playing flute while climbing onto a chair. He also has a boomerang hidden somewhere, which he is desperate to find. His biggest ambition is to own "luxury pets" such as "a soft white poodle, a lobster, a venison and a silkworm." He has always wanted to stay at the Mermade (sic) Hotel, which is why he and Carl end up stealing Tony's car.

DI Keith Fowler: The intrepid "American Eagle," played by Vic, DI Fowler is the determined police inspector who is finally living his dream of working for the NYPD (North Yorkshire Police Department). Certain things confuse him, however, such as the not-inconsiderable difference between a Volkswagen Golf and a Range Rover. He also mispronounces words such as "Tupperware" and "Lager", much to the confusion of everyone around. He believes the killer of Neil Wheel to be "a loose cannon... a tithead." Along with his permanently baffled partner Webster (Matt Lucas), he enjoys a night on ecstasy in order to become a "oneness" with the suspect. He gets shot by Tony but survives and regales the nurses in his hospital of how he "blew the lid off Tony Falucci's hydraulics scam!"

Roy Oates: Played by Matt Lucas, Roy Oates is the manager of the Mermade Hotel. He is a very bad-tempered man with a strange, indeterminate accent and a ponytail. He has a habit of wearing ridiculous pink boots and constantly puts his feet up on tables and chairs to appear imposing. He is blackmailing the hotel's dogsbody, Mark, with incriminating photos. He has a girlfriend, Tess, who does not really like him very much. He holds one great secret. His penis was chopped off in an incident with the hotel till, and he keeps it in a jar. He hopes to raise enough money to go to Switzerland to have an operation, but the penis gets stolen along with the contents of his safe. Later, he also gets his hand chopped off by a curved blade.

Tess: Played by Morwenna Banks, Tess is the long-suffering receptionist at the Mermade Hotel. She is also Roy Oates' reluctant girlfriend. She claims that before he had his "accident" he was great fun ("he even introduced me to a barrister,"). She is drawn to Carl, but is not willing to commit. She is addicted to the "gas" from an asthma inhaler, which induces an extremely brief spell of euphoria. She never believes anything anyone says, usually offering a reply along the lines of "You're tickling my turnips" or "You're feeling my fanny."

Tony: Played by Reece Shearsmith, Tony is a dangerous, psychotic armed robber who robs "Neil's Wheels" used car dealership and shoots the owner, Mr Neil Wheel. He is obsessed with keeping his mouth clean, drinking mouthwash and flossing his teeth. His Range Rover car, which contains a briefcase full of the stolen money, is eventually stolen by Chris and Carl, which provokes Tony to try to track them down and kill them. However, he is dominated by his mother, and he has to placate her before he can go on the rampage. By the end of the series, he is killed in a caravan explosion and it turns out that Tony is in fact Carl's long-lost son, Paul Anthony, at which point he is supposed to be dead but it is implied he survived the explosion.

Mark: Played by Mark Benton, Mark is the Mermade Hotel's dogsbody. He is an amiable, mulleted and innocent sort of person. However, his time at the Mermade is miserable. He is a slave to Mr Oates, the hotel manager. After Mark caused an enormous accident at the annual flotilla the previous year, by bathing semi-clad on the rocks and being mistaken for a "sensual woman." Oates captured him on camera and threatens to send the pictures to the press if Mark steps out of line. Mark also runs the Mermade Hotel's jazz-fusion disco night. He eventually helps Chris and Carl escape from the clutches of Tony and leaves the hotel.

Dan, Dan The Shellfish Man: Played by Matt Lucas, Dan is a very enthusiastic Cockney shellfish retailer, who specialises in cockles, whelks, winkles and crabsticks. He is, according to Chris, "a nosy git" and helps Carl out in his search for his son. Dan is the only man who knows where Chris' boomerang is.

Ian: Played by Tim Healy, Ian is one of the regulars in the Siberian Khatru pub in Northallerton. He is very talkative and likes sharing his bizarre stories with anyone within earshot. He very nearly joined a black rock-funk band, "sort of like Osibisa" but decided to stay home and look after his wife, who is freezing cold to the touch and has to be constantly kept warm with electric heaters. Ian finally comes to the realization that his wife has been dead for 9 months, but believes that it could have been the journey to the hospital that truly finished her off. It is unknown how his wife died but at the end, he has been arrested, either due to him keeping her corpse for 9 months or having something to do with her death.

Pat The Barman: Played by Charlie Higson, Pat is the grumpy barman of the Siberian Khatru. He is constantly trying to serve his own brand of van-flattened Spatchcock.

=== Minor characters ===
Derek (Fanny Fresh Man): Played by Bob, this scraggly-haired vagrant is run over by a cross-eyed woman and is strangely attracted to her "Fanny Fresh," which is "prat spray." He is also addicted to "gas" from asthma inhalers. He also seems to have commandeered the local "Pick Your Own" fruit reserve. He is not an American actor. He also spontaneously bursts in on Tess' forest cabin, on his endless quest for "Fanny Fresh!".

Sergeant Minge-Munchington: (Steve Furst) one of DI Fowler's hapless officers.

Tony's Mum: Tony's mother (Julie T. Wallace) is very concerned about her son's behaviour, but is more than willing to give him what for if he steps out of line.

Glen: (Frank Jarvis) Another one of the regulars at the Siberian Khatru, Glen never says a word, remains in his wheelchair, and always has a look of shock and awe on his face. He does get excited, however, at the prospect of crabsticks.

== Songs ==
The varied soundtrack featured original music, with Jeff Beck on guitar, and was idiosyncratic in its use of popular music. As well as using songs to punctuate important moments in the plot, or to add surreality – such as the use of "Kinky Boots" by Patrick Macnee and Honor Blackman for many of Roy Oates' entrances – once an episode, characters would begin spontaneously lip-synching to songs. These were:

- "Working on It" by Chris Rea (lip-synched by Mark)
- "Satan Rejected My Soul" by Morrissey (Tony)
- "The Sire of Sorrow (Job's Sad Song)" by Joni Mitchell (Tess)
- "Miss You" by Flanagan and Allen (sung by DI Fowler)
- "Hot on the Heels of Heartbreak" by The Beautiful South (Tess and Carl)
- "Only My Soul" by Free (Chris and Cast)

The theme tune from Reeves and Mortimer's short-lived BBC One gameshow, Families at War, can be heard playing at Mark's disco featured in the second episode of the series.

== Hidden prog-rock references ==
- Carl Palmer, Bob Mortimer's main character is (probably) named after the Emerson, Lake & Palmer drummer
- In the opening episode, an elderly man graffitis a bus window with the name Ginger Baker (Cream drummer)
- The pub, run by Charlie Higson's character, called Siberian Khatru, is named after a song by the band Yes
- Another prog-rock link is the use in Episode 1 of part of a song introduction by the US retro-prog rock band Spock's Beard from their album Snow.
- Chris Palmer's physical appearance closely resembles Jeff Lynne of The Move and Electric Light Orchestra.
- The character Mark wears a City Boy t-shirt in one episode, a minor UK prog band.

The British Prog-rock group Crippled Black Phoenix sampled Reeves' character DI Fowler in the song "Laying Traps" on the 2012 album (Mankind) The Crafty Ape.
