= Criminal (disambiguation) =

A criminal is a person who commits a crime.

Criminal or The Criminal may also refer to:

== Film and television ==
- The Criminal (1916 film), an American film of 1916
- The Criminal (1926 film), a French silent film
- The Criminal (1960 film), a British film
- The Criminals (1959 film), a British television play
- The Criminals (1962 film), an Australian TV movie, filmed previously in 1959
- Criminal, a 1994 British television film in the Screen Two anthology series
- Criminal (1994 film), a Telugu and Hindi film starring Nagarjuna, directed by Mahesh Bhatt
- The Criminal (1999 film), a British film
- Criminal (2004 film), an American film starring John C. Reilly based upon the Argentine film Nine Queens
- Criminal (2005 film), a 2005 Bengali film
- Criminal (2016 film), an American film starring Kevin Costner
- Criminal (franchise), a 2019 pan-European crime anthology series, consisting of separate sub-series
  - Criminal: UK
  - Criminal: France
  - Criminal: Spain
  - Criminal: Germany
- Criminal (TV series)

== Music ==
- Criminal (band), a Chilean-English thrash/death metal group
- The Criminals (band), an American punk rock band
- Criminal (album), a 2018 album by the Soft Moon

=== Songs ===
- "Criminal" (Britney Spears song), 2011
- "Criminal" (Fiona Apple song), 1997
- "Criminal" (Lindsay Ell song), 2017
- "Criminal" (Natti Natasha and Ozuna song), 2017
- "Criminal" (Taemin song), 2020
- "Criminal", by Disturbed from Indestructible
- "Criminal", by Eminem from The Marshall Mathers LP
- "Criminal", by Gwen Stefani, an unreleased song
- "Criminal", by Lower Than Atlantis from Changing Tune
- "Criminal", by Manafest from The Moment
- "Criminal", by Miguel from War & Leisure
- "Criminal", by Stand Atlantic from Was Here
- "Criminal", by State Champs from Living Proof
- "Criminal", from the Ra.One film soundtrack
- "Criminal", by ZZ Ward from Til the Casket Drops

== Other uses ==
- Criminal (comics), a crime comic book by writer Ed Brubaker and artist Sean Phillips
- Kriminal, an Italian comics character
- Criminal (podcast), a podcast on true crime hosted by Phoebe Judge
- The Criminal (novel), a 1953 novel by Jim Thompson
- The Criminal (Havelock Ellis), a 1890 book by Havelock Ellis

== See also ==
- Convict
- Parolee
- Prisoner
- Ex-convict
- Criminal law, the body of statutory and common law that deals with crime and the legal punishment of criminal offences
- Criminals (disambiguation)
- Crime (disambiguation)
- Criminal Mind (disambiguation)
- Convict (disambiguation)
- Prisoner (disambiguation)
