= Idiotlamp Productions =

English independent production company

Idiotlamp Productions is an independent production company based in London, England, founded by Jim Field Smith and George Kay.

== Credits ==
Idiotlamp is the creative entity behind the multinational Netflix series Criminal, comprising the four miniseries Criminal: UK, Criminal: Spain, Criminal: France, and Criminal: Germany. Prior to that, the company produced Stag for the BBC. Idiotlamp was also behind the short films Where Have I Been All Your Life (2007), Goodbye to the Normals (2006), and Missing Moscow, as well as the mini-documentary series My Friend... for Channel 4.
