= Criminals (disambiguation) =

Criminals are people who commit crime.

Criminals or The Criminals may also refer to:

- The Criminals (band), an American punk rock band
- The Criminals, an earlier punk band led by Syl Sylvain
- The Criminals (1959 film), a British television play
- The Criminals (1962 film), an Australian TV movie, filmed previously in 1959e
- Criminals (film), a 1975 Indian Malayalam film
- "Criminals" (DMA's song), 2020
- "Criminals" (Meghan Trainor song), 2024
- "Criminals", by David Cook from the 2015 album Digital Vein

== See also ==
- Criminal (disambiguation)
- Crime (disambiguation)
