= Criminal: Spain =

2019 Spanish-language television series

- Genre: Police procedural anthology series
- Created by: George Kay; Jim Field Smith
- Written by: Alejandro Hernández; Manuel Martín Cuenca
- Directed by: Mariano Barroso
- Starring: Emma Suárez; Jorge Bosch; Álvaro Cervantes
- Country of origin: Spain
- Original language: Spanish
- No. of seasons: 1
- No. of episodes: 3

Production
- Running time: 39–41 minutes
- Production company: Idiotlamp Productions

Original release
- Network: Netflix
- Release: 20 September 2019

Related
- Criminal: France; Criminal: Germany; Criminal: UK

Criminal: Spain is a 2019 Spanish-language police procedural anthology series created by George Kay and Jim Field Smith and starring Emma Suárez, Carmen Machi and Álvaro Cervantes. Criminal: Spain is part of Netflix's Criminal, an anthology series consisting of twelve episodes with three episodes each set across four countries filmed in local languages – France, Spain, Germany and the UK.

It was released on 20 September 2019 on Netflix.

== Premise ==
Set within the confines of a police interrogation room, Spanish investigators engage in intense games of psychological cat-and-mouse with their accused suspects to find the answers they need in order to solve their cases.

== Cast ==
=== Accused ===
- Carmen Machi - Isabel Ferradas Pérez
- Inma Cuesta - Carmen
- Eduard Fernández - Carmelo Al Huzaini

=== Police ===
- José Ángel Egido - Commissioner (Comisario) Joaquin Manero Alted
- Emma Suárez - Chief Inspector (Inspectora Jefe) María de los Ángeles Toranzo Puig
- Jorge Bosch - Inspector (Inspector) Carlos Cerdeño Varona
- María Morales - Inspector (Inspectora) Luisa
- Álvaro Cervantes - Sub Inspector (Subinspector) Raimundo Messeguer Ortiz
- Daniel Chamorro - Officer (Oficial de Policía) Jorge
- Milo Taboada - Officer (Oficial de Policía) Leo

=== Lawyers ===
- Nuria Mencía - Clara
- Javi Coll - Carmen's lawyer

== Episodes ==
No.	Title	Directed by	Written by	Original release date
1	"Isabel"	Mariano Barroso	Alejandro Hernández	20 September 2019
Investigators bring in world champion dog breeder Isabel to question her about her involvement in the disappearance and possible murder of her recent romantic companion.
2	"Carmen"	Mariano Barroso	Manuel Martín Cuenca	20 September 2019
Investigators interrogate Carmen, whose younger autistic sister unexpectedly drowns in the bathtub, but they quickly begin to suspect that she could be hiding something about her sister's sudden death.
3	"Carmelo"	Mariano Barroso	Alejandro Hernández	20 September 2019
Notorious drug dealer Carmelo Al Huzaini is brought in by investigators on cocaine possession and is interrogated about sharing a possible connection to a recent terrorist attack. All the while, Al Huzaini shares personal history with one of the investigators.

== Production ==
All twelve episodes will film at Netflix's production hub at Ciudad de la Tele in Madrid.

== Release ==
Criminal: Spain was released on 20 September 2019 on Netflix.
