= Crime (disambiguation) =

A crime is an act that violates the law, though the word sometimes describes anti-social behaviors outside of a legal context.

Crime, Crimes, or The Crime may also refer to:

== Geography ==
- Crime Lake, a lake in Greater Manchester, England

== Books ==
- The Crime Book, by Cathy Scott, Shanna Hogan, Rebecca Morris, Lee Mellor, and Michael Kerrigan, 2017
- Crime (novel), by Irvine Welsh, 2008
- The Crime (Mahfouz book), 1973
- The Crime (novel) (French: Un crime), by Georges Bernanos, 1935

== Films and television shows ==
- The Crime (film), a 2022 Egyptian film
- A Crime, a thriller film directed by Manuel Pradal (2006)
- "Crime" (Brass Eye), a 1997 television episode
- "The Crime", an episode of Your Favorite Story (1954)
- Crime (TV series), a 2021 TV series by BritBox based on the 2008 novel by Irvine Welsh

== Music ==
- Crime (band), an early punk rock band from the U.S. city of San Francisco, California
- Crim3s, a witch house duo from London
- Crimes (album), an album by the post-hardcore band The Blood Brothers
- "Crime", a song by Stina Nordenstam from the 1994 album And She Closed Her Eyes
- "The Crime", a b-side on the 12" version of the Prince single "Scandalous!"
- "Crimes", a song by Xentrix from the 1989 album Shattered Existence

== Acronyms ==
- CRIME, a security exploit against the HTTPS protocol

== Television channels ==
- Crime (TV channel), an Australian television channel
- Fox Crime
- RTL Crime, different European TV channels

== See also ==
- Criminal (disambiguation)
- Crime fiction, the fictional treatment of crimes and their detection and criminals and their motives
- Legal Crime, a 1997 video game by Byte Enchanters
