= Hijack (TV series) =

Thriller television series

- Genre: Thriller
- Created by: George Kay; Jim Field Smith
- Starring: Idris Elba; Neil Maskell; Christine Adams; Max Beesley; Ben Miles; Kate Phillips; Jasper Britton; Jack McMullen; Aimée Kelly; Mohamed Elsandel; Archie Panjabi; Eve Myles; Hattie Morahan; Christian Näthe; Clare-Hope Ashitey; Lisa Vicari; Karima McAdams; Jasmine Bayes; Toby Jones; Christiane Paul
- Theme music composer: UNKLE; Richard Ashcroft; Wil Malone
- Countries of origin: United Kingdom; United States
- Original languages: English; German
- No. of series: 2
- No. of episodes: 15

Production
- Executive producers: Idris Elba; George Kay; Jim Field Smith; Kris Thykier; Hakan Kousetta; Jamie Laurenson; Tom Nash
- Running time: 39–56 minutes
- Production companies: 60Forty Films; Green Door Pictures; Idiotlamp Productions; Archery Pictures

Original release
- Network: Apple TV+
- Release: 28 June – 2 August 2023
- Network: Apple TV
- Release: 14 January 2026 – present

Hijack (stylised as H/JACK) is a thriller television series created by George Kay and Jim Field Smith, with Idris Elba starring in the lead role. It premiered on 28 June 2023 on Apple TV+. In January 2024, it was renewed for a second series, which premiered on 14 January 2026.

== Premise ==
Sam, a business negotiator, must use his skills to broker a peaceful end to a hijacking of a seven-hour flight from Dubai to London.

== Cast and characters ==
=== Main ===
- Idris Elba as Sam Nelson, a lawyer and corporate business negotiator
- Neil Maskell as Stuart Atterton / Gerald Taylor, Lewis' elder brother and the leader of the hijackers
- Christine Adams as Marsha Smith-Nelson, Sam's estranged wife, a physics professor
- Max Beesley as DI Daniel O'Farrell, Marsha's boyfriend, a Metropolitan Police officer
- Archie Panjabi as DCI Zahra Gahfoor, O'Farrell's former partner and a member of SO15
- Ian Burfield as John Bailey-Brown (series 2; guest, series 1), a co-leader of the Cheapside Firm crime syndicate and the hijacking orchestrator of Kingdom Airlines Flight 29

==== Series 1 ====
- Ben Miles as Captain Robin Allen, the pilot of Kingdom Airlines Flight 29
- Kaisa Hammarlund as First Officer Anna Kovacs, the co-pilot of Kingdom Airlines Flight 29
- Zora Bishop as Deevia Khan, the lead flight attendant
- Jeremy Ang Jones as Arthur, a flight attendant
- Kate Phillips as Collette Fisher, a flight attendant who is having an affair with Robin
- Jasper Britton as Terry Reid / Marcus Sutton, one of the hijackers
- Jack McMullen as Lewis Atterton / Ryan Cunningham, Stuart's younger brother and one of the hijackers
- Aimée Kelly as Jamie Constantinou / Bella Cunningham, one of the hijackers
- Mohamed Elsandel as Jaden Dahir / Alexander Kier, one of the hijackers
- Eve Myles as Alice Sinclair, an air traffic controller
- Hattie Morahan as Louise Aitchison, the British Foreign Secretary
- Neil Stuke as Neil Walsh, the British Home Secretary
- Simon McBurney as Edgar Janssen, a co-leader of the Cheapside Firm crime syndicate

==== Series 2 ====
- Albrecht Schuch as Freddie von Neuenfels, a train passenger and sustainability consultant
- Christian Näthe as Otto Weber, a train driver for the Berlin U-Bahn
- Clare-Hope Ashitey as Olivia Thatcher, an employee at the British Embassy in Berlin
- Lisa Vicari as Clara Berger, a train dispatcher at the U-Bahn
- Dejan Bućin as Detective Zoran Beck, a high-ranking BKA agent
- Karima McAdams as Jess / Mona Hakani, a train passenger and volunteer medic
- Jasmine Bayes as Mei Tan, a train passenger; Sam's former intern
- Toby Jones as Peter Faber, a senior British Intelligence official
- Christiane Paul as Chief Ada Winter, head of the Federal Police, Berlin Division
- Christian Berkel as Deputy Chief Roland Murnau, Winter's second-in-command
- Arsher Ali as Robert Lang, an MI5 operative and former soldier working with Faber

=== Recurring ===
==== Series 1 ====
- Justin Salinger as Alec, a plane passenger
- Holly Aird as Amanda, a plane passenger
- Nasser Memarzia as Yussuf, a plane passenger
- Gretchen Egolf as Adelaide, a plane passenger
- Fatima Adoum as Rashida, a first-class plane passenger
- Harry Michell as Hugo, a plane passenger who sits next to Sam
- Richard Hope as Phillip Paxton, a plane passenger; Anglican priest and Claire's husband
- Julia Deakin as Claire Paxton, a plane passenger; Phillip's wife
- Jack Parry-Jones as Kelvin, a plane passenger
- Nebras Jamali as Nasir, a plane passenger
- Mei Henri as Naomi, a teenage plane passenger
- Chantelle Alle as Kacey, a teenage plane passenger
- James Burrows as Jonty, a plane passenger with a criminal history
- Marcus Garvey as David Miller, a plane passenger; Kate's husband
- Rochenda Sandall as Kate Miller, a plane passenger; David's wife
- Liz Kingsman as Sheena, a plane passenger
- Antonia Salib as Leesha, a first-class plane passenger
- Jude Cudjoe as Kai, Sam and Marsha's teenage son
- Alex Macqueen as Tindall, a British government official
- Kevin Eldon as Devlin, a mysterious businessman

==== Series 2 ====
- Thomas Kitsche as Timo Dönitz, a train passenger and father of a sick baby
- Ellie McKay as Orla, a train passenger
- Sasha Carberry Sharma as Fran, a train passenger
- Eysteinn Sigurðarson as Anders, a train passenger
- Matt Mordak as Pavel, a train passenger
- Gabrielle Scharnitzky as Petra, a train passenger
- Herbert Forthuber as Stefan, a train passenger
- Jessica Hardwick as Mansell, Marsha's neighbour
- Jamie Michie as Gold, Marsha's neighbour
- Andy Gätjen as Edward Diehl, Clara's boss
- Dimitri Abold as Max, a train dispatcher; Clara's colleague
- Langston Uibel as Colin, a train passenger and schoolteacher
- Felix Mayr as Lukas, a train passenger; teacher's assistant
- Paddy Holland as George, a train passenger; one of Colin's students
- Isobel Imade as Rebecca, a train passenger; one of Colin's students
- Gretchen Mae Bean as Tania, a train passenger; one of Colin's students
- Martin Oelbermann as Alexander, a train passenger
- Katrin Röver as Lena, a U-Bahn station manager
- Ben Willbond as Graham, an MI6 officer at the British Embassy in Berlin
- Sebastian Hülk as Dieter Wolf, a GSG 9 commander
- Daniel Fritz as Frohms, a German BfV agent
- Sam Sharma as Linder, a German BfV agent
- Olive Gray as Leah Dönitz, Timo's wife

== Episodes ==
=== Series overview ===
Series	Episodes	Originally released		
Series	Episodes	First released	Last released	Network
1	7	28 June 2023	2 August 2023	Apple TV+
2	8	14 January 2026	4 March 2026	Apple TV

=== Series 1 (2023) ===
No. overall	No. in series	Title	Directed by	Written by	Original release date
1	1	"Final Call"	Jim Field Smith	George Kay	28 June 2023
Corporate business negotiator Sam Nelson boards Kingdom Airlines flight KA29 from Dubai to London to return to his estranged wife. At the airport, he convinces gate staff to allow fellow passenger Alec on after he narrowly misses the gate closing. After takeoff, teenage passenger Naomi finds a bullet in the bathroom and tells Marcus, a friendly fellow passenger. Marcus, secretly part of a hijacking crew, informs leader Stuart and his colleagues to expedite the takeover. Using Glock 19 pistols hidden in toiletry bags, several hijackers take control of the plane, speaking both English and Arabic. Airport screener Neela, who allowed the guns on board, returns home when her husband and child are threatened. The hijackers access the cockpit by threatening Collette, a flight attendant whom Captain Robin Allen is having an affair with. Before the Wi-Fi is turned off, Sam is able to text his wife about the incident, and she passes it to her boyfriend, DI Daniel O'Farrell, who works for the Metropolitan Police.
2	2	"3 Degrees"	Jim Field Smith	George Kay	28 June 2023
Two passengers attack one of the hijackers, and Sam picks up his gun. The passengers are subdued, and Sam returns the pistol to Stuart Atterton, the lead hijacker. O'Farrell contacts his ex, DCI Zahra Gahfoor from SO15, who reaches out to colleagues at Heathrow Airport, who state the KA29 call was a false alarm. He relays this to Marsha. Abdullah, the Dubai flight controller whom Allen assured everything was fine, has doubts about KA29's status. He notices Neela leaving security screening on CCTV, before her shift ends. Allen is removed from the cockpit, and tells Sam that the Iraqi military will be contacted when they enter their airspace and nobody responds. However, the hijackers force Allen to confirm to Baghdad ATC there is no issue. At Heathrow, air traffic controller Alice Sinclair also questions the "false alarm" and notices a slight deviation in the flight plan, a post-9/11 indication for help. Arriving at Neela's house, Abdullah finds her and her family murdered and is killed by British assassins.
3	3	"Draw a Blank"	Jim Field Smith	Adam Gyngell, Fred Fernandez Armesto, George Kay	5 July 2023
Sinclair calls Gahfoor about her concerns, who then escalates the matter to the Home Office and JTAC. Passenger Yussef, a former Egyptian Army officer, thinks the hijackers are using blanks, but can't be sure. Arthur, a flight attendant, tells Sam about the bullet Naomi found. Sam works with the flight crew to get a drawing of a real bullet and blank round to Naomi, who identifies the latter. Atterton calls their superior to update them, but the call goes to voicemail. Tindall, a senior official, calls in Foreign Secretary Louise Aitchison. Gahfoor sends the KA29 manifest to O'Farrell, who notices that five names (the hijackers) do not appear on any national databases, but their passports seem legitimate. Hijacker Jaden attacks Nasir, a passenger trying to get insulin for his uncle. In the melee, a child, Lizzie Miller, goes missing, and Sam sneaks to the back of the plane to attack Marcus and disarm him but is overpowered. Atterton swaps his blanks for live rounds and approaches the back. Challenged by Sam, Marcus raises his gun. A shot is fired.
4	4	"Not Responding"	Mo Ali	Kam Odedra and George Kay	12 July 2023
Atterton kills an Australian passenger as a warning. In the melee, Lewis is stabbed by a passenger. Atterton tells Lewis they are doing the hijack "for Edgar and John". Sam is tied up by Marcus but soon released to provide first aid as Lewis bleeds out. As KA29 enters Romanian airspace without responding, two NATO Eurofighter Typhoons are scrambled with orders to shoot it down as it approaches Bucharest. Aitchison takes control, and the prime minister is called. Whilst helping Lewis call his mother, Sam uses the cellphone to send contact info to Marsha, who passes it to O'Farrell. Checking the PNC, he and Gahfoor ascertain the hijackers' identities, realising they are part of organised crime, not terrorists. Aitchison passes this information to the Romanians, who call off the jets just in time. David, doctor on board, carries out a makeshift thoracostomy on Lewis to stop him from dying. Two more British assassins scope out the Nelson residence. The home secretary is given a list of demands by Devlin, an associate of the hijackers.
5	5	"Less Than an Hour"	Mo Ali	Anna-Maria Ssemuyaba and George Kay	19 July 2023
As the plane enters Hungarian airspace, Lewis's condition starts to deteriorate. Dubai police are called to Neela's house, and her dog leads them to the bodies of Neela, her family, and Abdullah. Meanwhile, the hijackers begin to argue over what to do next. It is revealed that their demands are to get Edgar Janssen and John Bailey-Brown, the leaders of the Cheapside Firm, released from prison. The home secretary conveys this to Gahfoor and Aitchison, while the prime minister is on hold. Atterton decides to use First Officer Anna Kovács to get her to communicate to Hungarian ATC that they are landing at Győr Airport and need medical assistance. The TEK is immediately dispatched to the airport to neutralise the hijackers. O'Farrell and his associate go to visit Elaine, Lewis and Atterton's mother. Elaine tells O'Farrell about the organised crime syndicate then runs onto a motorway, where she is killed by a truck. Terry then tells Sam that their organised crime heads will kill them and their family if they land, as he reveals that they have Sam's family info. Lewis withdraws the pen that David inserted into his chest, effectively killing himself. Atterton sees this and tells Deevia Khan to instruct Anna to stop the landing. Assassins working for the organised crime group enter Sam's home, and Sam's son Kai notices their guns and hides.
6	6	"Comply Slowly"	Jim Field Smith	Catherine Moulton and George Kay	26 July 2023
Sam's son Kai escapes the assassins by hiding inside a wardrobe. The British government concedes to the demands of the hijackers and releases Edgar and John from prison. However, when the police keep following them, Edgar texts the hijackers to kill one passenger and send a photo. Sam intervenes and convinces Stuart that there is already a dead passenger on board and therefore no need to kill another one. The government task force tracks Edgar's car using drone surveillance and sees that he and John are headed to a nearby airfield. Meanwhile, inside the aeroplane, passengers are beginning to plan a revolt. At the same time, news breaks out in the British media that KA29 has been hijacked and Kingdom Air's stock price falls, as Edgar had hoped. Some of the passengers on KA29 begin fighting the hijackers, when an unknown assailant executes Captain Allen, enters the cockpit and locks it, to the surprise of everyone on board.
7	7	"Brace Brace Brace"	Jim Field Smith	George Kay	2 August 2023
The passengers take over the cabin, and Sam convinces Atterton to give up his pistol. The unknown assailant, revealed to be Amanda Taunton, a former Royal Navy aviation consultant, puts the aircraft on course for central London. Sam tries to convince her to allow him access to the cockpit, but to no avail. On the ground, O'Farrell realises that Kai is in danger at Sam's house and rushes there to save him. As the aircraft enters British airspace, the Royal Air Force dispatches two Typhoons to intercept it. On board, the crew have returned the passengers' phones, and London ATC manages to establish contact with Sam. Alice convinces him to tell her the truth about the situation on board. Aitchison pleads with the prime minister not to shoot the plane down and offers to take the blame. Edgar and John bicker over when to close the short on Kingdom's stock, with Edgar wanting to let the plane crash in the city. Angered by this, John has Edgar shot dead. In the meantime, Daniel mounts a successful rescue operation of Kai. On the plane, having found Amanda's phone and learned of her family, Sam eventually convinces her to let him into the cockpit. Fearing for herself and her daughter's life, Amanda is reassured by Walsh over the phone that she will not be arrested, and she reveals to Sam that their plane, flying too low over central London, has no more fuel and will soon flame out. Alice redirects her to RAF Northolt but before they can reach the airfield, the engines die. Despite this, Amanda manages to land the aircraft, with all passengers safe. Emergency services assist with evacuation while rounding up the hijackers. Atterton, having broken free, shuts himself on the plane in an attempt to shoot Sam, who is still on board. The police storm the aircraft, and after being distracted by Sam, Atterton is arrested.

=== Series 2 (2026) ===
No. overall	No. in series	Title	Directed by	Written by	Original release date
8	1	"Signal"	Jim Field Smith	Guy Bolton	14 January 2026
Sam visits Berlin on a business trip, ostensibly to meet the British Embassy and German BMJV. He runs into a former intern, Mei, on the U5 line. Marsha, staying in rural Scotland, receives a delivery of flowers. Detective Zoran Beck raids an apartment with SEK, finding forged U-Bahn ID cards. Marko, a man disguised as a construction worker, uses the ID to enter the U5 line. Sam directs two police officers to a suspicious passenger, whom they force off the train. A group of British schoolchildren board. Embassy staffer Olivia Thatcher presents BMJV official Arnold Goth with CCTV footage sent to her by Sam, appearing to show surviving KA29 hijack orchestrator John Bailey-Brown entering Germany via Hamburg. Train driver Otto Weber distraughtly tries to call Marko, but he doesn't pick up. Otto drives the train through two stations without stopping, despite orders from dispatcher Clara Berger. Marko redirects the carriage to a disused section of track, and it halts. Sam enters the driver's cabin and tells Otto he is hijacking the train.
9	2	"Control"	Jim Field Smith	Guy Bolton	21 January 2026
Federal Police Berlin division chief Ada Winter and her deputy, Roland Murnau, arrive at U-Bahn headquarters and are joined by British intelligence official Peter Faber. Sam tells Winter and Clara he needs Bailey-Brown's exact location or people will die. Marsha discovers her bothy has been broken into. Beck's forensic team find a burner phone linking Sam to Marko. The train moves via service tunnels to the U8 line but is delayed by a halted carriage. Sam discovers the U-Bahn has been evacuated. Those on board become increasingly suspicious. Sam makes passenger Freddie walk to the Alexanderplatz platform while holding a suspect briefcase, to force Winter to move the carriage. After noticing an increased MI6 presence at the embassy, Thatcher goes to U-Bahn control and reveals Sam's identity to Faber and the police. GSG 9 are deployed to extract station manager Lena and leave Freddie. Sam cuts CCTV footage to the platform to give the illusion to the control room that the briefcase has detonated.
10	3	"Baggage"	Jim Field Smith	Kelly Jones	28 January 2026
After setting a fire to aid the illusion, Sam gets the blocking carriage moved. He takes Freddie back on the train and demands confirmation that Bailey-Brown is in custody. Thatcher tells the police it is a year since the murder of Kai, Sam's son, and he believes Bailey-Brown is responsible. Winter discovers Faber and his MI5 colleague Lang already have Bailey-Brown detained. This is confirmed to Sam, with Faber telling Thatcher he plans to extradite Bailey-Brown to the UK. Sam instead demands he be brought to the train, and after Marsha is threatened, suggests MI5 are forcing his hand. The police discover no bomb detonated, but Beck assures them he found evidence of bombmaking. Power is cut to the train, and passengers grow more suspicious, with some trying to escape. Sam and Otto find an explosive strapped underneath it. An unknown assailant kills Freddie, much to Sam's shock. Sam tells Winter the train is rigged, forcing her to restore power and let him continue. Marsha is confronted by a man named Nick Ridge.
11	4	"Switch"	Shaun James Grant	Thomas Eccleshare	4 February 2026
Sam tells the passengers about the bomb, maintaining the facade that he is behind the hijacking. He and Otto agree to find Freddie's killer and uncover the real orchestrator. O'Farrell is briefed by Gahfoor on Sam's involvement. He asks Ridge, an old friend, to take Marsha somewhere safe, but Ridge gets shot by her neighbours Gold and Mansell before he can. Mei begins doubting Sam's complicity, but the man she suspects is revealed to just be a drug dealer hiding his stash. Beck discovers Sam planted a coaster from the Fox Hole pub in the station before boarding. Faber tries to extradite Bailey-Brown but is stopped by Winter, who orders the BfV to hand him over instead. Murnau revokes Faber's diplomatic credentials, but Lang offers to "take care" of Bailey-Brown for Faber. Unable to view encrypted CCTV from the cabin, Sam smuggles the USB drive off the train via a sick baby he agrees to release to its mother. During the handover, he deduces that passenger Jess killed Freddie.
12	5	"Outage"	Shaun James Grant	Emer Kenny and Chris Dunlop	11 February 2026
Sam notices Jess covertly handling a detonator, but passengers overpower him and Otto. He reveals he is being watched and forced to hijack in exchange for Bailey-Brown, warning that the bombs will detonate if anyone gets off before the handover. They reluctantly agree to continue. Beck discovers in the Fox Hole that Sam was there before with another Brit and is told by forensics that the bombs are air-gapped and can't be defused remotely. Thatcher meets with Faber, who tells her Sam is being set up as a patsy. The two agree to find who provided Sam with the CCTV of Bailey-Brown entering Germany. O'Farrell and Gahfoor question Atterton, the incarcerated lead KA29 hijacker, who suggests Berlin is a setup for the gang to spring Bailey-Brown from custody. After passenger Petra notices Jess has the detonator, she is disarmed by the others, but one bomb explodes in the rear carriage. The convoy transporting Bailey-Brown to the handover is aborted by Murnau. Gold and Mansell decide to take Marsha hostage.
13	6	"Junction"	Shaun James Grant	James Dormer	18 February 2026
The explosion causes damage that prevents the train from being tracked. Petra dies after getting injured in the explosion. Beck identifies the bombmaker "Marko" as Jozef Kaminski, who is fleeing to Warsaw. Thatcher and Faber enlist the help of MI6 staff at the embassy. Marsha escapes Gold and Mansell. Lang is revealed to have recruited Jess and Sam but reports to a higher figure. Threatening to blow up the remainder of the train, he forces them to get Winter to resume the convoy. Jess says she killed Freddie to stop the whole train and Marsha from being killed. Bailey-Brown arrives at the handover, but after Lang warns them of a planned police ambush, Sam and Jess get out of the carriage to manually activate a rail change. The baby's mother finds and takes the USB drive to the police, with the footage showing Jess killing Freddie. Wolf, the GSG-9 team leader, encounters Sam and Jess on the tracks when approaching the train. Sam appears to take Jess hostage, but Winter gives permission for Wolf to shoot her.
14	7	"Contact"	Jim Field Smith	Jim Field Smith	25 February 2026
Jess is injured, but she and Sam escape to the train. Faber tells Winter that Sam is being coerced, but she demands proof. He obtains Sam's laptop, and MI6 conclude Sam was contacted by intelligence agents. Lang tells Bailey-Brown he will be freed if he plays along and orders Jess and Sam to a new handover near Britz-Süd. He also kills Linder, a BfV agent growing suspicious of him, and takes his radio and pistol. Gold and Mansell pursue Marsha, but she sends her location to O'Farrell and a message via Sam's phone to Thatcher, telling him not to let the perpetrators use her life as a bargaining chip. However, Winter orders GSG-9 to intercept anyway to save the hostages. As the train begins to lose power, Otto reveals that it is actually two two-car train sets combined, prompting Sam and Jess to de-couple the damaged train, taking the opportunity to move the baby's father and most of the schoolchildren onto it. GSG-9 cut the power and board and evacuate the hostages on that train. Jess commits suicide by cop. Sam convinces Winter they can only identify the real threat and save the remaining hostages if the train continues to the handover, and it departs. In Belmarsh, Atterton is given a phone by a corrupt guard.
15	8	"Terminal"	Jim Field Smith	Guy Bolton	4 March 2026
Sam tells Thatcher the handover must continue until Marsha is safe. Atterton is revealed to be the main orchestrator, wanting to eliminate Bailey-Brown so he can become head of the Cheapside Firm. He calls Lang and demands that Bailey-Brown be handed over or Lang will not get paid. The police identify Jess as a former Moroccan soldier. Faber finds Linder's body and determines that Lang (ex-military who worked with Jess as a mercenary) is the orchestrator. At the Britz-Süd depot, Sam releases the passengers. Lang and Bailey-Brown get on to complete the handover, but Sam and Otto drive the train away. Bailey-Brown tells Sam he did not kill Kai and that Lang has manipulated him. Lang incapacitates Sam, flees the train, and detonates the bombs. Believing Sam and Bailey-Brown dead, he calls Atterton to demand a higher share of the fortune made from the KA29 hijacking short. However, Sam and Otto survive. GSG-9 pursue Lang and shoot him dead when he makes a sudden movement. Marsha makes a bonfire to signal a police helicopter, which finds her and forces Gold and Mansell to surrender. Atterton's machinations are discovered, and he is apprehended in prison, with O'Farrell confirming that Sam and Marsha are alive. Thatcher gives Sam his phone to call Marsha, confirming she is safe.

== Production ==
It was announced in April 2022 that Apple TV+ had greenlit the miniseries, which would see Idris Elba starring and serving as an executive producer. George Kay would write the script, and Jim Field Smith would direct. In May, Archie Panjabi joined the cast. Production began on 9 May 2022 in Aylesbury and wrapped up on 18 November 2022. The first series consists of seven episodes. In January 2024, it was renewed for a second series, and filming began in June.

== Release ==
The first series premiered on Apple TV+ on 28 June 2023, and the second series on 14 January 2026.

== Reception ==
=== Critical response ===
Critical response of Hijack
Series	Rotten Tomatoes	Metacritic
1	90% (69 reviews)	65 (27 reviews)
2	74% (34 reviews)	65 (12 reviews)

==== Series 1 ====
On the review aggregator Rotten Tomatoes, the first series holds a 90% approval rating, with an average of 6.9/10, based on 69 critic reviews. The website's critics consensus reads, "Largely devoid of storytelling turbulence and benefitting greatly from its real-time pacing, Hijack is a glossy but effective thriller that achieves genuine liftoff." Metacritic, which uses a weighted average, assigned the show a score of 65 out of 100, based on 27 critics, indicating "generally favorable" reviews.

Lucy Mangan of The Guardian gave the first series four out of five stars and wrote, "All turbulence is intended and the landing – for I binged all seven episodes in one sitting, and I bet you will too – impeccable. Perfect nonsense, to be enjoyed wholeheartedly – though probably, for anxious passengers, on terra firma."

==== Series 2 ====
On Rotten Tomatoes, the second series has a 74% approval rating, based on 34 critic reviews. The website's critics consensus reads, "Replaying the same formula in a new setting, Hijack's second season doesn't quite justify continuing a story that worked best as a one-off, but watching Idris Elba save the day remains a thrill." On Metacritic, it has a weighted average score of 65 out of 100, based on 12 critics, indicating "generally favorable" reviews.

=== Viewership ===
The week of its finale, 31 July–6 August 2023, Hijack became the second Apple TV+ show to be listed on the Nielsen streaming rankings for original shows when it received 357 million minutes of viewing time.

=== Accolades ===
Year	Award	Category	Nominee(s)	Result	Ref.
2024	Black Reel Awards	Outstanding Lead Performance in a Drama Series	Idris Elba	Won	
2024	Critics' Choice Super Awards	Best Actor in an Action Series, Limited Series or Made-for-TV Movie	Idris Elba	Won	
2024	Primetime Emmy Awards	Outstanding Lead Actor in a Drama Series	Idris Elba	Nominated	
2025	AARP Movies for Grownups Awards	Best Actor – Television	Idris Elba	Nominated	
