= Bull (2021 film) =

2021 British revenge thriller film

- Theatrical release poster
- Directed by: Paul Andrew Williams
- Written by: Paul Andrew Williams
- Produced by: Dominic Tighe; Sarah Gabriel; Marc Goldberg; Leonora Darby; Mark Lane
- Starring: Neil Maskell; David Hayman; Tamzin Outhwaite; Lois Brabin-Platt
- Cinematography: Ben Chads; Vanessa Whyte
- Edited by: James Taylor
- Music by: Raffertie
- Production companies: Ingenious Media; Particular Crowd; Tea Shop Productions; Signature Films; Giant Productions
- Distributed by: Signature Entertainment
- Release dates: 6 August 2021 (Montreal); 5 November 2021 (UK)
- Running time: 88 minutes
- Country: United Kingdom
- Language: English
- Box office: $17,426

Bull is a 2021 British crime thriller film with a supernatural tinge, written and directed by Paul Andrew Williams. The film stars Neil Maskell as the titular character seeking revenge on his former gang associates and father-in-law to get his son.

== Plot ==
The film opens with three men burying a burning body in a secluded field.

Bull, a mysterious and seemingly unstoppable man, returns to exact vengeance on the people who tried to kill him.

In flashback, Bull is shown murdering an unidentified man in the street. Returning to the present, he then targets his ex-wife's sister, Cheryl, and her husband, Ollie, killing them brutally in their home. He continues his rampage by finding and killing Marco, one of the gangsters involved in his past betrayal, by knifing him in the mouth.

Flashbacks reveal that ten years earlier, Bull was an enforcer working for his father-in-law, Norm, a ruthless gang leader. Bull's violent tendencies made him a feared and effective figure within the gang (at one point he severs the fingers of a butcher who Norm's gang is leaning on to sign a contract), but Bull's violence also alienated those around him. When Bull discovers that his wife, Gemma, is cheating on him with fellow gang member Gary and is also using heroin, tensions escalate. Norm urges Bull to divorce Gemma and surrender custody of their son, Aiden, so Gemma can marry Gary. Norm's motives are financial — he wants to exploit Gary's connections to the drug trade to expand the gang's profits.

Bull refuses to give up his son. In response, Norm, Gemma, Gary, Marco, and Clive abduct Bull's son. Clive, reluctant and apologetic, closes the boot of the car as Bull is taken to an abandoned caravan, where after being knocked down by Gemma and forced to drink whiskey, Bull is burned alive in the caravan. Aidan jumps out of Gemma's car just as Bull, on fire, breaks out of the caravan. Aidan witnesses his father burned alive and then being shot to death by Norm and the others.

Bull's later miraculous return remains unexplained. When Norm learns of his daughter Cheryl's death, he vows revenge. He tortures Bull's mother, Marge, for information, despite objections from his crew. Bull watches silently from the shadows. After Norm leaves, Bull enters and asks his mother if she wants help, then smothers her to end her suffering.

Bull later kidnaps Clive's children to force him into helping lure Gary to a funfair. After Clive complies, Bull releases him and his children, allowing them to go home. He takes Gary hostage, interrogates him for Gemma's location, then severs Gary's femoral artery and leaves him to bleed to death on a carnival ride.

In Gemma's new town, Bull confronts a heroin dealer, severely mutilates him (cutting off his hand and then cauterising the stump in a gas jet on a stove). Bull then steals his pills, rings and money, and forces him to reveal Gemma's address. Bull forces the dealer to guide him via car to Gemma's house, where Bull coerces her into luring Norm there, before binding her with tape. When Norm arrives and mistakes the unconscious dealer (who is lying on the back seat of Bull's car) for Bull, he orders gang member Colin to kill him. Colin fires two shots, which kill the dealer, not Bull. Instead, Bull ambushes Norm inside the house, stabbing him through the leg. Norm's gun goes off, shooting Gemma in the shoulder. Bull then tortures both Norm and Gemma to learn Aiden's whereabouts. Gemma reveals that Aiden, traumatized by witnessing his father's death, became addicted to heroin. Bull kills Norm and then shoots Gemma after demanding she look in his eyes.

Bull eventually finds Aiden, strung out and unconscious, with a group of other men sleeping rough beneath a bridge. He carries him to a church and watches over him through the night. The next morning, the vicar finds Aiden sleeping under the altar. When she sees Bull, she recoils in terror, demanding to know how he dares enter a house of God. Bull turns, revealing that his eyes are completely black.

Flashbacks confirm that Bull's eyes have been black throughout the film. It is implied that he truly died ten years ago and was resurrected to avenge his death. He begs the vicar to help save Aiden and leaves behind the drug dealer's money for his son's care.

In the final scene, Bull returns to the field where he was buried.

== Cast ==
- Neil Maskell as Bull
- David Hayman as Norm
- Lois Brabin-Platt as Gemma
- Henri Charles as Aiden
- David Nellist as Clive
- Kevin Harvey as Gary
- Jason Milligan as Marco
- Ajay Chhabra as Mike
- Tamzin Outhwaite as Sharon

== Production and release ==
Bull was written and directed by Paul Andrew Williams and set up the launch of Giant Productions for producer Dominic Tighe.

Bull has its world premiere at the Fantasia Film Festival in Montreal on 6 August 2021 and then screened at the BFI London Film Festival before wider release in the United Kingdom on 5 November 2021. At the 2021 American Film Market, Saban Films picked up the North American distribution rights, planning for release in the second quarter of 2022.

== Reception ==
On the review aggregator website Rotten Tomatoes, 93% of 40 critics' reviews are positive, with an average rating of 7.3/10. The website's critical consensus reads, "Bull isn't for the faint of heart, but this down-and-dirty revenge thriller packs a charge for fans of old-school crime dramas." Metacritic, which uses a weighted average, assigned the film a score of 72 out of 100 based on nine critics, indicating "generally favorable reviews".

Ian Freer of Empire wrote, "Paul Andrew Williams and Neil Maskell breathe new life into a familiar one-man-army scenario."
