= Criminal: France =

2019 French-language television series

- Release poster
- Genre: Police procedural anthology series
- Created by: George Kay; Jim Field Smith
- Written by: Frederic Mermoud; Mathieu Missoffe; George Kay; Antonin Martin-Hilbert
- Directed by: Frédéric Mermoud
- Starring: Margot Bancilhon; Laurent Lucas; Stéphane Jobert
- Country of origin: France
- Original language: French
- No. of seasons: 1
- No. of episodes: 3

Production
- Running time: 37–42 minutes
- Production company: Idiotlamp Productions

Original release
- Network: Netflix
- Release: 20 September 2019

Related
- Criminal: Germany; Criminal: Spain; Criminal: UK

Criminal: France is a 2019 French-language police procedural anthology series created by George Kay and Jim Field Smith and starring Nathalie Baye, Jérémie Renier and Sara Giraudeau. Criminal: France is part of Netflix's Criminal, an anthology series consisting of twelve episodes, with three episodes set in each of four countries, filmed in local languages – France, Spain, Germany and the UK.

It was released on 20 September 2019 on Netflix.

== Premise ==
Set within the confines of a police interrogation room, French investigators engage in intense games of psychological cat-and-mouse with their accused suspects to find the answers they need in order to solve their cases.

== Cast ==
=== Accused ===
- Sara Giraudeau - Émilie Weber
- Nathalie Baye - Caroline Solal
- Jérémie Renier - Jérôme Lacombe

=== Police ===
- Margot Bancilhon - Commander Audrey Larsen
- Stéphane Jobert - Commander Gérard Sarkissian
- Laurent Lucas - Captain Olivier Hagen
- Mhamed Arezki - Brigadier Omar Matif
- Anne Azoulay - Brigadier Laetitia Serra

== Episodes ==
No.	Title	Directed by	Written by	Original release date
1	"Émilie"	Frédéric Mermoud	Frédéric Mermoud & Mathieu Missoffe and George Kay	20 September 2019
Bataclan massacre survivor Émilie is brought in to discuss her recollections of the attack that tragically took the life of her boyfriend, but investigators suspect that her story does not ring true.
2	"Caroline"	Frédéric Mermoud	Antonin Martin-Hilbert	20 September 2019
After an accident occurs at a building site, investigators interrogate construction executive Caroline, who seems to have more of a history with the victim than known.
3	"Jérôme"	Frédéric Mermoud	Mathieu Missoffe	20 September 2019
Before the break of dawn, investigators are brought in to interrogate sales manager Jérôme, who is suspected of committing a violent hate crime.

== Production ==
All the episodes were filmed at Netflix's production hub at Ciudad de la Tele in Madrid.

== Release ==
Criminal: France was released on 20 September 2019 on Netflix.
