= The Wrong Mans =

2010s British TV series

- Genre: Black Comedy; Comedy drama; Sitcom
- Created by: James Corden; Mathew Baynton
- Written by: James Corden; Mathew Baynton; Tom Basden
- Directed by: Jim Field Smith
- Starring: Mathew Baynton; James Corden
- Composer: Kevin Sargent
- Country of origin: United Kingdom
- Original language: English
- No. of series: 2
- No. of episodes: 8 (UK broadcast); 10 (US broadcast)

Production
- Executive producers: Charlotte Koh; Mark Freeland
- Producers: Jim Field Smith; Charlie Leech; Lucy Robinson
- Editors: David Webb; Victoria Boydell
- Running time: 30/60 minutes (Series 2)
- Production companies: BBC Studios; Hulu

Original release
- Network: BBC Two; BBC Two HD
- Release: 24 September 2013 – 23 December 2014

The Wrong Mans is a British comedy drama television series, produced by BBC Television and Hulu. It premiered on BBC Two on 24 September 2013 and in the United States on 11 November 2013. Considered a critical and ratings success, it was co-created and written by Gavin & Stacey alumni James Corden and Mathew Baynton as an attempt to combine the situation comedy format with the intricate plotting and storytelling tropes of an action-adventure series.

A two-part sequel series aired on BBC Two in the runup to Christmas 2014, with Hulu broadcasting the same series in four parts on Christmas Eve.

In 2018, it was announced that an American remake of the show was being produced for Showtime by J. J. Abrams's Bad Robot and BBC Studios. However, the pilot was later cancelled by Showtime. In 2022, a French remake of the show called The French Mans was released on Disney+.

== Premise ==
Berkshire County Council worker Sam Pinkett and Phil Bourne, who does not work for the council but works inside the building, become entangled in a far-fetched web of crime, conspiracy and corruption after Sam answers a ringing mobile phone at the site of a car crash.

== Cast ==
- Mathew Baynton as Samuel James Pinkett
- James Corden as Philip Neville Bourne
- Sarah Solemani as Lizzie Green
- Tom Basden as Noel Ward
- Paul Cawley as Alan
- Chandeep Uppal as Sabrina
- Dawn French as Linda Bourne
- Nick Moran as Nick Stevens
- Emilia Fox as Scarlett Stevens
- David Calder as Mr. Reid
- Benedict Wong as Mr Lau
- Andrew Koji as Jason Lau
- Christina Chong as May Wu
- Dougray Scott as Agent Jack Walker
- Stephen Campbell Moore as Paul Smoke
- Karel Roden as Marat Malankovic
- Duncan Pow as Petr
- Alec Utgoff as Yuri & Dimitri
- Rebecca Front as Cox
- Rowena King as Wood
- Ray Panthaki as Khalil (Series 2)
- Anastasia Griffith as Agent Miller (Series 2)
- Bertie Carvel as Nathan Cross (Series 2)
- Raoul Trujillo as Carlos Espinoza (Series 2)
- John Ross Bowie as Dave Kinsman (Series 2)
- Samantha Spiro as Maria (Series 2)
- Rosa Whitcher as Rosa (Series 2)
- Trevor Cooper as Guard Harry (Series 2)

== Production ==
On 9 October 2012, BBC Two controller Janice Hadlow announced The Wrong Mans as a co-production between BBC In-House Comedy and Hulu. The series was commissioned by Janice Hadlow and Cheryl Taylor. A pilot based on Baynton and Corden's initial series pitch had previously been shot in 2010; some elements were retained for what eventually became the first episode of the full series, including a cameo from David Harewood. Principal filming on the series began in January 2013, at the same time as the cast was announced. Jeremy Dyson was the script editor for the series.

The idea for the series initially arose out of a conversation between Corden and Baynton on the set of Gavin & Stacey, four years earlier, regarding the apparent scarcity of TV sitcoms with the same level of intricate, meaningful plotting as then-current dramatic hits 24 and Lost. As a starting-point for their own half-hour comedy show pitch to the BBC, the duo were further inspired by the Coen Brothers' film Burn After Reading, with its central concept of ordinary characters obviously out of their depth in a standard action-movie scenario. The humour in their new TV series, Baynton and Corden decided, would arise not so much from deliberate jokes as from the sheer realistic ineptitude of the heroes' attempts to cope with a high-stakes melodrama constantly snowballing further out of their control.

Once they began actually writing the series, the two quickly realised this would mean carrying through a much more ambitious project than they had anticipated, eventually leading to a significant amount of effort spent attempting to work out a believably complex, well-paced thriller plot. Producer/director Jim Field Smith described the result as a "movie broken into six parts", and in filming aimed for a likewise ambitious fusion of the realistic and cinematic, insisting that the thriller elements be played entirely straight.

Regarding the apparently awkward title, Corden explained that the extra and ungrammatical "s" was deliberately placed "to let you know it's a comedy show. If it was a drama, it'd be called The Wrong Man."

Despite the first series' apparently self-contained storyline, as of the midpoint of its initial airing, BBC executives had already confirmed that "there is a desire to bring it back and discussions are ongoing". Immediately post-finale, both co-creators and Field Smith confirmed their interest in returning, on Twitter and during media appearances. Baynton said in an interview shortly thereafter that they had come up with what they thought was a plausible way to continue the same duo's adventures for a second series. In February 2014, Baynton said that he and Corden had finished plotting the new series and were about to start work on the scripts. In April 2014, BBC Two officially announced that a second series had been commissioned.

Filming began on the new series in August 2014 in and around Bracknell, with Field Smith returning as producer/director. The new plotline was conceived as a direct continuation of the events of the first, using a deliberately hanging plot thread—the bomb seen planted under a car in the final shot—as the starting-point in a storyline that charted the duo's equally outlandish attempts to reclaim their ordinary lives. Describing their efforts in comparison to the original, Corden and Baynton reiterated that "this new series is bigger and bolder... If series one was the frying pan, this is the fire." Other returning cast members include Dawn French, Rebecca Front, Sarah Solemani and Tom Basden, all reprising their roles from the first series. BBC Two scheduled the new series as part of their 2014 Christmas programming line-up, running the episodes in two hour-long blocks successively on 22 and 23 December. The same episodes broken into four half-hours subsequently premiered on Hulu.com on 24 December.

== Episode list ==
=== Series 1 (2013) ===
No.	Title	Directed by	Written by	Original release date	UK viewers (millions)
1	"The Wrong Mans"	Jim Field Smith	James Corden and Mathew Baynton	24 September 2013	4.45
When Sam Pinkett discovers a discarded mobile at the scene of an isolated car accident, the voice on the other end of the line, thinking Sam to be the phone owner, tells him that they will kill his kidnapped wife unless they meet him by 5pm. Terrified, hungover and already very late for work – where his recently ex-girlfriend Lizzie has become his boss – Sam opts to head into the office with the phone before telling the police. There his troubles are increased when Phil Bourne, his bumbling wannabe friend, discovers what is going on and urges him to see it as their chance to become heroes. When they try to find the owner of the phone, they are snatched off the streets.
2	"Bad Mans"	Jim Field Smith	James Corden and Mathew Baynton	1 October 2013	3.24
The original owner of the phone, Nick Stevens, has traced the phone to Sam but is still missing his money, intended to ransom his wife Scarlett, who is being held as security against his massive debt to underground casino boss Mr. Lau. Stevens decides that, rather than kill the duo outright, he will send them with an empty suitcase to the meetup. But Sam and Phil not only manage an improbably daring escape but inadvertently wind up in control of a valuable hostage of their own.
3	"Dead Mans"	Jim Field Smith	Tom Basden and Mathew Baynton	8 October 2013	3.23
Although Sam manages to successfully negotiate the release of Scarlett in exchange for their own hostage--despite Phil's bumbling--they are soon in even more trouble when Scarlett reveals herself as the most dangerous enemy they've yet faced by murdering her husband and framing Sam and Phil for the crime. The duo manage to find apparent sanctuary with MI5 agent Jack Walker, but can he keep them safe for long?
4	"Inside Mans"	Jim Field Smith	James Corden and Mathew Baynton	15 October 2013	2.86
Devious Scarlett sends Sam and Phil on a mission to obtain a precious music box from eccentric Russian millionaire Marat Malankovic. They head undercover at one of Marat's drug-fuelled wild parties--at which Sam, mistaken by Malankovic for the male prostitute he hired, is forced to elaborate lengths to maintain the deception--but are forced out empty handed and soon find their own refuge gone as Agent Walker is murdered by double agent Paul Smoke.
5	"Wanted Mans"	Jim Field Smith	Tom Basden and Mathew Baynton	22 October 2013	2.93
Sam and Phil turn to Phil's mother Linda for help as they bring a badly injured Marat to her, but the handover of Marat to MI5 does not go as planned, as Smoke is always one step ahead. After a showdown at the council offices, they end up on the run again as highly valued fugitives.
6	"Running Mans"	Jim Field Smith	James Corden and Mathew Baynton	29 October 2013	2.86
Sam and Phil's relationship is tested to the limit as they realise the ones they love are in danger as they continue to live life on the run. At Lizzie's gala dinner, Smoke and his cronies close in for a final showdown with the Wrong Mans.

=== Series 2 (2014) ===
No. (UK)	No. (US)	Title	Directed by	Written by	Original release date	UK viewers (millions)
1	1 2	"X-Mans/White Mans" "X-Mans/A Few Good Mans"	Jim Field Smith	James Corden and Mathew Baynton	22 December 2014	2.82
After an attempt on their lives, Phil and Sam have been enrolled in a witness protection programme in Texas. Phil has settled in and has gained a girlfriend with fantastical lies about his past life, while Sam, deeply unhappy without Lizzie and drinking heavily, fends off the unwanted attentions of Maria, their supervisor. However, the news that Linda has had a heart attack convinces Phil to join Sam on a mission to get home with the help of people-trafficking drug lord Carlos Espinosa. Arrested at the airport with cocaine hidden in the musical instruments that were meant to provide their cover, they agree to testify against Espinosa. However, on their arrival in a Texas jail, a lawyer appointed by the drug lord warns them off and gives them a new task: to obtain the glass eye of a fellow prisoner, a vicious white supremacist, where they believe evidence is hidden. In the course of a brawl, they succeed in obtaining the eye and are immediately sprung from prison and into an aeroplane, only to find that their rescuers are unconnected with Espinosa.
2	3 4	"Action Mans/Wise Mans"	Jim Field Smith	James Corden, Mathew Baynton & Tom Basden	23 December 2014	2.66
Sam and Phil are busted out of prison by a gang of international mercenaries, having been mistaken for the previous tenants of their cell. After landing in Eastern Europe they are caught trying to run away by the leader of the gang, Khalil, who claims to be an undercover agent trying to prevent the theft of dangerous chemical VX, but after enlisting the duo in the theft double-crosses them and the entire gang. Sam and Phil manage to escape with the VX and catch a train to France, but without a passport they are unable to cross the Channel. They force local skydivers at (unloaded) gunpoint to fly them over, then hitch-hike into Bracknell, still being tracked by both Khalil and Yuri's vengeful brother Dmitri. Sam contacts MI5 and sets up a plan to exchange information and the VX for their old identities. They manage to do so in Bracknell town centre, where Khalil is caught. Sam and the MI5 agents then deal with Dmitri while Phil gets to the hospital to see his mum – and bumps into Espinosa's lawyer. Phil hands over the glass eye, but Espinosa is later caught as Phil has told his girlfriend in Texas to go to the DEA. Sam is finally reunited with Lizzie at the office Christmas party.

== Reception ==
=== Ratings ===
Overnight figures showed that the first episode was watched by 13.5% of the UK viewing audience at the time, or 3.08 million, making it BBC Two's most successful comedy debut since Extras eight years previously. Consolidated audience was 4.5 million, or 16%. Series consolidated viewing average was 3.3 million viewers or 12%, while the Sunday 10pm repeat averaged 494,000/2%.

In the US, Hulu initially launched the series by making either the first two episodes available to regular subscribers with one episode subsequently released each week, or all six immediately available to Hulu Plus subscribers. CEO Mike Hopkins confirmed that each episode ranked among the ten most-watched on the online service upon weekly release.

=== Critical response ===
Initial UK reviews for the series were generally positive. It was ranked No. 5 in Radio Times' annual critics' Top 40 TV series for 2013 and the first episode was an iTunes UK Editor's Choice as the same year's Best TV Episode. On making its Hulu debut, the show received an aggregate score of 80/100 from Metacritic based on seven major reviews, placing it in the top ten highest-rated series of the US fall season.

Praise for the "darkly comic caper", as Keith Watson described it for Metro, centred around both the moody, heavily stylised visual feel of the overall production and the contrasting comic chemistry between its two leads. "The mismatched buddy dynamic between the pair – nerdy, neurotic everyman and chubby gung-ho sidekick – was reminiscent of the Simon Pegg/Nick Frost Britcoms or a Coen Brothers flick," wrote Michael Hogan in The Daily Telegraph. Ellen Jones from The Independent said: "Thanks to slick direction and, one suspects, a large chunk of the BBC's autumn budget, it certainly looks as good as a Hollywood thriller."

Veteran TV writer Clive James of The Daily Telegraph said The Wrong Mans is "highly recognisable, as if it had been designed to fulfill all the requirements of British screen comedy... Remember Morecambe and Wise on the Riviera? This is the same thing, but better done. Having watched one episode, I vowed to watch another: instead of, as I usually do when a British comedy series is concerned, vowing to emigrate back to Australia."

Writing for the entertainment website HitFix, American veteran reviewer Alan Sepinwall noted that "I expected to be tired of the joke behind "The Wrong Mans" within an episode or two. Instead, I found myself engrossed enough in the story of who wanted Sam dead at any particular moment, and why, to keep watching until I made it all the way to the end and could appreciate just how well Baynton, Corden and company stuck the landing."

Several reviewers nevertheless felt the show's attempt to seamlessly mesh the comedy and thriller genres wasn't entirely successful, including Rachel Cooke in the New Statesman, who wrote that "I didn’t hate it... but all the same, I’m not sure that it quite works. Thirty minutes seems too short a time to accommodate both the tropes of a thriller and a tonne of jokes. I think they should have given themselves an hour, the better that the audience might get its ear in". Sam Wollaston in The Guardian wrote that he was "not convinced" by the series' tone, "nor that performers (mainly) necessarily make the best writers. Oh, and what's with that title? There's something wrong with it, isn't there? Grammatically?"

=== Awards and nominations ===
Year	Ceremony	Award	Nominee	Result
2014	RTS Programme Awards	Best Writer: Comedy	Mathew Baynton, James Corden and Tom Basden	Won
2014	BAFTA Television Awards	Best Male Comedy Performance	Mathew Baynton	Nominated
2014	BAFTA Television Awards	Best Male Comedy Performance	James Corden	Nominated
2014	BAFTA Television Craft Awards	Best Writer: Comedy	Mathew Baynton and James Corden	Nominated
2014	Satellite Awards	Best Television Series – Musical or Comedy	The Wrong Mans	Nominated
2014	Satellite Awards	Best Actor – Television Series Musical or Comedy	Mathew Baynton	Nominated
2014	Satellite Awards	Best Actor – Television Series Musical or Comedy	James Corden	Nominated
2014	British Comedy Awards	Best New Comedy Programme	The Wrong Mans	Nominated
2014	BANFF World Media Rockie Awards	Best Sitcom	The Wrong Mans	Nominated
2015	BAFTA Television Awards	Best Scripted Comedy	The Wrong Mans	Nominated
2015	BAFTA Television Craft Awards	Best Writer: Comedy	Mathew Baynton and James Corden	Nominated

== Home media ==
DVD and Blu-ray Disc editions of the first series were released in the UK on 4 November 2013. The second series was released onto DVD in the UK on 26 January 2015.

A boxset containing the first and second series of The Wrong Mans was also released in the UK on 26 January 2015.
