= Criminal: Germany =

2019 German-language television series

- Genre: Police procedural anthology series
- Created by: George Kay; Jim Field Smith
- Written by: Bernd Lange; Sebastian Heeg
- Directed by: Oliver Hirschbiegel
- Starring: Eva Meckbach; Sylvester Groth; Florence Kasumba
- Country of origin: Germany
- Original language: German
- No. of seasons: 1
- No. of episodes: 3

Production
- Running time: 41–45 minutes
- Production company: Idiotlamp Productions

Original release
- Network: Netflix
- Release: 20 September 2019

Related
- Criminal: France; Criminal: Spain; Criminal: UK

Criminal: Germany is a 2019 German-language police procedural anthology series created by George Kay and Jim Field Smith, and starring Eva Meckbach, Sylvester Groth and Florence Kasumba. Criminal: Germany is part of Netflix's Criminal, an anthology series consisting of twelve episodes with three episodes each set across four countries filmed in local languages – France, Spain, Germany and the UK.

It was released on 20 September 2019 on Netflix.

== Premise ==
Set within the confines of a police interrogation room, German investigators engage in intense games of psychological cat-and-mouse with their accused suspects to find the answers they need in order to solve their cases.

== Cast ==
=== Accused ===
- Peter Kurth - Jochen Müller
- Deniz Arora - Yilmaz Yussef
- Nina Hoss - Claudia Hartmann

=== Police ===
- Eva Meckbach - Detective Chief Inspector Nadine Keller
- Sylvester Groth - Detective Chief Inspector Karl Schulz
- Florence Kasumba - Antje Borchert
- Christian Kuchenbuch - Martin Ludwig
- Jonathan Berlin - Stefan Proska

=== Lawyers ===
- Christian Berkel - Dr. Marquardt

== Episodes ==
No.	Title	Directed by	Written by	Original release date
1	"Jochen"	Oliver Hirschbiegel	Bernd Lange	20 September 2019
Real estate developer Jochen is brought by investigators to be questioned not only about a missing handyman but also about the discovery of skeletal remains found beneath his first project in the former East Berlin.
2	"Yilmaz"	Oliver Hirschbiegel	Bernd Lange	20 September 2019
What seemed to be a clear-cut case of domestic abuse quickly turns awry when the suspect's powerful father-in-law enlists the aid of a lawyer in order to control the narrative.
3	"Claudia"	Oliver Hirschbiegel	Sebastian Heeg and Bernd Lange	20 September 2019
Investigators go toe-to-toe with Claudia, the hardened lover of a serial killer in order to find the location of a body.

== Production ==
All twelve episodes were filmed at Netflix's production hub at Ciudad de la Tele in Madrid.

== Release ==
Criminal: Germany was released on 20 September 2019 on Netflix.
