= The Wanted Man (TV series) =

Upcoming British television series

- Genre: Crime thriller
- Created by: George Kay
- Written by: George Kay
- Directed by: Jakob Verbruggen
- Starring: Hugh Laurie; Thandiwe Newton; Fionn Whitehead; Gina McKee; Hazel Doupe; Elliott Heffernan; Stephen Dillane
- Composer: Trevor Gureckis
- Country of origin: United Kingdom
- Original language: English

Production
- Executive producers: George Kay; Willow Grylls; Matt Sandford; Hugh Laurie
- Production companies: New Pictures; Observatory Pictures

Original release
- Network: Apple TV

The Wanted Man is an upcoming television series created and written by George Kay for Apple TV. It stars Hugh Laurie and Thandiwe Newton. It will premiere globally on 6 January 2027.

== Premise ==
An incarcerated crime boss realises he has been betrayed and endeavours to escape from prison to seek revenge and save his empire.

== Cast ==
- Hugh Laurie as Felix Carmichael
- Thandiwe Newton as Francesca Carmichael
- Fionn Whitehead as Scotty Walsh
- Gina McKee as Hannah Carmichael
- Hazel Doupe
- Elliott Heffernan as Campbell Strang
- Stephen Dillane as John Carmichael

== Production ==
The eight-part series is created by George Kay and produced by New Pictures and Kay's Observatory Pictures. Kay is the showrunner, and is also an executive producer alongside Willow Grylls and Matt Sandford. Jakob Verbruggen served as director.

Hugh Laurie leads the cast as an aging criminal with Gina McKee as his wife and Stephen Dillane as his brother. Thandie Newton and Elliott Heffernan are cast as mother and son. The cast also includes Hazel Doupe and Fionn Whitehead.

Principal photography began in London in May 2025, continuing through December.

== Release ==
The series will premiere globally on 6 January 2027.
