= Criminal: UK =

2019 television series

- Genre: Police procedural anthology series
- Created by: George Kay; Jim Field Smith
- Written by: George Kay
- Directed by: Jim Field Smith
- Starring: Katherine Kelly; Lee Ingleby; Mark Stanley; Rochenda Sandall; Shubham Saraf; Nicholas Pinnock; Aymen Hamdouchi
- Country of origin: United Kingdom
- Original language: English
- No. of series: 2
- No. of episodes: 7

Production
- Running time: 41–48 minutes
- Production company: Idiotlamp Productions

Original release
- Network: Netflix
- Release: 20 September 2019 – 16 September 2020

Related
- Criminal: France; Criminal: Germany; Criminal: Spain

Criminal: UK (or Criminal: United Kingdom) is a British police procedural television anthology series created by George Kay and Jim Field Smith, starring Katherine Kelly, Lee Ingleby, Mark Stanley, Rochenda Sandall and Shubham Saraf as the highly trained members of a special interrogative division of the Metropolitan Police. Netflix released the first series of three episodes on 20 September 2019 and a second series of four episodes on 16 September 2020.

It is part of Netflix's anthology series Criminal. The first series consisted of three episodes, the same as three other series with unrelated stories set in three countries and filmed in local languages: Criminal: France, Criminal: Spain, and Criminal: Germany.

The second series, which consisted of four episodes, received two nominations at the 2021 British Academy Television Awards: Best Supporting Actor for Kunal Nayyar and Best Supporting Actress for Sophie Okonedo.

== Premise ==
The show is set within the confines of a police interrogation room (and its viewing quarters) where a specialised interrogative unit of the Metropolitan Police engage in intense games of psychological cat-and-mouse with their suspects to find the answers that they need to close the case.

== Cast ==
=== Main cast ===
- Katherine Kelly – Detective Chief Inspector Natalie Hobbs, the head of the special interrogative unit.
- Lee Ingleby – Detective Inspector Tony Myerscough, Natalie's second-in-command and often the voice of reason, who nurses a secret crush on Natalie.
- Mark Stanley – Detective Constable Hugo Duffy, a talented but inexperienced interrogator with a hidden alcohol addiction.
- Rochenda Sandall – Detective Constable Vanessa Warren, an unambitious member of the team who prefers supporting background roles, as opposed to leading interviews.
- Shubham Saraf – Detective Constable Kyle Petit, the junior-most member of the unit, ostensibly hired for a secret training programme.
- Nicholas Pinnock – Detective Inspector Paul Ottager (series 1), a former member of the unit (and brief sexual partner of Natalie) who has now returned with a new rank.
- Aymen Hamdouchi – Detective Sergeant Jamie Reiss (series 2), a new member of the unit, hired to replace Paul after his offscreen departure at the end of series 1.

=== Guest cast ===
- David Tennant – Edgar Fallon, a doctor, accused of rape and murder (episode: "Edgar")
- Kit Harington – Alex, a real estate sales manager, accused of rape (episode: "Alex")
- Hayley Atwell – Stacey Doyle, an aggressive petty criminal, accused of murder (episode: "Stacey")
- Kunal Nayyar – Sandeep Singh, a convicted killer, accused of an additional murder (episode: "Sandeep")
- Sophie Okonedo – Julia Bryce, the long-suffering wife of a convicted murderer (episode: "Julia")
- Sharon Horgan – Danielle Dunne, the head of a vigilante group targeting online pedophiles (episode: "Danielle")
- Youssef Kerkour – Jamal "Jay" Muthassin, a truck driver accused of aiding human smuggling (episode: "Jay")
- Lolita Chakrabarti – Anita Baines, Edgar's solicitor (episode: "Edgar")
- Mark Quartley – Jeremy Nicholson, Stacey's solicitor (episode: "Stacey")
- Kevin Eldon – Michael Walker, Jay's solicitor (episode: "Jay")
- Rakhee Thakrar – Nasreen Shah, Julia's solicitor (episode: "Julia")
- Amanda Drew – Alex's solicitor (episode: "Alex")
- Jyuddah Jaymes – Henry Regis, Danielle's solicitor (episode: "Danielle")
- Annette Badland – Donna Swift, a senior prosecutor (episode: "Sandeep")
- Clare-Hope Ashitey – Sergeant Adele Addo, head of a search-and-rescue squad of the Metropolitan Police (episode: "Jay")
- Isabella Laughland – McRae, a member of Adele's team (episode: "Jay")

== Production ==
The first series was filmed at Netflix's production hub at Secuoya Studios, Ciudad de la Tele (Spanish for 'Television City') in Madrid. The same location was also used for Criminal: France, Criminal: Spain and Criminal: Germany. The second series was filmed at Shepperton Studios, London.

David Tennant, Hayley Atwell and Youssef Kerkour were featured as the Accused in series 1. In September 2020, Sophie Okonedo, Kit Harington, Sharon Horgan and Kunal Nayyar were announced as guest stars for the second series.

== Episodes ==
Series	Episodes	Originally released
1	3	20 September 2019
2	4	16 September 2020

=== Series 1 (2019) ===
No. overall	No. in season	Title	Directed by	Written by	Original release date
1	1	"Edgar"	Jim Field Smith	George Kay	20 September 2019
As time runs out, interrogators turn up the heat on a stone-faced doctor suspected of sexually assaulting and slaying his teenage stepdaughter.
2	2	"Stacey"	Jim Field Smith	George Kay	20 September 2019
With a shadowy colleague looking on, the team starts poking holes in the evolving story of a combative suspect accused of poisoning her sister's partner.
3	3	"Jay"	Jim Field Smith	George Kay	20 September 2019
The team badgers a stubborn truck driver to locate an abandoned trailer full of immigrants, but a new interrogator's poor decision jeopardises it all.

=== Series 2 (2020) ===
No. overall	No. in season	Title	Directed by	Written by	Original release date
4	1	"Julia"	Jim Field Smith	George Kay	16 September 2020
Called in one by one on a Sunday, the team risks a legal entanglement when a routine interview with a convicted killer's wife takes a provocative turn.
5	2	"Alex"	Jim Field Smith	George Kay	16 September 2020
With scarce evidence to guide them, the investigators question an arrogant businessman accused of rape by a woman who works for him.
6	3	"Danielle"	Jim Field Smith	George Kay	16 September 2020
Asking increasingly pointed questions, the team tries to crack a zealous defence put forth by the head of an online group that unmasks sexual predators.
7	4	"Sandeep"	Jim Field Smith	George Kay	16 September 2020
Confronted with a shrewd convicted killer wanting to cut a deal, the investigators gamble on calling in a disgraced former colleague to help.

== Release ==
Criminal: UK was released on 20 September 2019 on Netflix streaming. The second series was released on 16 September 2020.

== Reception ==
For series 1, review aggregator Rotten Tomatoes compiled 39 reviews, identified 85% of them as positive, and found an average rating of 7.32/10. The website's critics consensus states, "Though a bit uneven, Criminal's claustrophobic stylings and constantly twisting narratives pair nicely with its visual experiments, creating a crime drama that's equal parts creepy and captivating".
