= Criminal (franchise) =

Netflix police procedural anthology series

Criminal is a series of four police procedural anthology TV series, set in four countries, made for Netflix. The four series are Criminal: France, Criminal: Germany, Criminal: Spain, and Criminal: UK.

== Premise ==
Each episode is a stand-alone psychological drama, consisting of the interrogation of an individual by a team of police investigators. Every scene is confined to just three areas in a single location; a police interrogation room, a darkened viewing room that looks into the interrogation room through a one-way mirror, and the hallway and stairwell outside the rooms.

== Production ==
The series was devised by its showrunners George Kay and Jim Field Smith, and produced by their company Idiotlamp Productions.

Although the showrunners are based in the UK, each of the local three-part series (UK, France, Germany, and Spain) is written and performed in that country's native language by native actors, but all four individual local series were shot on the same set in Madrid, Spain.

== Release ==
All four series were released simultaneously in September 2019. A second series of Criminal: UK, consisting of four episodes, was released on 16 September 2020.

== Episodes ==
Series	Season	Episodes	Originally released
Criminal: France	1	3	20 September 2019
Criminal: Germany	1	3	20 September 2019
Criminal: Spain	1	3	20 September 2019
Criminal: UK	1	3	20 September 2019
Criminal: UK	2	4	16 September 2020

=== Criminal: France ===
No.	Title	Directed by	Written by	Original release date
1	"Émilie"	Frédéric Mermoud	Frédéric Mermoud & Mathieu Missoffe and George Kay	20 September 2019
2	"Caroline"	Frédéric Mermoud	Antonin Martin-Hilbert	20 September 2019
3	"Jérôme"	Frédéric Mermoud	Mathieu Missoffe	20 September 2019

=== Criminal: Germany ===
No.	Title	Directed by	Written by	Original release date
1	"Jochen"	Oliver Hirschbiegel	Bernd Lange	20 September 2019
2	"Yilmaz"	Oliver Hirschbiegel	Bernd Lange	20 September 2019
3	"Claudia"	Oliver Hirschbiegel	Sebastian Heeg and Bernd Lange	20 September 2019

=== Criminal: Spain ===
No.	Title	Directed by	Written by	Original release date
1	"Isabel"	Mariano Barroso	Alejandro Hernández	20 September 2019
2	"Carmen"	Mariano Barroso	Manuel Martín Cuenca	20 September 2019
3	"Carmelo"	Mariano Barroso	Alejandro Hernández	20 September 2019

=== Criminal: UK ===
==== Season 1 (2019) ====
No. overall	No. in season	Title	Directed by	Written by	Original release date
1	1	"Edgar"	Jim Field Smith	George Kay	20 September 2019
2	2	"Stacey"	Jim Field Smith	George Kay	20 September 2019
3	3	"Jay"	Jim Field Smith	George Kay	20 September 2019

==== Season 2 (2020) ====
No. overall	No. in season	Title	Directed by	Written by	Original release date
4	1	"Julia"	Jim Field Smith	George Kay	16 September 2020
5	2	"Alex"	Jim Field Smith	George Kay	16 September 2020
6	3	"Danielle"	Jim Field Smith	George Kay	16 September 2020
7	4	"Sandeep"	Jim Field Smith	George Kay	16 September 2020
