= Eric, Ernie and Me =

British TV film

- Written by: Neil Forsyth
- Directed by: Dan Zeff
- Starring: Stephen Tompkinson; Mark Bonnar; Neil Maskell; Liz White; Rufus Jones; Alex Macqueen
- Country of origin: United Kingdom
- Original language: English

Production
- Producers: Ben Farrell, Alison Sterling
- Running time: 60 minutes

Original release
- Network: BBC Four
- Release: 29 December 2017

Eric, Ernie and Me is a 2017 television film based on the relationship between British television double-act Morecambe and Wise and their writer Eddie Braben. It starred Stephen Tompkinson as Eddie Braben, Mark Bonnar as Eric Morecambe and Neil Maskell as Ernie Wise. It was written by Neil Forsyth. The one-off drama premiered on BBC Four on 29 December 2017.

== Production ==
Forsyth had the idea for the show after reading Braben's memoirs, The Book Wot I Wrote, and travelled to Pwhelli, North Wales to meet with Eddie's widow Dee. The Braben family subsequently gave their support to the project. Stephen Tompkinson, a lifelong fan of Braben's work, agreed to play the lead role. Mark Bonnar and Neil Maskell joined the cast as Morecambe and Wise, Liz White as Dee Braben and Rufus Jones as producer John Ammonds. The film was directed by Dan Zeff.

== Plotline ==
The film runs from 1969 to 1977. It shows Braben and Morecambe and Wise being put together by Bill Cotton, former Head of Light Entertainment at the BBC, and their changing relationship as they worked together at the BBC until 1977. It shows the pressure that Braben was put under as The Morecambe and Wise Show became the most popular television show in Britain, peaking at 28 million viewers for their 1977 Christmas show, and the two occasions when that pressure led to Braben leaving the show due to nervous exhaustion.

== Reception ==
Eric, Ernie and Me was very well received. The Observer said "what a lovely programme, rewatchable often", the Sunday Express called it "beautifully realised nostalgia" and The List said the film was "absorbing and heartfelt" and called Braben "one of British comedy's unsung heroes".

== Filming locations ==
Eric, Ernie and Me was shot in Bristol, Worthing and Cardiff.

== Awards ==
Eric, Ernie and Me was nominated for a number of awards including two Broadcasting Press Guild Awards, a Broadcast Digital Award and a Royal Television Society Award.

== Cast ==
- Stephen Tompkinson as Eddie Braben
- Mark Bonnar as Eric Morecambe
- Neil Maskell as Ernie Wise
- Liz White as Dee Braben
- Rufus Jones as John Ammonds
- Alex Macqueen as Bill Cotton
