= Gone (2026 TV series) =

British television series

- Genre: Crime drama
- Created by: George Kay
- Inspired by: To Hunt A KIller by Julie Mackay and Robert Murphy
- Written by: George Kay
- Directed by: Richard Laxton
- Starring: Eve Myles; David Morrissey
- Composer: Harry Escott
- Country of origin: United Kingdom
- Original language: English
- No. of series: 1
- No. of episodes: 6

Production
- Executive producers: George Kay; Willow Grylls; Matt Sandford
- Producer: Mark Hedges
- Production companies: New Pictures; Observatory Pictures

Original release
- Network: ITV1; ITVX
- Release: 8 March 2026 – present

Gone is a British television series created and written by George Kay that first broadcast on ITV1 and ITVX on 8 March 2026. The cast is led by Eve Myles and David Morrissey. In November 2026, the series was renewed for a second series.

== Premise ==
A headmaster becomes the prime suspect after the disappearance of his wife.

== Cast ==
=== Main ===
- Eve Myles as DS Annie Cassidy
- David Morrissey as Michael Polly
- Emma Appleton as Alana Polly
- Billy Barratt as Dylan Sedgwick
- Rupert Evans as Rory Bowman
- Claire Goose as Claire Sedgwick
- Clare Higgins as Carol Bradley
- Peter McDonald as DI Craig Stanhope
- Elliot Cowan as Stephen Sedgwick

=== Recurring ===
- Jennifer Macbeth as DS Becky Hammond
- Nicholas Nunn as Paul Whitchurch
- Jodie McNee as DC Nira Barker
- Oscar Batterham as DS Duncan Carmoody
- Arthur Hughes as DI Ivan Pemberley
- Hollie Bailey as Sarah Polly

== Production ==
The series is created and written by George Kay and is inspired by the book To Hunt A Killer by former detective superintendent for Gloucestershire Police, Julie Mackay, and ITV crime correspondent Robert Murphy, with both Mackay and Murphy consultants on the series.

Richard Laxton is director of the series, which is produced by Mark Hedges with executive producers including Kay, Willow Grylls and Matt Sandford. The series is a New Pictures and Observatory Pictures co-production for ITVX in association with All3Media International.

The cast is led by Eve Myles and David Morrissey, and also includes Emma Appleton, Jennifer Macbeth, Arthur Hughes, Nicholas Nunn Elliot Cowan, Billy Barratt, Rupert Evans, Jodie McNee, Oscar Batterham and Clare Higgins. Filming took place in Bristol. School scenes were filmed at Downside School, Somerset, over the Easter 2025 school holiday, and some pupils appeared as extras.

A second series was confirmed in November 2026, with Keeley Hawes joining Myles in the cast.

== Broadcast ==
The first series broadcast on 8 March 2026 with all episodes released the same day on ITVX.

== Reception ==
The review aggregator website Rotten Tomatoes reported a 100% approval rating, from 12 reviews.

The Guardian describes the series as a taut, suspenseful and engrossing drama. The Daily Telegraph describe it as a "a pleasingly straightforward thriller", praising a performance of great intensity by Morrissey.
