= Clare-Hope Ashitey =

British actress (born 1987)

- Born: Clare-Hope Naa K. Ashitey; 12 February 1987 (age 39); Enfield, London, England
- Education: Latymer School; SOAS, University of London (2009)
- Occupation: Actress
- Years active: 2005–present
- Known for: Children of Men, Seven Seconds

Clare-Hope Ashitey (born 12 February 1987) is a British actress. She attended the Centre Stage School of Performing Arts, Southgate while being educated at The Latymer School, in the Edmonton area of London, for seven years.

She took a gap year between school and university to work on the film Children of Men (2006). In 2018, she starred in the Netflix Original crime drama series Seven Seconds.

== Early life and education ==
Ashitey was born in Enfield to Tina, a medical secretary, and Paul, a dentist, who are both from Ghana. She has an older sister, Grace, who studied at the University of Warwick, and an older brother. Ashitey attended Brimsdown primary school in Brimsdown, Enfield before being educated at The Latymer School in Edmonton, North London. She graduated in anthropology from SOAS, University of London in 2009.

== Filmography ==
=== Film ===
| Year | Title | Role | Notes |
|---|---|---|---|
| 2005 | Shooting Dogs | Marie | |
| 2006 | Children of Men | Kee | |
| 2007 | Exodus | Zipporah | |
| 2011 | Black Brown White | Jackie | |
| 2012 | Candle to Water | Shona | |
| 2013 | All Is by My Side | Faye | |
| 2016 | The White King | Gaby | |
| 2016 | I.T. | Joan | |
| 2022 | The Rainbow Prince | Princess Marea | Short film |

=== Television ===
| Year | Title | Role | Notes |
|---|---|---|---|
| 2010 | Coming Up | Helen | 1 episode |
| 2011, 2019 | Top Boy | Taylor | 5 episodes; series 1 and 3 |
| 2012 | Mrs Biggs | Receptionist | 1 episode |
| 2014–2016 | Suspects | DC Charlie Steele | 23 episodes |
| 2015–2017 | Doctor Foster | Carly | 6 episodes |
| 2017 | Master of None | Sara | 1 episode |
| 2017 | Shots Fired | Kerry Beck | Main cast |
| 2018 | Seven Seconds | K.J. Harper | Main cast |
| 2019 | Criminal: UK | D.S. Adele Addo | Episode: "Jay" |
| 2019 | The Feed | Evelyn Kern | Main cast |
| 2020 | Death in Paradise | Alesha Williams | 1 Episode |
| 2020 | Doctor Who | Rakaya | Episode: "Can You Hear Me?" |
| 2021 | Riviera | Ellen Swann | Main cast |
| 2023 | Funny Woman | Diane Lewis | 5 episodes |
| 2023 | On the Edge | Bella | 1 episode |
| 2024 | Constellation | Agent Bright | 2 episodes |
| 2025 | The Wheel of Time | Alviarin Freidhen | Season 3, 4 episodes |
| 2026 | Hijack | Olivia Thatcher | Season 2, 8 episodes |

=== Theatre ===
| Year | Title | Role | Venue | Notes |
|---|---|---|---|---|
| 2009 | Origin of the Species | Victoria | Arcola Theatre, London | |

=== Video games ===
| Year | Game | Voice role | Notes |
|---|---|---|---|
| 2021 | The Last Worker | Hoverbird | Voice only |
