= Litvinenko (TV series) =

British Television series

- Genre: Drama
- Written by: George Kay
- Directed by: Jim Field Smith
- Starring: David Tennant; Mark Bonnar; Margarita Levieva; Neil Maskell
- Composer: Gabriel Prokofiev
- Original language: English
- No. of episodes: 4

Production
- Executive producers: Patrick Spence; Josephine Zapata Genetay; Lucy Bedford; George Kay; Jim Field Smith; David Tennant
- Producers: Chris May; Richard Kerbaj
- Cinematography: Ed Moore
- Editors: David Webb, Robert Frost
- Production companies: ITV Studios; Tiger Aspect; Viaplay; Livedrop

Original release
- Network: ITV; ITVX
- Release: 15 December 2022

Litvinenko is a 2022 four-part British television mini-series based on real events, about the 2006 poisoning of Alexander Litvinenko in London. It stars David Tennant as Litvinenko and Margarita Levieva as his wife Marina Litvinenko. Made for ITVX by Tiger Aspect, the series was directed by Jim Field Smith, and written by George Kay. It premiered on 15 December 2022.

== Synopsis ==
The series is a dramatisation of the 10-year fight of Marina Litvinenko and the London police force as they work to prove the guilt and release the names of those responsible for the 2006 poisoning of Alexander Litvinenko.

== Cast ==
- David Tennant as Alexander Litvinenko
- Margarita Levieva as Marina Litvinenko
- Mark Bonnar as Detective Superintendent Clive Timmons, Metropolitan Police
- Neil Maskell as Detective Inspector Brent Hyatt, Metropolitan Police
- Stephen Campbell Moore as Ben Emmerson, KC
- Simon Paisley Day as Sir John Scarlett
- Daniel Ryan as DAC Peter Clarke, Metropolitan Police
- Barry Sloane as Detective Sergeant Jim Dawson, Metropolitan Police
- Sam Troughton as Detective Inspector Brian Tarpey, Metropolitan Police
- Kirsten Foster as Jenny Hyatt, wife of Brian Hyatt
- Radosław Kaim as Andrey Lugovoy
- Simon Haines as Dr Benjamin Swift
- Maggie Evans as Professor Pat Troop
- Nikolai Tsankov as Boris Berezovsky
- Sam Marks as Detective Constable Oliver Gadney, Metropolitan Police
- Mark Ivanir as Alexander Goldfarb
- Zoe Telford as Ingrid Campbell
- Joanna Kanska as Nika Privalova
- Selina Cadell as Louise Christiansen

== Episodes ==
| No. | Title | Directed by | Written by | Original release date |
|---|---|---|---|---|
| 1 | Episode 1 | Jim Field Smith | George Kay | December 15, 2022 |
| 2 | Episode 2 | Jim Field Smith | George Kay | December 15, 2022 |
| 3 | Episode 3 | Jim Field Smith | George Kay | December 15, 2022 |
| 4 | Episode 4 | Jim Field Smith | George Kay | December 15, 2022 |

== Production ==
In September 2021 it was announced that Tennant and Margarita Levieva were to take on the roles of Alexander and Marina Litvinenko for ITV and Nordic Entertainment Group from a script from George Kay, with Tiger Aspect also producing. Jim Field Smith was announced as director with Neil Maskell and Mark Bonnar appearing as the police officers who interviewed Litvinenko in his hospital bed. Tennant met with Marina Litvinenko and said he felt a responsibility to her, saying, “it’s so relevant to the world we live in what happened to that man and the things that he spent his life talking about and that his wife Marina, who is an extraordinary human, is still doing. The reason we tell that story is because it’s so raw and vivid and important.” Filming took place in London from October 2021.

To air in conjunction with the series, ITV commissioned Firecracker Films to produce an hour-long film detailing the events of the Polonium-210 poisoning of Litvinenko in 2006, including an interview with Marina Litvinenko, Assistant Commissioner for the Metropolitan Police Andy Hayman and James Cairns, who was the Police Radiation Protection Advisor.

== Broadcast ==
In March 2022 the project was announced to be included in the productions set to be launched in the UK on the new for 2022 ITV streaming service ITVX. In October 2022, it was announced the project had also been sold internationally to more than 80 international markets, including Seven Network in Australia, Stockholm based Viaplay and their streaming service in the Nordics, Netherlands, Poland and the Baltics, and TVNZ in New Zealand, with AMC+ having exclusive rights in the US, and Amazon Prime Video in Canada. The series premiered on ITVX on 15 December 2022.

== Reception ==
=== Critical reception ===
On the review aggregator website Rotten Tomatoes, Litvinenko holds an approval rating of 64%.

=== Accolades ===
In November 2023, David Tennant was nominated in the Best Actor category at the TV Choice Awards for his work on the series.

Samantha Kininmonth and Suzi Battersby were nominated in the Best Make Up Design - Scripted category at the 2023 Royal Television Society Craft & Design Awards.
