= Eva Meckbach =

German actress (born 1981)

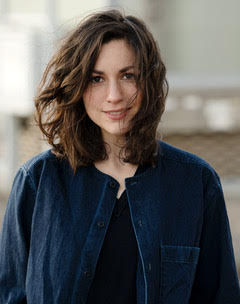
- Born: 26 January 1981 (age 45); Seeheim-Jugenheim, Hesse, West Germany
- Occupation: Actress

Eva Meckbach (born 26 January 1981) is a German actress.

== Early life ==
Meckbach was born in Seeheim-Jugenheim and grew up in Heidenheim an der Brenz.

== Career ==
From 2000 to 2001, Meckbach took part in the Theaterprojekt Theater Total project in Bochum. From 2003 to 2006, She received her acting training at the Berlin University of the Arts. From 2006 to 2019, she was part of the permanent ensemble of Schaubühne. In 2015, Meckbach and the ensemble for the play Tartuffe, staged by Michael Thalheimer, received the Golden Mask and the Prix de critique de L'Association québécoise des critiques de théatre (Montreal 2015).

In 2012, Meckbach starred in the drama film Home for the Weekend with Bernd Lange. In 2019, she took on one of the leading roles in the Netflix series Criminal: Germany.

== Other work ==
Meckbach also works regularly as an audio book speaker. In 2019, she was awarded the Deutscher Hörbuchpreis as best interpreter for the audio book of Deutsches Haus by the author Annette Hess.

== Personal life ==
On 5 February 2021, as part of the #ActOut initiative in SZ-Magazin, Meckbach came out as lesbian.
