= Legal Crime =

1997 video game

- Developer: Byte Enchanters
- Publisher: Byte Enchanters
- Platform: Windows
- Release: 1997
- Mode: Multiplayer

Legal Crime is an online real-time strategy video game from Finnish studio Byte Enchanters.

== Gameplay ==
Legal Crime is a fast-paced online strategy game that involves players in the ruthless world of organized crime. The gameplay allows multiplayer mode, where 2 to 12 players compete in chaotic matches filled with betrayal and surprise attacks. A community emerged, with over 600 players forming crime families led by Dons, engaging in clan-style warfare. Formal alliances allow players to coordinate tactics, avoid friendly fire, and share resources. An independent ranking ladder tracks over 200 players, offering the chance to rise through the criminal hierarchy. The single-player mode includes a dozen tutorial scenarios to teach mechanics and tactics.

== Development ==
The game was in development for two and a half years.

== Reception ==
Reception

Review scores
Publication	Score
Computer Games Magazine	4/5
Gambler	83%

Computer Games Magazine gave the game a score of 4 out of 5 stating "If you've burned out on the RTS game du' jour and are looking for a change then give Legal Crime a whirl. Perhaps you'll rise through the ranks to head your own family, and manage to claw your way to the top of ladder…then again you might just get gunned down in the street…either way it's fun"

Games Domain said "Legal Crime sets a standard that all multiplayer games should strive for. Superb replayability with an elegant and user friendly design."
