= Oliver Hirschbiegel =

German film director (born 1957)

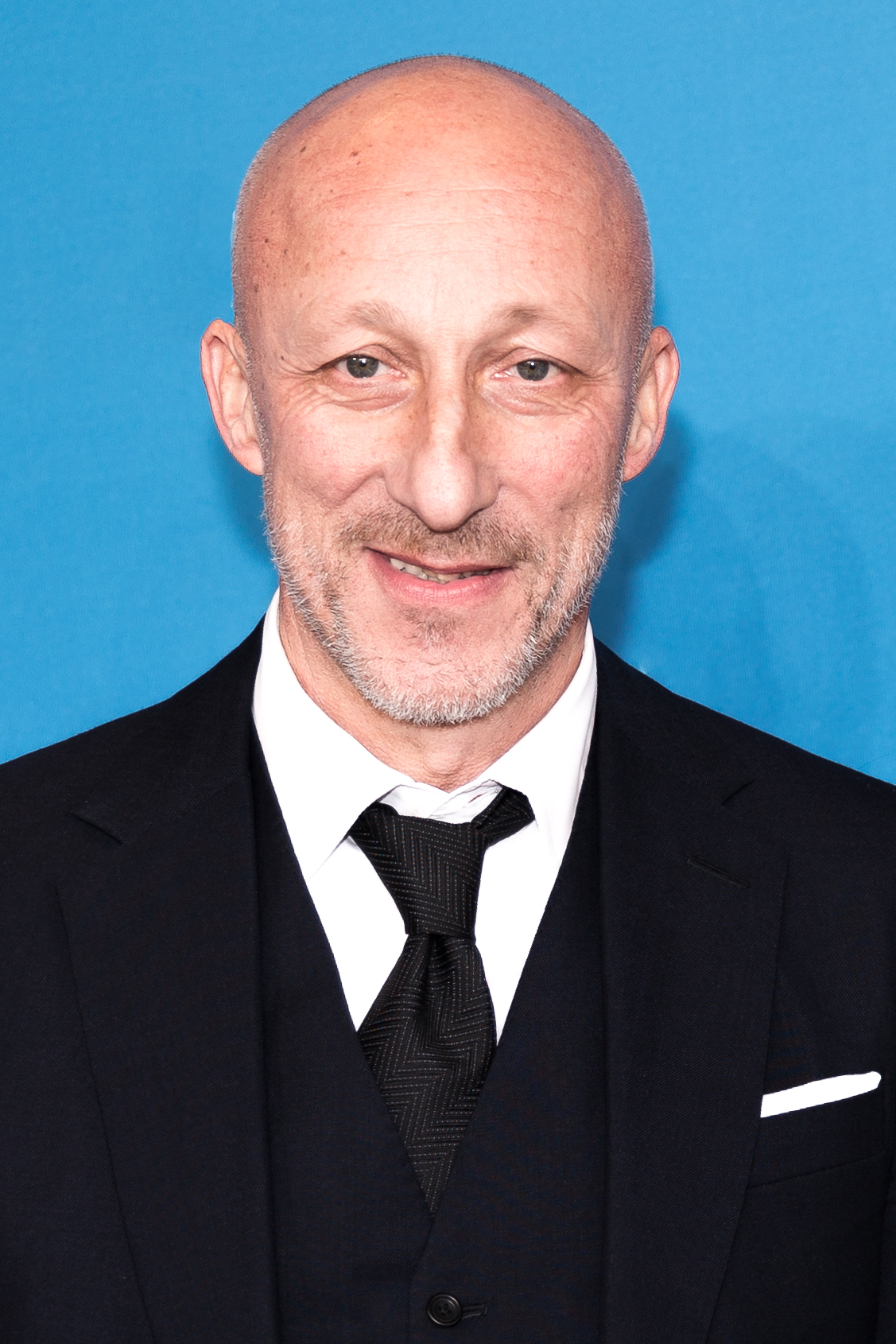
- Hirschbiegel at the Berlinale 2017
- Born: 29 December 1957 (age 68); Hamburg, West Germany
- Occupation: Film director
- Years active: 1986–present

Oliver Hirschbiegel (born 29 December 1957) is a German film and television director. His feature works include the award-winning Das Experiment and the Oscar-nominated film about Adolf Hitler, Downfall. His television work includes the German series 4 Blocks, Netflix's Criminal: Germany and Apple TV's Constellation.

== Early life and education ==
Oliver Hirschbiegel was born in Hamburg, West Germany on 29 December 1957.

A Waldorf graduate, Hirschbiegel studied painting and graphic arts, later film, at the Hamburg University of Fine Arts.

== Career ==
In 1986, Oliver directed his first film, the made-for-television movie Das Go! Projekt. He became a successful TV director, directing numerous episodes of the Tatort and Kommissar Rex series.

His first theatrical release was the critically acclaimed movie Das Experiment (2001). The film received positive reviews and 14 film awards, with a further 14 nominations. Oliver was awarded 'Best Director' at Montreal and Istanbul Film Festivals for the film.

In 2004, he attracted world-wide attention with the film Der Untergang (released in English-speaking countries as Downfall), starring Bruno Ganz as Adolf Hitler during his last days. The film was a critical and commercial success, winning numerous awards and a nomination for the Academy Award for the best foreign film. One scene from the film has become the basis for a widespread viral video phenomenon. The film sparked an extensive debate in Germany over the portrayal of Nazi leaders. Before directing the film, he was in talks to direct Blade: Trinity.

In 2009, Oliver directed the British film Five Minutes of Heaven starring Liam Neeson and James Nesbit which won him 'Best Director' for International Drama at Sundance Film Festival and was nominated for a BAFTA as 'Best Single Drama'.

He directed his first Hollywood feature The Invasion, which was partly re-shot by Australian director James McTeigue, at the request of the studio.. Oliver directed the 2013 biographical film Diana, about Diana, Princess of Wales, which was released in September 2013. Actress Naomi Watts plays the title role.

His film 13 Minutes was selected to be screened out of competition at the 65th Berlin International Film Festival in 2015 and won 'Best Film' at the Munich Film Festival.

Oliver has also had an extensive career in television, directing series including Borgias, the German series 4 Blocks which saw him nominated for a Romy for 'Best TV Direction', Netflix's Criminal: Germany and Apple TV's Constellation. In 2023, Oliver's episode Der Taucher of the German anthology series Strafe was nominated for Best Single Episode at Cannesseries Festival.

== Filmography ==
=== Television ===
TV movies

Year	Title	Director	Writer
1986	Das Go! Projekt	Yes	Yes
1991	Murderous Decisions	Yes	No
1997	Das Urteil	Yes	No
1997	Baby Rex - Der kleine Kommissar	Yes	No
1997	Trickser	Yes	No
1998	Todfeinde - Die falsche Entscheidung	Yes	Yes

TV series

Year	Title	Director	Writer	Notes
1992-2021	Tatort	Yes	No	3 episodes
1994-1997	Inspector Rex	Yes	Yes	Directed 14 episodes
2011	Borgia	Yes	No	4 episodes
2014	Turn: Washington's Spies	Yes	No	Episode "The Battle of Setauket"
2017	Billions	Yes	No	Episode "The Kingmaker"
2018	4 Blocks	Yes	No	3 episodes
2022	Strafe	Yes	Yes	Episode "Der Taucher"
2024	Constellation	Yes	No	3 episodes

Miniseries

- The Same Sky (2017)
- Criminal: Germany (2019)
- Unwanted - Ostaggi del mare (2023)

=== Feature film ===
- Das Experiment (2001)
- My Last Film (2001)
- Downfall (2004)
- Just an Ordinary Jew (2005)
- The Invasion (2009)
- Five Minutes of Heaven (2009)
- Diana ((2013)
- 13 Minutes (2015)
- Der Maler (2021) (Also producer)
- Yellow (2024) (Also writer)

== Awards and nominations ==
Wins

- 1998 RTL Golden Lion Awards, Best Direction of a TV Film or Series for "Das Urteil" and "Trickser"
- 1998 Adolf Grimme Awards, Audience Award of the 'Marl Group' for "Das Urteil"
- 1999 Bavarian Film Awards for Directing "Mortal Friends"
- 2001 Bergen International Film Festival Audience Award for "Das Experiment"
- 2001 Bavarian Film Awards, Best Direction for Das Experiment
- 2001 Montréal World Film Festival Best Director, "Das Experiment"
- 2002 Istanbul International Film Festival, People's Choice Award, "Das Experiment"
- 2004 Bambi Awards Film – National, "Downfall"
- 2005 Bavarian Film Awards Audience Award for "Downfall"
- 2005 Amanda Awards Best Foreign Feature Film (Årets utenlandske kinofilm), "Downfall"
- 2006 Bodil Awards Best Non-American Film (Bedste ikke-amerikanske film), "Downfall"
- 2006 Fajr International Film Festival International Competition – Best Technical or Artistic Achievement, "Downfall"
- 2006 Robert Award Best Non-American Film (Årets ikke-amerikanske film), "Downfall"
- 2009 Prix Europa Special Commendation – TV Fiction "Five Minutes of Heaven"
- 2009 Sundance Film Festival Directing Award, World Cinema, Dramatic – "Five Minutes of Heaven"
- 2015 Munich Film Festival Best Film, "13 Minutes"

Nominations

- 1998 Adolf Grimme Awards Adolf Grimme Award, Fiction/Entertainment – "Das Urteil"
- 2001 European Film Awards Audience Award, Best Director, "Das Experiment"
- 2002 Fantasporto International Fantasy Film Award, Best Film, "Das Experiment"
- 2003 Paris Film Festival Grand Prix, "Das Experiment"
- 2005 Mar del Plata Film Festival Best Film, "Downfall"
- 2005 Academy Awards Best Foreign Language Film of the Year
- 2006 Goya Awards Best European Film (Mejor Película Europea), "Downfall"
- 2006 Argentinean Film Critics Association Awards Best Foreign Film, Not in the Spanish Language (Mejor Película Extranjera), "Downfall"
- 2009 Sundance Film Festival Grand Jury Prize, World Cinema – Dramatic, "Five Minutes of Heaven"
- 2010 Broadcasting Press Guild Awards Broadcasting Press Guild Award, Best Single Drama, "Five Minutes of Heaven"
- 2019 Romy Best TV Direction, "4Blocks"
- 2023 Cannesseries Festival Best Single Episode, "Der Taucher - Strafe"
