= Convict (disambiguation) =

A convict is an individual who has been found guilty of a crime.

Convict or Convicts or The Convict may also refer to:

== Arts, entertainment, and media ==
- Convicts (film), a 1991 film starring Robert Duvall
- The Convict (1910 film), an American silent short comedy
- The Convict (1951 film), a French drama film
- Convicts (band), American hip-hop band
- Convicts (Convicts album), 1991
- Convicts (You Am I album), 2006
- The Convict (TV series), a Polish crime drama series
- "The Convict", an episode of The Office (U.S. version)
- The Convict, an episode of Matlock

== Other uses ==
- The Convict, the later ring name for professional wrestler Kevin Wacholz
- The Convict, early 1970s ring name of another professional wrestler Stanley C. Frazier, best known as Uncle Elmer
- Convict cichlid, a species of fish
- Convicted felon, one who has been convicted of a felony crime in a court of law

== See also ==
- Konvict, an alias of Akon's
- Konvict Muzik, a record label owned and founded by Melvin Brown and Akon
