= RTL Crime =

RTL Crime may refer to:

- RTL Crime (Croatian TV channel), the TV channel broadcasting in Croatia
- RTL Crime (Dutch TV channel), the TV channel broadcasting in the Netherlands
- RTL Crime (German TV channel), the TV channel broadcasting in Germany

== See also ==
- RTL Group
