= Neil Maskell =

English actor, writer and director

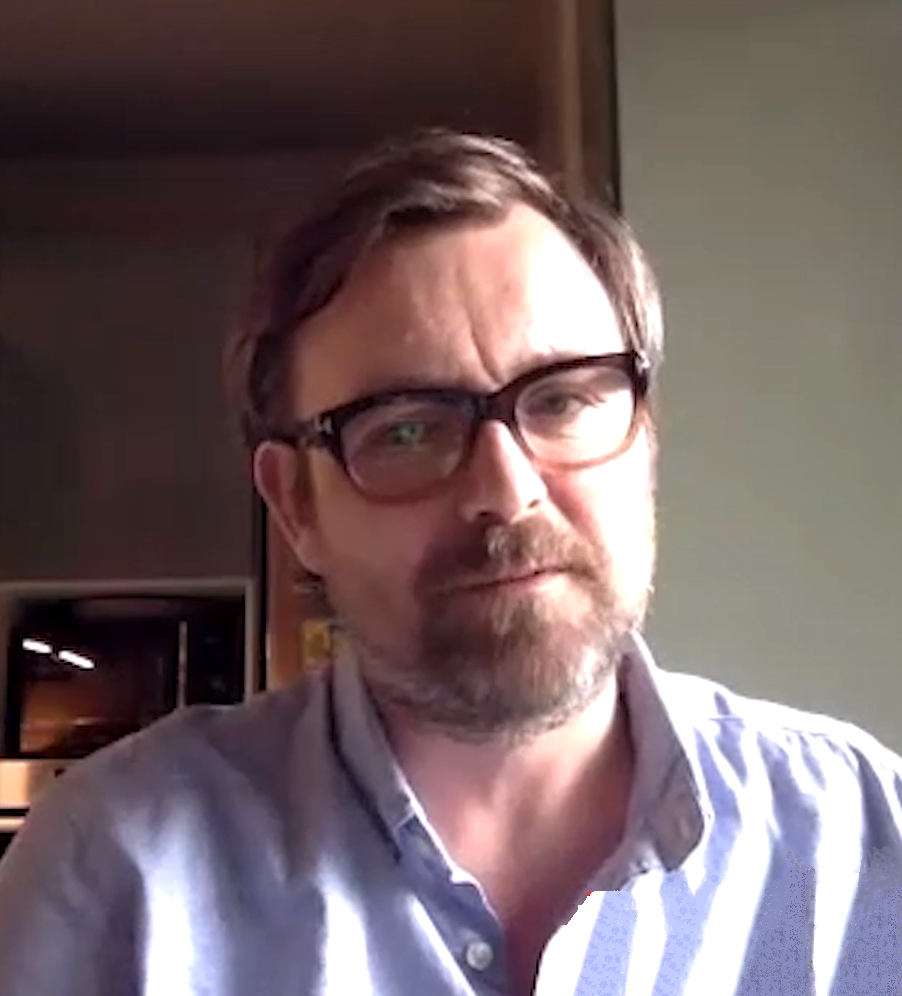
- Maskell in 2022
- Born: 1976 (age 49–50); London, England
- Education: North West Kent College
- Occupations: Actor; writer; director
- Years active: 1991–present

Neil Maskell (born 1976) is an English actor, writer and director who is known for his appearances in British crime and horror films, and for his role as Arby in the British TV show Utopia. His credits include Nil by Mouth (1997), The Football Factory (2004), Rise of the Footsoldier (2007), Doghouse (2009), Bonded by Blood (2010), Kill List (2011), Wild Bill (2011), The Great Train Robbery (2013), Raised by Wolves (2015), The Mummy (2017), King Arthur: Legend of the Sword (2017), Peaky Blinders (2019), Litvinenko (2022), Hijack (2023), and The Witness (2026).

== Early life and education ==
Neil Maskell was born in 1976 in London.

As a youth, he played football for Long Lane JFC as a full back. He first trained in acting at the Anna Scher Theatre in Islington, London, where he attended classes from the age of 11, and studied at the Miskin Theatre, Dartford at North West Kent College from 1992. He later worked as a director at the Miskin Theatre.

== Career ==
=== Film ===
Maskell's film career began in 1997 with an appearance as Schmuddie in Gary Oldman's directorial debut Nil by Mouth which was Nominated for a Palme d'Or (Golden Palm) for best film at the 1998 Cannes Film Festival. In 2004, he appeared as Rod, best friend and sidekick of Tommy, (played by Danny Dyer), in the British hooligan film The Football Factory, which also starred Tamer Hassan, Frank Harper, and Roland Manookian.

In 2007, he was in the British gangster movie Rise of the Footsoldier, also starring Craig Fairbrass and Terry Stone. In 2009, he appeared as Banksy in the comedy zombie film Doghouse, alongside Stephen Graham and Danny Dyer.

His leading role in the 2011 thriller Kill List (2011), attracted positive reviews from critics earning many nominations for the Best Actor, including at the British Independent Film Awards. In 2011, he also starred in Wild Bill, in a cast which included Charlie Creed-Miles, Will Poulter, Leo Gregory, Liz White, Iwan Rheon, Olivia Williams, Jaime Winstone, Andy Serkis, and Sean Pertwee. The film received positive reviews.

In 2021, Maskell played the titular and lead character in British gangster revenge film Bull, with Tamzin Outhwaite.

=== Television ===
Maskell's first television appearance was in 1991 in the ITV police drama The Bill. Between 1992 and 2002, he made a further five appearances on the show, portraying a different character each time. He has had one-off roles in a number of other popular British serial dramas such as Casualty, London's Burning, Soldier Soldier. His most regular television roles have been in the 2005 comedy series Mike Bassett: Manager, in the comedy sketch show The Wrong Door, and in the 2013–2014 thriller drama action series Utopia. Since 2015, he has been a series regular in sci-fi thriller Humans. In 2019 Maskell played prime minister Winston Churchill in the series finale of Peaky Blinders.

Between 2018 and 2020 he played the recurring character Winkle in the BBC One sitcom King Gary, friend and employee of the titular character played by Tom Davis. Maskell has previously worked with Davis in Murder in Successville (where he played Frankie Boyle in one episode),The Warm-Up Guy and The Morgana Show.

In 2022, Maskell played Detective Inspector Brent Hyatt in the ITV drama, Litvinenko, detailing the final days and subsequent murder investigation into the death of Russian defector Alexander Litvinenko.

In 2023, Maskell played a terrorist in the Apple TV+ aircraft thriller series Hijack, alongside Idris Elba and Eve Myles. In 2026, he plays DI Keith Pedder in the Netflix true crime drama miniseries The Witness.

== Personal life ==
Maskell is a supporter of Arsenal.

== Filmography ==
=== Film ===
Year	Title	Role	Notes
1996	Monkey Stacks	Self - Voice	Documentary
1997	Nil by Mouth	Schmuddie	
1997	Crocodile Snap	Ray	Short film
1998	Titanic Town	Soldier	
2000	Sorted	Record Shop Geezer	
2001	Redemption Road	Leading Mugger	
2002	AKA	Marcus	
2003	The Sequel	Lenny	Short film
2004	The Football Factory	Rod	
2004	It's All Gone Pete Tong	Jack Stoddart	
2004	Fat Slags	Policeman	
2006	Basic Instinct 2	Detective Ferguson	
2007	The Englishman	John	
2007	Rise of the Footsoldier	Darren Nicholls	
2007	Atonement	Soldier in Bray Bar	
2007	True Colours	Neil	Short film
2009	Paintball	Frank	
2009	Tony	Mike Hemmings	
2009	Doghouse	Banksy	
2010	The Shouting Men	Terry	
2010	Tricky: Murder Weapon	(unknown)	Short film
2010	Bonded by Blood	Craig Rolfe	
2010	Shitkicker	–	Short film. Writer & director
2011	Kill List	Jay	
2011	Jack Falls	Sid	
2011	Jack Falls: Sid's Story	Sid	Animated short film
2011	Ghosted	Nathan	
2011	Turnout	Scott	
2011	Wild Bill	Dickie	
2011	Will	Lenny	
2011	How to Stop Being a Loser	Hands Henry	
2012	Piggy	John	
2012	Pusher	Marlon	
2012	St George's Day	Jimmy McCudden	
2012	The Rise	Steven Roper	Titled Wasteland in North America
2012	The ABCs of Death	Lord Scanlon	Segment 'U Is for Unearthed'
2012	It Follows Me Around	Dad	Short films
2012	Driftwood	Father	Short films
2013	Turncoat	Jimmy Parton	Short films
2013	All Things to All Men	Luke Nelson	
2014	Evil Never Dies	Sean McCann	Originally titled The Haunting of Harry Payne
2014	Open Windows	Chord	
2014	Hyena	Martin	
2014	Instruments of Darkness	Kern	Short films
2015	Strange Weather	Dave	Short films
2015	Bone in the Throat	Lewis	
2015	High-Rise	PC White	
2016	Level Up	Dmitri	
2017	Judgement	Tom	Short film. Also producer
2017	The Mummy	Dr. Whemple	
2017	King Arthur: Legend of the Sword	Back Lack	
2018	In Darkness	DI Oscar Mills	
2018	Happy New Year, Colin Burstead	Colin	
2018	Blood, Sweat and Terrors	Jimmy Parton	Segment 'Turncoat'
2018	Little Monster	Harry	Short films
2018	Dodgy Dave	Dave	Short films
2018	The Departure	David	Short films
2019	The Bookshop	Man	Short films
2020	Red, White and Blue	Inspector Willis	The 3rd of 5 films from the Small Axe anthology series
2021	Bull	Bull	
2022	Klokkenluider	–	Writer & director
TBA	Straight Circle	Noll	Post-production

=== Television ===
Year	Title	Role	Notes
1991	The Bill	Billy Potter	Series 7; episode 58: "Joey"
1992	The Bill	Gary	Series 8; episode 97: "Fireworks"
1992	Perfect Scoundrels	Dean	Series 3; episode 5: "Let No Man Put Asunder"
1994	EastEnders	Youth	1 episode
1995	The Bill	Damien Burns	Series 11; episode 82: "Over the Top"
1995	It Could Be You	Youth	Television film
1996	Soldier Soldier	Para 1	Series 6; episode 7: "Money for Nothing"
1996	London's Burning	Gary	Series 9; episode 8
1996	The Thin Blue Line	Gosforth FC Player	Series 2; episode 5: "Come on You Blues"
1997	Casualty	Luke Lowther	Series 11; episode 21: "United... By Blood"
1997	The Bill	Warren Heskey	Series 13; episode 93: "Neighbours"
1997	Chalk	Arse Face	Series 1; episode 5: "The Inspection"
1997	Wycliffe	Tully	Series 4; episode 8: "Old Crimes, New Times"
1998	Wavelength	Phil	Series 2; episode 1: "Mixed Messages"
1998	Bramwell	Manky Matkin	Series 4; episode 1: "Our Brave Boys"
1998	Ultraviolet	Neil	Episode 2: "In Nomine Patris"
1999	The Bill	Frank Wilson	Series 15; episode 48: "Screwdriver"
1999	The Murder of Stephen Lawrence	Gary Dobson	Television film
1999	Murder Most Horrid	Martin Greaves	Series 4; episode 3: "Whoopi Stone"
2000	Silent Witness	Gary Lomax	Series 5; episode 1: "The World Cruise: Part 1"
2000	Nature Boy	Jimmy	Mini-series; episode 4
2000	Killers	(unknown)	Television short film
2000	Never Never	Conrad	Episodes 1 & 2
2002	The Jury	Chris Maher	Series 1; episodes 1–6
2002	The Bill	Gary Roach	Series 18; episode 24: "Needle in a Haystack"
2002	Bodily Harm	Danny Peters	Mini-series; episode 1
2003	Strange	Youth	Episode 5: "Dubik"
2004	Shameless	Corporal	Series 2; episode: "Christmas at Chatsworth"
2005	The Inspector Lynley Mysteries	Martin Moran	Series 4; episode 4: "Word of God"
2005	Mike Bassett: Manager	Wirral Web Presenter	Episodes 1–6
2007	Casualty	Tom Faulkner	Series 21; episode 43: "It Never Rains..."
2008	He Kills Coppers	Shawn	3-part television film
2008	The Wrong Door	(unknown)	Episodes 2–5
2009	Casualty	Lenny	Series 23; episodes 47 & 48: "No Fjords in Finland: Parts 1 & 2"
2010	The Morgana Show	Norman	Episodes 1–5
2011	Comedy Lab	Andrew	Series 12; episode 5: "The Warm-Up Guy"
2012	Silent Witness	Stuart Thompson	Series 15; episodes 7 & 8: "Domestic: Parts 1 & 2"
2012	Them from That Thing	Various characters	Mini-series; episodes 1 & 2
2012	Comedy Blaps	(voice)	Series 2; episode 9: "The Adventures of Robin of Essex in The New Set of Feathers"
2013	Dates	Nick	Episode 2: "Jenny & Nick"
2013	Run	Kieran	Mini-series; episode 1: "Carol"
2013	Privado	Michael Jackson	Mini-series; episodes 1–3: "Theft", "More Theft" & "No More Theft"
2013	By Any Means	Joe Tyrus	Mini-series; episode 2
2013	The Great Train Robbery	Buster Edwards	Mini-series; episodes 1 & 2: "A Robber's Tale" & "A Copper's Tale"
2013–2014	Utopia	Arby / Piètre	Series 1 & 2; 11 episodes
2013–2014	The Mimic	Neil	Series 1 & 2; 11 episodes
2015–2016	Raised by Wolves	Michael	Series 1; episodes 4 & 6, & series 2; episode 4
2015–2016	Humans	DS/DI Pete Drummond	Series 1 & 2; 14 episodes
2016	Drunk History: UK	King Henry VIII	Series 2; episode 9: "Battle of Hastings / Catherine Parr"
2016	Murder in Successville	Frankie Boyle	Series 2; episode 2: "Miranda"
2017	Unspeakable	Des	Television film
2017	Eric, Ernie and Me	Ernie Wise	Television film
2018	Strike	Donald Laing / Ray Williams	Series 3; episode 2: "Career of Evil: Part 2"
2018	No Offence	Dennis Caddy	Series 3; episodes 1–6
2018–2020	King Gary	Winkle	Series 1 & 2; 8 episodes
2019	Cleaning Up	Warren	Episodes 1–6
2019–2021	Peaky Blinders	Winston Churchill	Series 5; episodes 4 & 6, & series 6; episode 2
2020	Sex Education	Police Officer 'Neil'	Series 2; episode 3
2020	Baghdad Central	Douglas Evans	Episodes 3–6
2021	Intergalactic	Sergeant Wendell	Episodes 1–3
2022	Stuck	Dr. Pete Cosmos	4 episodes
2022	Litvinenko	DI Brent Hyatt	Episodes 1–4
2023	Hijack	Stuart Atterton	Main role. Series 1; episodes 1–7
2024	The Bay	Steve Dawson	Series 5; episodes 1–6
2025	The Hack	Glen Campbell	Miniseries
2026	The Witness	DI Keith Pedder	Miniseries

== Awards and nominations ==
Year	Award	Category	Nominated work	Result	Ref.
2011	Dublin Film Critics' Circle Awards	Best Actor	Kill List	Nominated	
2011	British Independent Film Awards	BIFA for Best Actor	Kill List	Nominated	
2012	Fright Meter Awards	Best Actor	Kill List	Nominated	
2013	Fangoria Chainsaw Awards	Best Actor	Kill List	Nominated	
2013	Southampton International Film Festival	Best Supporting Actor in a Short Film	Driftwood	Nominated	
2014	BloodGuts UK Horror Awards	Best Supporting Actor/Actress	Open Windows	Nominated	
2022	National Film Awards UK	Best Actor	Bull	Nominated	
