= Mark Bonnar =

Scottish actor (born 1968)

- Born: Richard Mark Bonnar; 19 November 1968 (age 57); Edinburgh, Scotland
- Occupation: Actor
- Years active: 2001–present
- Spouse: Lucy Gaskell (m. 2007)
- Children: 2

Richard Mark Bonnar (born 19 November 1968) is a Scottish actor. He is known for his roles as Max in Guilt, Duncan Hunter in Shetland, Bruno Jenkins in Casualty, Detective Finney in Psychoville, DCC Mike Dryden in Line of Duty, Colin Osborne in Unforgotten, Blackbeard in Assassin's Creed IV: Black Flag, The Eleven in various Doctor Who Big Finish Productions audio dramas (2015-Present), Townsend in Battlefield 1, Field in Summer of Rockets and Stephen Burns, the Lord Advocate, in Dept. Q.

== Career ==
On television, Bonnar has appeared as Peter Mayhew in BBC One's New Blood and Chris in the Channel 4 comedy Catastrophe, a role which he reprised in the following series. He also portrays the Rev. Adam Collingbourne in ITV's Home Fires, John Halliday in Undercover, as well as regular Duncan Hunter in Shetland for BBC One. Other television credits include Vera, Grantchester, Case Histories, The Paradise, Doctor Who, Psychoville, Taggart, Phoneshop and Paradox. In 2005, he portrayed regular Bruno Jenkins in the BBC One series Casualty. In 2018, he portrayed Dr Neil Sommer in the Channel 4 series Humans. In 2025, Bonnar starred in Netflix drama Dept. Q as Lord Advocate Stephen Burns. In September 2025, he joined the cast of BBC detective series Ludwig, playing newspaper editor Gareth Fisher in the upcoming second series.

His theatre performances include Bosola in The Duchess of Malfi at the Old Vic, London in 2012, Philistines at the Lyttelton, National Theatre in May 2007, Phil in Mammals in a national tour in 2006, David in A Girl in a Car with a Man at the Jerwood Theatre Upstairs in December 2004, Benedick in Much Ado About Nothing at the Salisbury Playhouse in September 2004, Cyrano de Bergerac at the National Theatre in 2004 and Parade at the Donmar Warehouse in September 2007.

Bonnar provided the voice and motion capture for Edward "Blackbeard" Thatch in the 2013 video game Assassin's Creed IV: Black Flag. He also provides the voice and motion capture for Townsend in the 2016 game Battlefield 1. He also features in the Doctor Who series Doom Coalition from Big Finish Productions, where he portrays the Eleven, a villainous Time Lord who retains the personalities of his past incarnations in his mind.

Bonnar also voices Twigs and Box in the CBeebies series Tree Fu Tom.

In May 2025, Bonnar was announced as a contestant on the first series of The Celebrity Traitors. Bonnar competed as a Faithful before eventually being banished in the sixth episode.

== Personal life ==
Bonnar was born in Edinburgh to environmental artist Stan and his wife Rosi. Stan's job as town artist for the Scottish New Towns meant the family moved around and Mark spent his childhood in Stonehouse, South Lanarkshire, attending Townhead Primary School in Stonehouse. Bonnar has presented a BBC documentary on the new towns titled Meet You at the Hippos.

By 1981 the family had moved to Edinburgh and Mark attended Leith Academy. Mark attended school with future Guilt and Dept. Q co-star Jamie Sives. He married actress Lucy Gaskell on 28 December 2007. Their first child was born in July 2011, and their second in June 2015.

== Filmography ==
Year	Title	Role	Notes
2001	Rebus	DI Jim Margolies	Episode: "Dead Souls"
2002	Wire in the Blood	Stevie McTeer	Episodes: "The Mermaids Singing: Parts 1 & 2"
2003	Loving You	DC Colin Morris	TV film
2003	Taggart	Phillip Gardner	Episode: "An Eye for an Eye"
2005	Afterlife	Ben Varcoe	Episode: "Misdirection"
2005	Casualty@Holby City	Bruno Jenkins	Episodes: "Teacher's Pet" & "Crash and Burn"
2005–2006	Casualty	Bruno Jenkins	32 episodes
2007	The Trial of Tony Blair	Tommy	TV film
2007	Nuclear Secrets	Penkovsky	Mini-series: Episode: "The Spy from Moscow"
2007	The Bill	Ray Moore	8 episodes
2007	The Inspector Lynley Mysteries	DC Ed Harvey	Episode: "Know Thine Enemy"
2007	Britz	Richard	Two-part TV drama
2009	Paradox	DS Ben Holt	Mini-series
2010	PhoneShop	Don	Episode: "Salesman of the Month"
2010	Taggart	DCI Atkins	Episode: "Ends of Justice"
2011	Doctor Who	Jimmy / Jimmy's duplicate	Episodes: "The Rebel Flesh" & "The Almost People"
2011	Psychoville	Detective Finney	6 episodes
2012	Playhouse Presents	Gerry McCluskey	Series 1: Episode: "The Minor Character"
2012	Twenty Twelve	Ben Farrell	Episode: "Clarence House"
2012	The Paradise	Peter Adler	2 episodes
2013	Silent Witness	Piers Christie	Episodes: "Trust: Parts 1 & 2"
2013	Case Histories	Andy Marshall	Series 2: Episode: "Nobody's Darling"
2013	Thirst	John Valentine	Short
2013	Assassin's Creed IV: Black Flag	Edward "Blackbeard" Thatch	Video game (Voice and motion capture)
2013–2022	Shetland	Duncan Hunter	23 episodes
2014	Line of Duty	DCC Dryden	Series 2: 6 episodes
2014	Law & Order: UK	Mark Glendon	Episode: "Hard Stop"
2014	X Moor	Fox	Film
2014	Grantchester	Dr Robinson	Episode: "Episode 3"
2014	Camera Trap	Iain	Film
2015	Midsomer Murders	William Carnavon	Episode: "A Vintage Murder"
2015	All the Ordinary Angels	Mr Taylor	Film
2015	Vera	Danny Pryor	Episode: "Muddy Waters"
2015	Home Fires	Reverend Adam Collingborne	3 episodes
2015	Sunset Song	Reverend Gibbon	Film
2015	Sword Coast Legends	Izhkin	Video game (Voice)
2015	Jekyll & Hyde	Lord Protheroe	Mini-Series: 5 episodes
2015	The Other Side of Home	Paul	Short
2015–2019	Catastrophe	Chris	20 episodes
2016	Billionaire Ransom (aka Take Down)	Lawrence Close	Film
2016	Undercover	John Halliday	Mini-series: 5 episodes
2016	New Blood	Peter Mayhew	Case 1: 3 episodes; Case 2: 2 episodes
2016	Battlefield 1	Townsend	Video game (Voice)
2016–2017	Porridge	Officer Meekie	TV film and mini-series
2017	Unforgotten	Barrister Colin Osborne	Series 2 - BAFTA Scotland winner for this role
2017	Apple Tree Yard	Gary Carmichael	Mini-series
2017	Mission Galapagos	Narrator	Full series (For International Version)
2017	Eric, Ernie and Me	Eric Morecambe	TV film
2017	Edmund the Magnificent	Nate	Short
2018	Urban Myths	Billy	Series 2: Episode: "Agatha Christie"
2018	Humans	Neil Sommer	Series 3: 7 episodes
2018	Say My Name	Dec	Film
2019	The Kid Who Would Be King	Mr Jeffreys	Film
2019	Summer of Rockets	Field	Mini-series: 6 episodes
2019	Defending the Guilty	Miles	3 episodes
2019–2023	Guilt	Max	Mini-series: 12 episodes
2020	Quiz	Paul Smith	Mini-series
2020	Zog and the Flying Doctors	The Unicorn (voice)	Short film
2020	Assassin's Creed Valhalla	Ceolwulf II of Mercia	Video game (Voice)
2021	Meet Me at the Hippos	Presenter	Documentary
2021	Operation Mincemeat	Jock Horsfall	Film
2022	Litvinenko	Clive Timmons	Main role
2022–2024	The Heroic Quest of the Valiant Prince Ivandoe	Additional voices	
2023	Calamity James	Dad	Short film
2023	Napoleon	Jean-Andoche Junot	Film
2023–2025	The Rig	Alwyn Evans	2 episodes
2023	World on Fire	Sir James Danemere	Main role
2023	Murder is Easy	Reverend Arthur Humbleby	Two-part drama
2024	Inside No. 9	Raymond	Episode: "Boo To a Goose"
2025	Lockerbie: A Search for Truth	Roderick McGill	TV series
2025	Last Breath	Craig	Film
2025	The Celebrity Traitors	Himself	Contestant; series 1
2025	Dept. Q	Stephen Burns	Main role
2026	Assassin's Creed Black Flag Resynced	Edward "Blackbeard" Thatch	Video game (Voice and motion capture)
2026	Ludwig	Gareth Fisher, a journalist at the East Anglia Advertiser	Season 2
2026	Marble Hall Murders	Elmer Waysmith	Six-part series
TBA	Rambling	Gerry	Lead role

== Audio work ==
Date	Title	Role	Director	Station
November 1997 – October 2005	Westway	Denny Hampton		BBC World Service
22 March 2006	A Tiny Light in the Darkness	Daniel	Lu Kemp	BBC Radio 4 Afternoon Play
14 August 2007	Cut to the Heart	Pete	Kirsty Williams	BBC Radio 4 Afternoon Play
6 July 2008	Piper Alpha		Toby Swift	BBC Radio 3 Drama on 3
13 January 2015	Doctor Who: The English Way of Death	Porteus	Nicholas Briggs	None, Big Finish Productions
12 October 2015 – present	Doctor Who: Doom Coalition	The Eleven	Various	None, Big Finish Productions
12 October 2015 – present	Doctor Who: Ravenous	The Eleven	Various	None, Big Finish Productions
26 January 2016	A History of Paper	Him	Kirsty Williams	BBC Radio 4 Afternoon Play
January 2019 – March 2021	For The Love of Leo	Leo Fabiani	Marilyn Imrie, Michael Chaplin, Catherine Bailey	BBC Radio 4
13 September 2019 – present	Space 1999	Commander John Koenig	Nicholas Briggs	None, Big Finish Productions
November 2021 – November 2022	UNIT: Nemesis	The Eleven	Ken Bentley	None, Big Finish Productions
November 2025	The Archers	Finlay	Various	BBC Radio 4

== Awards and nominations ==
Year	Award	Category	Work(s)	Result	Ref
2014	British Academy Scotland Awards (BAFTA Scotland)	Best Actor in Television	Line of Duty	Nominated	
2015	British Academy Scotland Awards (BAFTA Scotland)	Best Actor in Television	Catastrophe	Nominated	
2017	British Academy Scotland Awards (BAFTA Scotland)	Best Actor in Television	Unforgotten	Won	
2018	Broadcasting Press Guild (BPG) Awards	Best Actor	Unforgotten, Eric, Ernie and Me, Catastrophe	Won	
2022	British Academy Scotland Awards (BAFTA Scotland)	Best Actor in Film	Operation Mincemeat	Nominated	
2026	Prague Independent Film Festival	Best Actor	The Confession	Won	
