= Stag (TV series) =

2016 British black comedy TV series

- Genre: Black comedy
- Created by: Jim Field Smith; George Kay
- Written by: Jim Field Smith; George Kay
- Directed by: Jim Field Smith
- Starring: Jim Howick; Stephen Campbell Moore; Pilou Asbæk; JJ Feild; Rufus Jones; Amit Shah; Reece Shearsmith; Tim Key; Christiaan Van Vuuren; James Cosmo
- Country of origin: United Kingdom
- Original language: English
- No. of series: 1
- No. of episodes: 3

Production
- Executive producers: Jim Field Smith; George Kay; Myfanwy Moore
- Cinematography: Rob Kitzmann
- Editor: David Webb
- Running time: 58 minutes

Original release
- Network: BBC Two
- Release: 27 February – 12 March 2016

Stag is a British black comedy television serial created by Jim Field Smith and George Kay, starring Jim Howick, Stephen Campbell Moore, Pilou Asbæk, JJ Feild, Rufus Jones, Amit Shah, Reece Shearsmith, and Tim Key. The three-part series, directed by Jim Field Smith from his scripts co-written with George Kay, began broadcasting on BBC Two, in the United Kingdom, on 27 February 2016.

== Plot ==
Eight men set off on a hunting trip in the Scottish Highlands, a stag party for Angus "Johnners" (Stephen Campbell Moore). Ian, (Jim Howick) the bride's brother, is a last-minute addition to the party after somebody else dropped out. Being less of an alpha male than the others, he is immediately singled out for ridicule, but remains with the group because he has promised his sister that he will look after her fiancé. After insulting the creepy gamekeeper (James Cosmo) who best man "Ledge" (JJ Feild) has hired to take them hunting in the woods, the group is abandoned by the old man, leaving them to fend for themselves. After they set up camp, a mysterious figure begins killing them off one by one. The group soon find themselves running for their lives, all while speculating who the killer could be.

== Cast ==
- Jim Howick as Ian
- Stephen Campbell Moore as Johnners
- JJ Feild as Ledge
- Rufus Jones as Cosmo
- Amit Shah as Mexico
- Pilou Asbæk as Neils
- Reece Shearsmith as Wendy
- Tim Key as Aitken
- Christiaan Van Vuuren as Christoph
- James Cosmo as The Gamekeeper
- Sharon Rooney as Brodie
- Tom Davis as The Chef
- Amanda Abbington as Fran
- Ruta Gedmintas as Sophie
