= The Criminals (1962 film) =

- Ad from The Sydney Morning Herald 5 September 1962
- Written by: William Haulke; Eric Paice,
- Directed by: Henri Safran
- Starring: Ken Goodlet
- Country of origin: Australia
- Original language: English

Production
- Running time: 60 mins

Original release
- Release: 5 September 1962

The Criminals is a 1962 Australian TV movie. Australian TV drama was relatively rare at the time. It had been filmed for British TV in 1959.

== Plot ==
In London, a cracksman helps people in a firm help him with a robbery. Four men people are trapped after a robbery.

== Cast ==
- Ken Goodlet as Dorell
- Alexander Archdale as Crawford
- Richard Davies
- Lou Vernon as the nightwatchman

== Production ==
It was Henri Safran's last play before he left for a six-month overseas tour. The production was shot in Sydney.

== Reception ==
The Bulletin said it was "no Rififi but it was fairly good television drama, with a solid performance by Ken Goodlet." The Woman's Weekly called it "well produced".

== See also ==
- List of television plays broadcast on Australian Broadcasting Corporation (1960s)
