= George Kay (writer) =

English screenwriter

- Kay in 2026
- Occupations: Television writer; producer
- Known for: Lupin; Criminal; Hijack
- Website: observatorypictures.co.uk

George Kay is an English television writer and producer. He is best known as the creator of the series Lupin, Criminal, Hijack, The Long Shadow, and War. He has also worked on the shows Litvinenko, Stag, My Mad Fat Diary, The Hour, The Tunnel, and the first season of Killing Eve.

== Early life ==
Whilst a teenage student at Wellington College, Berkshire, Kay met director Jim Field Smith, with whom he later founded Idiotlamp Productions.

== Career ==
Kay began his career in non-scripted entertainment, serving as head of development at Twenty Twenty Television and head of factual at Blast! Films, where he co-created productions such as The Choir, Evacuation, and The Sorcerer's Apprentice.

Kay became a full-time writer in 2009, after he won the Brit List with his first feature script, Good Luck Anthony Belcher. He went on to write episodes of The Hour for the BBC, The Tunnel for Sky, My Mad Fat Diary for C4, and two episodes of the first season of Killing Eve.

Kay created his first comedy series, Stag, with Field Smith. They continued their collaborations with the anthology franchise Criminal for Netflix, both produced by their production company Idiotlamp, and Litvinenko, for ITV. Whilst writing the script for Litvinenko, Kay had access to transcripts of Alexander Litvinenko's 18 hours of deathbed interviews with the London Metropolitan Police. Litvinenko's widow, Marina, and the Metropolitan Police, supported the production of the series. The show has been sold to over eighty international territories.

For Netflix, Kay created the hit global series Lupin, based on the Arsène Lupin books, starring Omar Sy. The show debuted to critical acclaim, winning a Critics Choice Award for Best Foreign Language Series and being nominated for Best Drama Award at the International Emmy Awards and Golden Globe Awards.

Kay subsequently created the series The Long Shadow for ITV, detailing the five-year manhunt for the serial killer Peter Sutcliffe. It was nominated for Best Drama at the 2024 British Academy Television Awards.

=== Observatory Pictures ===
Kay founded his own label, Observatory Pictures, and inked a television deal with his co-producers New Pictures and All3Media in 2024.

The first show under Observatory was Gone (2026), starring David Morrissey and Eve Myles and co-produced by New Pictures. In November, the second series was greenlit by ITV.

In collaboration with Stockholm's B-Reel Films and New Pictures, Kay went on to create Blood Sacrifice for Netflix Sweden. The show follows a semi-estranged father-and-son detective duo who are brought back together when a mysterious killer strikes in Stockholm.

Kay's latest series is War, for HBO and Sky, starring Sienna Miller and Dominic West. It follows two rival legal firms battling it out on the UK's highest-profile divorce case in history.

Production on Kay's Apple TV series The Wanted Man, starring Hugh Laurie, took place in London in May and June 2025. It is set to premiere on 6 January 2027.

== Filmography ==
Key
†	Denotes television productions that have not yet been released

Year	Title	Writer	Creator	Executive producer	Notes
2012	The Hour	Yes	No	No	Episode "Honey Trap"
2013	The Tunnel	Yes	No	No	Episode 1.6
2014	Our Zoo	Yes	No	No	Episode 1.3
2015	My Mad Fat Diary	Yes	No	No	3 episodes
2016	Stag	Yes	Yes	Yes	Co-created and written with Jim Field Smith
2018	Killing Eve	Yes	No	No	2 episodes
2019–2020	Criminal	Yes	Yes	Yes	Co-created with Jim Field Smith
2021–present	Lupin	Yes	Yes	Yes	
2022	Litvinenko	Yes	No	Yes	
2023	The Long Shadow	Yes	Yes	Yes	
2023–present	Hijack	Yes	Yes	Yes	Co-created with Jim Field Smith
2026	Blood Sacrifice	Yes	Yes	Yes	
2026–present	Gone	Yes	Yes	Yes	
2026–present	War	Yes	Yes	Yes	
2027	The Wanted Man †	Yes	Yes	Yes	
