= Jim Field Smith =

English director, writer, and producer (born 1979)

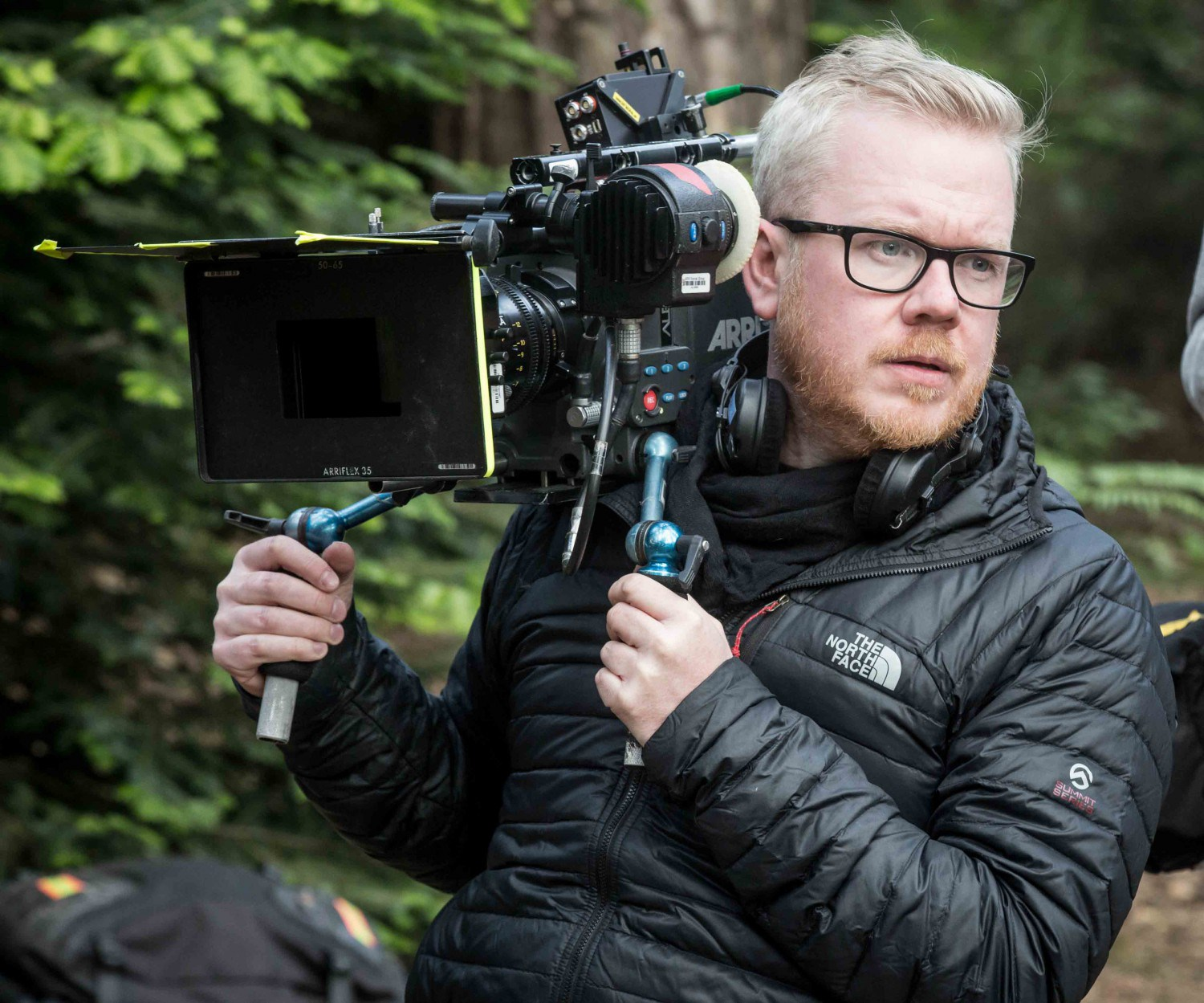
- Jim Field Smith on the set of STAG (BBC, 2016)
- Born: 20 February 1979 (age 47)
- Education: Wellington College, Berkshire; University of Birmingham
- Occupations: Director, film producer, writer, actor
- Writing career
- Period: 2003–present
- Genre: Comedy
- Notable works: Episodes; The Wrong Mans; She's Out of My League; Stag
- Website: www.jimfieldsmith.com

Jim Field Smith (born 20 February 1979) is an English film and television director, writer and producer.

== Early career ==
Smith was a member of the British sketch comedy group Dutch Elm Conservatoire, who were nominated for the prestigious Perrier Award for their show Conspiracy in August 2005. The show transferred to the West End, and toured the UK. The following year, the group returned for a third year to the Edinburgh fringe and subsequently the Belfast theatre festival with a show entitled "Prison".

He co-wrote and starred in the BBC Radio 4 comedy series Deep Trouble with Ben Willbond. As an actor, he appeared in various British TV comedies such as Coupling, Snuffbox and My Life in Film, and numerous commercials both on screen and as a voiceover artist. He also wrote several episodes of the MTV puppet sitcom Fur TV.

== Directing career ==
Smith got his break in Hollywood through directing short films such as Where Have I Been All Your Life? (2007) and Goodbye to the Normals (2006).

In Pittsburgh, Pennsylvania in 2008, he directed Jay Baruchel and Alice Eve in his first full-length feature, the DreamWorks romantic comedy She's Out of My League, released worldwide by Paramount Pictures in 2010.

Smith directed Butter, a satirical comedy written by Jason Micallef surrounding an Iowan butter sculpting championship, starring Jennifer Garner, Hugh Jackman, Olivia Wilde and Ty Burrell that was released in 2011.

He directed the second season of Episodes for BBC and Showtime, starring Matt LeBlanc, gaining BAFTA and Golden Globe nominations for "Best Comedy".

Smith is the director/producer of the 2013 BBC Two comedy-thriller show The Wrong Mans, written by James Corden, Mathew Baynton and Tom Basden. The show, a co-production between the BBC and Hulu, is about a pair of lowly office workers who become unwittingly embroiled in a deadly criminal conspiracy.

Smith is the co-founder of Idiotlamp Productions, a film and TV production company he established with old school friend and collaborator George Kay. Together, they created and produced the 2016 BBC Two comedy-thriller Stag. The series, set in the Scottish Highlands, is about a group of young men on a stag weekend and their fight to escape a mystery killer. The series was directed, co-written and produced by Smith. Together with Kay, he went on to create the Netflix Original drama series Criminal, and the thriller series Hijack for Apple TV starring Idris Elba, which Smith directed and executive produced.

Smith directed all eight episodes of Truth Seekers, (co-created by and starring Simon Pegg and Nick Frost), which premiered in October 2020.

Smith directed David Tennant as Alexander Litvinenko in the mini-series Litvinenko, which was scripted by George Kay. It is also starring Margarita Levieva as Marina Litvinenko and Mark Bonnar and Neil Maskell as Scotland Yard police officers.

Outside of scripted film and television work, Smith has directed a number of commercials, including campaigns for Cow & Gate, Heinz, Burger King, Smirnoff and MINI.
