= Pett Productions =

- Industry: Television/Web series
- Genre: Production company
- Founded: 2001
- Founder: Bob Mortimer; Vic Reeves; Lisa Clark
- Defunct: 2015
- Headquarters: Maidstone, UK
- Website: http://www.pett.tv

Pett Productions was an independent production company, established by Bob Mortimer, Vic Reeves and Lisa Clark in 2001. The company was based at the Maidstone Studios in Maidstone, Kent and has produced several television shows in comedy, reality, documentary and internet format. It was dissolved in May 2015.

== Productions ==
- The Fight (2003) A boxing match for Comic Relief, held between Ricky Gervais and Grant Bovey. The winner received £5000 for charity. (BBC Two, 1 episode)
- Star Chamber (2003) Pilot of a debate program featuring Mortimer as chairman, Rhys Thomas as his sidekick and Vic Reeves, Charlie Higson, Johnny Vegas and Liz Smith in debate (BBC Two, 1 episode).
- Celebrity Dog School (2003) Event held for Comic Relief in which celebrities Johnny Vaughan, Michelle Ryan, Ronnie Corbett, Julian Clary, Jake Humphrey, Dora Bryan and Linda Barker teamed up with a special dog trainer and pitted their dogs against each other to see whose was best trained. (BBC One, 6 episodes)
- Vic's Chicks (2003) Documentary series shown during the countdown to Easter, in which Vic Reeves introduced viewers to bizarre and extraordinary chickens from around the globe. (BBC Three (via the red-button), 10 x 3 minute episodes)
- Catterick (2004) A dark, critically acclaimed comedy drama about a man, Carl, who is trying to find his long lost son, with the aid of his brother Chris, whilst being chased by a maniac. (BBC Three / BBC Two, 6 episodes)
- Star Sale (2004) Charity show, in which a group of celebrities chose five of their possessions to auction off to the public. (BBC One, 10 episodes)
- Monkey Trousers (2004–5) Sketch comedy series, originally titled The All Star Comedy Show, co produced with Steve Coogan's Baby Cow Productions. Starring Mortimer, Reeves, Coogan and Benton and many other comedians and guests. (ITV, 8 episodes)
- Tittybangbang (2005–7) Sketch comedy series co-written by Mortimer and Jill Parker, starring Lucy Montgomery and Debbie Chazen, which aired three series. (BBC Three, 21 episodes)
- Memoirs of a Cigarette (2007) Documentary in which well known celebrity smokers talk about their first cigarette and about the smoking ban, whilst ex-smokers talk about giving up. (Channel 4, 1 episode)
- Shooting Stars (2008–11) Anniversary Special, plus three new full series. Aired in December 2008, August to September 2009, July to August and Christmas 2010 and August to September 2011. (BBC Two, 20 episodes)
- Liz Smith's Summer Cruise (2009) A documentary featuring Liz Smith, directed by Daisy Asquith. Aired in 2009. (BBC Four)
- Vic and Bob's Afternoon Delights (2011) Online Improvised Sketch Show sponsored by the British arm of Australian Lager giant, Foster's, with one sketch uploaded every afternoon for 20 days, starting on 4 July 2011. This was the first time Vic Reeves and Bob had worked together on anything (other than Shooting Stars) in 6 years. Foster's also funded a Vic and Bob live show to accompany the series, this was Vic and Bob's first live appearance in 10 years. (FostersFunny.co.uk, 20 episodes/sketches)
- House of Fools (2014–15) The series takes the duo of Vic and Bob's blend of rapid-fire jokes and surrealist wit, applying it to the sitcom format. Episodes are filled with musical routines to deliver plot points, strange events that break up the action, non-sequitur gags, off-colour jokes, and oddball characters. Each episode shows Mortimer's house being filled with uninvited people, to his frustration - usually built around a basic sitcom premise. Reeves is one of the uninvited guests who lives in the house. Also living in the house is Bob's son Erik (Daniel Simonsen). Julie (Morgana Robinson) lives next door. (BBC Two, 13 episodes)
