= Tom Davis (actor) =

British actor and comedian (born 1979)

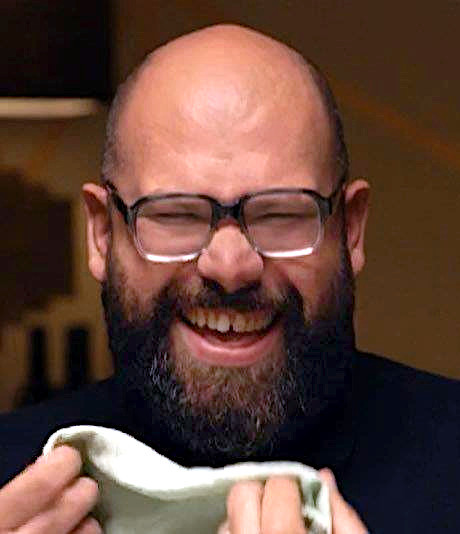
- Davis in 2019
- Born: 27 April 1979 (age 47); Croydon, London, England
- Occupation: Actor
- Years active: 2009–present
- Television: Lemon La Vida Loca; The Keith Lemon Sketch Show; Plebs; Murder in Successville; Judge Romesh; King Gary
- Spouse: Kathryn Davis
- Children: 1

Tom Davis (born 27 April 1979) is an English actor and comedian best known for his role as DI Sleet in the BBC Three comedy Murder in Successville, and as Gary King in the BBC sitcom King Gary.

== Career ==
Before television, Davis worked as a scaffolder and market stall trader. When his friend was working as a runner on Bo' Selecta, they gave some videos of their own comedy sketches to Leigh Francis, who then invited Davis to appear on the show. He appeared in various comedy roles on TV over the following years.

In 2015, he co-created and starred in Murder in Successville. This semi-improvised show, in which a celebrity guest must help DI Sleet solve a fictional crime, became a cult hit. In 2022 an American adaptation of the show, renamed Murderville, was released by Netflix. In 2016, Davis was named a BAFTA Breakthrough Brit and appeared in the films Free Fire and Prevenge. In 2017, he appeared in Paddington 2. In 2018-2021, he co-created, starred in and co-wrote the comedy series King Gary. The show portrayed life and its difficulties as a family man in the outer London suburbs. The show received reasonable reception; The Times felt viewers would "either love or hate King Gary". In 2022 he appeared in the comedy crime drama, The Curse. In 2023, he featured in Wonka.

He performs stand-up comedy professionally and co-hosts The Wolf & Owl podcast with Romesh Ranganathan.

== Personal life ==
Davis is married to Kathryn, and they have a daughter who was born in December 2021.

== Filmography ==
=== Film ===
Year	Film	Role	Director	Notes
2012	Outside Bet	Gutsy George	Sacha Bennett	
2013	All Things to All Men	Roberts	George Isaac	
2014	Top Dog	Cod	Martin Kemp	
2014	The Guvnors		Gabe Turner	
2014	Half Time and Down	Bob	Mark-John Ford	Short film
2015	After the End	Gordon	Sam Southward	Short film
2015	Legacy	Roger	Davie Fairbanks; Marc Small	
2015	Traders	Big John	Rachael Moriarty; Peter Murphy	
2015	The Bad Education Movie	Big Tom	Elliot Hegarty	
2016	Prevenge	DJ Dan	Alice Lowe	
2016	Free Fire	Leary	Ben Wheatley	
2017	Paddington 2	T-Bone	Paul King	
2018	The More You Ignore Me	Bighead Wildgoose	Keith English	
2023	Wonka	Bleacher	Paul King	
2026	Ladies First	Chris Black	Thea Sharrock	

=== Television ===
Year	Title	Role	Notes
2009	Cha'mone Mo'Fo'Selecta! A Tribute to Michael Jackson	John Landis	Uncredited; Television film
2010	The Morgana Show	Various characters	5 episodes
2011	The Comic Strip Presents...	Burly Man	9.01 "The Hunt for Tony Blair"
2011	Comedy Lab	Ian Bodkin	12.05 "The Warm-Up Guy"; Also writer
2012	Very Important People	Barman	1.01 Series 1, Episode 1
2012	Alan Partridge on Open Books with Martin Bryce	Fan	Television film
2013	Common Ground	Sunshine Simon	1.04 "Sunshine Simon" (also writer); 1.05 "Rupert"; 1.08 "William & Sinclair"
2013	Playhouse Presents	Ralph	2.06 "Stage Door Johnnies"
2013	Lemon La Vida Loca	Big Tom	6 episodes
2013	Live at the Electric	Bubba Duke	3 episodes Also writer
2013	Big School	Simon	1.04 "Episode 4"
2013	BBC Comedy Feeds	Various characters	2.05 "The Cariad Show"
2014	The Midnight Beast	Shopkeeper	2.03 "Beast Holiday Ever"
2014–2018	Plebs	Davus	15 episodes
2014	Bad Education	Dean	3.06 "The Prom"
2014	The Life of Rock with Brian Pern	Security Guard	2.02 "The Day of the Triffids"
2015	Still Open All Hours	Nikki's Boyfriend	1.03 "Episode 3"
2015	Cockroaches	Felix	6 episodes
2015–2016	The Keith Lemon Sketch Show	Various characters	12 episodes
2015	Drunk History	Henry VIII	1.01 "Episode 1"
2015	House of Fools	Butcher Brother #1	2.04 "The Danceathon Affair"
2015	Uncle	Mechanic	2.06 "Fight For The Future"
2015–2017	Murder in Successville	DI Sleet	18 episodes Also associate producer and writer
2015	Virtually Famous	Himself	2.02 Series 2, Episode 4
2015	Undercover	Tigran	1.06 "The Finale"
2015	BBC Comedy Feeds	Perry	4.01 "Dead Air"
2015	Together	Construction Worker	1.01 "Signs"
2015	Jekyll & Hyde	Billy "Beef" Wellington	1.04 "The Calyx"
2016	The Aliens	Jean	1.01 "Episode 1"
2016	Stag	Chef	Television miniseries
2016	Going Forward	Terry	3 episodes
2016	Harry Hill's Tea Time	Egg Wallace	3 episodes
2016	8 out of 10 cats	Himself	2 episodes
2017	Revolting	Hank Duke - Foie Gras Farmer	1.04 "Episode 4"
2017	Bizarre ER	Narrator (voice)	10 episodes
2017	The Great Xmas Rant	Panelist	Television film
2018	Action Team	Logan Mann / Vlad	6 episodes Also writer
2018	Judge Romesh	Court Bailiff	All episodes
2018–2021	King Gary	Gary King	All episodes
2019	The Ranganation	Himself	1.04 "Episode 4"
2019	The Virtues	Landlord	Episode 1
TBA	Sticky	Hayes	1.00 "Where Eagles Fap"
2022	The Curse	Big Mick Neville	
2023	The Great Stand Up to Cancer Bake Off	Himself	6.01
2023	A League of Their Own	Himself	Series 16, Episode 6
2025	A Thousand Blows	Charlie Mitchell	
2026	The Gentlemen	Aslan	2.04 Episode: "The Bigger Picture"
2026	The Reluctant Vampire	Victor	6 Episodes

=== Podcast ===
Year	Title	Role	Notes
2020–present	Wolf and Owl	Host	179 episodes, alongside Romesh Ranganathan

== Writing credits ==
Production	Notes	Broadcaster/Distributor
Comedy Lab	"The Warm-Up Guy" (co-written with James De Frond, 2011)	Channel 4
Common Ground	"Sunshine Simon" (co-written with Eleanor Lawrence, 2013)	Sky Atlantic
Live at the Electric	8 episodes (co-written with Stephen Grant, 2013)	BBC Three
Murder in Successville	16 episodes (2015–2017)	BBC Three
Action Team	5 episodes (2018)	ITV
