= Laura Checkley =

English actress

Laura Checkley (born 18 July 1980) is an English actress and comedian known for playing the regular character Louise throughout three series of Detectorists on BBC Four, Monica in Action Team on ITV2, Terri King in the BBC One sitcom King Gary and Mrs Blocker in BAFTA award winning Drama In My Skin. In 2025, she played the regular character of Theresa, the third ‘Eel Sister’, in Season 2 of The Change on Channel 4. She has also appeared in guest roles on other programmes including Brassic, Wanderlust, Red Dwarf, Enterprice, Porters, W1A and This Country. She played Jackie Stokes in the drama Screw on Channel Four.

In 2009, she started a comedy duo, Checkley Bush, with Victoria Bush. They had a residency at the Leicester Square Theatre. They performed the Edinburgh Festival, Latitude Festival and Manchester Comedy Festival. In 2011, they reached the final of The Funny Women Awards.

On film, she appeared as Susan, the floor manager of Hard News in Bridget Jones's Baby, and Maz in Military Wives.

== Filmography ==
=== Film ===
Year	Title	Role	Notes
2006	Girls? Eugh!	(unknown)	Short film
2016	Bridget Jones's Baby	Susan, Floor Manager	
2017	Oh Be Joyful	Security Guard	Short film
2019	Military Wives	Maz	
2024	Movember - You Can Do It Here Too	Office Grow	Short film
2024	Our Father	Gemma	Short film. Also associate producer
2024	Bilby	Teagan	
2025	Solers United	Commentator	Short film

=== Television ===
Year	Title	Role	Notes
2005	Rosemary & Thyme	Librarian	Series 3; episode 1: "The Cup of Silence"
2009	Criminal Justice	PC Hawes	Series 2; episode 1
2014	Edge of Heaven	Ann-Marie	Episodes 1–6
2014	Coronation Street	Phil	1 episode
2015	Cradle to Grave	Lil	Episodes 1, 2, 7 & 8
2014–2022	Detectorists	Louise	Series 1–3; 17 episodes
2016	Raised by Wolves	Laura	Series 2; episode 2: "Hairy Poppins"
2016	Morgana Robinson's The Agency	Policewoman	Episodes 4 & 7
2017	This Country	Shaz Gallacher	Series 1; episode 4: "King of the Nerds"
2017	W1A	Paramedic	Series 3; episode 4
2017	Red Dwarf	Areto / Hugh Jass	Series 12; episode 2: "Siliconia"
2017	Hailmakers	Pam	(unknown episodes)
2018	Action Team	Monica	Episodes 1–6
2018	Wanderlust	Paula	Episodes 2–4
2018–2021	King Gary	Terri King	Series 1 & 2; 14 episodes
2018–2021	In My Skin	Mrs. Blocker	Series 1 & 2; 7 episodes
2019	Porters	WPC Newman	Series 2; episode 3: "Halloween"
2021	Brassic	Ruth	Series 3; episode 1
2022–2023	Screw	Jackie Stokes	Series 1 & 2; 12 episodes
2024	The Completely Made-Up Adventures of Dick Turpin	Sandra	Series 1; episode 3: "Run Wilde"
2024	Mojo Swoptops	Nori (voice)	Series 1; episode 1: "Mojo Mail"
2024	The Day of the Jackal	Paddy Denham	Series 1; episodes 1 & 3
2025	Dope Girls	Sarah Fisher	Episodes 1–6
2025	The Change	Theresa	Series 2; episodes 1–6
2025	What It Feels Like for a Girl	Bev	Episodes 1–6
