= Francine Lewis =

British Impressionist

- Born: 7 November 1975 (age 50); Blackpool, England
- Occupations: Impressionist; actress; presenter
- Years active: c. 1997 – present
- Notable work: Very Important People; Britain's Got Talent
- Children: 2
- Website: Official website

Francine Lewis (born 7 November 1975) is an English impressionist, actress, model, and television presenter, best known for participating in the ITV talent show series Britain's Got Talent in 2013 finishing in tenth place overall.

== Biography ==
=== Television ===
She has been on several television shows such as Loose Women and The Generation Game.

Lewis also appeared on the Channel 4 show Very Important People, in which, alongside Morgana Robinson, she impersonated a host of celebrities.

=== Britain's Got Talent ===
Her audition saw her perform impressions of Stacey Solomon, Amy Childs, Katie Price, Holly Willoughby and Cheryl Cole and she was put through to the next round. When the judges selected whom to put through to the live shows, they said that Lewis and fellow contestants Alice Fredenham and Robbie Kennedy were "the three easiest yeses [they had] ever given". In the semi-final Lewis repeated Childs, Cole, Price and also included Dot Cotton, Sharon Watts, Sharon Osbourne, Nadine Coyle, Audrey Roberts and Deirdre Barlow. She won her semi-final, receiving 23.1% of the public vote to earn a place in the final on 8 June.

Her prior notable work caused problems when she auditioned for Britain's Got Talent, as many thought that she was already too notable to enter a talent competition. Lewis however replied stating: "I've been out of it for such a long time and it's a show, it's a variety show, there's no where [else] for people like me. I have gone and stood on stage and did what I do best, it's a competition and there's a different generation out there."

=== Other work ===
Lewis has been in numerous theatre performances, notably Aladdin, Bugsy Malone and Snow White. She had also appeared in Cinderella, Robin Hood and played the Wicked Stepmother in ‘’Snow White’’ recently.

== Personal life ==
Lewis has two children. She is Jewish.

In April 2022 Lewis revealed that she had lost £90,000 after being persuaded to invest it in a stock market scam. During the 22 April edition of the GB News lunchtime discussion programme To the Point in which she discussed her experience with the scammers, Lewis claimed to have recently discovered her husband of 17 years had been having an extramarital affair. Her comments were received positively on social media.
