= Daniel Simonsen =

Norwegian comedian and actor

Daniel Simonsen is a Norwegian comedian and actor.

== Career ==
Simonsen has performed at the Edinburgh Festival Fringe since 2009. As well as his Newcomer Award, his show Champions received positive reviews, he supported Simon Amstell on his UK tour in 2012 and 2015 and appeared on Russell Howard's Good News in 2012. In 2019, he performed on The Late Show with Stephen Colbert.

Simonsen has won and been nominated for awards both in Norway and the UK including Chortle Best Newcomer, Best Comedian at Comedy Fight Club and the So You Think You're Funny competition.

From 2014 to 2015, he has had a recurring role in Vic and Bob's BBC sitcom House of Fools as Erik.

== Filmography ==
=== Film ===
Year	Title	Role	Notes
2013	A Stable for Disabled Horses	Kanoute	Short film
2023	Trundle and the Last Borscht of Atlantis	Trundle	Short film
2024	Let's Start a Cult	Jim Smith	

=== Television ===
Year	Title	Role	Notes
2014–2015	House of Fools	Erik	13 episodes
2015	Rotters	Eyes	Television film
2019	Uninspired	Olson	Episode: "The Blizzard"
2019	Timewasters	Alexei	3 episodes
2020	Going Both Ways	Underwear Man	Episode: "Packing the House"
