= Nitin Kundra =

Nitin Kundra is an English actor from Newcastle upon Tyne. He has performed on television and stage. Kundra has appeared in a number of television shows in the United Kingdom. He was a series regular on ITV drama Steel River Blues playing firefighter Asif Hussain. He also performs as recurring character Indian Keith on the BAFTA-winning ITV2 panel show Celebrity Juice.

Nitin has made several guest appearances on shows including Emmerdale, Casualty, Party Animals, Doctors, Coronation Street and Silent Witness

In 2013, it was confirmed by ITV that Kundra will play series regular Tandeep Chatterjee in new six-part comedy-drama Edge of Heaven.

On stage Nitin has appeared in four plays at the National Theatre. His debut at the National saw him play Mahesh Aslam in Simon Stephen's 2008 play Harper Regan. His performance drew special attention from the Telegraph's Charles Spencer referring to it as 'A comic cameo of exceptional grace and humour'.

His most recent appearances at the National Theatre were in 2011 where he performed as Bradwell in D.C Moore's 'The Swan' and Dean in Tom Basden's 'There is a War'. His performance in The Swan earned him a notice in The New York Times who commented that Kundra 'made an especially endearing lost soul'.

In 2013 Nitin performed in Told By and Idiot's production of 'Too Clever By Half' at the Royal Exchange, Manchester directed by Paul Hunter.
