= House of Fools (TV series) =

- Also known as: Vic & Bob's House of Fools
- Genre: Comedy
- Written by: Bob Mortimer; Vic Reeves
- Directed by: Nick Wood
- Starring: Bob Mortimer; Vic Reeves; Matt Berry; Daniel Simonsen; Morgana Robinson; Dan Skinner; Ellie White (series 2)
- Country of origin: United Kingdom
- Original language: English
- No. of series: 2
- No. of episodes: 13

Production
- Executive producer: Mark Freeland
- Producer: Lisa Clark
- Production locations: BBC Television Centre (Pilot); Elstree Studios (Series 1); Dock10 (Series 2)
- Running time: 30 minutes
- Production companies: Pett Productions; BBC Comedy

Original release
- Network: BBC Two; BBC Two HD
- Release: 14 January 2014 – 30 March 2015

House of Fools is a British comedy television series that was first broadcast on BBC Two on 14 January 2014. Bob Mortimer and Vic Reeves wrote the show, and star in it as themselves.

House of Fools was recommissioned for a second series in March 2014. A Christmas Special aired on 28 December 2014, with the second series following on 16 February 2015.

On 25 August 2015, BBC Two cancelled the series.

== Plot ==
The series takes the duo of Vic and Bob's blend of rapid-fire jokes and surrealist wit, applying it to the sitcom format. Episodes are filled with musical routines to deliver plot points, strange events that break up the action, non-sequitur gags, off-colour jokes, and oddball characters. Each episode shows Bob Mortimer's house being filled with uninvited people, to his frustration - usually built around a basic sitcom premise. Vic Reeves is one of the uninvited guests who lives in the house. Also living in the house is Bob's son Erik (Daniel Simonsen). Julie (Morgana Robinson) lives next door.

== Cast ==
House of Fools cast

- Bob Mortimer as Himself

Bob owns the house where most of the action takes place. A proud wig-wearer, Bob has a crush on Sandi Toksvig as a running gag. Though he is often led to frustration by the antics of his friends, Bob and his friends always manage to pull through tough situations with teamwork, which they celebrate in the closing credits musical routine of the show.

- Vic Reeves as Himself

Bob's best friend and housemate, acting as both a source of annoyance and a voice of reason to Bob. Vic tends to be more easy-going than Bob, with more of a sense of awareness about the bigger picture. Vic is willing to go out of his way to help his friend Bob out, though he will often indulge in strange and juvenile behaviour, such as stealing wigs using a trained hawk from a wig-wearer's convention. He often starts the episode with a song, usually to the tune of "Day Trip to Bangor".

- Daniel Simonsen as Erik

Bob's son, Erik is a recluse who rarely comes down from his heavily guarded bedroom. When he does, it's usually to dry-retch at something that disgusts him, or mock his father for being uncool. By contrast, he considers Bob's friend and flatmate Vic Reeves to be a cool guy, and maintains an amiable relationship with him. In spite of constantly putting Bob down, Erik appears to secretly harbour genuine devotion and love for his father, as seen in the episode The Birthday Affair.

- Morgana Robinson as Julie

Vic and Bob's crazy next-door neighbour, Julie is something of a nymphomaniac, constantly encouraging the male characters to 'buff my Barnaby Rudge'. She is particularly fixated on Vic Reeves, who spurns her romantic advances nervously. Julie often appears aloof of problematic situations, even smiling broadly when people are distressed, and often plays gags on others. In spite of her odd behaviour, she is often willing to go out of her way to help her neighbours when they are in trouble.

- Matt Berry as Beef Galore

Vic and Bob's suave, eccentric retro/70s styled next door neighbour with a fetish for African ladies and countless anecdotes about his rather nefarious activities in Africa. His first entrances in episodes are usually accompanied by a singing routine in disco dance music. He often shows up to help out or entertain his friends.

- Dan Skinner as Bosh Rogan Josh

Vic's jailbird brother, Bosh takes an instant dislike to Bob despite living in his house and paying no rent. Bosh is unable or unwilling to find either a job or a place to stay, and frequently invents excuses for him to extend his visit when confronted. As a running gag, he often calls people a twat, even when being friendly. He often proves himself useful when the other characters are in need.

- Reece Shearsmith as Martin

Julie's deceased former lover, Martin is referenced several times by Julie before making an appearance in The Ghost Affair.

- Ellie White as Rachel (series 2)

Rachel is Erik's girlfriend and has several noticeable similarities to Erik, including her clothes, speaking voice and mannerisms.

== Production ==
House of Fools was commissioned by Janice Hadlow and Shane Allen, both working for the BBC. The pilot episode was filmed on 22 March 2013 at BBC Television Centre. The remaining five episodes of Series 1 were filmed at Elstree Studios on 8, 15, 22, 29 November and 6 December 2013 in front of an audience of 260 people. Series 2 was filmed at dock10, MediaCityUK.

The series is a BBC Comedy production in association with Pett Productions. House of Fools has Lisa Clark as producer and Mark Freeland as executive producer. The theme music is called "Party Time", written by Keith Mansfield and published by KPM.

== Episodes ==
=== Series 1 (2014) ===
No. overall	No. in season	Title	Directed by	Written by	Original release date	UK viewers (millions)
1	1	"The Conan Affair"	Nick Wood	Bob Mortimer & Vic Reeves	14 January 2014	1.270
Bob has a hot date planned but needs to get rid of all his unwanted house guests first.
2	2	"The Pork Pie Affair"	Nick Wood	Bob Mortimer & Vic Reeves	21 January 2014	0.936
Julie entrusts Vic and Bob with the safety of her prize pork pie.
3	3	"The Probation Affair"	Nick Wood	Bob Mortimer & Vic Reeves	28 January 2014	0.815
Vic and Bob help Bosh show his probation officer that he is a decent member of society.
4	4	"The Wig Affair"	Nick Wood	Bob Mortimer & Vic Reeves	4 February 2014	0.665
Bob hopes to defend his title of toupee wearer of the year but his toupee is stolen.
5	5	"The Birthday Affair"	Nick Wood	Bob Mortimer & Vic Reeves	11 February 2014	0.677
Bob is not at all pleased when Vic invites Bob's ex-wife over as a birthday surprise.
6	6	"The Ghost Affair"	Nick Wood	Bob Mortimer & Vic Reeves	18 February 2014	0.758
To win a prize chimp, Vic must provide a genuine photo of a ghost.

=== Christmas Special (2014) ===
No.	Title	Directed by	Written by	Original release date
7	"The Bobble Hat Affair"	Nick Wood	Bob Mortimer & Vic Reeves	28 December 2014
It's Christmas Eve and Vic and Beef can't wait to start the celebrations, but this isn't the case for poor Bob whose festivities are cut short when the Christmas present he organised for his sulky son Erik, a bobble hat, is destroyed.

=== Series 2 (2015) ===
No. overall	No. in season	Title	Directed by	Written by	Original release date
8	1	"The Erik Affair"	Nick Wood	Bob Mortimer & Vic Reeves	16 February 2015
Vic and Bob feel Erik has come of age and decide to arrange a surprise blind date for him at Julie's Bistro with someone Beef found on the internet.
9	2	"The Botox Affair"	Nick Wood	Bob Mortimer & Vic Reeves	23 February 2015
After stealing some unused botox equipment from a very famous residence, Vic decides to test it out on Julie and Bosh, with striking results. Johnny Vegas guest stars.
10	3	"The Moth Affair"	Nick Wood	Bob Mortimer & Vic Reeves	9 March 2015
Julie asks Vic to create a promotional video for her new bistro, but he writes his script on the back of a moth - which escapes into the kitchen and begins gorging on everyone's underwear. Steph McGovern guest stars as a BBC reporter reporting on the arrival of Norwegian teen popstar Mags Flahonnoman at the bistro.
11	4	"The Danceathon Affair"	Nick Wood	Bob Mortimer & Vic Reeves	16 March 2015
After finding out that the three notorious Butcher brothers will also be competing in a danceathon at Julie's bistro, Vic and Beef try by any means to get out of the event and avoid potential humiliation.
12	5	"The Lost Plot Affair"	Nick Wood	Bob Mortimer & Vic Reeves	23 March 2015
Vic and Bob are struggling to find a plot for this episode, but things look up when letter arrives from the White House announcing a surprise visit to their household.
13	6	"The Whip Affair"	Nick Wood	Bob Mortimer & Vic Reeves	30 March 2015
Vic prepares for a big date with his ex-girlfriend Mary, but she has to cancel at the last minute so his friends set about concocting an ingenious plan to make sure he isn't left disappointed.

== Home media ==
Both series of House of Fools have been released on DVD.
