= Camille Coduri =

English actress

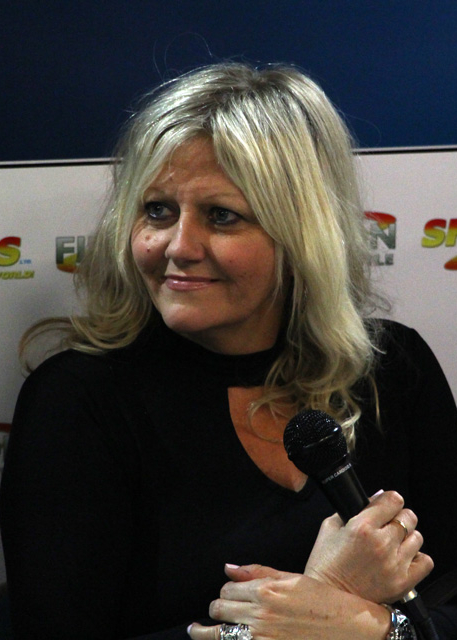
- Coduri in 2016
- Born: 18 April 1965 (age 61); Wandsworth, London, England
- Occupation: Actress
- Years active: 1987–present
- Spouse: Christopher Fulford (m. 1992)
- Children: 2

Camille Coduri (born 18 April 1965) is an English actress. She gained prominence through her role as Jackie Tyler, the mother of Rose Tyler, in Doctor Who (2005–2006, 2008, 2010). She has since appeared in the BBC comedies Him & Her (2010–2013) and King Gary (2018–2021), and the Channel 4 sitcom Big Boys (2022–2025).

Her films include Nuns on the Run (1990), King Ralph (1991), and The Firm (2009).

== Early life ==
Coduri was born in south London. She studied drama at Kingsway Princeton College. She pursued higher education for only four months to resit her O Levels, and left to go into theatre.

== Career ==
Coduri featured in the film comedies Hawks (1988), Nuns on the Run (1990) and King Ralph (1991). She has also appeared extensively on British television, appearing in guest roles in episodes of series such as Rumpole of the Bailey, A Bit of Fry & Laurie, Boon, A Touch of Frost and in the BBC's 1997 adaptation of Henry Fielding's novel The History of Tom Jones, a Foundling. She appeared in BBC Three's six-part drama series Sinchronicity (2006).

Coduri recurred regularly in the first two series of the revived Doctor Who as Jackie Tyler and reprised her role in the Series 4 episode "Journey's End" (2008) and David Tennant's final episode, "The End of Time" (2010). She also participated in a Doctor Who-themed episode of The Weakest Link, first broadcast on 30 March 2007. She won the game, beating Noel Clarke (Mickey Smith) in the final round, splitting the prize money of £16,550 evenly between multiple sclerosis and children who are carers.

In an episode of Ashes to Ashes (April 2010), Coduri played a woman who helps DCI Gene Hunt and DI Alex Drake during an investigation. In September 2010, she joined BBC Three comedy Him & Her, playing Shelly.

On 15 May 2017, it was announced that Coduri would reprise her role as Jackie Tyler in the Doctor Who Big Finish Productions audio Infamy of the Zaross, which was released on 23 November 2017. She also reprised her role as Jackie Tyler in the Big Finish audios Wednesdays For Beginners (part of The Lives of Captain Jack, 2017), Retail Therapy (part of The Ninth Doctor Chronicles, 2017), The Siege of Big Ben and Flight into Hull (part of Short Trips, 2018).

She is the narrator of the Ninth Doctor audiobooks The Monsters Inside (2011), The Stealers of Dreams (2011), Winner Takes All (2011) and Rose (2018) (novellisation), as well as the Tenth Doctor novelisation The Christmas Invasion (2018), produced by BBC Audio.

== Personal life ==
Coduri married actor Christopher Fulford in 1992. They have two children, including actress Rosa Coduri-Fulford.

== Filmography ==
=== Film ===
Year	Title	Role	Director	Notes
1987	A Prayer for the Dying	Jenny Fox	Mike Hodges	
1988	Hawks	Maureen	Robert Ellis Miller	
1989	Strapless	Mrs. Clark	David Hare	
1990	Nuns on the Run	Faith Thomas	Jonathan Lynn	
1991	King Ralph	Miranda Greene	David S. Ward	
2002	Mrs Caldicot's Cabbage War	Jackie Jones	Ian Sharp	
2005	The Business	Nora	Nick Love	
2008	Love Me Still	Maggie Ronson	Danny Hiller	
2008	Adulthood	Woman on Bus	Noel Clarke	
2009	The Firm	Shel	Nick Love	
2009	Jenny.	Miss Mac	Jonson D'Angelo	Short film
2010	4.3.2.1.	Mrs. Phillips	Noel Clarke, Mark Dacis	
2010	The Other Side of My Sleep	Samantha	Raffaello Degruttola	Short film
2014	Film: The Movie	Cat Summers	Raffaello Degruttola	
2015	Scottish Mussel	Aunt Nettie	Talulah Riley	
2017	Tremor Cordis	Kelly	Raffaello Degruttola	Short film
2017	The Entertainer	Patty	Jonathan Schey	Short film
2021	Leave to Remain	(unknown)	Remy Bazerque	Short film

=== Television ===
Year	Title	Role	Notes
1987	Life Without George	Dolores	Episode: #1.4
1987	Boon	Shandy Tremblett	Episode: "Taken for a Ride"
1988	Campaign	Carol Braithwaite	Mini-series; 6 episodes
1988	The River	Cousin Sheila	Episode: #1.4
1989	Morris Minor's Marvellous Motors	Sonia Head	6 episodes
1989	Made in Spain	Rosy	Television film
1989	The Ruth Rendell Mysteries	Lesley Arbel	Episode: "The Veiled One"
1990	A Bit of Fry & Laurie	Laura	Episode: #2.5
1991	Boon	Naomi	Episode: "Stamp Duty"
1992	Rumpole of the Bailey	Dot Clapton	Series 7; 5 episodes
1994–1995	Nelson's Column	Lorraine Wilde	Series 1 & 2; 9 episodes
1995	Moving Story	Muriel	Episode: "Bear Necessities"
1996	A Touch of Frost	Pauline Venables	Episode: "Paying the Price"
1996	The Famous Five	Maggie	Episode: "Five on a Hike Together"
1997	The History of Tom Jones, a Foundling	Jenny Jones	Mini-series; 3 episodes
2002	Trial & Retribution	Sharon Fearnley	Episode: "Trial & Retribution VI – Part Two"
2003	Family	Sophie	Mini-series; 6 episodes
2004	William and Mary	Carol	Episode: #2.2
2004	England Expects	Sadie Knight	Television film
2005	The Commander	Cathy Cripps	Episodes: "Blackdog: Parts One & Two"
2005–2010	Doctor Who	Jackie Tyler	15 episodes
2006	Pickles: The Dog Who Won the World Cup	Janice Yeomans	Television film
2006	Sinchronicity	Peggy Simmons	5 episodes
2006	Sacrifice	Tash	Short television film
2007	The Last Detective	Beverley Vincent	Episode: "Once Upon a Time on the Westway"
2007	The Weakest Link	Herself - Contestant	Doctor Who Special
2007	Agatha Christie's Marple	Mrs. Lindsay	Episode: "Ordeal by Innocence"
2008	Lark Rise to Candleford	Patty	Episode: #1.3
2008	Honest	Chrissie	3 episodes
2008	New Tricks	Carrie Soper	Episode: "Spare Parts"
2010	Ashes to Ashes	Gloria	Episode: #3.5
2010	Midsomer Murders	Grace Bishops	Episode: "The Noble Art"
2010–2013	Him & Her	Shelly	Series 1–4; 17 episodes
2012	Secrets and Words	Rita	Episode: "Mightier than the Sword"
2014	Edge of Heaven	Judy	All 6 episodes
2015	Cradle to Grave	Barbara	Mini-series; episode 6
2018–2021	King Gary	Denise King	Series 1 & 2; 14 episodes
2019	This Time with Alan Partridge	Make-Up Artist	Cameo; 2 episodes
2022	Death in Paradise	Sandra White	Episode: #11.5
2022	The Curse	The Narrator	All 6 episodes
2022–2025	Big Boys	Peggy	Series 1–3; 16 episodes
2023	Rain Dogs	Donna	Mini-series; episode: "Emotional Erection"
2024	Sweetpea	Carol on Tuesdays	3 episodes
2026	Death Valley	Dawn Apsted	Episode: #2.3
2026	War	Melinda 'Mumsy’ Monroe	Episode: No More Nasty Surprises
TBA	White Diary	Claire	Television film. Completed
