= Action Team =

- Genre: Action; Comedy
- Created by: Tom Davis; James De Frond; Nico Tatarowicz
- Directed by: James De Frond
- Starring: Tom Davis; Vicky McClure; Jim Howick; Laura Checkley; Kayode Ewumi; Derek Riddell; Charlie Rawes
- Composer: Waen Shepherd
- Country of origin: United Kingdom
- Original language: English
- No. of seasons: 1
- No. of episodes: 6

Production
- Executive producers: Andy Brereton; Cassias Hesturk
- Producers: Vessela Bannzurkova; Jon Jennings
- Cinematography: Roy Estabrook
- Editor: Calum Ross
- Running time: 30 minutes
- Production company: Shiny Button Productions

Original release
- Network: ITV2
- Release: 5 March – 2 April 2018

Action Team is a British television action comedy spoof made by Shiny Buttons Productions for ITV2. The programme follows the activities of Action Team, a team of British secret agents.

== Cast and characters ==
- Tom Davis as Logan Mann:Team leader of Action Team / Vladimir Schevchenko:Interpol's Most Wanted Bad Ass No.5 (who wants to be No.1)
- Vicky McClure as Ruth: Head of MI6, and Logan's boss
- Jim Howick as Graham: Tech wizard on the team that likes Anne
- Laura Checkley as Monica: Logan’s Handler
- Kayode Ewumi as Huxley
- Derek Riddell as Anne
- Charlie Rawes as Sergei
- Wolfgang Cerny as Bogohardt

== Episodes ==
| No. | Title | Directed by | Written by | Original release date | UK viewers (millions) |
|---|---|---|---|---|---|
| 1 | "Abacus" | Unknown | Unknown | 5 March 2018 | N/A |
Action Team have to foil an attack on a conference.
| 2 | "The Antelopes Tail" | Unknown | Unknown | 5 March 2018 | N/A |
A device is stolen and in the hands of evil doers. The team have to get it back at all costs.
| 3 | "Mind Games" | Unknown | Unknown | 12 March 2018 | N/A |
Logan goes to his girlfriends parents and an attempt is made on his life.
| 4 | "Taken" | Unknown | Unknown | 19 March 2018 | N/A |
Logans girlfriend is kidnapped in revenge for the team regaining control of the device.
| 5 | "Super Mega Robot" | Unknown | Unknown | 26 March 2018 | N/A |
The team is disbanded after Logan's disappearance. Vlad reveals his ultimate weapon.
| 6 | "Push the Button" | Unknown | Unknown | 2 April 2018 | N/A |
Vlad learns his new position on the "Badass charts", and the team work unsanctioned ops to save the world.
