= Morgana Robinson's The Agency =

- Genre: Comedy
- Written by: Jack Bayles
- Directed by: Tom McKay
- Starring: Morgana Robinson
- Country of origin: United Kingdom
- Original language: English
- No. of series: 1
- No. of episodes: 7

Production
- Executive producer: Neil Webster
- Producer: Jack Bayles
- Editor: Mark Henson
- Running time: 30 minutes
- Production company: Happy Tramp

Original release
- Network: BBC Two
- Release: 26 September – 7 November 2016

Morgana Robinson's The Agency is a British mockumentary about fictional talent agency Mann Management, with impressions by Morgana Robinson. In a seven-part show, Robinson plays the roster of talent agent Vincent Mann. It was broadcast on BBC Two from September 2016.

The premise of the programme is that Vincent has allowed a documentary crew access to his celebrity clients, including Miranda Hart, Natalie Cassidy, Russell Brand, Joanna Lumley, Gregg Wallace, Mel and Sue, Danny Dyer and Adele, all of whom are played by Robinson. Critical reception was largely positive.

The show's additional cast members include Cavan Clerkin, Oliver Maltman, Terry Mynott, Matthew Steer, Cariad Lloyd and Matt Berry.

== Reception ==
Robinson has received praise for her impersonations. Lucy Mangan of The Guardian says the programme "is just what we need in this strife-strewn year." In comparing it to Rory Bremner's political satire which he describes as "sharp", Mat Baylis of the Daily Express describes the show as "sharp, too, but in a less appealing way."The Telegraph rated it three stars out of five.
