= The Morgana Show =

- Created by: Morgana Robinson; James de Frond
- Starring: Morgana Robinson; Tom Davis (actor); Terry Mynott; Neil Maskell
- Country of origin: United Kingdom
- No. of seasons: 1
- No. of episodes: 5

Production
- Executive producer: John Noel
- Running time: 30 minutes

Original release
- Network: Channel 4
- Release: 30 November – 28 December 2010

Related
- Very Important People

The Morgana Show is a British television sketch comedy written by Morgana Robinson and James de Frond. Robinson starred in almost all of the show's sketches, which feature a wide range of original character creations and celebrity impressions. The Morgana Show aired on Channel 4.

== History ==
Robinson had previously appeared in several comedy shows, including The Green Green Grass and My Family. She also appeared on Channel 4 show The TNT Show in "Gilbert's Special Reports", as an awkward teenage boy who interviews celebrities, along with a blind soundman and a dwarf camerawoman. The character of Gilbert would later appear in Robinson's own show.

The show was commissioned by Channel 4's head of comedy, Shane Allen, who stated "Discovering, supporting and nurturing new talent is at the heart of Channel 4 Comedy's remit, and in Morgana we really feel we’ve found a fresh performer with a huge amount of potential."

The show, which ran for one season of five episodes, was initially broadcast from 30 November to 28 December 2010.

== Selected characters ==
=== Original characters ===
Gilbert - a young boy who is often seen making his own television show, "The Gilbert Shows", filmed by his grandad. The character first appeared on The TNT Show (see above).

Madolynn - an alcoholic, "past-her-prime" Hollywood star, often seen drinking heavily and making a fool of herself at formal public places, embarrassing her husband, Norman.

The news reporters - two reporters who are often seen bickering at each other, making vile remarks about each other - yet they immediately appear to be friends when they begin their live coverage of an event. Before going live, they say "Like each other! Like each other!"

Banker - an arrogant man who is often seen talking loudly on his phone, much to everyone else's annoyance, before receiving his comeuppance at the end of the sketch.

The Hicks - a stereotypical redneck family, all of whom possess bizarre phonic tics, triggered by one another.

Joyce and Barry - a married couple who run a funeral parlour. They are seen in a documentary about their business. Joyce is often interrupted by Barry and is seemingly exasperated with him.

Mimsy - an elderly woman who lives alone in her stately manor. She continues to find everyday objects but names them extraordinary things.

The Chelsea Pensioners - two war veterans talk about their experiences in the war, one forgetting something and being corrected (or not) by the other.

Monique - daughter of alcoholic Madolynn, who is represented as a parody of a character from the MTV series The Hills.

=== Celebrity impressions ===
Cheryl Cole and Dannii Minogue - both are seen in a makeup room, presumably on the set of The X Factor, and are constantly trying to outdo each other. Cole is often seen winking and simpering to the camera.

Fearne Cotton - performs ludicrous stunts, while hyperactive, slapping herself in the face and discussing how annoying she is. Her stunts always go horribly wrong, and she is often left dismembered, impaled or otherwise badly injured, while still looking forward to the next stunt.

Lady Gaga - seen performing day-to-day tasks, such as ironing or mowing the lawn, while wearing her outlandish costumes. The sketches are always introduced to the theme of "Bad Romance".

Boris Johnson - shown as a twelve-year-old public schoolboy, bumbling his way through speeches.

== Reception ==
The show received mixed reviews. The majority, while generally praising Robinson's performance and comic timing, criticised the sketches and writing. The British Comedy Guide wrote that "Morgana Robinson is clearly an acting talent to watch, as she demonstrates a very wide range of characters in this show ... however, that all said, this is not going to be the TV vehicle that makes Morgana famous - most of the sketches just simply aren't funny enough." Paul Whitelaw, writing in The Scotsman, said: "We must part with our celebration of female-fronted comedy, thanks to The Morgana Show, a witless sketch vehicle for newcomer Morgana Robinson. Why has she got her own show? Is it because her agent is the powerful John Noel, who numbers Russell Brand among his clients? I wonder." John Crace of The Guardian wrote: "At her best, Robinson is one of the sharpest and funniest comics around: unfortunately, this show didn't do her any favours." Fiona Sturges of The Independent described the show as "teeth-grindingly, bewilderingly awful."

However, some critics gave the show a far more positive review. Jane Simon of The Daily Mirror wrote: "I know what you're thinking: Morgana who? The funny girl isn't a household name, but we expect that to change after Morgana Robinson's debut tonight ... This may be the first you've heard of Morgana - it won't be the last." Ruth Margolis of The Radio Times wrote: "Whether or not she makes you laugh, Morgana Robinson is without question a staggeringly brilliant vocal and facial mimic ... Well done to Channel 4 for not wimping out and stashing Morgana on E4."

The first episode received 780,000 viewers: average viewership over the series was under 700,000.
