= Robert Evans (screenwriter) =

Welsh scriptwriter and actor

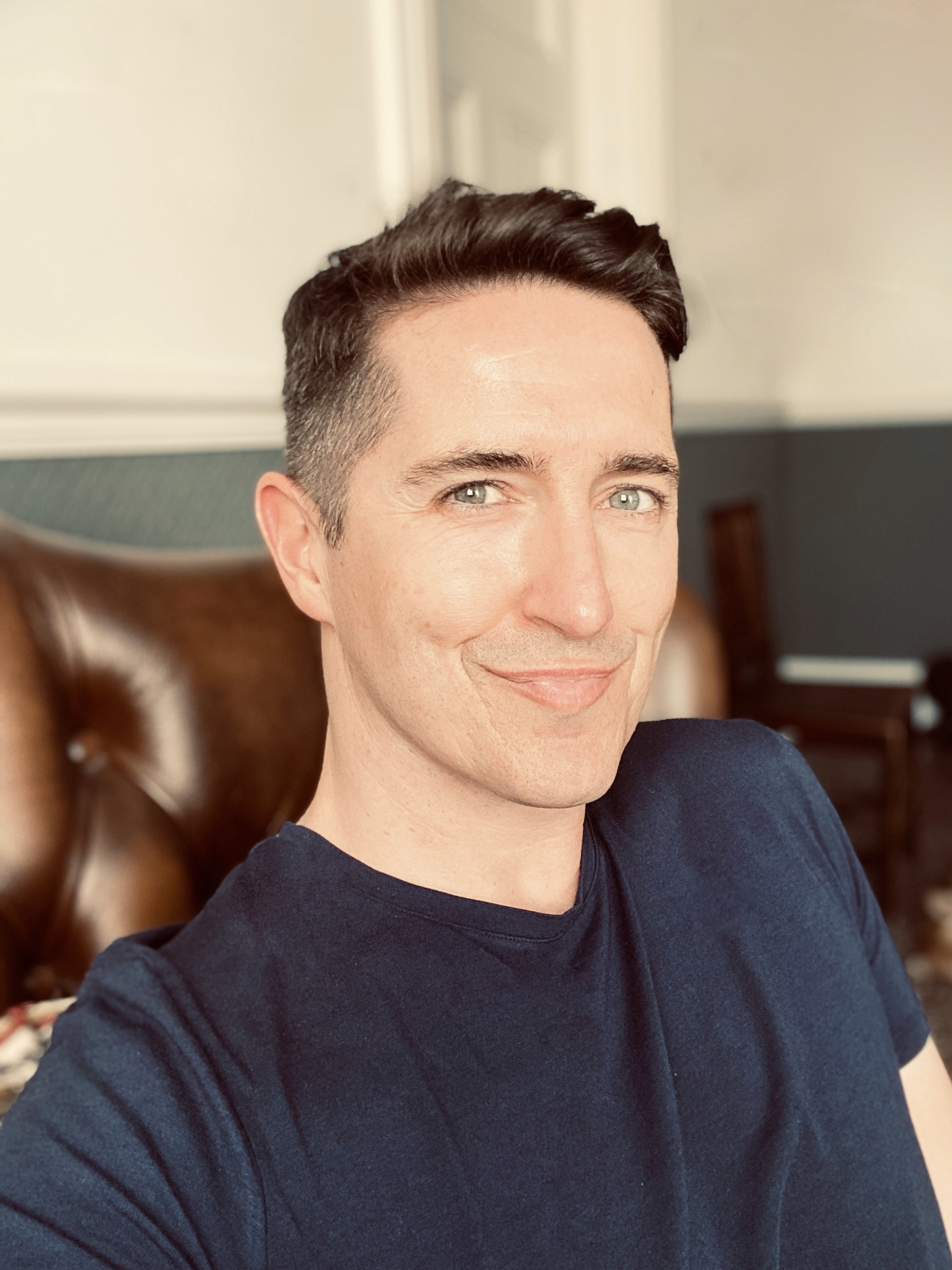
Robert Evans

Robert Neil Evans (born c. 1977) is a Welsh scriptwriter and actor.

== Career ==
In 2010, a series of thirteen 30-minute episodes of Evans's sitcom, Sadie J, was commissioned by the children's channel CBBC. Series one of Sadie J began transmitting on 14 January 2011 on the CBBC Channel. Series two started on 25 January 2012, also on CBBC. Series three was commissioned shortly afterwards and began transmitting in January 2013, for a total of 39 episodes. In September 2012, it was announced that Sadie J had been sold to the US cable channel Starz. The series began transmitting there in autumn 2013. Evans is also an actor and has made several cameo appearances in the show as Captain Skylo, star of the fictional TV sci-fi show Space Cargo.

Evans was a writer on Stella for the first four seasons and season 6.

In 2014, Evans created, wrote, and appeared in his own series of six 60-minute shows for ITV, Edge of Heaven. The show is set in a 1980s-inspired bed and breakfast in Margate.

After writing on the Disney series The Lodge in 2016, Evans and the comedy writer and actor Miranda Hart created a show for Disney Europe. It was announced on 13 February 2017 on the British Comedy Guide website that Evans and Hart had collaborated on a ten-part comedy series.

== Recognition ==
Sadie J was nominated for a children's BAFTA in the best comedy category in 2011.

Stella has multiple BAFTA award nomination and wins, and nominations for RTS and Broadcasting Press Guild Awards.

In 2019 Evans was part of the writing team for Season 2 of Secret Life of Boys, which was nominated for a Kids International Emmy Awards.
