= King Gary =

BBC comedy series

- Genre: Sitcom
- Created by: Tom Davis; James De Frond
- Written by: Tom Davis; James De Frond; Steve Stamp (one episode)
- Directed by: James De Frond
- Starring: Tom Davis; Laura Checkley; Simon Day; Camille Coduri; Romesh Ranganathan; Miranda Hennessy; Neil Maskell; Riley Burgin; Osi Okerafor
- Country of origin: United Kingdom
- Original language: English
- No. of series: 2
- No. of episodes: 13 + pilot

Production
- Executive producers: Andrew Brereton; Tom Davis; James De Fond; Alex Moody (season 1); Ben Caudell (season 2)
- Producers: Rupert Majendie (season 1); Richard Webb (season 2)
- Production company: Shiny Button Productions

Original release
- Network: BBC One
- Release: 23 December 2018 – 3 September 2021

King Gary is a British television sitcom made for the BBC co-created and written by Tom Davis and James De Frond. Davis also stars as the eponymous lead character, Gary King, while De Frond directed.

The pilot episode was shown on BBC One in the UK in December 2018. The show was commissioned for a full series which was aired in January 2020, with a Christmas special shown on 23 December 2020 on BBC One. A second series was commissioned in February 2020. The BBC have revealed there are no plans for another series.

== Plot ==
Set within a crescent in the outer London suburbs, Gary King is a family man who has taken over his dad’s building firm after he retired. He must deal with the difficulties of family life, including disputes with his neighbours, his father, and his friends. Additionally, there are often subplots involving the misadventures of his partner Terri.

== Cast ==
- Tom Davis as Gary King
- Laura Checkley as Terri King
- Simon Day as Big Gary King
- Camille Coduri as Denise King
- Romesh Ranganathan as Stuart Williams
- Miranda Hennessy as Chloe Ferdinando
- Neil Maskell as Winkle
- Riley Burgin as Teddy King
- Osi Okerafor as Darren Ferdinando

== Episodes ==
Series	Episodes	Originally released	
Series	Episodes	First released	Last released
Pilot		23 December 2018	
1	6	10 January 2020	14 February 2020
Christmas Special		23 December 2020	
2	6	30 July 2021	3 September 2021

=== Pilot (2018) ===
Title	Directed by	Written by	Original release date	U.K viewers (millions)
"Pilot"	James De Frond	Tom Davis & James De Frond	23 December 2018	N/A

=== Series 1 (2020) ===
No. overall	No. in season	Title	Directed by	Written by	Original release date	U.K viewers (millions)
1	1	"Episode 1"	James De Frond	Tom Davis & James De Frond	10 January 2020	N/A
2	2	"Episode 2"	James De Frond	Tom Davis & James De Frond	17 January 2020	N/A
3	3	"Episode 3"	James De Frond	Tom Davis & James De Frond	24 January 2020	N/A
4	4	"Episode 4"	James De Frond	Tom Davis & James De Frond	31 January 2020	N/A
5	5	"Episode 5"	James De Frond	Tom Davis & James De Frond	7 February 2020	N/A
6	6	"Episode 6"	James De Frond	Tom Davis & James De Frond	14 February 2020	N/A

=== Christmas Special (2020) ===
No. overall	No. in season	Title	Directed by	Written by	Original release date	U.K viewers (millions)
7	–	"Christmas Special 2020"	James De Frond	Tom Davis & James De Frond	23 December 2020	N/A

=== Series 2 (2021) ===
No. overall	No. in season	Title	Directed by	Written by	Original release date	U.K viewers (millions)
8	1	"Episode 1"	James De Frond	Tom Davis & James De Frond	30 July 2021	N/A
9	2	"Episode 2"	James De Frond	Tom Davis & James De Frond	6 August 2021	N/A
10	3	"Episode 3"	James De Frond	Tom Davis & James De Frond	13 August 2021	N/A
11	4	"Episode 4"	James De Frond	Steve Stamp	20 August 2021	N/A
12	5	"Episode 5"	James De Frond	Tom Davis & James De Frond	27 August 2021	N/A
13	6	"Episode 6"	James De Frond	Tom Davis & James De Frond	3 September 2021	N/A

== Production ==
Davis and De Frond had known each other from school and previously worked together on Murder in Successville. They tried to ensure all cast members were personally familiar with the suburban area on the outer London boroughs where the series is set, with Butterchurn Crescent’s location being Oak Lodge Avenue in Chigwell.

== Reception ==
Shane Allen, director of BBC Comedy said “With King Gary we also get a big daft southern comedy voice in Tom Davis at the centre of a very exciting cast.” The Daily Telegraph praised how “Davis and James De Frond have written about the working class world they know...Everything from the decor to the language feels right. They throw in a few good lines, too” but overall felt it compares less well with previous BBC sitcoms such as Gavin and Stacey that covered some of the same cultural ground. The Independent praised “a decent supply of zingers” in the script. The Times suspected the viewer would “either love or hate King Gary. It offers unsubtle Essex geezerish humour and barbecue was pronounced “BBQ” to an irritating degree. But I am quite unsubtle and have a puerile sense of humour and it made me smile, especially when I saw that Romesh Ranganathan was in it... Yes, it’s a bit crude and one-note and could wear thin after 30 minutes, but it was cheerful nonsense and we need more of that.”
