= Monkey Trousers =

- Genre: Comedy
- Written by: Vic Reeves; Bob Mortimer; Christian Azzola; Simon Blackwell; Richard Preddy; Jill Parker
- Starring: Vic Reeves; Bob Mortimer; Steve Coogan; John Thomson; Mark Benton; Tim Healy; Alistair McGowan; Ronni Ancona; Patsy Palmer; Alex Lowe; Rebecca Front
- No. of series: 1
- No. of episodes: 5 (broadcast); 1 (unbroadcast)

Original release
- Network: ITV
- Release: 20 May – 17 June 2005

Monkey Trousers is a television comedy series on ITV first broadcast in 2005, featuring Vic Reeves, Bob Mortimer, Alistair McGowan, Steve Coogan, John Thomson, Ronni Ancona, Mackenzie Crook, Griff Rhys Jones, Alex Lowe, Neil Morrissey, Patsy Palmer, Rebecca Front, Marc Wootton, Matt Berry and Mark Benton. It was directed by David Kerr and produced by Reeves and Mortimer's production company, Pett Productions. It succeeded The All Star Comedy Show, which was written by and starring Reeves and Mortimer, and produced by Coogan, who also starred.

Sketches of the show included a character who liked to run around shouting the show's title "Monkey Trousers" (Reeves), the moronic, yet fearless 'Croc Botherer' and Alistair the hopeless estate agent, who replies to every question with "I don't know" (both played by Mortimer), the swearing chef (Thomson), the 'Geordie Astronauts' (played by Reeves, Mortimer and Benton), a shouting policeman (Morrissey), a 1950s footballer (McGowan), and Roy the eerie, lonely toy-shopkeeper (Coogan).

A DVD of the series was released on 4 July 2005, which includes the unaired episode.
