= Military Wives (film) =

2019 British film by Peter Cattaneo

- Theatrical release poster
- Directed by: Peter Cattaneo
- Written by: Rachel Tunnard; Rosanne Flynn
- Produced by: Ben Pugh; Piers Tempest; Rory Aitken
- Starring: Kristin Scott Thomas; Sharon Horgan; Jason Flemyng; Greg Wise
- Cinematography: Hubert Taczanowski
- Edited by: Anne Sopel; Lesley Walker
- Music by: Lorne Balfe
- Production companies: Ingenious Media; Embankment Films; 42; Tempo Productions
- Distributed by: Lionsgate
- Release dates: 6 September 2019 (TIFF); 6 March 2020 (United Kingdom)
- Running time: 112 minutes
- Country: United Kingdom
- Language: English
- Box office: $4.8 million

Military Wives is a 2019 British comedy-drama film directed by Peter Cattaneo and written by Rosanne Flynn and Rachel Tunnard. It stars Kristin Scott Thomas, Sharon Horgan and Jason Flemyng. The film is inspired by the true story of the Military Wives Choirs, a network of 75 choirs in British military bases across the United Kingdom and overseas, featured in the fourth season of the British documentary television series The Choir.

The film had its world premiere at the 2019 Toronto International Film Festival, and was released in the United Kingdom on 6 March 2020 by Lionsgate.

== Synopsis ==
With their partners away serving in Afghanistan, a group of women on the home front form a choir and quickly find themselves at the centre of a media sensation and global movement.

== Cast ==
- Kristin Scott Thomas as Kate
- Sharon Horgan as Lisa
- Jason Flemyng as Crooks
- Greg Wise as Richard
- Emma Lowndes as Annie
- Gaby French as Jess
- Lara Rossi as Ruby
- Amy James-Kelly as Sarah
- India Ria Amarteifio as Frankie
- Laura Checkley as Maz
- Sophie Dix as Beatrice
- Beverley Longhurst as Hilary
- Jack James Ryan as Private Shaw
- Karen Sampford as Choir Member
- Robbie Gee as Red

== Production ==
In September 2018, it was announced Kristin Scott Thomas and Sharon Horgan had joined the cast of the film, with Peter Cattaneo directing, from a screenplay by Rosanne Flynn and Rachel Tunnard, with Lionsgate distributing in the United Kingdom.

== Release ==
The film had its world premiere at the Toronto International Film Festival on 6 September 2019. Shortly after, Bleecker Street acquired US distribution rights to the film. It was released in the United Kingdom on 6 March 2020 and was scheduled to be released in the United States on 27 March. However, due to the COVID-19 pandemic, it was rescheduled to 22 May 2020, where the film will be released on video on demand instead of a planned theatrical release.

== Reception ==
On the aggregator site Rotten Tomatoes, the film holds an approval rating of 77%, based on 122 reviews, with an average rating of 6.3/10. The site's critics consensus reads: "Like a favourite song you know by heart, Military Wives offers few surprises – but its pleasures are no less formidable by their familiarity." On Metacritic, the film has a weighted average score of 55 out of 100, based on 22 critics, indicating "mixed or average reviews".

The Guardian called it a "crowd-pleasing comedy-drama" that "hits all the right notes". Richard Lawson of Vanity Fair praised the performances of Scott Thomas and Horgan, writing "Scott Thomas sells the film, and the sorrow at its heart, way better than everything else around her", but noted the film feels "hurried and thin".

== Adaptation ==
It was announced on 24 February 2025 that Military Wives would be adapted for the stage as a jukebox musical. The show will play a limited season at The York Theatre Royal with previews beginning 10 September 2025 before an official opening on the 16 of the same month followed by closure on 27 September. The show is being produced by The York Theatre Royal in associated with The Everyman Theatre, Cheltenham and The Buxton Opera House. The creator of the Nativity! franchise, Debbie Isitt has written the script and will direct and the show will feature musical arrangements by her Nativity! The Musical collaborator George Dyer.
