= Justine Cain =

British actress

- Born: Justine Michelle Cain; 17 November 1987 (age 38); Coventry, England
- Occupation: Actress
- Years active: 2005–present
- Known for: Some Girls (2012–2014)
- Spouse: Jack Andrews (m. 2021)

Justine Michelle Andrews (née Cain; born 17 November 1987) is an English actress, best known for her roles of Charlie in the BBC sitcom Some Girls between 2012 and 2014 and Carly in the ITV sitcom Edge of Heaven in 2014.

== Career ==
Cain began her acting career in 2005, appearing in an episode of Doctors as Louisa Stevens. She then went on to play the recurring role of Katie Rex in The Inbetweeners between 2008 and 2009. In 2012, she was cast as Charlie in the BBC Three series Some Girls, the leader of the "Pretties" clique. In 2014, she starred as Carly in the ITV comedy Edge of Heaven. Cain has gone on to appear in further episodes of Doctors in 2015 and 2018 respectively. In 2023, she played Hilary in the ITV series Three Little Birds. In 2025, she appeared in Murder Before Evensong as Tanya the Travel Agent.

== Filmography ==
Television
Year	Title	Role
2005	Doctors	Louisa Stevens
2008–2009	The Inbetweeners	Katie Rex
2009	Pete versus Life	Katya
2010	The Bill	Janine Walker
2012–2014	Some Girls	Charlie
2013	WPC 56	Cathy Sinclair
2014	Edge of Heaven	Carly
2015	Father Brown	Laura Hope
2015	Doctors	Michelle Heath
2016	The Job Lot	Donna
2017	Emmerdale	Nurse Sasha
2019	Plebs	Melissa
2018	Doctors	Shona O'Laughlin
2023	Three Little Birds	Hilary
2025	Murder Before Evensong	Tanya the Travel Agent
