= Edge of Heaven =

- Opening title of Edge of Heaven showing the main cast (l. to r.): Scarborough, Warren, Evans, Lytton, Cain, Harrison, Coduri, Kundra, and Checkley
- Created by: Paul McKenzie; Robert Evans
- Written by: Robert Evans
- Starring: Camille Coduri; Nitin Kundra; Blake Harrison; Laura Checkley; Justine Michelle Cain; Marcia Warren; Adrian Scarborough; Robert Evans; Louisa Lytton
- Country of origin: United Kingdom
- Original language: English
- No. of series: 1
- No. of episodes: 6

Production
- Running time: 44–46 minutes
- Production company: Hartswood Films

Original release
- Network: ITV
- Release: 21 February – 28 March 2014

Edge of Heaven is a British sitcom is about a 1980s-themed guest house in Margate. The show is produced by Hartswood Films for ITV and began airing on 21 February 2014 for six episodes. In March and April it was repeated on Thursday nights.

On 5 May 2014 it was confirmed that, due to disappointing ratings, ITV would not be commissioning a second series of the sitcom. Talking to local media, executive producer Beryl Vertue said: "We had a very tough programming slot and were up against popular shows such as Sport’s Relief on the BBC. We had such a great time making the show and the sad thing is everyone at ITV loved it but unfortunately the ratings meant we couldn’t continue for a second series."

== Plot ==
The show is centred on Edge of Heaven, a 1980s-themed bed and breakfast in Margate. Alfie is jilted at the altar by his fiancée Carly. His family and friends try to help Alfie deal with the aftermath and emotions.

== Cast and characters ==
These are main and recurring cast and characters in Edge of Heaven.

- Blake Harrison as Alfie – a groom jilted at the altar by Carly.
- Camille Coduri as Judy – co-owner of the Edge of Heaven B&B, wife of Tandeep, mother of Alfie and Ann-Marie.
- Marcia Warren as Nanny Mo – a pensioner, mother of Judy and Bald Gary.
- Adrian Scarborough as Bald Gary – son of Nanny Mo, brother of Judy, husband of Camp Gary.
- Justine Michelle Cain as Carly – the bride who leaves Alfie at the altar.
- Louisa Lytton as Michelle – Carly's best friend, Alfie's unrequited love.
- Robert Evans as Camp Gary – husband of Bald Gary.
- Nitin Kundra as Tandeep – co-owner and chef at the Edge of Heaven B&B, husband of Judy, stepfather of Alfie and Ann-Marie.
- Laura Checkley as Ann-Marie – a demobbed soldier now working at her family's B&B, sister of Alfie, daughter of Judy.
- Nav Sidhu as Donkey – one of Alfie's best friends.
- Raphael Sowole as Spanner – one of Alfie's best friends.
- Rufus Jones as Prop Maartie – Alfie's boss at Sofa World.
- Michael Smiley as Snowy – Alfie's ne'er-do-well, oft-absent biological father.

== Filming locations ==
The series was set in Margate in Kent, with the beach, high street and seafront featuring throughout the series, and the BNB exterior was actually filmed on Albert Terrace. Broadstairs was also used for some filming locations, such as Morelli's Ice Cream Parlour, while some other scenes were filmed in Egham, Surrey.

== Episodes ==
| No. | Title | Directed by | Written by | Original release date |
|---|---|---|---|---|
| 1 | "Episode One" | John Henderson | Robert Evans | 21 February 2014 |
It's Alfie's wedding day and he is in for a shocking surprise at the altar as his fiancee Carly has had second thoughts after having a randy encounter on her hen night. Single for the first time since he was sixteen, Alfie's life is about to change forever, unless he can win back Carly.
| 2 | "Episode Two" | John Henderson | Robert Evans | 28 February 2014 |
After ditching Alfie at the wedding, Carly is back from her husband-free honeymoon with a brand new beau in tow. Determined to show his ex-fiancée he has moved on too, Alfie hooks up with his incredibly hot former schoolmate Julie Carter. But there is more to Julie than meets the eye?
| 3 | "Episode Three" | John Henderson | Robert Evans | 7 March 2014 |
Keen to keep their kiss under wraps for fear of hurting Carly, Alfie and Michelle go their separate ways. But Carly has more important things on her mind - she has started online dating and she is having a blast. So what is stopping Alfie and Michelle from taking the plunge too?
| 4 | "Episode Four" | Sandy Johnson | Robert Evans | 14 March 2014 |
Having walked out on Michelle just a week ago, Alfie is now anxious to patch things up with her - until he begins to wonder if Carly might want him back. Confused and worried about the future, he turns to his dad Snowy - who has just turned up out of the blue - for some much needed paternal advice on relationships.
| 5 | "Episode Five" | Sandy Johnson | Robert Evans | 21 March 2014 |
Still reeling at the news that Carly is now dating his egotistical South African boss Maartie, Alfie decides to take him on in the Margate fun run. Anxious to patch things up with Michelle, Alfie asks her to help him train for the race - but Michelle thinks he might have other motives.
| 6 | "Episode Six" | Sandy Johnson | Robert Evans | 28 March 2014 |
After his moment of madness with Carly, can Alfie hope to come clean to Michelle without wrecking their relationship for good? His mates Donkey and Spanner urge him to keep quiet but Alfie is convinced he has to tell the truth and hope she forgives him. Judy has to decide whether to tell the truth too - about her age. With a milestone birthday coming up, can she put the years of fibbing aside and tell Tandeep how old she really is? Ann-Marie discovers that there is a job for her back in Afghanistan, but she wonders if she can turn her back on her family and friends and return to the frontline. Camp Gary has got himself a new job. It is not quite as scary as being in a war zone - but it comes pretty close.

== Reception ==
With 2.7 million viewers, Edge of Heaven gave ITV its smallest ever audience for a first episode of a new scripted series airing at 9pm.

Sam Wollaston of The Guardian described Edge of Heaven as "limp" and "super lameness" despite excellent recent work by stars Blake Harrison and Camille Coduri. However, "Margate...looks lovely." Further commentary from The Guardian stated, "A bit like Margate itself, perhaps, this feels unlikely to improve anytime soon" (John Robinson) and the "comedy pootles on amusingly, but plays it far too safe to ever broach real hilarity" (Rachel Aroesti).

Ed Power of The Telegraph cited outdated, retro humour. He said that "the story felt thinner than onion skin". Despite the "smoking wreckage, it nonetheless kept you glued". "Between the winks, nudges and groans an unexpected sweetness bubbled to the surface", Power stated. The show's "heart was in the right place." He praises the "likable...ragamuffin characters".
