= Very Important People (2012 TV series) =

2012 British sketch show

- Written by: Matt Morgan
- Directed by: James de Frond
- Starring: Morgana Robinson; Terry Mynott; Francine Lewis; Liam Hourican
- Country of origin: United Kingdom
- Original language: English
- No. of seasons: 1
- No. of episodes: 6

Production
- Executive producer: John Noel
- Running time: 23 minutes
- Production company: Running Bare Pictures

Original release
- Network: Channel 4
- Release: 27 April – 1 June 2012

Related
- The Morgana Show

Very Important People is a British television sketch show starring Morgana Robinson, Terry Mynott, Francine Lewis and Liam Hourican. The series comprises six episodes and was broadcast on Channel 4 in 2012. Robinson and Mynott perform impressions of celebrities throughout the show.

== Characters ==
Characters in the show included: Adele, Jennifer Aniston, David Attenborough, Christine Bleakley, Frankie Boyle, Russell Brand, Charlie Brooker, Alan Carr, Natalie Cassidy, Amy Childs, Cheryl Cole, Fearne Cotton, Simon Cowell, Brian Cox, Sophie Dahl, Danny Dyer, Noel Fielding, Liam Gallagher, Noel Gallagher, Nick Grimshaw, Bear Grylls, Perez Hilton, Jessie J, Christian Jessen, Tom Jones, Kerry Katona, Martine McCutcheon, David Mitchell, Barack Obama, Katy Perry, Katie Price, Kate Middleton, Gordon Ramsay, Jonathan Ross, Mickey Rourke, Charlie Sheen, Stacey Solomon, Vince Vaughan, David Walliams, Kimberley Walsh, Owen Wilson and Terry Wogan.

== Series ==
The first series premiered for 6 half-hour episodes every Friday from 27 April to 1 June 2012 at 9.30-10pm. A second series had been ordered and started production in the third week of October. However, it was announced on 12 December 2012 that Very Important People would not be returning for a new series and was subsequently axed.

=== Series 1 (2012) ===
Series 1 began on Friday 27 April 2012, and consisted of six episodes.

No.	Title	Original release date
1	Series 1, Episode 1	27 April 2012
David Attenborough examines the fascinating behaviour of Frankie Boyle in Stand Up Planet. Doctor Christian has an unusual suggestion for a man with an embarrassing problem. Danny Dyer deals with one of the toughest things on earth - the commute to work. Adele struggle to make herself understood in the pub. Fearne Cotton gives some youngsters invaluable tips on Fame Skillz, while Jennifer Aniston and Owen Wilson have a disagreement about a candle in the toilet. Plus Amy Childs presents some sensational exclusives in Very Important News.
2	Series 1, Episode 2	4 May 2012
In the second episode, sketches include: Russell Brand in Stand Up Planet, Natalie Cassidy in Natalie Cassidy Is Doing This Now, Nick Grimshaw in Bloody Idiot, Brian Cox and Bear Grylls in Suburban Survivor, Gordon Ramsay, Charlie Sheen and Cheryl Cole are guests on The Obama Show. Plus appearances from Terry Wagwan and Sophie Dahl.
3	Series 1, Episode 3	11 May 2012
Sketches include Danny Dyer in Britain's Hardest Cakes, Jonathan Ross, Russell Brand and David Walliams in Midlife Cwisis. Bear Grylls shows us what it takes to survive deep in suburbia and disturbing news comes Stateside with The Perez Hilton Experiment.
4	Series 1, Episode 4	18 May 2012
5	Series 1, Episode 5	25 May 2012
6	Series 1, Episode 6	1 June 2012
The Midlife Cwisis rescue Kate Middleton from a gang in bird costumes.

=== Series 2 ===
Work on a second series started in October 2012. The series was planned to feature real celebrity guests and more worldwide celebrities, rather than mainly British celebrities. On 12 December 2012, it was announced that Very Important People would in fact not be returning and that Robinson had stopped working on impressions.
