= Nancy Sorrell =

English model and presenter

- Born: 13 July 1974 (age 52); Essex, England
- Occupations: Model; actress; television personality
- Spouse: Jim Moir (also performs as Vic Reeves) (m. 2003)
- Children: 2
- Modelling information
- Hair colour: Blonde
- Eye colour: Blue

Nancy Sorrell (born 13 July 1974) is an English model, actress and television presenter from Chigwell.

== Early career ==
Sorrell who began her career as a model, has modelled for high street brands including M&S, Next and Ann Summers and was the face of Pampers.

== Television career ==
Sorrell appeared as Greta in the movie Love Actually. She appeared as a celebrity guest alongside her husband, comedian Jim Moir (Vic Reeves) on Living TV's Most Haunted in 2003, investigating Belgrave Hall with the crew. She was a contestant in the 2004 series of I'm a Celebrity... Get Me Out of Here!, and was later joined in the jungle by her husband. Sorrell was the first to be voted out of the jungle. In June of that year, she performed live with rock guitarist Jeff Beck at the Royal Albert Hall, for a rendition of the song, "Cry Me a River". She also collaborated with Beck the previous year for his solo album, Jeff, providing vocals on several tracks.

She has also presented Trust Me – I'm a Holiday Rep on Channel 5 with Toby Anstis, has appeared on a special celebrity edition of Channel 4's Come Dine with Me with Caprice, Nicky Clarke and Jimmy Osmond and was a guest on the BBC's Hole in the Wall and Celebrity Antiques Road Trip with her husband.

In 2023, Moir and Sorrell debuted their Sky Arts birdwatching show Painting Birds With Jim And Nancy Moir.

== Personal life ==
Sorrell married Jim Moir (comedian Vic Reeves) in January 2003, and the couple have twin girls, born in May 2006. She is also the stepmother to his two children from a previous marriage. As of 2007 the family live in Charing, near Ashford, Kent.
