= The Death of Celebrity =

The Death of Celebrity is a British television programme which aired on Channel 4 in 2005. It was hosted by former tabloid editor Piers Morgan. The programme explored why the public is enamored with celebrities such as reality television show contestants, as opposed to people with genuine talent.

== Poll ==
As part of the programme, The Death of Celebrity conducted a poll to identify Britain's most pointless celebrity (celebrities who are famous despite having no obvious talent).

Here are the results:

1. Victoria Beckham
2. David Beckham
3. Katie Price
4. Abi Titmuss
5. Tony Blair
6. Jade Goody
7. The Royal Family
8. Jodie Marsh
9. Anyone from Big Brother
10. Rebecca Loos

== Reception ==
A review in the Financial Times quipped that "Any programme with a title like that has to be worth a peek", but concluded that "Unfortunately, his cri de coeur, while merciless in exposing the gulf between genuine artists and modern media celebrities, failed utterly to explain why the public has bought into the phenomenon."
