= Morgana Robinson =

British comedian, writer and actress

- Born: Shepparton, Victoria, Australia
- Relatives: Brody Dalle (half-sister)

Comedy career
- Years active: 2007–present

Morgana Robinson is a British-Australian comedian, impressionist, writer and actress. She has appeared in her comedy sketch programme The Morgana Show, Morgana Robinson's The Agency, House of Fools and Very Important People.

== Early life ==
Robinson was born in Shepparton, Victoria, to parents working as a nurse and a paramedic. Her family moved to the United Kingdom when she was three. She was primarily raised by her mother and spent much of her childhood sofa surfing. She attended Benenden School in Kent. Her father was adopted, and her schooling at Benenden was paid for by her father's biological parents after he reconnected with them during her childhood. She studied sculpture at City and Guilds in London, earning a 2:2.

On her father's side, Robinson has four elder half-siblings, one of whom is Brody Dalle (born Bree Joanna Alice Robinson) of the punk rock band the Distillers and alternative rock band Spinnerette. They first met as adults, backstage at one of Dalle's 2004 concerts at the Brixton Academy.

== Television career ==
Robinson got her start in television at age 25, after showing a homemade showreel to comedy agent John Noel while working as a waitress.

Robinson's television debut came in 2007, as she played an eastern European internet bride in BBC One's comedy The Green Green Grass. She then starred in the TV pilot Eight Steps to Enlightenment and a Nervous Breakdown, an improvised mockumentary, playing Rachel, a self-obsessed glamour model, trying to rid herself of cellulite. In 2009, she appeared as Anna in the BBC One comedy My Family in the episode "It's Training Men".

In 2009, she appeared in a running sketch segment, Gilbert's Special Report, in The TNT Show as Gilbert, a teenage boy who interviews celebrities, alongside his disabled crew members.

In 2010, Channel 4 commissioned a five-part comedy sketch show, The Morgana Show. Channel 4's head of comedy, Shane Allen, said: "Discovering, supporting and nurturing new talent is at the heart of Channel 4 comedy’s remit, and in Morgana we really feel we’ve found a fresh performer with a huge amount of potential." Her characters included giant-glasses wearing Gilbert, making TV shows from his bedroom, and her impressions of Fearne Cotton and mockumentary of Natalie Cassidy "Sonia off Eastenders".

In 2012, Robinson starred in the Channel 4 sketch show Very Important People also starring Terry Mynott. In the show, she impersonates a variety of performers, including Frankie Boyle, Danny Dyer, Amy Childs and Adele.

In 2014 to 2015, she appeared as sexy nymphomaniac cafe-owner Julie in Vic Reeves and Bob Mortimer's two-series surreal BBC Two television comedy sitcom House of Fools in which her appearances include an obsessive attraction to Vic Reeves.

In 2016, she appeared as Pippa Middleton in The Windsors, a comedy parody of the British royal family in which she uses her sexiness to try to ensnare her sister's brother-in-law Prince Harry.

In 2018, she appeared with Richard Ayoade in Travel Man, visiting Milan.

In 2021, Robinson played Hilary Bowden in series 2, episode 4 of Intelligence. The same year, she participated in the 12th series of Channel 4 comedy game show Taskmaster, which she won. She returned to the series in 2024 as part of the third "Champion of Champions" special episode.

In March 2022, Robinson appeared as Maxine in Gold comedy Newark, Newark. Also in 2022, she co-starred with Dylan Moran in the BBC Two sitcom Stuck.

== Awards ==
At the 2012 British Comedy Awards, she won in the Best Comedy Breakthrough Artist category.

In 2018, she won the BAFTA Award in the Best Short Form Programme category for Morgana Robinson's Summer.

== Filmography ==
=== Film ===
Year	Title	Role	Notes
2008	Eight Steps to Enlightenment and a Nervous Breakdown	Rachel	Short film
2012	The Actress	Princess Alopecia	Short film
2015	Set the Thames on Fire	London Town Tannoy	
2020	The Witches	Mrs. Jenkins	
2021	A Bird Flew In	Lucy	
2023	The Martini Shot	Dr. Ehm	
2024	Robin and the Hoods	Cathy	
2024	Up the Catalogue	Jamima Hoare	
2026	Ali G: Who Iz I?	Julie	
TBA	Pushing Daisy	Daisy	Short film; post-production

=== Television ===
Year	Title	Role	Notes
2007	The Green Green Grass	Katia	Series 3, episode 7: "Lust in Translation"
2009	My Family	Anna	Series 9, episode 7: "It's Training Men"
2009	The TNT Show	Gilbert	Appeared in a running sketch segment "Gilbert's Special Report". The character was later used in Robinson's own sketch show
2010	Comedy Lab	Unknown	Series 11, episode 7: "MovieMash"
2010	The Morgana Show	Various	Star, writer and creator, 5 episodes
2011	The Hunt for Tony Blair	Carole Caplin	A one-off episode of The Comic Strip Presents...
2012	Very Important People	Various	Star, writer and creator, 6 episodes
2012	Them from That Thing	Various	Two-part sketch show with Kayvan Novak, Sally Phillips and Blake Harrison produced for Channel 4's Comedy Fortnight
2013	Toast of London	Jemima Gina	Sitcom with Matt Berry. Series 1, episode 1: "Addictive Personality"
2014	Warren United	Charlotte 'Charlie' Kingsley	Voice role. Series 1, 6 episodes
2014	Chanel M	Various	BBC iPlayer content part of the Original Comedy Shorts series
2014	Big School	Fenella Forbes	Series 2, episode 1
2014	Drifters	Rebecca	Series 2, episode 6: "Meg's New Job"
2014	Psychobitches	Anna Nicole Smith / Venus / Bo Peep / Mary Magdalene / Daphne du Maurier	Series 2, 4 episodes
2014	Toast of London	Lorna Wynde	Series 2, episode 6: "Fool in Love"
2014–2015	House of Fools	Julie	BBC Two comedy series written by Bob Mortimer and Vic Reeves. Two series, 13 episodes
2015	Charlie Brooker's Weekly Wipe	Zeb / Russell Brand	Series 3, 4 episodes
2015	SunTrap	Janice / Susan	Series 1, episode 3: "The Big Sleep"
2015	Toast of London	Emma	Series 3, episode 2: "Beauty Calls"
2015	Distinquished Ladies	Minky	Television film
2015	Crackanory	Herself - Storyteller	Series 3, episode 5, Story 1: "The Truth About Suz"
2015–2016	Walliams & Friend	Various / Carla	Series 1, 5 episodes
2016	Drunk History: UK	Mary Godwin	Series 2, episode 4: "Richard III / Mary Shelley's Frankenstein"
2016	Morgana Robinson's The Agency	Various	BBC Two mockumentary series, 7 episodes
2016–2017	Hey Duggee	Buggee / Katerina the Flamingo / Peggee / Nurse	Voice roles. Series 2, 7 episodes
2016–2020, 2023	The Windsors	Pippa Middleton	Main role, 19 episodes
2017	Inside No. 9	Carrie	Series 3, episode 6: "Private View"
2018	Shakespeare & Hathaway: Private Investigators	Sally Balthasar	Series 1, episode 6: "Exit, Pursued by a Bear"
2018	8 Out of 10 Cats Does Countdown	Natalie Cassidy - Dictionary Corner Guest	Series 16, episode 1
2019	8 Out of 10 Cats Does Countdown	Natalie Cassidy - Dictionary Corner Guest	Series 18, episode 2
2019	Island of Dreams	Adele	Television film
2020	Reasons to Be Cheerful with Matt Lucas	Natalie Cassidy	Series 1, episode 3
2020	Comedians: Home Alone	Cheryl	Series 1, episode 3
2020	Truth Seekers	Janey Feathers	Series 1, episode 3: "The Girl with All the Ghosts"
2020–2021	Intelligence	Hilary Bowden	Series 1, episode 4 and Series 2, episode 4
2021, 2024	Taskmaster	Herself - Contestant	Series 12 winner, Champion of Champions 3 special
2021	How We Forgot to Save the Planet	Various	Mockumentary, part of Channel 4's programming highlighting environmental concerns in the build-up to the COP26 conference on climate change
2022	Toast of Tinseltown	Wildcat Lil	Series 1, episode 5: "Death Valley"
2022	Newark, Newark	Maxine	Lead role, Gold original comedy. Series 1, 3 episodes
2022	8 Out of 10 Cats Does Countdown	Annabel - Dictionary Corner Guest	Series 23, episode 4
2022	Stuck	Carla	Lead role, BBC original comedy. Series 1, 5 episodes
2022	The Larkins	Pinkie Jerebohm	Recurring role. Series 2, 6 episodes
2023	The Serial Killer's Wife	Jules	Episodes 1–4
2023–2024	Everyone Else Burns	Melissa	Series 1 & 2; 11 episodes
2025	Stuffed	Hannah Farooqi	Television film
2026	Paigie Justice	Sofia Reyers (singing voice)	Season 1, episode 1
