= Terry Mynott =

English comedian

- Born: 21 November 1974 (age 51); Hitchin, England

Comedy career
- Years active: 1997–present
- Medium: Actor; impressionist; comedian; singer

Twitch information
- Channel: terrymynott
- Followers: 2,900
- Last updated: 6 October 2022

Terry Mynott (born 21 November 1974) is an English comedian, actor, impressionist and singer. He stars as Martin Hurdle in Channel 4’s The Mimic, having previously appeared in The Morgana Show and Very Important People. In 2022, he portrayed the role of DS Matt Cassidy in the BBC soap opera Doctors.

== Career ==
Having left school at 16, Mynott had a variety of jobs; he performed in a band called Kawala, which earned a record deal and appeared as a support act for Faithless. He then moved onto stand-up, before getting his television break on the Channel 4 sketch comedy series The Morgana Show. He appeared in Very Important People. He has also provided pre-production impressions of David Attenborough and Jean-Claude Van Damme and many other actors prior to the original artists doing their own voiceovers. Most recently he took the lead role in the 2013 Channel 4 series The Mimic. In October 2014 he appeared in a comedy sketch for The Feeling Nuts Comedy Night on Channel 4 to raise awareness of testicular cancer.

In September 2015, Mynott appeared in BBC Three comedy Top Coppers as Nolan. He has also appeared in Channel 4's Toast of London and BBC2 sitcom Motherland, as well as providing one of the voiceovers for Bob the Builder. In October 2022, he began portraying the role of DS Matt Cassidy in the BBC soap opera Doctors, a role he portrayed until December of that year.

In 2024, Mynott released "Moonkarta", a surreal fantasy podcast series designed for both children and adults. The Podcast was created together with comedian Col Howarth. Mynott performs every character voice and creates all the sound effects himself. The show, which follows the adventures of a character named Splott, received critical praise from The Guardian, which compared its unique style to The Mighty Boosh.
