= Benjamin Sadler =

German actor

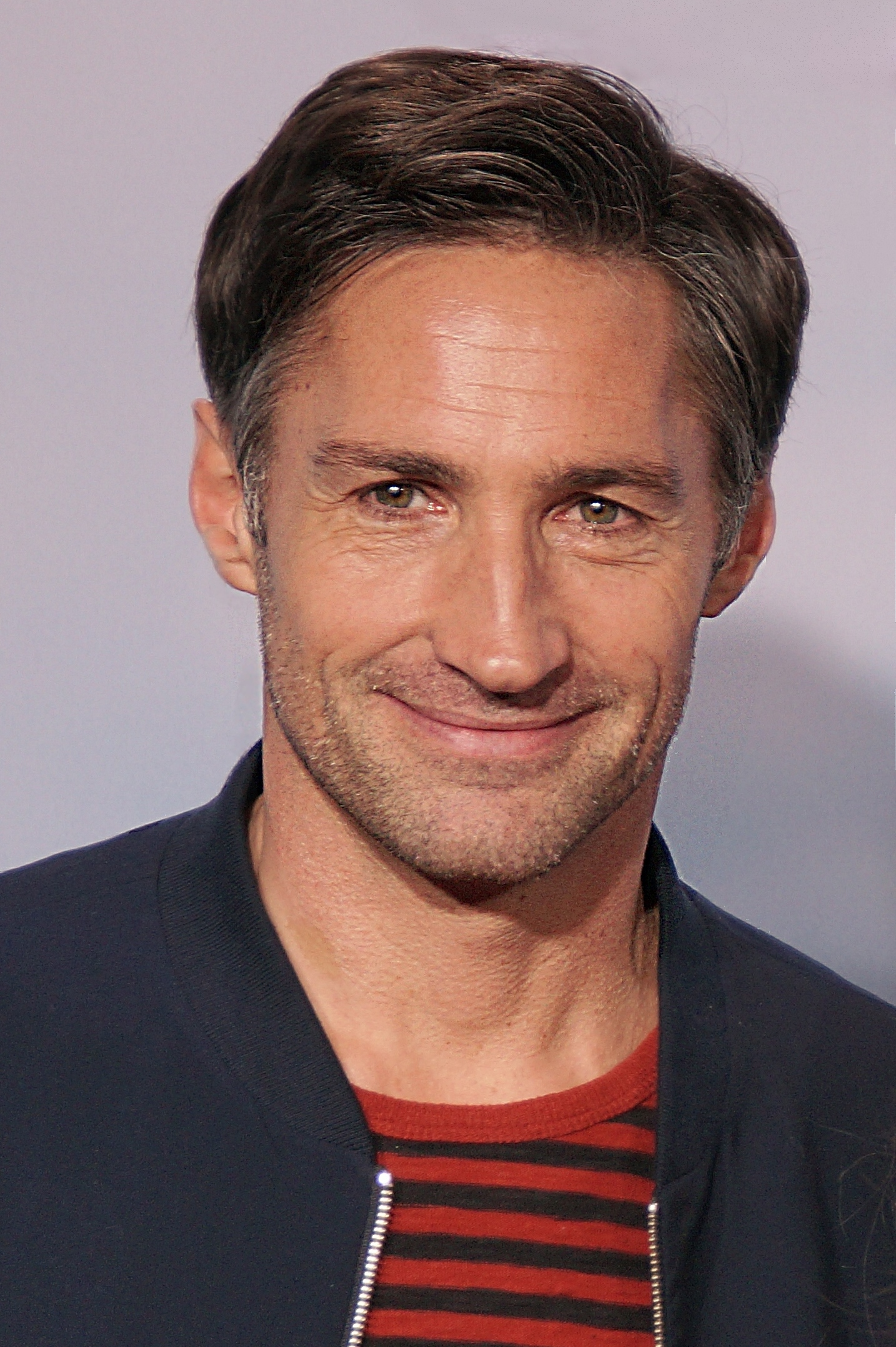
- Sadler in 2017
- Born: Benjamin Klimaschewski; 12 February 1971 (age 55); Toronto, Ontario, Canada
- Occupation: Actor
- Years active: 1994–present

Benjamin Sadler (born Benjamin Klimaschewski; 12 February 1971) is a German actor.

== Biography ==
Sadler was born in Toronto, Canada, the son of a German graphic designer and a British teacher. He lived in Canada until he was five. In 1976 he moved with his parents to Germany. After studying at the Royal Academy of Dramatic Art in London, his career as actor started in 1994 with roles in German thrillers such as Wolffs Revier and SK-Babies. In 2001 he appeared in the German-Italian film Maria Magdalena in the role as John the Baptist beside Maria Grazia Cucinotta and Danny Quinn. In 2002 he worked on two further religious films: The Bible – The Apocalypse with Richard Harris and Luther with Joseph Fiennes and Sir Peter Ustinov. He also appeared as the young emperor Augustus (Peter O'Toole was the emperor in later life).

In 2006 he played the part of a physician in the film Dresden. In 2007 he starred in Contergan as a lawyer and father of a thalidomide-disabled daughter, for which he received a Bambi Award in 2007. He explained in an interview that he was proud to be a part of the film, which influenced the German parliament to pass a law giving greater financial compensation for victims of thalidomide.

== Filmography ==
- 1996-2019: Tatort – Mord in der ersten Liga (TV Series) – Jan Liebermann / Dr. Christian Mertens / Gert Mewes
- 1998: Spuk aus der Gruft ("Spook from the Grave" – adaptation of one of a trilogy of books) – Friedrich von Kuhlbanz
- 1998: Rosenzweigs Freiheit – Jacob Rosenzweig
- 2000: Spuk im Reich der Schatten ("Spook in the Kingdom of Shadows" – adaptation of one of a trilogy of books) (TV Movie) – Friedrich
- 2000: Mary Magdalene (TV Movie) – John the Baptist
- 2000: The Apocalypse (TV Movie) – Valerius
- 2001: Antonia – Zwischen Liebe und Macht ("Antonia – Love and Power") (TV Movie) – Moritz Ahrendorff
- 2001: Jonathans Liebe ("Jonathan's Love") (TV Movie) – Jonathan
- 2003: Luther – George Spalatin
- 2003: Nur Anfänger heiraten ("Only Beginners Marry") (TV Movie) – Hannes Mack
- 2003: Imperium: Augustus (TV Movie) – Gaius Octavius / Young Augustus
- 2003: Spuk am Tor der Zeit ("Spook at the Gate of Time" – adaptation of one of a trilogy of books)
- 2004: Italiener und andere Süßigkeiten ("Italians and Other Sweet Things") (TV Movie) – Paolo Fabrelli
- 2004: Sehnsucht nach Liebe ("Waiting for Love") (TV Movie) – Jochen Hofmann
- 2005: Letztes Kapitel (TV Movie) – Achim Pazurek
- 2006: Dresden (TV Movie) – Alexander Wenninger
- 2007: Caravaggio (TV Movie) – Onorio Longhi
- 2007: Hotel Meina – Hans Krassler
- 2007: War and Peace (TV Mini-Series) – Dolokhov
- 2007: Contergan (TV Movie) – Paul Wegener
- 2008: The Charlemagne Code (TV Movie) – Eik Meiers
- 2009: Impact (TV Mini-Series) – Roland Emerson
- 2009: Krupp: A Family Between War and Peace (TV Mini-Series) – Alfried Krupp
- 2009: Auftrag Schutzengel ("Operation Guardian Angel") (TV Movie) – Ben Sievert
- 2009: Within the Whirlwind – Pavel
- 2010: Liebe deinen Feind (TV Movie) – Captain Simon
- 2010: Mörderischer Besuch (TV Movie) – Theo von Gelden
- 2010: Paura d'amare (TV Series) – Carlo
- 2011: If Not Us, Who? – Walter Jens
- 2011: Rosa Roth (TV Series) – Fuhrmann
- 2011: The Girl on the Ocean Floor (TV Movie) – Hans Hass
- 2012: Munich '72 (TV Movie) – Ulrich Wegener
- 2012: Passion – Prosecutor
- 2012: The German Friend – Michael Tendler
- 2012: Rommel (TV Movie) – General Speidel
- 2012: The Pursuit of Unhappiness – Frank Henne
- 2013: Der Tote im Eis (TV Movie) – Gregor Lucius
- 2013: Killing All the Flies (TV Movie) – Vincent Reid
- 2013: Anna Karenina (TV Mini-Series) – Karenin
- 2013: Das Jerusalem-Syndrom (TV Movie) – Dr. Uri Peled / Lev Simons
- 2013: Pinocchio (TV Mini-Series) – Antonio
- 2014: Bocksprünge – Silvan
- 2014: The Ingredients of Love (TV Movie) – André Chabanais
- 2015: One Breath – Jan
- 2017: Wendy – Gunnar
- 2018: Luna – Jakob
- 2018: Wendy 2 – Freundschaft für immer – Gunnar
- 2019: Tribes of Europa – Jacob
