= The Twins at St. Clare's =

Children's novel

- First edition
- Author: Enid Blyton
- Illustrator: W. Lindsay Cable
- Language: English
- Series: St. Clare's
- Publisher: Methuen
- Publication date: 1941
- Publication place: United Kingdom
- Followed by: The O'Sullivan Twins

The Twins at St Clare's is a children's novel by Enid Blyton set in an English girls' boarding school. It is the first of the original six novels in Blyton´s St. Clare's series, which follows the school lives of Pat and Isabel O´Sullivan. It was first published in 1941.

== Plot summary ==
The twin sisters, Pat and Isabel O'Sullivan, having just finished preparatory school at the elite Redroofs, are expected to move on to senior school. While most of their friends are moving to the equally elite Ringmere, the twins' parents are afraid of the twins might become spoilt at an expensive boarding school. Furious at their parents' refusal to send them to the school of their choice, the twins are determined to be as difficult as possible at St. Clare's.

They are quickly mocked for their behaviour by the other students and are nicknamed the 'stuck up twins'. Only a student named Kathleen is willing to befriend them, as she is also disliked. Whilst Pat refuses to do her chores and is banned from going to town, Isabel does them for her and has Pat take her trips to the town. The twins miss their favourite sports of field hockey and tennis because only lacrosse is played at St Clare's. However, Pat excels at lacrosse. She is selected by sports captain Belinda Towers, but it is when Isabel is pretending to be Pat so the latter can go to town. Pat decides to tell the truth, and is surprised when Belinda lets her stay on the team.

Janet, a sarcastic and blunt student, leads the year in a series of pranks against their new History teacher Miss Kennedy, who is very timid and insecure though highly qualified. After Miss Roberts arrives and immediately understands that Janet the culprit, the twins take the blame as well, gaining respect. Afterwards, the girls organise a secret midnight feast, and are caught, but Miss Kennedy pretends to not have noticed anything.

Money has been going missing from all of the students causing everyone to get suspicious of a thief. Eventually, the thief steals from some seniors causing threats of expulsion. The twins discover it is Kathleen, who stole the money in order to buy her friends gifts. Her family spends a lot of money to send her to St Clare's and she wanted to seem the same as everyone else.

Janet continues to play pranks on the teachers, such as hiding a cat in Miss Kennedy's room due to her known phobia. However, one day Kathleen and the twins overhear her talking to a friend about giving up her job, despite needing the money to help her sick mother, because she cannot control the class. The girls all write a letter of apology and decide to only prank the other teachers.

Kathleen finds a stray dog and smuggles it into school where all the girls take care of it. However, it eventually escapes and is discovered, but Kathleen is allowed to keep it. Another student named Sheila is extremely posh and constantly mocked by the other girls for her way of speaking. She is eventually made prompter at the Christmas play and Janet is advised by the head girl, Winnifred, not to exploit Sheila's insecurities.

At the end of the term, the twins return home having come to appreciate St Clare's.

== Reception ==
In 2011, Stylist included the The Twins at St Clare’s in its list of "The 50 best children´s books", describing it as girl´s school story centred on the O´Sullivan twins´ initially snobbish resistance to their new school.

Writing about Blyton’s school stories, Bubla Basu noted criticism of their class assumptions, xenophobia and thin plotting, but argued that the St. Clare´s and Malory Towers books also portray pupils from varied economic and family backgrounds and give children agency in resolving conflict.

=== Adaptation ===
In Germany, Blyton´s St. Clare´s stories were adapted and localised as the Hanni und Nanni series. A German feature film Hanni & Nanni, directed by Christine Hartmann, was released in 2010 and was based on the Hanni und Nanni children´s-book series.
