= Nicholas Pinnock =

English actor

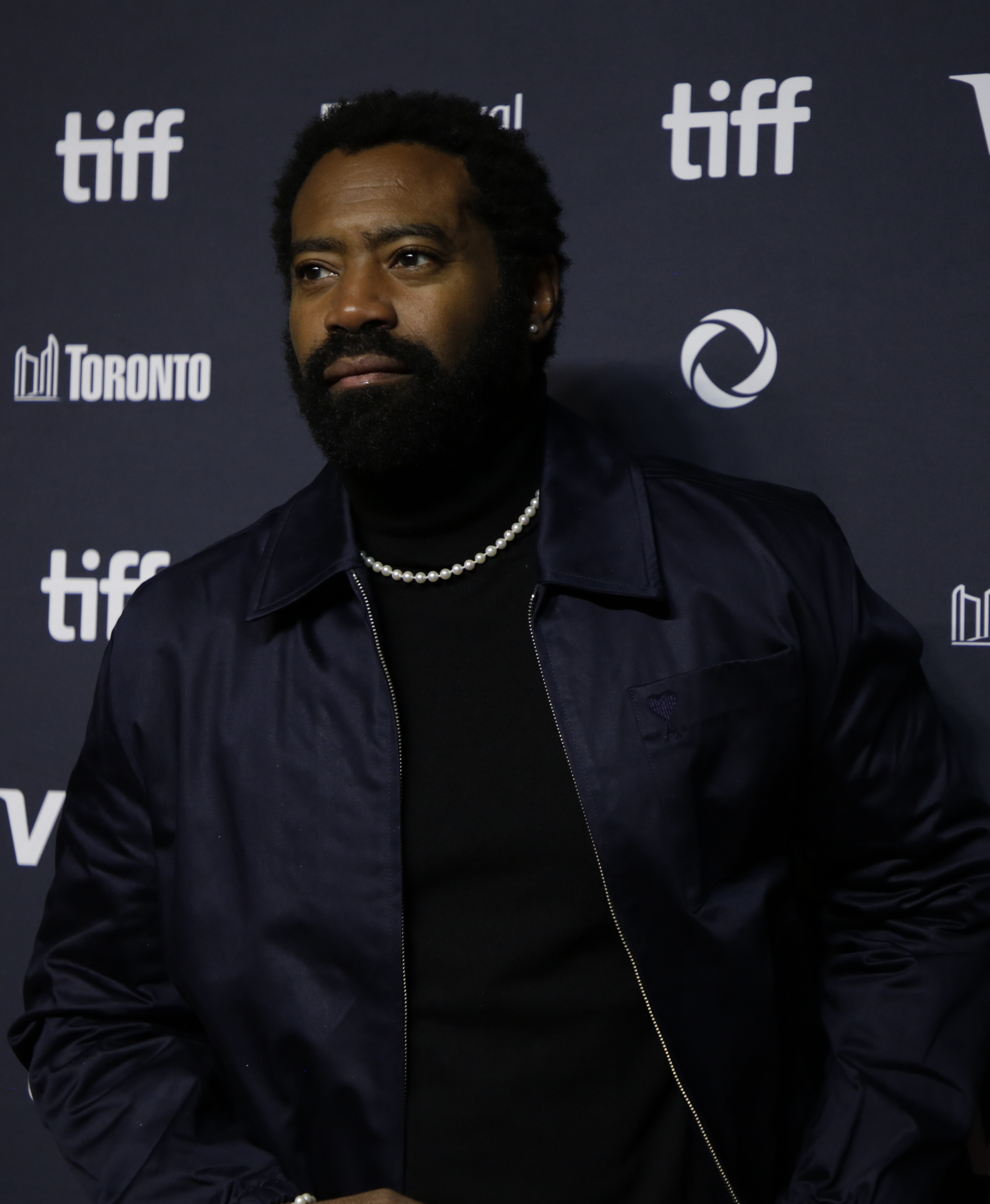
- Pinnock in 2025 at TIFF.
- Born: Nicholas Pinnock; Balham, London, England
- Education: London Studio Centre
- Occupation: Actor
- Years active: 1985–present
- Website: nicholaspinnock.com

Nicholas Pinnock is a British actor. He is known for his role as lead character Aaron Wallace in the ABC legal drama For Life and as Truman Dawes in the Peacock crime drama Long Bright River.

== Early life and education ==
Nicholas Pinnock was born in Balham, London, and is of Jamaican descent. He spent his early childhood living in Saudi Arabia.

On his return to England, he was enrolled at Corona Stage Academy in Hammersmith, London at the age of 12. While there, in his first week, he made his professional debut, landing several jobs as a model and child actor in adverts, music videos, film, and television. Continuing his vocational training, Pinnock attended a three-year musical theatre course at the London Studio Centre. After the first year, he decided acting was his first love and in the following years, concentrated on drama and contemporary dance.

After graduating, Pinnock joined Lea Anderson's Contemporary Dance Company, the Featherstonehaughs, for several years before pursuing acting full time.

== Career ==
In 1986, as a child actor, Pinnock starred in the fantasy drama TV serial Mr Magus Is Waiting for You, based on the novel by Gene Kemp and following the adventures of four young children who become trapped in the fantasy world of a mysterious magician. A year later, he became one of The Pink Windmill Kids on Emu's World on CITV.

In his 20s he regularly appeared in pantomime. He played guest roles in television programmes such as Grange Hill, EastEnders, The Bill, Dalziel and Pascoe, Footballers' Wives and Casualty. TV films followed, such as Kingdom of The Blind with Clive Owen and Diamonds with James Purefoy.

Theatre work included As You Like It at Stafford Castle at the Staffordshire Shakespeare Festival, Hampstead Theatre's production of Born Bad directed by Kathy Burke, and San Diego, directed by David Grieg and Marisa Zanotti in the Edinburgh Festival. He appeared in Topdog/Underdog in Glasgow's Citizens Theatre in 2009.

Pinnock appeared in his first Hollywood feature film, the 2011 summer blockbuster Captain America: The First Avenger, as a SHIELD Tech. That same year, he went on to play the role of Leon in a four-part drama Top Boy, which was broadcast on Channel 4 over four consecutive nights from 31 October 2011. After the 2011 England riots in London, Pinnock appeared in the BBC docudrama The Riots: In Their Own Words, The Rioters. The following year, Pinnock portrayed the role of Evan in the ITV drama The Ice Cream Girls. The three-part drama aired in April 2013.

Pinnock portrayed a young Nelson Mandela in the ITV docudrama Mandela: The Prison Years, which aired on 15 December 2013, the day Mandela was buried.

In 2015, Pinnock showcased the role of Frank Sutter in Fortitude on Sky Atlantic. The same year saw the release of his next two films, Monsters: Dark Continent, the sequel to Monsters in which he plays the role of Forrest, and The Keeping Room, portraying the role of Bill.

In November 2015, he played Jay "The Sport" Jackson in The Royale at the Bush Theatre in London.

In 2016, Pinnock played Jason Backland on ITV's crime drama Marcella series 1 and 2, alongside Anna Friel. The series aired on ITV on 4 April 2016. He then appeared as Ian Shaw in Counterpart, a science fiction thriller first aired on 10 December 2017.

In September 2019, Pinnock appeared in the first season of Criminal: UK on Netflix.

Pinnock was cast as lead character Aaron Wallace in For Life, an American legal drama television series created by Hank Steinberg and executive producer Curtis "50 Cent" Jackson. The series was inspired by the life of Isaac Wright, Jr, who was serving a life sentence for a wrongful conviction, but got himself exonerated and became a defense lawyer. The series premiered on ABC on 11 February 2020. and ran for two seasons.

In 2022, he was cast as Jesus in Jeymes Samuel's The Book of Clarence.

Pinnock played John Ellis in Django, a 2023 television series for Sky and Canal+, alongside Noomi Rapace, Matthias Schoenaerts and Lisa Vicari.

Pinnock was cast in This Town, alongside Michelle Dockery and Jordan Bolger, a 2024 six-part British television series for BBC One written and created by Steven Knight. He was also cast alongside Tessa Thompson in Hedda, an American drama film written and directed by Nia DaCosta, based on the play Hedda Gabler by Henrik Ibsen.

== Awards and nominations ==
In December 2022, Pinnock was announced as winner in the Best Actor category at the British Urban Film Festival awards in London.

== Charity work ==
Pinnock is an ambassador for the mental health charity, Mind UK.

== Filmography ==
=== Film ===
Year	Title	Role	Notes
1999	New World Disorder	Weldon	
2009	Little Foxes	Mike	
2011	Captain America: The First Avenger	SHIELD Tech	
2014	The Keeping Room	Bill	
2014	Monsters: Dark Continent	Sergeant Forrest	
2018	VS.	Terry	
2019	The Last Tree	Mr. Williams	
2019	Dark Encounter	Sheriff Reese Jordan	
2023	The Book of Clarence	Jesus	
2024	The Assessment	Walter	
2024	Here	Devon Harris	
2025	Hedda	Judge Roland Brack	
TBA	Bare	TBA	Filming

=== Television ===
Year	Title	Role	Notes
1986	Mr Magus Is Waiting for You	Jeff	Television film
1987–1988	Emu's Wide World, Emu's World Series 6	Himself	Miscredited as "Nicholas Pinnick" on one occasion, otherwise credited as Children from the Corona Stage School
1989	Happy Families	Billy Bone	Episode: "Master Bun the Baker's Boy: Part 2"
1989–1997	The Bill	Various roles	5 episodes
1992	EastEnders	Wesley	3 episodes
1995	Grange Hill	Jerome Cairns	Recurring role
1998	Casualty	Reuben Myers	Episode: "Loco Parentis"
2000	The Knock	Mugger	Episode #5.2
2000	Second Sight: Kingdom of the Blind	Ben Harris	Television film
2002	In Deep	Danny	2 episodes
2003	Spine Chillers	Jon	Episode: "Fairy Godfather"
2003, 2006	Doctors	Jason Hutton / James Marsden	2 episodes
2004	Holby City	Carl Stoves	Episode: "Pastures New"
2005	Coming to England	Dardie	Television film
2006	Dalziel and Pascoe	Stephen Japp	2 episodes
2006	Footballers' Wives	Dean	2 episodes
2009	Diamonds	Isaiah Forman	Television film
2010	The Deep	Charlie Goodison	Episode: "To the Furthest Place"
2011	Top Boy	Leon	4 episodes
2013	The Ice Cream Girls	Evan	3 episodes
2013	Mandela: The Prison Years	Nelson Mandela	Television film
2015	A.D. The Bible Continues	Arik	2 episodes
2015	Fortitude	Frank Sutter	11 episodes
2015	Midwinter of the Spirit	Bishop Mick Hunter	3 episodes
2016	Barbarians Rising	Hannibal	Episode: "Resistance"
2016–2018	Marcella	Jason Backland	12 episodes
2017	Guerrilla	Julian Clarke	Episode #1.1
2018–2019	Counterpart	Ian Shaw	14 episodes
2019	Criminal: UK	DI Paul Ottager	3 episodes
2020–2021	For Life	Aaron Wallace	Main role
2022–2023	Django	John Ellis	10 episodes
2024	This Town	Deuce Williams	6 episodes
2024	Suspect	Joseph	Episode: "Joseph"
2025	Long Bright River	Truman Dawes	8 Episodes
2026	Two Weeks in August	Solomon	Main role
2026	Fightland	Kingsley Marshall	Main role
