= The Second Form at St. Clare's =

Book by Enid Blyton

- First edition
- Author: Enid Blyton
- Illustrator: W. Lindsay Cable
- Language: English
- Series: St. Clare's
- Publisher: Methuen
- Publication date: 1944
- Publication place: United Kingdom
- Preceded by: Summer Term at St. Clare's
- Followed by: Third Form at St.Clare's

The Second Form at St. Clares is the fourth novel in the St. Clare's series of children's school stories by Enid Blyton. The series is about the boarding school adventures of twin girls Patricia and Isabel O'Sullivan. Their form mistress is now Miss Jenks and they no longer have to bear the severeness of the first form mistress, Miss Roberts – who is extremely sarcastic and firm but can be kind when she feels like to, a bit like Mam'zelle, the French teacher that used to teach and is still teaching the girls.

== Plot summary ==
The second form includes two girls who have been kept back from the third form and two new girls. The two old girls are Elsie Fanshawe and Anna Johnson. Both are disliked as Elsie is spiteful and Anna is very lazy; however, both are made head of their form, replacing Hilary Wentworth who was head in first form. The second form mistress, Miss Jenks, has doubts about this as Elsie and Anna do not like each other very much, but agrees to let both of them try.

The two new girls are Gladys Hilman and Mirabel Unwin. Gladys is miserable because her mother, who is her only family, is very ill in hospital although she does not tell anyone this. Gladys rarely speaks or joins in and so is nicknamed "The Misery Girl". It takes Mirabel to find out what is wrong with her. Mirabel is determined to make the worst of things and ruin the class for everyone. She was sent away from home because of her behaviour towards her younger brother and sister as well as her mother and father. Mirabel's attitude leads her into trouble when Carlotta slaps her in public for ruining a play rehearsal, but Mirabel learns her lesson and forgives Carlotta. Later she admits to Isabel that she is ashamed of her behaviour and wants to be friends with the girls instead. When Elsie attempts to convince the form to perform a series of punishments against Mirabel in retaliation for her attitude in class, Isabel sticks up for her and manages to convince the class that Elsie is not acting in their interest but is just acting out of spite. As a result of this, Mirabel and Isabel become friends. Mirabel initially declares she wants to leave at half term, but ends up staying when Pat and Isabel stand up for her and the girls decide to give her a chance.

Although at first they do not get on well, an unlikely friendship later develops between Gladys and Mirabel, as they help each other cope with their first time in boarding school. Mirabel turns out to be a talented musician and Gladys a gifted actor, and the class manage to use these talents to ease the two girls into the way of things at the school.

The term passes by eventfully, and Anna becomes a surprisingly popular head girl, throwing aside her laziness. When Elsie is stripped of her position, Anna takes to her new position of sole head girl with a new-found enthusiasm and discovers she actually enjoys the sense of responsibility she feels at helping others and setting a good example. When Mrs Theobald refuses to let Mirabel send a telegram home asking for her violin, mistakenly thinking that Mirabel has only stopped misbehaving because she has got tired of it, she confides in Anna, who goes to see the Headmistress and explains to her that Mirabel is in fact ashamed of herself and wants to do better. As a result of Anna's directness, Mirabel is allowed to send the telegram and Anna is admired and respected by all of the other girls for performing such a kindly act.

A concert given by the girls proves a huge success, but Elsie is forbidden to take part as a result of her behaviour towards Anna when the decision was made to strip Elsie of her position as joint head girl. Anna and Carlotta both offer Elsie an olive branch, but Elsie has still not learned her lesson after being left out and sets out to ruin a birthday party given by Carlotta as revenge. However Hilary discovers Elsie's plan, and instead of holding the party the evening of Carlotta's birthday as planned, the girls hold a midnight feast the night before instead. Elsie gets into trouble as a result when her plan to expose the private party backfires. There is also a new drama mistress this year, Miss Quentin. Alison chooses to worship her (she always finds someone each year). However, at the end of the term, Alison is badly let down by Miss Quentin when she finds out that the mistress laughs at her behind her back and chose Gladys over her for the principal role in the play. She finally finds some dignity and is then very cold to Miss Quentin and snubs her.

At term's end, Anna is told she is now ready to go up to the Third Form due to her much improved behaviour. Elsie is also granted passage into the Third Form after she apologises to Anna and Carlotta for trying to ruin the birthday party, but is told that she is on her last chance and that she must drop her malicious and spiteful attitude if she wants to stay there, and that one mistake will see her expelled from the school.

== Main characters ==
=== Isabel O’Sullivan ===
Isabel is the twin sister of Pat and shares many similarities with her twin. It is suggested that Isabel is better at keeping her temper than Pat. She is part Irish and good at sport, as she is eager to play and was picked for several matches in the first form. Though there are various girls who are focused on particularly in each book, the main focus throughout the series is on Isabel and Pat. The main focus on Isabel in the book is her sticking up for, and befriending, the defiant newcomer Mirabel Unwin

=== Patricia 'Pat' O’Sullivan ===
Pat is the twin sister of Isabel and very similar to her. They both enjoy working together, love sports, and are each other's best friend. They also look practically identical. Pat has a slightly hotter temper than Isabel. In the Christmas show Pat performs a comical dialogue with Isabel but they don't think it is very good compared to the other acts.

=== Elsie Fanshawe ===
Elsie stayed down in the second form for the term – she should have really gone up to the third form. She is spiteful and Carlotta calls her 'Catty Elisie'. There is a feud between her and the rest of the form. When Carlotta tries to invite her to her midnight feast, Elsie refuses, though she wants to go and plots to ruin it for the second formers. When Elsie sees Miss Theobald at the end of term Miss Theobald says she is not up to go to the third form in either behaviour or work, though she is too old to be in the second form. This suggests she may have a learning problem or just doesn't try very hard. At the very end of the book, Elsie shows a bit of a change in spirit and is nice to Gladys, who is sad that her mother is ill. Elsie is the main antagonist of the book but isn't mentioned in any other books in the series, so it is unknown whether she really turns over a new leaf or whether she reverts to her old ways.

== Other ==
- Later reprints of the book change from Carlotta slapping Mirabel for ruining a Drama class to her stepping on her toe.
- Gladys mentions that during the summer she has to stay at school due to her mother being ill and having no other family, she will be the only one there apart from two other girls whose parents are in India. It is later discovered that Hilary Wentworth was probably one of these girls as she doesn't come back for the sixth form as she is going to join her parents there.
