= Summer Term at St. Clare's =

1943 novel by Enid Blyton

- First edition
- Author: Enid Blyton
- Illustrator: W. Lindsay Cable
- Language: English
- Series: St. Clare's
- Subject: Boarding, Classic
- Publisher: Methuen
- Publication date: 1943
- Publication place: United Kingdom
- Preceded by: The O'Sullivan Twins
- Followed by: The Second Form at St. Clare's

Summer Term at St. Clare's is the third novel in the St. Clare's series of girls' school stories by British author Enid Blyton. The series is about the boarding school adventures of twin girls Patricia and Isabel O'Sullivan.

== Plot summary ==
The children's story starts with the twins Pat and Isabel O'Sullivan looking forward to enjoying their first summer term at St. Clare's. Their mother is happy to see them looking forward to school. One day, they go to play tennis with a friend, and meet a girl who has mumps. The twins, to their dismay, are put in quarantine, and are not allowed to go back to school at the beginning of the term.

When they arrive back the following week, they are heartily welcomed by their friends. Five new girls have joined their form; an American girl named Sadie, who is obviously quite rich and elegant; a wild-looking girl named Carlotta, who is half Spanish; a naughty but very likeable girl, Bobby (Roberta), who quickly becomes friends with Janet; Prudence, who is quite pretty but has no sense of humour.; and Pam, who is very hard working but also very shy. The twins discover that their cousin Alison has already made friends with Sadie.

The girls soon discover that Miss Roberts is on the war path. She is the first form head and is determined that her girls should do well and be promoted in next form. The twins also get to know the new girls. Prudence turns out to be nasty, spiteful, and dishonest. She takes a strong dislike to Carlotta, and discovers that Carlotta once belonged to a circus. She reveals Carlotta's secret to the other girls, hoping it will make them despise her, but it only serves to make Carlotta even more popular. Prudence also manipulates the shy Pam under the false disguise of a friendship. As a result, Pam is initially disliked by all of the girls except Carlotta and Isabel, who take pity on her when they realise that she is afraid to tackle Prudence as she does not want to be on her own. Encouraged by the two older girls, Pam eventually stands up to Prudence and ends their forced friendship, becoming friends with Carlotta instead. Bobby initially doesn't seem to care for anything or anyone until Miss Theobald tells her that she is cheating her parents badly. After learning this, Bobby starts working hard, too, though she occasionally plays tricks.

The American girl, Sadie, like Alison, is always caring about her looks. She also hates sports and all outdoor activities (although, unlike Alison, she actually enjoys swimming). However, she is good tempered and laughs at being teased. The girls soon find out that Sadie is an heiress. Sadie's father died and left a will giving away all his money to his sisters, but Sadie's mother won it back through lawsuits. During the term, while Prudence is spying on Carlotta, Sadie is kidnapped, and Carlotta - who finds her tied up, gagged and blindfolded in the back seat of a motor car - goes after her, and stages a fake road accident, during which she manages to rescue her with the help of her circus' friends. The term ends happily for most, with Prudence leaving because everyone hates her for her part in Sadie's kidnap (she could have alerted Sadie to the fact that she was in danger when she and Pam met a strange man lurking around the school entrance but was too busy trying to get Carlotta into trouble to realise this, and ignored Pam's warning to report the man to Miss Theobald), Sadie herself bouncing back strongly from her kidnapping ordeal and preparing to go back to America, and the other girls looking forward to going into second year except Prudence, who is leaving and Pam, who is too young to move into the second form.
