= Claudine at St.Clare's =

Book by Enid Blyton

- First edition
- Author: Enid Blyton
- Illustrator: W. Lindsay Cable
- Language: English
- Series: St. Clare's
- Publisher: Methuen
- Publication date: 1944
- Publication place: United Kingdom
- Preceded by: Kitty at St. Clare's
- Followed by: Fifth Formers at St. Clare's
- Text: Claudine at St.Clare's online

Claudine at St. Clare's is the seventh novel in the St. Clare's series by Enid Blyton. The narrative follows the O'Sullivan twins, Patricia and Isabel, and their adventures at exclusive boarding school St Clare's. The book introduces four new characters: Claudine, the French mistress' niece; Eileen, whose mother joins the school as matron; Pauline, a wannabe rich girl; and Angela, a rich and spoiled society girl.

== Plot summary ==
When Pat and Isabel arrive at school, they are surprised to meet a new matron and her daughter, Eileen. Then, French teacher Mam'zelle introduces Claudine, her niece, who will be joining them for this term. Alison O'Sullivan, the twins' rather silly, 'feather-headed' cousin, meets and befriends Angela, who is rich, beautiful and well dressed. Soon, Alison is completely under the spoilt, snobbish Angela's spell. The new Matron's daughter Eileen is a reserved girl who is later identified as a sneak. Pauline is soon discovered to be a snobbish and conceited girl who continuously brags about her family's 'wealth'.

During the inevitable midnight feast the girls find themselves in trouble when Matron is spitefully locked for hours in a broom cupboard by Claudine while they were having the feast. She is furious to find that she is released by her daughter, and thinks that she was with the other girls, while actually she was speaking with her brother Eddie, who lost his job but doesn't dare to tell his mother. Eileen is in trouble.

Pauline suffers a worse fate than Eileen when her mother visits unexpectedly and is happened upon by Alison and Angela, who mistake the poor, worn-out woman for one of the cooks. Pauline, like Eileen, is exposed as working class. Angela is scornful to discover that all Pauline's boasts of wealth are lies, and that she is ashamed of her lower-class background.

The more compassionate Alison, however, takes pity on Pauline's mother, and to her credit, stands up to Angela's snobbish and domineering attitude, vowing not to fall under her thrall in the future. Alison also makes this action because of the awful behaviour of Angela's mother at half-term. Even she felt that though beautiful, Angela's mother was horrible and Alison was also secretly pleased when the brave and mischievous Claudine fell into the water from a balcony so that Angela's mother gets wet, even though Claudine hates the water.

Near the end of the book Matron reveals that someone is stealing food, money and even stamps from her. It is written that Eileen stole the things in order to feed Eddie and apply for a new job. When Eddie does get employed, Eileen and Eddie go to Miss Theobald to confess about the stealing, for they heard that Pauline had been accused of this even though she had been taking money from her mother's bank account (In a short section also Claudine is suspected for stealing, for she suddenly has a lot of money and buys expensive birthday presents, but it turns out that she sold her lovely cushion cover that Mam'zelle showed to everyone at half term to Alison's mother.) Miss Theobald sends Eileen and Eddie into her other room next door, and calls for Matron. She tells her that she knows who stole from her, and asks Matron whether the girl should be expelled or not, since it was Matron who had been stolen from. The unkind Matron insists that the girl should be expelled, and is then lead to Eileen and Eddie. Matron cannot believe her eyes, and then sees the trap she fell into. She leaves St. Clare's at the end of the year with her children, but Eileen sends a last letter to Alison thanking her for inviting her to eat together at half-term.

== Themes and morality ==
As is typical in Blyton's boarding school novels, class lines are drawn sharply. St Clare's is an upper middle-class domain, and its pupils are from the upper middle-class (if not always fabulously wealthy) backgrounds, with one or two "Honourables" from the upper classes. With wealth, however, comes responsibility – the girls are expected to treat any working-class people with the respect that goes with their own privileged positions. Working-class girls are seen to try to fit into St Clare's by deception, but their class lies are unmasked, to their great shame. Being working class is not considered intrinsically bad, but working-class girls are expected to know their place in society and are not able to fit into the St Clare's milieu. Eileen, for example, is the daughter of Matron, and has a brother with a working-class name – Eddie – who gets into trouble. All these things are marks of a working-class girl. This book shows a moral – Never judge others or yourself from the amount of wealth you have, or family background; always see one for the person they are.
