= The O'Sullivan Twins =

Book by Enid Blyton

- First edition
- Author: Enid Blyton
- Illustrator: W. Lindsay Cable
- Language: English
- Series: St. Clare's
- Subject: Boarding, Classic
- Publisher: Methuen
- Publication date: 1942
- Publication place: United Kingdom
- Preceded by: The Twins at St. Clare's
- Followed by: Summer Term at St. Clare's

The O'Sullivan Twins is the second in the St. Clare's series of children's novels by Enid Blyton. It was first published in 1942 by Methuen.

== Plot summary ==
Pat and Isabel O'Sullivan depart for their second term at St Clare's with their cousin Alison. Alison is described as having a different personality from her cousins, while being noted for her character.

Other new characters include Lucy Oriell and Margery Fenworthy. Lucy is the archetypal school story girl — bright, kind and popular. Her father is a painter and Lucy herself is a talented artist. Margery is sulky, sullen, rude, antisocial and the other girls suspect she is older than them, nearer to sixteen years old. She also constantly acts up in class and is rude to teachers, who let her to the girls' shock, although she shows a rare bit of kindness after being picked for a lacrosse match over the others.

A second former named Tessie holds a midnight feast for her birthday, but only invites a few as she cannot afford enough. She decides to invite Janet and the twins from first form, who in turn decide to steal a frying pan to have sausages. Another second former named Erica begins to suspect that there is a party and eventually threatens the information out of Gladys, a scullery maid. Erica decides not to snitch and instead steal food when Tessie manages to sneak them in, but is caught by her. Erica vows to stop the party. She snitches on them to Mam'zelle who catches the girls frying sausages. The girls originally believe the snitch to be Margery, whose relationship with the rest of first form has been worsening, but Gladys tells the truth. They punish her by sending her to Coventry, and Erica seemingly accepts the punishment but vows revenge.

After Margery argues with the history teacher and throws a pen at her, the girls have had enough and decide to cut her out. Pat leads the year in this, causing them to not cheer for her in lacrosse even after she scores three goals. Erica ruins Pat's jumper she was knitting and on a nature walk ruins her project, framing Margery for both. At half term, Alison learns Margery was expelled from her previous school and tells everyone after Erica frames Margery for more torment against Pat.

Margery pretends not to care about her increased exclusion, but only Lucy seems to care about her feelings. A fire starts in the medical block leaving Erica trapped on a high floor, which Margery rescues her from, becoming a heroine in the process. Erica feels compelled to tell the truth, and is asked to leave St Clare's as a result, although she is allowed to stay until the end of term to keep reputation. Margery reveals her stepmother hates her and her father takes her side, causing her bad moods. Lucy writes a letter home to her father who promises to try to be better to Margery.

Lucy's father is in an accident leaving his hands permanently damaged and unable to paint, so he can no longer afford to keep Lucy at St Clare's. Margery manages to convince the head teacher to allow her to apply for a scholarship, despite only older years being eligible. Lucy goes up against several older years, but prevails and is moved up to second form alongside Margery as a result.

Janet puts beetles into Mamzelle's spectacle case and then the girls pretend they can't see them, leading Mamzelle to believe she is going mad. Mamzelle eventually checks into the nurses wing where she expresses stress over having to work and nurse her sick sister. Janet brings her flowers to apologise, and Mamzelle is so glad she isn't mad but her crazy laughter almost convinces Matron she is going mad for a second time.

== Main characters ==
- Pat O'Sullivan : One of the twins, known for her strong personality and talent for lacrosse.
- Isabel O'Sullivan : One of the twins, often seen as more thoughtful and kind than her sister.
- Mr. O'Sullivan : Pat O'Sullivan and Isabel O'Sullivan's father.
- Mrs. O'Sullivan : Pat O'Sullivan and Isabel O'Sullivan's mother.
- Aunt Sarah : Alison O'Sullivan mother and sister of Mr. O'Sullivan and paternal aunt of Pat O'Sullivan and Isabel O'Sullivan.
- Alison O'Sullivan :The twins' cousin, described as vain and somewhat silly.
- Margery Fenworthy: Initially presented as sullen and rude, but later reveals a difficult home life.
- Lucy Oriell :A talented and friendly girl who quickly becomes popular.
- Tessie :A second former who invites some of the girls to a midnight feast.
- Nora
- Erica (antagonist): An unpopular second former, known for being spiteful.
- Winifred James : The head Girl.
- Belinda Towers
- Hilary Wentworth : A famous painter.
- Mam'zelle: The French teacher at St. Clare's, often a target for the girls' pranks.
- Doris El ward
- Miss Roberts
- Matron
- Janet Robins
- Miss. Theobald
- Kathleen Gregory
- Shelia Naylor
- Rita George
- Miss Lewis
- Winnie
- Miss Jenks
- Katie White
- Miss Kennedy : The timid and insecure history teacher.
- Gladys: A scullery maid who provides information about a midnight feast.
