= For Life (TV series) =

American legal drama television series

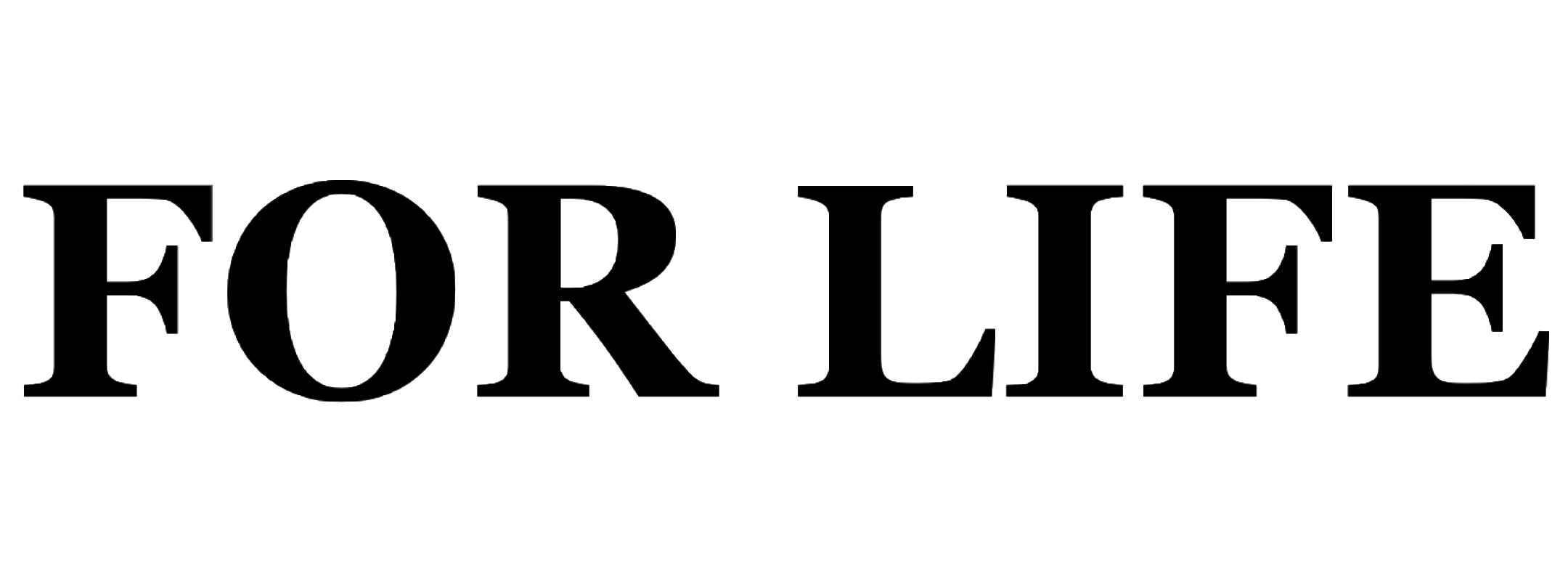
- Genre: Crime drama; Legal drama
- Created by: Hank Steinberg
- Starring: Nicholas Pinnock; Indira Varma; Joy Bryant; Mary Stuart Masterson; Dorian Crossmond Missick; Tyla Harris; Glenn Fleshler; Boris McGiver; Timothy Busfield; John Doman
- Music by: James S. Levine; Dustin O'Halloran
- Country of origin: United States
- Original language: English
- No. of seasons: 2
- No. of episodes: 23

Production
- Executive producers: Isaac Wright Jr.; George Tillman, Jr.; Alison Greenspan; Curtis "50 Cent" Jackson; Doug Robinson; Hank Steinberg; Russell Fine; David Feige; Sonay Hoffman; Kerry Orent
- Producer: Nicholas Pinnock
- Editor: Michael Hathaway
- Camera setup: Single-camera
- Running time: 43 minutes
- Production companies: Channel Road Productions; G-Unit Film & Television; Doug Robinson Productions; ABC Signature (Note: Credited as ABC Studios for (season 1)); Sony Pictures Television Studios

Original release
- Network: ABC
- Release: February 11, 2020 – February 24, 2021

For Life is an American legal drama television series created by Hank Steinberg that premiered on ABC on February 11, 2020. The series is inspired by the true story of Isaac Wright Jr., who was imprisoned for a crime that he did not commit; he obtained a law degree after he was exonerated (unlike in the series). While incarcerated, he helped overturn the wrongful convictions of twenty of his fellow inmates, before finally proving his own innocence. In June 2020, the series was renewed for a second season which premiered on November 18, 2020. In May 2021, the series was canceled after two seasons.

== Premise ==
The series focuses on Aaron Wallace, who has been sentenced to life in prison for a crime he did not commit. While incarcerated, Wallace becomes a lawyer and works as a defense attorney for others while striving to get his own sentence overturned. The series is loosely based on the life of Isaac Wright Jr.

== Cast ==
=== Main ===
- Nicholas Pinnock as Aaron Wallace, a former club owner convicted of drug trafficking, although in truth, the drugs actually belonged to one of his friends. Now serving a life sentence with no possibility of parole, he earns a license to practice law and works to help his fellow inmates in court. He is based on Isaac Wright Jr.
- Indira Varma as Safiya Masry, the warden who oversees the prison where Wallace is serving his sentence. She is reform-minded, and helps him as best she can, but their relationship is strained by her need to look out for her own family's interests.
- Joy Bryant as Marie Wallace, Aaron's wife, who has entered into a new relationship with Darius, one of his friends. Although she is sympathetic to her husband's plight, she also feels a need to move on and leave him in the past.
- Mary Stuart Masterson as Anya Harrison (season 1), Safiya's wife, who is running for Attorney General of New York State.
- Dorian Crossmond Missick as Jamal Bishop, Aaron's closest friend in prison. He occasionally helps Aaron prepare cases.
- Tyla Harris as Jasmine Wallace, Aaron's teenage daughter. Unlike her mother, she has never stopped believing in her father and dreams of him returning home one day.
- Glenn Fleshler as Frank Foster (season 1), a senior corrections officer at the prison. Like most of his fellow guards, he dislikes Aaron.
- Boris McGiver as Glen Maskins (season 1; guest season 2), the prosecutor who led the team that put Aaron away, and who is now running for state Attorney General. He scorns his old foe's desire to clear his name, and will do whatever it takes, including blackmail, to keep him locked up for good.
- Timothy Busfield as Henry Roswell, a former New York state senator who assists Aaron in his quest to become a lawyer, and later helps him prepare to argue for his retrial in court.
- John Doman as Alan Burke (recurring season 1; starring season 2), The attorney general of the state of New York.

=== Recurring ===
- Brandon J. Dirden as Darius Johnson, Aaron's best friend who initially doubted him but later assists him during his retrial after finding new evidence suggesting Aaron is not guilty.
- Erik Jensen as Dez O'Reilly, An assistant district attorney who works for Maskins.
- 50 Cent as Cassius Dawkins, A dangerous inmate that is transferred to Bellmore by Maskins. Once there, he immediately causes problems for Aaron, Frank, and Safiya.
- Peter Greene as Wild Bill Miller, The leader of the white supremacy gang at Bellmore.
- Felonious Munk as Hassan Nawaz, a prisoner at Bellmore in season one, released in season two.
- Joseph Siravo as Jerry McCormack, The head of the prison board who oversees Bellmore and other correctional facilities. He signed the order that allowed Cassius Dawkins to be transferred to Bellmore.
- Matt Dellapina as Tom Hansen, Safiya's assistant who helps her in monitoring all areas of the Bellmore Correctional facility.
- Toney Goins as Ronnie Baxter, Jasmine's boyfriend and the father of her child.
- Sean Boyce Johnson as Scotty Williams, The probation officer assigned to Aaron when he is released.
- Royce Johnson as Andy Josiah and Marcel's father. (season 2)
- Amina Robinson as Elaine Josiah, Andy's wife, and Marcel's mother. (season 2)
- Jace Bently as Marcel Josiah, Andy and Elaine's son. (season 2)

== Episodes ==
=== Series overview ===
Season	Episodes	Originally released	
Season	Episodes	First released	Last released
1	13	February 11, 2020	May 12, 2020
2	10	November 18, 2020	February 24, 2021

=== Season 1 (2020) ===
No. overall	No. in season	Title	Directed by	Written by	Original release date	U.S viewers (millions)
1	1	"Pilot"	George Tillman, Jr.	Hank Steinberg	February 11, 2020	3.15
Newly certified as a defense attorney, Aaron Wallace picks up his first case by agreeing to represent José Rodriguez. José was convicted of purchasing drugs that his girlfriend, Molly, overdosed on and nearly died from. The case pits him against O'Reilly, a prosecutor under Glen Maskins, his nemesis and the man responsible for his life sentence. Maskins orders O'Reilly to sabotage Aaron's defense by removing the only two witnesses he has. With no other evidence, the case seems doomed and Wallace finds himself contemplating failure. Wallace resorts to deception, forging a note from Molly to get the judge to put her on the stand. She then admits she lied under oath in the original trial, meaning José's sentence is reversed and he is allowed to go free. Wallace's ally, Warden Safiya Masry, tells him to stop antagonizing Maskins as she fears it will harm her wife's campaign for District Attorney. Aaron seems to agree, but when his daughter Jasmine visits him and says she's pregnant, he decides to do whatever he has to in order to get his conviction overturned.
2	2	"Promises"	Russell Fine	Hank Steinberg	February 18, 2020	2.58
Aaron must honor a debt he owes to Wild Bill, the leader of a white supremacist gang who wants one of its members, Joey Knox, released from solitary. Aaron takes the case knowing that doing so will make him enemies with the guards and other black inmates. He discovers that Knox was in a secret gay relationship with his Asian cellmate, for which Bill intends to kill him. At the hearing, a guard is forced to admit that he deliberately ignored Knox's pleas for help. This causes Joey to be released while Warden Masry arranges for him to be transferred to a different prison. With his debt cleared, Aaron is free to continue with his plan to sue the NYPD so his police file will be released. However, Maskins' office persuades a judge that doing so would endanger a confidential source, and so the request is denied. Aaron is contacted by Ronnie, Jasmine's boyfriend, who asks him to agree to stop letting Jasmine visit him every week. After learning the real reason why Aaron is trying to get his sentence reversed, Masry tells him she won't object to his plan to go after Maskins.
3	3	"Brother's Keeper"	Russell Fine	Hank Steinberg	February 25, 2020	2.50
With the Warden now on his side, Wallace takes on prison inmate Hassan's case. He wants Hassan's brother, a police officer, to testify that Hassan pleaded guilty while detoxing. Talking to Hassan, the Mayor hears what Wallace is planning to do. When reviewing the security footage at the prison, they see first-hand Wallace give his wife the forged note. At court, Hassan's brother testified but Aaron did not do enough to convince the judge and loses. Marie is questioned by the Mayor, and Wallace apologizes to his ex-wife for bringing her into this. In the end, Wallace calls Hassan's brother again and he presents new findings. If the newfound evidence is successful, they can change the judge's mind. But it doesn't and they lose the case. Later at the prison, Marie brings him his police file, and Wallace tells her this package is going to get him home.
4	4	"Marie"	Charles Martin	Sonay Hoffman	March 10, 2020	2.60
In a flashback one year before Aaron's arrest, he and his wife celebrate their new future, building a night club with Angela and Michael and having more children together. After the party, Wallace tells Marie to abandon her nursing career for heading the club. When they dance, the DEA comes out and arrests him. One day later, they see each other in Rikers Island prison, and Aaron admits the dealing of Michael with the authorities. Eight months later, Jasmine celebrates another birthday as Marie and Darius embrace. In prison, Aaron learns that Michael and Angela have been turned and accuse him of being a druglord. Marie and his lawyer implore Aaron to plead guilty, but he refuses. In the present, Wallace is forced to listen to witness testimonies of him being a crime lord. In some time-jumps, Marie becomes a nurse with Darius by her side and breaks up with Aaron. Until the present day, she is conflicted about her own feelings.
5	5	"Witness"	Guillermo Navarro	Hank Steinberg	March 17, 2020	2.35
Warden Masry interviews Smitty about the drugs brought into the prison and learns that inmate Bill is responsible. In the meantime, Aaron brings a new case by Hassan about the same inmate who is locked up for a robbery charge. Meanwhile, Maskins sends men over to Marie's office to scare her, and when Jasmine learns this, she helps her father by looking up witnesses from his case file. In his cell, Wallace tells his wife, on the phone, that he feels bad for supporting a guilty inmate. At the same time, the Warden brings in police dogs to crack down on drugs after raids in the cells. Finding nothing, she brings Bill into her office to make a deal, but the inmate replies that he'll think about it. After this meeting, the inmate's distrust in Aaron grows. At the big day in court, he can implicate Adam and Dez in his case which leads to O'Reilly offering a cash settlement in exchange for having Bill stay behind bars. Warden slows down on her war on drugs and Aaron and Marie start communicating via text.
6	6	"Burner"	Guillermo Navarro	Eric Haywood	March 24, 2020	2.38
At the prison, Frank gives a new load of drugs to wild Bill. Meanwhile, Maskins makes a deal to transfer a difficult prisoner into Bellmore. With new evidence, Wallace heads back to court. Marie's father gives Darius a ring to propose with, but soon after, Darius and Marie have a big fight about the money Marie is spending to help Aaron. The new inmate, Dawkins, brings chaos to the prison. After the court case Aaron sees the name "Angelo Torres" in the warrant file and decides to interrogate him. Unfortunately, Dawkins puts him in a difficult position about the burner phone that forces him to hand it over after having discovered Dawkins used it. Marie's father visits the prison to ask Aaron to let Marie go. At the end of the episode Frank comes home to find his family tied up at gunpoint by two men sent by Dawkins.
7	7	"Do Us Part"	Russell Fine	Hank Steinberg & Garen Thomas	March 31, 2020	2.37
Cassius uses his power in the prison to keep Aaron from making any calls. Frank realises that he needs help to keep the drug trade going; so, he tries to find something he can use against Cassius in court. Marie and Darius ally together to question Michael at his house about Angelo, and he gives them some very important information. In prison, Aaron stirs up trouble by taking on the case of inmate Nathan Goodleaf. He wants to marry his terminally ill girlfriend. Aaron intends to sue the prison board with Safiya as a witness, but in the end, the judge rules in favour of the board. Despite this, Safiya decides to begin family visits and the first to be approved are Nathan and his partner. They marry and Aaron realizes how much he cares for Marie and still loves her.
8	8	"Daylight"	Russell Fine	David Feige	April 7, 2020	2.33
Aaron and Henry build a case against Maskins. Cassius makes his move in the shower and hits wild Bill and his gang. After the fight, he realises he needs legal advice and calls Wallace. Aaron agrees to help but wants a favor in return. Later in court, Aaron manages to convince the judge that Cassius is the victim, and he is free to go. Because of this, Cassius returns his burner to Aaron. Marie returns home to find that Darius has left.
9	9	"Buried"	Erica Watson	Hope Mastras	April 14, 2020	2.18
Aaron uncovers a new witness, Anna Fernandez, in a case he is working on. She was so traumatized she disappeared, but Henry finds her and convinces her to testify. Anna gives her story and in doing so saves the defendant's life, which worries Maskins. In the prison, the warden discovers that Cassius is the main distributor of the drugs. The warden promises to defend the person who gave her this information, but not long after, he quits working for the prison. Jasmien opens up a social media group to get word out about her father's case. This leads to a new person coming forward who was omitted from his case.
10	10	"Switzerland"	Jann Turner	Zach Calig	April 21, 2020	2.18
Jamal was beaten by a guard as a warning sign from Cassius. Cassius calls Wallace over for legal advice, but he refuses the help after hearing about the new girl from the social media group. A fight breaks out in the gym and develops into a revolt. Jamal attacks Cassius with a shiv and gets injured himself.
11	11	"Closing Statement"	Darnell Martin	Karen Struck	April 28, 2020	2.19
Marie, Jasmine and Darius get information about Wallace’s condition from Safiya. Safiya learns the truth about the riot from Wallace and the police believes Captain Foster to be the catalyst for what happened after viewing the video footage. The next morning when the prison is in lockdown, Aaron manages to relay the message to Henry about his predicament and obtains 24-hour continuance for his case. Maskins learns about the riot and starts to spin this in his favour. He replaces Safiya with Cyrus again and this immediately causes problems for Wallace. Unfortunately, Wallace hits another roadblock as he’s forced into solitary again. Meanwhile, Captain Foster kills himself when he realizes he faces jailtime. Huey and Safiya discover the true story and with papers incriminating Maskins and Tom for their part in the Dawkins' prison transfer, she also manages to get Wallace back into court and demands a replacement for Cyrus.
12	12	"Character and Fitness"	Debs Paterson	Lee Edward Colston II	May 5, 2020	2.17
In a flashback, Wallace is found guilty, and when he arrives in prison gets beaten up for refusing to join a gang. After 27 days, his time in solitary is over, after he protected his cellmate. In court, he represents himself while Henry is the judge. Aaron impresses him so much that he drops the charges. After 986 days in prison, Wallace's lawyer refuses to keep representing him. Aaron starts learning law with Henry's help. In the end, he gets the inmates to write letters, this helps get the warden replaced.
13	13	"Fathers"	Hank Steinberg	Hank Steinberg	May 12, 2020	2.82
Wallace has his day in court in front of a new judge, Reginald Cummings, a man conciliatory to Maskins in the beginning; however, he agrees to let Wallace call his witnesses. At this point, Maskins makes his move and releases the surveillance of the prison riot to the press. Back in court, the judge bars the two witnesses used to prove racial bias by Wallace but surprisingly allows another witness: Lexi Richardson. Lexi's father mentions how she overdosed and phoned Maskins to help her and admits that he had made donations to Maskins, and this constitutes a violation of power. After he speaks with Maskins alone, the judge tells them he will decide what to do and adjourns the court. Upon leaving, Jasmine gives birth 5 weeks early. Anya, Safiya's wife, loses the election and she blames Safiya. In the morning, Wallace receives the judge's verdict and receives a retrial. Maskins visits Aaron and informs him that he is the new Attorney General and tells Wallace to drop out of the retrial in exchange for getting out within 6 months and a transfer out of Bellmore.

=== Season 2 (2020–21) ===
No. overall	No. in season	Title	Directed by	Written by	Original release date	U.S. viewers (millions)
14	1	"Never Stop Fighting"	Russell Fine	Hank Steinberg	November 18, 2020	1.96
Moments after Maskins' offer, Wallace is conflicted over what to do and seriously considering accepting the deal. However, his wife reminds him that he is innocent, and if he takes their deal, all of his fighting will have been in vain. When the day arrives, Dez puts the contract in front of him and Aaron, with Henry by his side, is ready to sign. But an intervention by Cyrus antagonizes him and he changes his mind and takes more days to think about it. Meanwhile, Safiya does her best to help Aaron and send a USB with the security footage to him as crucial evidence. Maskins, worried about that, calls Cyrus to delete the images. Just before the retrial, Wallace makes a video with Marie for Mikey pleading for help in prison. Jamal requests a meeting and is beaten by other inmates to pay back his debt. Attorney General Burke learns about the footage and a video confession by Mikey and gets Maskins to face a grand jury. In the end, Maskins resigns from his position for good, and Wallace is finally free to go.
15	2	"Homecoming"	Russell Fine	Hank Steinberg	November 25, 2020	2.14
Now free, Wallace goes back home with his wife and meets his daughter, Ronnie and his newborn grandson. On the first day at the job, Aaron follows Jamal's and his sister Georgia's case, but despite being freed, Wallace is assigned probation officer Williams to watch him every day. Elsewhere, Marie struggles to connect with her husband, and at the same time, Spencer Richardson offers Aaron a very good job. Initially he refused, but for the amount of money he's offering, Aaron isn't in a position to refuse. Despite the numerous restrictions, Wallace persists to help Georgia. With the help of Marie, he tracks down a program that can help abuse victims, and serving as Georgia's lawyer, he manages to get her home despite the fact that she was hesitant. In the morning, Wallace makes his decision – he meets Richardson and accepts his offer.
16	3	"The Necessity Defense"	Marisol Adler	Hank Steinberg	December 2, 2020	1.95
Aaron enjoys his life at home, and when he shows up with Jazz to work, they meet Charlotte, an enthusiastic woman that becomes a member of their team. Then, he and Henry head into prison to talk to their client Alice Martin. Alice's son Josh waited 6 hours for care at Westchester Hospital and brandished a gun to get attention. Meanwhile, Aaron and Jazz go out for lunch and the signs of Wallace's PTSD continue to emerge. In front of the judge, Aaron uses the 'Necessity Defence', and it turns out that the hospital was tried for racial bias in the past. Those things seem to work to collect new evidence. Williams continues to press Aaron, his family and his co-workers, and when he shows up at court, he listens as Wallace impresses the jury. At the end, Westchester DA offers a deal to Alice. Richardson is not sure to take the offer, but Aaron takes Alice and her family aside and using his own experience suggests the better thing to do is to accept the deal. Alice, with teary eyes, decides to take it. Back home, Wallace speaks to Marie about the past and his things that she packed in a storage.
17	4	"Time To Move Forward"	Russell Fine	Kirk A. Moore	December 9, 2020	2.12
Wallace is out running while thinking about Darius. When he arrives home, Jamal calls, thanking him for helping his sister and wants help for Davit's cousin, Benjamin Terzian, who had been jailed for witness tempering and is important for his own sake in the prison. Marie and his probation officer have concerns, but Aaron speaks with his client and learns that he tried to keep a friend named Giovanni out of trouble after a brawl. Back home, Aaron's parents return and his mother hugs him, but everyone remains wary because she hasn’t shown her face to Aaron for nearly 10 years. Meanwhile, next day, Aaron feels pain for the relationship with Marie. Then Ben's case becomes more difficult, but at Thanksgiving dinner, Barbara, Aaron's mother, confronts him and asks forgiveness for the past. When he speaks to Monica, a witness, it turns out Giovanni was the one who actually threatened and paid her off and Aaron resolves the case. Wallace confronts Darius who apologizes and admits he made the first move, after that he speaks with Marie about what happened, and he moves to his office.
18	5	"Collars for Dollars"	Jono Oliver	Terri Kopp	December 16, 2020	2.26
At Belmont, Aaron talks with Jamal and decides to use Jamal's past trauma for his case, but he need Georgia's testimony. After that, he speaks with Jamal's sister and learns about beatings from their father because he is gay. In the meantime, Henry receives a woman named Paola claiming aggressive behaviour from the police and mentioned to his colleagues a scheme cops called “collars for dollars”, police officers that make arrests right at the end of their shift so they can make bank in overtime. This case brings back a lot of demons for Henry; so, Aaron takes his place and gets 48 hours to prove this scheme. Because of helping Georgia, Aaron breaks his curfew and Williams takes Wallace away in handcuffs before the trial. Henry gets back on the case and interviews Liam, an ex-cop he met in his rehab class earlier. Wallace heads back to see Jamal and asks him if he wants to fight, and Jamal goes away after telling Wallace to get his own house in order. At night, he returns home and decides to spend Christmas with Marie and Jazz.
19	6	"354"	Russell Fine	Garen Thomas	January 27, 2021	1.53
The COVID-19 pandemic spread around the world and this is seen in the relationship between Aaron and Marie because of her job as a nurse. Wallace wants to speak with Jamal, but Bellmore is in quarantine and the request is denied. Wallace reaches out for help to Safiya, who talks with the prison board but when Jamal was forcibly removed from his cell. Safiya takes the case to the judge. When Aaron and Safiya meet Jamal inside the prison, the inmate in front of them throws a piece of paper on the ground for Wallace with a note "Xavier Barnwell died of COVID inside the prison". After that, O'Reilly discusses with the two the release of the prisoners and prepares to release 132 men from Bellmore if they'll cooperate. But before they decide, they speak with Hassan and learn about the condition of the other inmates. Aaron and Safiya check the CCTV footage, and they discover the sick inmates being kept in solitary and three guards covering up Xavier's death. In the end, Safiya takes charge of the situation, and O'Reilly budges his initial 7.5% to 15% and they release 354 prisoners and send them home.
20	7	"Say His Name"	Eif Rivera	Sonay Hoffman	February 3, 2021	1.41
A man named Andy Josiah and his son Marcel were out shopping, but when they return home police sirens and flashes of red and blue appear in the rear-view mirror of their car and this changes their life forever. At home, Aaron is uncomfortable with the idea of Jasmine baptizing her baby and this causes a rift to grow between the two. Jazz is shocked by the murder of George Floyd and she and Ronnie get involved in the protests neglecting their baby. Next day at work, Aaron receives the case of Andy Josiah that was shot by the police and is paralyzed. Aaron and the team call Craig Salkin and ask for his help but he can't do anything, but Henry finds a judge in Staten Island that could help. At court, Aaron fights to release Andy's handcuffs but he's interrupted by Jasmine calling as Ronnie has been arrested during a protest, but Safiya manages to help Ronnie go free. Back home, Wallace talks to Marie telling her she can lean on her family. Wallace then receives a call confirming Andy is on life support. Next day, Wallace and Henry see Alan Burke and ask him to help get an impartial and fair case for Andy, but at first, he is not very interested. When Wallace convinces Andy’s wife Elaine to go on the news and call out Burke personally to look into this case, he heads up to see Richardson and suggests him to appoint Aaron Wallace to the case as a special prosecutor. In the end, AJ's baptism and Andy's funeral happen at the same time.
21	8	"For the People"	Jono Oliver	David Feige	February 10, 2021	1.50
Alan Burke announces publicly that Aaron Wallace is the new special prosecutor and the personal lawyer of the Josiah family. Aaron asks for Safiya's help, and together they investigate at the minimarket where Andy was killed; but the owner Sherwin said that the night was quiet because of the virus and his cameras are broken. After that, Henry brings bad news again when an image of Andy with an old friend that was involved in home invasion burglary spreads online. Aaron and Safiya turn to Marcel to hear his statement and learn that police asked Andy to stop the car and that the phone story was a lie. Moments later, Sherwin heads over to Elaine's house to hand back Marcel's toy, and Safiya runs to him asking the store owner to tell the truth about the cameras. Henry suggests going conservative for a change and asks for a Grand Jury and to pile on the charges. For that, he makes a backroom deal with the judge, and after telling the judge they’ll go for a lower charge, the judge drops the case. Elaine does not understand and goes irate, slapping Wallace in the face and causing online opinion that he is a sellout. In the meantime, Ronnie confronts the police officer that arrested him before. In court, a new prosecutor Veronica Marshall makes things more difficult. Wallace decides to incriminate the police much more than before; however, Marshall knows his story and uses that against him. Nevertheless, Judge Howell agreed with this change of events. In the end, Safiya is horrified to learn Sherwin is being arrested by police.
22	9	"The Blue Wall"	Laura Belsey	T. Zhang & Jake Gillman	February 17, 2021	1.52
Aaron and his team get the video of Andy Josiah’s murder. The police mislead Sherwin and arrest him for selling alcohol to a minor and he can lose his liquor license, which helps support the family. Aaron, Safiya and Henry use the video to get Officer Matranga, who returned to his cruiser to run Andy’s ID that night. Instead, Officer Lindsey, the man who shot and has a history of being violence towards minorities while his lieutenant covered for him. Consequently, the team wanted to go after both Lindsey and Lieutenant Marco Diaz. To do this, they offer full immunity if he turned on his men. The police pressure on Aaron is very high and causes trouble with his probation officer for breaking curfew at midnight. After that, Aaron doubled his efforts on the case and this time recorded Marcel’s testimony to show to Matranga in their second meeting. The team needs a video inside the market the night before he was arrested, and Safiya advised Sherwin to visit his brother in Iran for a few weeks in exchange for the footage. Roswell tries to work out a deal for Lindsey, but Aaron refused to accept it because he believes Lindsey deserved to go to jail for much longer than one year. In the end, Aaron was also under public pressure and people were spray painting "Blue Lives Matter" on his house, while Marie was washing it off after she told him that she was staying by his side.
23	10	"Andy Josiah"	Russell Fine	Hank Steinberg & Sonay Hoffman	February 24, 2021	1.76
Aaron Wallace starts the most difficult case of his career and begins with a passioned opening statement and a video of Andy and Marcel having a good time. After that, Officer Matranga is on the stand and admits Diaz changed the report, but unexpectedly Veronica Marshall shows the messages Safiya sent to Sherwin to leave for Iran and throws out the video footage. She then discredits Matranga completely. After this horrific beginning, Henry suggests they leak the video to the press, but Aaron disagrees and walks away. Henry follows him to talk, and a man shows up with a gun, shouts "blue lives matter" and shoots Henry who protected Aaron with his body. The trial is postponed. At court again, Wallace is forced to allow Marcel to testify, and that night Williams admits that he's an inspiration to his son. When the trial is finished, he suggests Aaron be taken off probation. At court again, Marco Diaz takes the stand next, and Safiya pressed him with a footage inside the market talking to the owner. When she demonstrates that he receives a USB stick, probably with the footage that proves what really happened, the officer decides to plead the Fifth. The court case is wrapped up with closing statements from both Marshall and Wallace. After six days of deliberation, the jury proclaimed Lindsey guilty for criminally negligent homicide. By then, Elaine had given her own impassioned speech and read a letter by Andy for his son Marcel. At this point, the Judge decides to put Lindsey in prison for four years. Wallace finally enjoys his family and visits Henry in the hospital. In the end, he speaks with Jamal and promises that he will fight and get him out. When they finished the chat, Jamal rings Cassius who reminds him that they have unfinished business.

== Production ==
=== Development ===
On October 11, 2018, Deadline Hollywood reported that the then-unnamed series was under development at ABC. The pilot was written by Hank Steinberg, who was also set to executive produce alongside Alison Greenspan, Curtis "50 Cent" Jackson, Doug Robinson, Isaac Wright Jr., and George Tillman Jr. Production companies involved with the pilot included G-Unit Film & Television, Doug Robinson Productions, ABC Studios and Sony Pictures Television. On February 8, 2019, Deadline reported that the production had officially received a pilot order. In May 2019, ABC announced that they had ordered the pilot to series, now titled For Life, and that it would premiere as a mid-season replacement during the 2019–20 television season. On November 21, 2019, TVLine posted an exclusive series trailer and announced a premiere date of February 11, 2020. On June 15, 2020, ABC renewed the series for a second season which premiered on November 18, 2020. On May 14, 2021, ABC canceled the series after two seasons, but is expected to offer it to other networks. IMDb TV licensed the first two seasons and was touted as a possible home for a third season. In August 2021, IMDb TV opted to not pick up the series for a third season.

=== Casting ===
In March 2019, it was announced that Nicholas Pinnock, Indira Varma, Joy Bryant, Mary Stuart Masterson, Boris McGiver, Tyla Harris, and Dorian Missick had joined the cast in the pilot's lead roles.

=== Filming ===
On August 31, 2020, it was reported the second season had commenced production in New York City. However, on September 11, 2020, it was reported that the second season would suspend production for the day due to the COVID-19 test delays. Two days later, the suspension was extended by two weeks. Filming resumed at the end of the month.

== Reception ==
=== Critical response ===
On the review aggregator website Rotten Tomatoes, the series holds an 86% approval rating based on 14 reviews, with an average rating of 7.12/10. The site's critics consensus reads: "Guided by Nicholas Pinnock's powerful performance, For Life eschews procedural pitfalls with a sturdy, empathetic script and an impressive ensemble to bring it to life." On Metacritic, the series has a weighted average score of 64 out of 100, based on 10 critics, indicating "generally favorable reviews".

=== Ratings ===
==== Overall ====
Viewership and ratings per season of For Life
Season	Timeslot (ET)	Episodes	First aired		Last aired		TV season	Viewership rank	Avg. viewers (millions)
Season	Timeslot (ET)	Episodes	Date	Viewers (millions)	Date	Viewers (millions)	TV season	Viewership rank	Avg. viewers (millions)
1	Tuesday 10:00 p.m.	13	February 11, 2020	3.15	May 12, 2020	2.82	2019–20	77	4.36
2	Wednesday 10:00 p.m.	10	November 18, 2020	1.96	February 24, 2021	1.76	2020–21	97	3.20

==== Season 1 ====
Viewership and ratings per episode of For Life
No.	Title	Air date	Rating (18–49)	Viewers (millions)	DVR (18–49)	DVR viewers (millions)	Total (18–49)	Total viewers (millions)
1	"Pilot"	February 11, 2020	0.7	3.15	0.6	2.33	1.3	5.48
2	"Promises"	February 18, 2020	0.6	2.58	0.7	2.52	1.3	5.10
3	"Brother's Keeper"	February 25, 2020	0.6	2.50	0.5	2.14	1.1	4.65
4	"Marie"	March 10, 2020	0.6	2.60	0.6	2.09	1.2	4.70
5	"Witness"	March 17, 2020	0.6	2.35	0.5	1.95	1.1	4.30
6	"Burner"	March 24, 2020	0.6	2.38	0.5	1.88	1.1	4.26
7	"Do Us Part"	March 31, 2020	0.6	2.37	0.4	1.72	1.0	4.09
8	"Daylight"	April 7, 2020	0.6	2.33	0.5	1.83	1.1	4.16
9	"Buried"	April 14, 2020	0.5	2.18	0.5	1.84	1.0	4.02
10	"Character and Fitness"	April 21, 2020	0.4	2.18	0.6	1.75	1.0	3.90
11	"Switzerland"	April 28, 2020	0.5	2.19	0.4	1.62	0.9	3.81
12	"Closing Statement"	May 5, 2020	0.4	2.17	0.5	1.69	0.9	3.86
13	"Fathers"	May 12, 2020	0.5	2.82	0.5	1.59	1.0	4.41

==== Season 2 ====
Viewership and ratings per episode of For Life
No.	Title	Air date	Rating (18–49)	Viewers (millions)	DVR (18–49)	DVR viewers (millions)	Total (18–49)	Total viewers (millions)
1	"Never Stop Fighting"	November 18, 2020	0.4	1.96	0.4	1.60	0.8	3.56
2	"Homecoming"	November 25, 2020	0.5	2.14	—N/a	—N/a	—N/a	—N/a
3	"The Necessity Defense"	December 2, 2020	0.3	1.95	0.4	1.34	0.7	3.29
4	"Time To Move Forward"	December 9, 2020	0.4	2.12	0.3	1.28	0.7	3.40
5	"Collars for Dollars"	December 16, 2020	0.4	2.26	—N/a	—N/a	—N/a	—N/a
6	"354"	January 27, 2021	0.3	1.53	—N/a	—N/a	—N/a	—N/a
7	"Say His Name"	February 3, 2021	0.3	1.41	0.2	0.96	0.5	2.36
8	"For the People"	February 10, 2021	0.3	1.50	0.3	1.37	0.6	2.87
9	"The Blue Wall"	February 17, 2021	0.3	1.52	0.3	1.33	0.6	2.85
10	"Andy Josiah"	February 24, 2021	0.3	1.76	0.4	1.31	0.7	3.07
