= St. Clare's (series) =

Series of books by Enid Blyton

- The Twins at St. Clare's (Blyton, 1941); The O'Sullivan Twins (Blyton, 1942); Summer Term at St. Clare's (Blyton, 1943); The Second Form at St. Clare's (Blyton, 1944); The Third Form at St. Clare's (Cox, 2000); Kitty at St. Clare's (Cox, 2008); Claudine at St.Clare's (Blyton, 1944); Fifth Formers of St. Clare's (Blyton, 1945); The Sixth Form at St. Clare's (Cox, 2000)
- Author: Enid Blyton and Pamela Cox
- Cover artist: David Roberts
- Country: United Kingdom
- Language: English
- Genre: Children's literature
- Published: 1941–1945, 2000, 2008
- No. of books: 9 (6 by Blyton, 3 by Cox)
- Website: Official website

St. Clare's is a series of nine school stories written by English children's authors Enid Blyton and Pamela Cox about an eponymous boarding school. The original series of six books by Blyton was published between 1941 and 1945. Three further books were written by ghostwriter Pamela Cox in the 2000s. The series follows the heroines Patricia "Pat" and Isabel O'Sullivan from their first year at St. Clare's.

== Characters ==
Other characters include Alison O'Sullivan (the twins' cousin who always worships the wrong people), Sadie Green (Alison's spoilt American friend who always thought about her looks and the cinema), Carlotta Brown (an ex-circus girl), Kitty Flaherty (who brings her pet goat, McGinty, to the school), French sisters Claudine and Antoinette, Felicity Ray (a musical genius), Winifred James (the head girl when Pat and Isabel were in the first form), Belinda Towers (the games captain when Pat and Isabel were in the first form), Tessie (the head girl of the second form), Margery Fenworthy (who got expelled from six schools but made a fresh start at St. Clare's), Lucy Oriell (an excellent artist), Erica (a spiteful girl who played nasty tricks on Pat), Priscilla Parsons (a sixth-former who is expelled) and Joan Terry (who was bullied by Priscilla).

The teachers are:

- Miss Roberts (the first-form teacher)
- Miss Jenks (the second-form teacher)
- Miss Adams (the third-form teacher)
- Miss Ellis (the fourth-form teacher)
- Miss Cornwallis (the fifth-form teacher)
- Miss Harry (the sixth-form teacher)
- Miss Kennedy (a substitute teacher who took over as history teacher for a term in The Twins at St. Clare's)
- Miss Lewis (the usual history teacher who was ill for a term)
- Miss Wilton (the games teacher)
- Miss Quentin (a drama teacher)
- Miss Willcox (the pretentious temporary English teacher)
- Miss Walker (an art teacher)
- Mam'zelle (the French mistress and the aunt of Claudine and Antoinette)
- Miss Theobald (the headmistress, who also coaches students in maths)

== Bibliography ==
=== Original series ===
Enid Blyton published the original six books of St. Clare's series from 1941 to 1945.

1. Blyton, Enid (4 July 2005) [1941], The Twins at St. Clare's, Egmont Books Ltd, ISBN 1-4052-1977-7
2. Blyton, Enid (4 July 2005) [1942], The O'Sullivan Twins, Egmont Books Ltd, ISBN 1-4052-1978-5
3. Blyton, Enid (4 July 2005) [1943], Summer Term at St. Clare's, Egmont Books Ltd, ISBN 1-4052-1979-3
4. Blyton, Enid (4 July 2005) [1944], Second Form at St. Clare's, Egmont Books Ltd, ISBN 1-4052-1981-5
5. Blyton, Enid (5 September 2005) [1944], Claudine at St. Clare's, Egmont Books Ltd, ISBN 1-4052-1983-1
6. Blyton, Enid (3 October 2005) [1945], Fifth Formers of St. Clare's, Egmont Books Ltd, ISBN 1-4052-1984-X

=== Continuation series ===
Pamela Cox published three more books in the series:

1. Third Form at St. Clare's, Egmont Books Ltd, 1 August 2005 [2000], ISBN 1-4052-1982-3
2. Sixth Form at St. Clare's, Egmont Books Ltd, 7 November 2005 [2000], ISBN 1-4052-1985-8
3. Kitty at St. Clare's, Egmont Books Ltd, 7 April 2008 [2008], ISBN 978-1-4052-3038-4

=== Dean School Omnibus Editions ===
1. Blyton, Enid (November 1991), The Twins at St Clare's: The First Three Books Complete and Unabridged, Dean, ISBN 0-603-55063-0
2. Blyton, Enid (October 1993), Back to St Clare's, Dean & Son, ISBN 0-603-55110-6

== Adaptations ==
The series was adapted into a 1991 anime television series, The Twins at St. Clare's, by Tokyo Movie Shinsha.

In German the series was named "Hanni & Nanni" and received significant changes in names, places and characteristics. Up to date 39 books have been published, with only episodes 1-4, 11 and 13 basing on Blyton's originals, Parts 19 and 20 are adapted from Pamela Cox' editions Third Form at St. Clare's and Sixth Form at St. Clare’s. Cox's third book Kitty at St Clare’s has not yet been adapted.

A German audio drama named Hanni & Nanni, produced by EUROPA. Up to 2019, 65 episodes have been published, the storyline differs from the books, especially the later episodes.

Four German films:

- Hanni & Nanni (2010)
- Hanni & Nanni 2 (2012)
- Hanni & Nanni 3 (2013)
- Hanni & Nanni 4 (2017)
