= Tides (film) =

2021 German-Swiss science fiction thriller film by Tim Fehlbaum

- Film poster
- Directed by: Tim Fehlbaum
- Screenplay by: Tim Fehlbaum; Mariko Minoguchi
- Produced by: Tim Fehlbaum; Thomas Wöbke; Philipp Trauer; Ruth Waldburger; Constanze Guttmann
- Starring: Nora Arnezeder; Sarah-Sofie Boussnina; Iain Glen; Joel Basman; Sebastian Roché; Bella Bading; Sope Dirisu; Cloé Albertine Heinrich
- Cinematography: Markus Förderer
- Edited by: Andreas Menn
- Music by: Lorenz Dangel
- Production companies: BerghausWöbke Filmproduktion; Vega Film; Constantin Film
- Distributed by: Constantin Film (Germany)
- Release dates: March 1, 2021 (Berlinale); August 26, 2021 (Germany); August 27, 2021 (North America)
- Running time: 104 min
- Countries: Germany; Switzerland
- Language: English

Tides (also known as The Colony) is a 2021 English-language science fiction thriller film directed and written by Tim Fehlbaum. The film stars Nora Arnezeder, Iain Glen, Sarah-Sofie Boussnina, and Joel Basman. Roland Emmerich is an Executive Producer on the film. Set in a future in which the Earth's elite leave the polluted planet to settle in a space colony on Kepler-209, it is about a team from Kepler who return to Earth several generations later to test whether it is suitable for human habitation. The film had its worldwide premiere at the 71st Berlin International Film Festival.

== Plot ==
After a global catastrophe nearly wipes out humanity on Earth, Earth's elites flee to a Kepler-209 space colony. A young astronaut named Blake from the Kepler colony returns to Earth with fellow astronauts Tucker and Holden. Their mission is to test whether Earth is suitable for human habitation and reproduction. Kepler-209 residents have modern technology and space travel but they have become infertile from heavy radiation there. This is the second attempt to return to Earth.

The space capsule lands roughly on a tidal flat near the Henderson Hub, a weather beacon that broadcasts telemetry data back to Kepler-209. Holden is killed, while Tucker commits suicide after a group of fertile humans, nicknamed "The Muds", fatally wounds him and captures him and Blake, and removes technology from the shuttle. Blake is imprisoned by the Muds and nearly drowns, but she is saved by a girl named Maila.

The Muds are invaded by a hostile group that kidnaps many of them. They are taken to a cargo ship that rises above the frequent floods and storms. The aggressors are led by a former Kepler-209 resident named Gibson, who is a survivor from a previous Earth mission led by Blake's father, once thought to have no survivors as its capsule was destroyed along with its communication equipment.

Blake realizes she is fertile, and she meets the children of the Muds, whom Gibson is educating. Gibson claims the Muds killed Blake's father, but Blake learns that he has been locked away because he sided with the Muds, believing that Kepler residents should never return to Earth. Gibson introduces Blake to his adoptive son and his partner - she claims that he saved her and her son from certain death. Despite the total loss of the first mission's capsule and the communication system of the second being destroyed, Blake realizes she can instead use the weather beacon to transmit her fertility data back to Kepler with the biometer as proof of survival and fertility of Keplers while on a now recovering and viable Earth. However, Blake soon discovers the girls are being held captive for Gibson's future breeding plans with male Keplers upon their full return to the planet. She sides with the Muds, attacks the guards, and releases the girls and their families.

After freeing the Muds, she goes to free her father. They notice Gibson moving toward the Henderson Hub. Blake discovers that Gibson's adoptive son Neil is actually her half-brother (after her father impregnated Neil's mother). As Neil is technically fertile due to his mother being a Mud and also biologically a Kepler, Gibson is able to use the biometer to collect his fertility data to signal back to Kepler. She tries to stop the data upload from being broadcast back to Kepler-209, but Gibson is able to transmit the data. Blake strangles and drowns Gibson, almost drowning herself, but Maila's mother rescues her and revives her. Blake and her father rejoin the Muds and Neil and they set out in a tugboat. A closing scene shows the Mud children hidden from the prior Kepler raiders fearfully watching an approach of figures through the fog, which turn out to be their kidnapped parents returning safely home.

== Locations ==
The film was filmed in Germany and Switzerland.

- The German Tidelands (the island of Neuwerk in the Wadden Sea between the Weser and Elbe estuaries) were used for coastal settings.
- Basel Switzerland was used for the Kepler community.

== Cast ==
The cast include:

- Nora Arnezeder as Louise Blake, an astronaut
  - Cloé Albertine Heinrich as Young Louise
- Iain Glen as Gibson, a Kepler astronaut from the first mission
- Sarah-Sofie Boussnina as Narvik, a mudflat inhabitant
- Joel Basman as Paling, a mudflat inhabitant who serves as Gibson's lieutenant
- Sebastian Roché as Blake, Louise's father (part of the first mission)
- Bella Bading as Maila, Narvik's daughter
- Sope Dirisu as Tucker, an astronaut from the second mission

== Release ==
On February 11, 2021, Berlinale announced that the film would have its worldwide premiere at the 71st Berlin International Film Festival in the Berlinale Special section. The film was made available on Netflix in the US on January 11, 2022.

== Reception ==
=== Critical response ===
On the review aggregator website Rotten Tomatoes, 54% of 28 critics' reviews are positive, with an average rating of 5.6/10. On Metacritic, the film has a score of 48 out of 100, based on 5 critics, indicating "mixed or average reviews".

== Accolades ==
Award	Category	Nominee(s)	Result
Neuchâtel International Fantastic Film Festival	Audience RTS Award	Tim Fehlbaum	Won
Neuchâtel International Fantastic Film Festival	Imaging The Future Award for Best Design Production	Julian R. Wagner	Won
Neuchâtel International Fantastic Film Festival	Best Feature Film	Tim Fehlbaum	Nominated
Bavarian Film Awards	Best Directing	Tim Fehlbaum	Won
Bavarian Film Awards	Best Cinematography	Markus Förderer	Won
German Film Award	Best Sound	Lars Ginzel, Frank Kruse, Markus Stemler	Nominated
German Film Award	Best Film Score	Lorenz Dangel	Won
German Film Award	Best Production Design	Julian R. Wagner	Won
German Film Award	Best Costume Design	Leonie Zykan	Nominated
German Film Award	Best Makeup	Sabine Schumann	Won
German Film Award	Best Visual Effects	Denis Behnke	Won
