= Django (TV series) =

2023 Western television series

- Genre: Western
- Created by: Leonardo Fasoli and Maddalena Ravagli
- Based on: Django by Sergio Corbucci
- Written by: Leonardo Fasoli and Maddalena Ravagli; Max Hurwitz
- Story by: Maddalena Ravagli; Francesco Cenni; Michele Pellegrini
- Directed by: Francesca Comencini; David Evans; Enrico Maria Artale
- Starring: Matthias Schoenaerts; Nicholas Pinnock; Lisa Vicari; Noomi Rapace
- Music by: Mokadelic
- Countries of origin: Italy; France
- Original language: English
- No. of seasons: 1
- No. of episodes: 10

Production
- Executive producers: Riccardo Tozzi; Olivier Bibas; Nicola Maccanico; Nils Hartmann; Sonia Rovai; Arielle Saracco; Fabrice de la Patellière
- Production location: Romania
- Production companies: Cattleya; Atlantique Productions

Original release
- Network: Sky Atlantic (Italy); Canal+ (France)
- Release: February 13 – March 13, 2023

Django is a Western television series created by Leonardo Fasoli and Maddalena Ravagli, directed by Francesca Comencini and co-produced by Sky Atlantic and Canal+. It is an English-language reimagining of the 1966 Italian film of the same name by Sergio Corbucci. The series, consisting of ten episodes, premiered on Canal+ in France on February 13, 2023, Sky Atlantic in Italy on February 17, 2023, and Sky Atlantic in the UK on March 1, 2023.

== Premise ==
The series takes place in the Old West of the 1860s–1870s. Django finds his way to New Babylon, a city founded by John Ellis, where all manner of outcasts are welcome regardless of their background or beliefs. Eight years earlier, Django's family was murdered, but he believes that his daughter Sarah survived and has been searching for her ever since. Django finds her in New Babylon, but she is about to marry Ellis. However, Sarah does not want Django to remain in town, fearing that trouble will follow him. Django is determined not to leave her again, and reconnect with his daughter.

== Cast and characters ==
=== Main ===
- Matthias Schoenaerts as Julian Wright / Django, a man searching for his daughter, Sarah, after the rest of their family was murdered.
- Nicholas Pinnock as John Ellis, the founder of New Babylon, a welcoming city to outcasts of any background. Cache Vanderpuye portrays young John during flashback scenes.
- Lisa Vicari as Sarah Wright, Django's long lost daughter, set to marry John Ellis. Maya Kelly portrays Sarah during flashback scenes.
- Noomi Rapace as Elizabeth Thurman / The Lady, the merciless rival and former childhood friend of John Ellis. Millie Ryder portrays young Elizabeth during flashback scenes.

=== Recurring ===
- Jyuddah Jaymes as Seymour Ellis
- Benny O. Arthur as Kevin Ellis
- Eric Kole as Phillip Ellis
- Joshua J Parker as Adam Thurman
- Camille Dugay Comencini as Margaret Wright
- Tom Austen as Elijah Turner
- Emeline Lambert as Caroline Turner
- Oleksandr Rudynskyi as Spencer Forrest
- Haris Salihovic as Blaine Forrest
- Abigail Thorn as Jess
- Romario Simpson as Reuben Morgan
- Tobi Ibitoye as Harry
- Antal Edgar Miklos as Guardian
- Dakota Trancher Williams as Aaron
- Franco Nero as Reverend
- Slavko Sobin as Isaac Borowka

== Episodes ==
No.	Title	Directed by	Written by	Original release date
1	"New Babylon"	Francesca Comencini	Leonardo Fasoli & Maddalena Ravagli	February 13, 2023
2	"The Lady"	Francesca Comencini	Leonardo Fasoli & Maddalena Ravagli	February 13, 2023
3	"Nagadoches"	Francesca Comencini	Leonardo Fasoli & Maddalena Ravagli	February 20, 2023
4	"Fountainhead"	Francesca Comencini	Teleplay by : Max Hurwitz; Story by : Leonardo Fasoli & Maddalena Ravagli & Max Hurwitz	February 20, 2023
5	"Chambersburg"	David Evans	Leonardo Fasoli & Maddalena Ravagli	February 27, 2023
6	"The Trial"	David Evans	Teleplay by : Max Hurwitz; Story by : Leonardo Fasoli & Maddalena Ravagli & Max Hurwitz	February 27, 2023
7	"The Giant"	David Evans	Leonardo Fasoli & Maddalena Ravagli	March 6, 2023
8	"Tobacco Tin"	Enrico Maria Artale	Leonardo Fasoli & Maddalena Ravagli	March 6, 2023
9	"Masquerade"	Enrico Maria Artale	Leonardo Fasoli & Maddalena Ravagli	March 13, 2023
10	"The Western Sea"	Enrico Maria Artale	Leonardo Fasoli & Maddalena Ravagli	March 13, 2023

== Production ==
=== Development ===
The series was announced and commissioned by Sky Italia/Sky Studios and Canal+ in April 2015 as being developed as an Italian-French co-production by Cattleya and Atlantique Productions. It was originally to consist of 12 fifty-minute-long episodes, with the potential for future seasons. Maddalena Ravagli wrote a series treatment with Francesco Cenni and Michele Pellegrini loosely based on the 1966 film Django, directed by Sergio Corbucci, and Ravagli went on to create and write the series with Leonardo Fasoli. Francesca Comencini was set to direct the first episodes of the 10-episode series and serve as the artistic director.

=== Casting ===
In February 2021, it was announced that Matthias Schoenaerts had been cast as Django. In May 2021, additional casting was announced including Noomi Rapace, Nicholas Pinnock, and Lisa Vicari, among several more.

=== Filming ===
The production worked with Bucharest-based Frame Film to coordinate filming in Romania. Initially planned to run from November 2020 to December 2021, preparations for filming actually began in February 2021. The production closed the Racoș (Alsórákos) volcano to outside visitors without advanced notice. This caused a disruption for visitors that had planned visits to the popular tourist destination, only to be turned away by posted signs warning that they could not enter or take photos of the area. Django is the largest television production in Romania, taking advantage of the country's cash rebate incentives and an early re-opening to international productions without quarantine requirements provided COVID-19 vaccinations are complete.

Set design was done by scenographer Paki Meduri, who constructed New Babylon in Racoș using construction methods from the era to create scenery resembling the Old West. The production began filming in May 2021, with filming expected to continue for over six months. Additional filming took place in Bucharest and the Danube area.

== Release ==
The first two episodes were screened at the Rome Film Festival on October 16, 2022.

The series premiered on Canal+ in France on February 13, 2023, followed by Sky Atlantic in Italy on February 17, 2023. It later was released on SBS On Demand in Australia on February 23, 2023 and on Sky Atlantic in the UK on March 1, 2023.

== Reception ==
Reviewing the show for The Guardian, Rebecca Nicholson called it a gruesome and preposterous Western. Ralph Jones was critical of the series reviewing for NME, saying that it was "wobbly" and the variation of accents from actor to actor was distracting.
