= Hell (2011 film) =

2011 film

- Theatrical release poster
- Directed by: Tim Fehlbaum
- Written by: Tim Fehlbaum; Oliver Kahl; Thomas Woebke
- Produced by: Gabriele Walther; Thomas Wöbke
- Starring: Hannah Herzsprung
- Cinematography: Markus Förderer; Tim Fehlbaum
- Edited by: Andreas Menn
- Music by: Lorenz Dangel
- Production companies: Caligari Film und Fernsehproduktions GmbH; Vega Film AG; SevenPictures Film
- Distributed by: Paramount Pictures
- Release date: 22 September 2011
- Running time: 89 minutes
- Countries: Germany; Switzerland
- Language: German

Hell is a 2011 German-Swiss post-apocalyptic film directed by Tim Fehlbaum in his directorial debut. The German-language screenplay was written by Fehlbaum, Oliver Kahl and Thomas Woebke. The filmmaker Roland Emmerich acted as executive producer, with Gabriele Walther and Wöbke acting as producers.

The film is about a young woman named Marie (Hannah Herzsprung), her boyfriend Phillip (Lars Eidinger) and her younger sister Leonie (Lisa Vicari) who are driving through the blighted wasteland of Germany after a climate crisis has destroyed society. Parched by thirst, the trio scavenge for water, gas and supplies. The trio are joined by a male survivor, Tom (Stipe Erceg), who they encounter in the ruins. Later, after the group is ambushed by carjackers who abduct Leonie and take the vehicle, all of the group end up being captured by a farming family who hold survivors in the farm's former slaughterhouse to use them as a source of food.

== Plot ==
The film tells the story of a small group of survivors in post-apocalyptic Germany in the year 2016. Solar flares have destroyed the Earth's atmosphere, and global temperatures have risen by ten degrees Celsius. The sunlight is so hot that traveling outside during daylight hours is dangerous. Crops have failed, little water or food is available, and social order is broken. The film tells the story of a young woman named Marie, her younger sister Leonie, and Phillip, a young man who is also romantically connected with Marie. The trio travels through the dry wasteland in a Volvo station wagon with metal mesh on the windows. To avoid the Sun's harsh rays, newspaper and cardboard have been taped over the inside of the windows, except for a narrow strip for the driver to see. They are heading for the mountains, where rumor has it that water can still be found. They scavenge wrecked cars and gas stations for extra gas, water (from heating pipes and toilets), and food, always alert for hostile survivors who might attack them.

When the trio finds a ruined gas station, Phillip tries to obtain gasoline from the station's underground tanks and abandoned vehicles while the women scavenge for supplies in the buildings. While the trio are working away, a hooded man steals food and water from their car and then holds Leonie as a hostage. After Phillip and the attacker fight and the aggressor is subdued, they agree to a truce of sorts. The attacker, Tom, tells them he is a mechanic. Phillip agrees to bring Tom along as a passenger in the car, on their search for water, if Tom will repair the heat-damaged engine. The quartet drive along through the roads towards the mountains until they stop due to a huge metal structure that is blocking the roadway. The group work together to move the blockage and then three of the group climb down a hill to look at a wrecked car for items to scavenge, leaving Leonie in the car alone.

Suddenly, the group hear Leonie's screams, and they realize the blocked road was a trap. Leonie is abducted by carjackers. Although the others try to help her, it is too late. When the trio of remaining survivors reunite in the woods, Tom convinces them to try to free Leonie. Tom spots smoke in the distance and encourages the group to investigate. The smoke is coming from a large fire at a survivors' encampment, where Leonie and other hostages are kept chained up. Tom convinces Marie and Phillip, who are both terrified of the abductors, that they should throw a Molotov cocktail to create a diversion so that Marie can take the car back and rescue Leonie. The rescue attempt misfires; Marie manages to get the car started and escape with Phillip, but Phillip could not break Leonie's chains so the pair leave without her; moreover, Phillip's foot is badly injured during the escape after fighting off one of the abductors. Phillip encourages Marie to consider Leonie a lost cause, but Marie insists on trying to rescue her. Marie leaves alone to search for Leonie. Marie falls asleep in a ruined church, and is awakened by a middle-aged woman named Elisabeth. Elisabeth offers Marie water and invites her to come to her family farm as a guest.

Marie sleeps in Elisabeth's barn, only to awake to find herself locked in. Peering out the slats of the barn, she sees what looks like abducted captives being led about. Elisabeth opens the locked door and tells Marie that Phillip will be used like livestock, in the absence of other food and that Marie and Leonie will be forced to marry the sons of the farmers. When Elisabeth's son Micha opens the door, Marie engages in kissing with him, but then strikes him with a large piece of wood. Injured, Micha tries to choke her, but then Leonie smashes a heavy object on him, knocking him out. Leonie escapes from the barn and hides in the woods, but Marie is bound and put in the slaughterhouse after refusing to eat human flesh during dinner. Marie witnesses Phillip's execution, but manages to cut her ziplock cuffs and escape. She opens a locked door in the barn, where she finds many captives, including Tom. The captives flee from the farm, with the family in pursuit. Tom fights with and dispatches several of the farmers. Marie manages to escape and runs through the woods in search of Leonie. When she finds her, Leonie is being bound by one of Elisabeth's adult sons. Elisabeth confronts Marie, who kills her with a captive bolt pistol she stole from the slaughterhouse. While the adult son mourns Elisabeth, Marie releases Leonie. The two sisters and Tom flee to the mountains, where they find water. Up in the sky, they see birds. Looking over the ridge at a chain of hills in hope of a better fate there, they can see nothing but even more blighted wasteland down in the valley.

== Cast ==
- Hannah Herzsprung as Marie
- Stipe Erceg as Tom
- Angela Winkler as Elisabeth, The Farmer
- Michael Kranz as Micha (voice)
- Yoann Blanc as Micha
- Lars Eidinger as Phillip
- Lisa Vicari as Leonie
- Anne Hartung as Sophia
- Lilo Baur as Frenchwoman
- Marco Calamandrei as Frenchman
- Ellen Schweiger as Grandma
- Christoph Gaugler as Brückner, The Farmer

== Release ==
Hell opened in September 2011 in Germany. On 10 July 2012, it was released on video-on-demand, and on 21 August 2012, it was released on DVD.

== Reception ==
Jay Weissberg of Variety described it as "a tightly crafted post-apocalyptic survival tale that makes up in conviction what it lacks in originality." Karsten Kastelan of The Hollywood Reporter wrote, "And while this Swiss-German co-production's straightforward storytelling and white-knuckle suspense are commendable, its success will in large part depend on how much agony and human deceit audiences are willing to take." Paul Mount of Starburst rated it 7/10 stars and wrote that though it lacks originality, it is a "stark and powerful film". Dan Geary of Total Film rated it 1/5 stars and criticized the cinematography. Mike Ferraro of Bloody Disgusting rated it 3.5/5 stars and wrote, "Hell does a great job of creating atmosphere and suspense. Sure, most of these things we have seen before, but the performances here really help guide it through the clichés in a captivating fashion." Scott Weinberg of Fearnet wrote, "what Hell lacks in originality, it makes up for in gritty intensity, strong performances, and a visual presentation that’s both a workout for the eyeballs, but also strangely beautiful to look at." Gerard Iribe rated it 3.5/5 stars and called it "a very decent picture" that should have had more science fiction elements. David Johnson of DVD Verdict called it "slick and tense in moments" but ultimately too derivative.

== Accolades ==
The film won the award for Best Film at Fantasporto. At the German Academy Awards, it won the award for Best Film Music and was nominated for Best Film. At Sitges Film Festival, it won Best Cinematography and Special Mention.
