= Dennis Mojen =

German actor (born 1993)

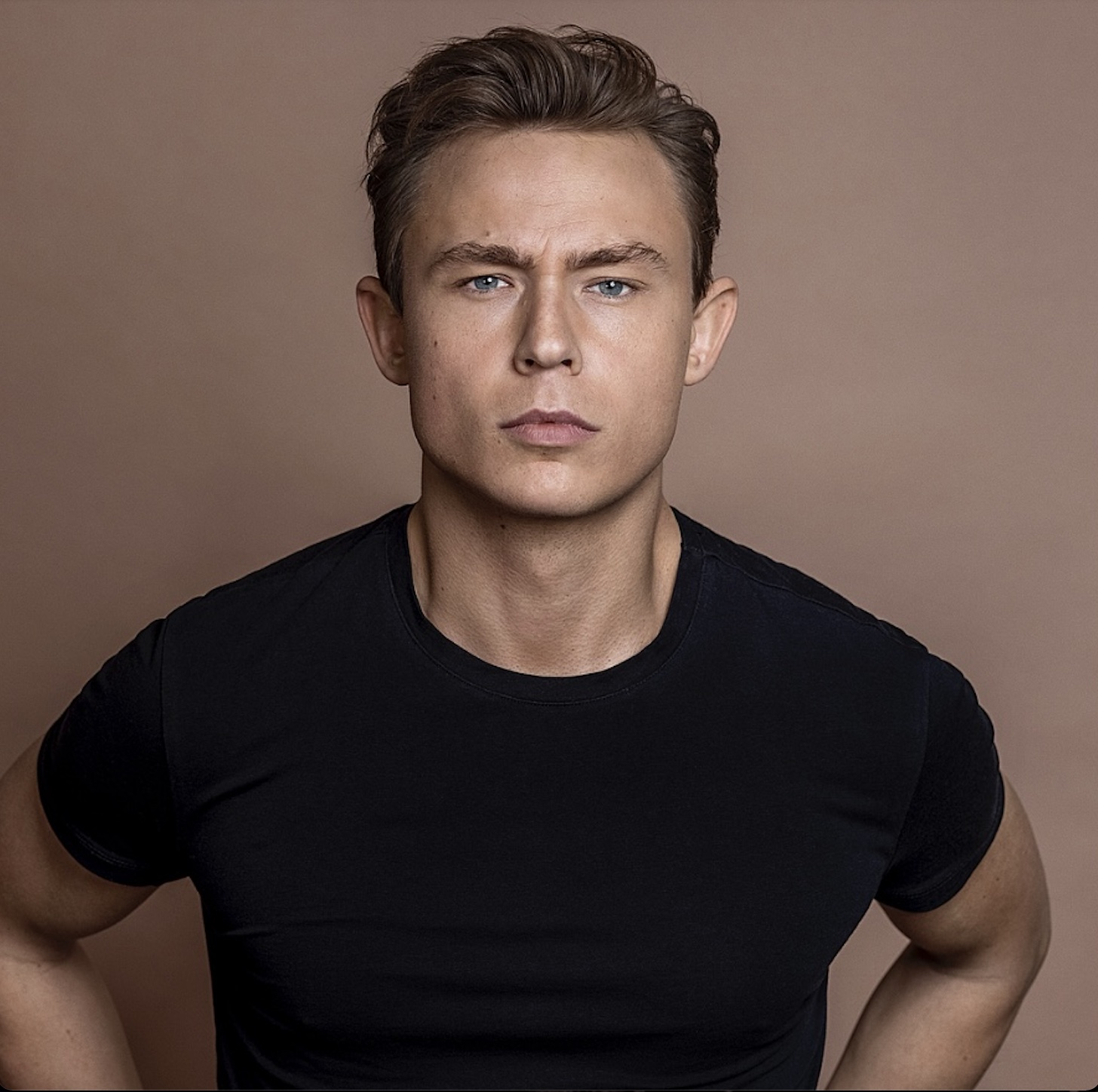
- Born: 1993; Hamburg
- Citizenship: German
- Occupation: Actor
- Years active: 2009-present
- Known for: Isi & Ossi
- Height: 185 cm (6 ft 1 in)

Dennis Mojen (born 1993 in Hamburg) is a German actor.

== Career ==
Mojen, who wanted to be an actor since childhood, grew up in Hamburg. His father is a professor at the Film Academy Baden-Württemberg in Ludwigsburg, and his mother worked in the film industry for a time.

He has been in front of the camera since he was a teenager. He first appeared on television as Lenny in Notruf Hafenkante. In 2009 he took part in the children's and youth series Die Pfefferkörner. That year Mojen had a supporting role in the coming-of-age film Summertime Blues.

In 2010, Mojen graduated from an Acting Master Class in Los Angeles. In 2011 he played the gunman Tom in Der Ausflug, a 16-year-old academically overwhelmed student who is suspected of being an arsonist in Notruf Hafenkante, a teenager who is suspected of having robbed a kiosk in Großstadtrevier and the television film Annas Erbe alongside Jutta Speidel and Anna Hausburg.

In Der Dicke (2012) he played a student who bullies a teacher with private videos that he posts on the Internet. The following year he had a role in Arnes Nachlass, a literary adaptation of a story by Siegfried Lenz, where he portrayed the eldest son Hans alongside Jan Fedder. In 2013 he also appeared as an actor in the music video for the song Aschenflug by the German pop singer Adel Tawil. In 2014 he was the friend of a transplant patient suffering from chronic bronchitis in In aller Freundschaft, and a mountain climber in Der Bergdoktor.

In early 2015, he played a leading role in the series Unter Gaunern, in which he portrayed "Chef Coolio," the leader of a street gang. Followed in February 2015 by a leading role in the series Großstadtrevier, this time as a Hamburg police cadet who becomes entangled in neo-Nazi circles. In April he starred in Tatort's episode "Der Himmel ist ein Platz auf Erden", for which he received the New Faces Award. In the television film Die Neue, Mojen alongside Iris Berben and Ava Celik.

In 2017 he was the son of a murdered football coach in Leipzig Homicide. In the ARD crime series Nord bei Nordwest (2018) he played the role of Lukas Benedikt, in the episode Waidmannsheil, a young man who tries to protect his two younger sisters from their father's sexual assaults. In the same year he starred in Polizeiruf 110: Crash, Mojen played one of the main roles as Tommy Otto, a parcel delivery man who makes a living by stealing cars and dealing drugs and who participates in illegal car races as a member of a group of racers who call themselves “Le Magdeburg.” In the ZDF ensemble film Extraklasse he was Mike a petty criminal youth. In SOKO München as a young man suffering from hebephrenic schizophrenia who was kidnapped as a child, and in Letzte Spur Berlin as macho professional firefighter Enrico Wolf who bullies his new colleague.

He played the young Berlin medical student Danny, who is in love with the medical student daughter of Lotta's boss (Kirsten Block) in the 7th film of the Lotta film series of ZDF, Lotta & der schöne Schein in 2019. Subsequently he was Michi Sievers, the black sheep son of a building contractor, in the television series Der Usedom-Krimi. Then Mojen played one of the leading roles as the young East German soldier and con man Emil Hellberg, who poses as a film producer in order to be able to see his French lover again, in the film Traumfabrik.

In 2020, he starred as aspiring boxer Ossi in the Netflix romantic comedy film Isi & Ossi.

== Partial filmography ==
=== Films ===
- 2009: Summertime Blues
- 2010: The Poll Diaries
- 2016: Nirgendwo
- 2016: UFO: It Is Here
- 2019: Traumfabrik

=== Short films ===
- 2013: Am Ende Licht
- 2014: Der Ausflug

=== TV films ===
- 2011: Isenhart: The Hunt Is on for Your Soul
- 2011: Anna Erbe
- 2013: Arnes Nachlass
- 2015: Tatort: Der Himmel ist ein Platz auf Erden
- 2015: Die Neue
- 2016: Fanny und die gestohlene Frau
- 2016: Fanny und die geheimen Väter
- 2017: Brüder
- 2018: Nord bei Nordwest – Waidmannsheil (TV series)
- 2018: Wach
- 2018: Polizeiruf 110: Crash
- 2018: Extraklasse
- 2019: Lotta & der schöne Schein
- 2019: Träume – Der Usedom-Krimi
- 2019 Traumfabrik
- 2020: Isi & Ossi (Netflix film)

=== TV series ===
- 2009: Die Pfefferkörner (Episode: Kirchenklau)
- 2011: Notruf Hafenkante (Episode: Alles Einstein)
- 2011: Großstadtrevier (Episode: Frohe Weihnachten, Dirk Matthies)
- 2012: Der Dicke (Episode: Späte Reue)
- 2012: Der Cop und der Snob (Episode: Die Clique)
- 2013: Heiter bis tödlich: Morden im Norden (Episode: Der Fingerzeig)
- 2013: Der Lehrer (2 episodes)
- 2014: Der Bergdoktor (Episode: Königskinder)
- 2014: Die Chefin (Episode: Tod eines Lehrers)
- 2014: In aller Freundschaft (Episode: Der Moment der Wahrheit)
- 2015: Unter Gaunern (Episode: Die nackte Paula)
- 2015: Großstadtrevier (Episode: Kameraden)
- 2016: Morgen hör ich auf (5 episodes)
- 2016: Cologne P.D. (Episode: Mörderisches Wochenende)
- 2017: Leipzig Homicide (Episode: Aus der Deckung)
- 2017: Alarm für Cobra 11 – Die Autobahnpolizei (Episode: Freier Fall)
- 2018: SOKO München (Episode: Machtlos)
- 2018: Letzte Spur Berlin (Episode: Lebensretterin)
- 2021: Into the Night Season 2 (Netflix)
