= Tim Fehlbaum =

Swiss film director

- Born: 1982 (age 43–44); Basel, Switzerland
- Education: University of Television and Film Munich
- Occupations: Director; producer; writer
- Years active: 2011–present

Tim Fehlbaum (born 1982) is a Swiss film director. He is known for the film September 5 (2024), for which he was nominated for the Academy Award for Best Original Screenplay.

== Career ==
Fehlbaum studied directing from 2002-2009 at the University of Television and Film Munich. While there, he made several short films, music videos and worked as camera operator on documentary films.

In 2011 Fehlbaum made his feature film debut with the bleak post-apocalyptic horror film Hell, for which he also co-wrote the screenplay. The film starred Hannah Herzsprung, Angela Winkler and Lars Eidinger in the lead roles. It has received numerous good reviews, especially for Fehlbaums ability to create a visually bright but atmospherically dark thriller with dense atmosphere. Fehlbaum won the German Cinema New Talent Award at the Munich Film Festival, where it had its world premiere and the Zurich Film Award both in the director category. In 2012 the film was nominated in six categories and won Best Music at the German Film Awards and two awards at the Swiss Film Award. It also appeared in competition at the Locarno International Film Festival and won awards at genre festivals such as the Sitges Film Festival and Fantasporto.

Fehlbaum also won the German New Faces Award in 2012 and was listet in Variety's 10 Euro directors to watch.

In 2021 Fehlbaum's science-fiction thriller film Tides premiered at the Berlin International Film Festival in the Berlinale Special section and subsequently won several awards, such as four German Film Awards, as well as two Bavarian Film Awards for Best Director and Best Cinematography. Tides won the RTS Audience Award and the Best Production Design Award at the 20th edition of the NIFFF. and Best Feature Film and Best Visual Effects at the Fancine Fantastic Film Festival in Malaga. Reviews noted Fehlbaum's flair for striking mise en scene.

In 2024, Fehlbaum co-wrote and directed September 5, a film about ABC Sports' coverage of the 1972 Munich massacre. He received several accolades, including a nomination the Academy Award for Best Original Screenplay, alongside Moritz Binder and Alex David.

== Filmography ==
Short film

Year	Title	Director	Writer
2004	Für Julian	Yes	Yes
2006	Wo ist Freddy?	Yes	No
2016	Flicker	Yes	No

Feature film

Year	Title	Director	Writer	Producer
2004	Nicht meine Hochzeit	Yes	Yes	No
2011	Hell	Yes	Yes	No
2021	Tides	Yes	Yes	Yes
2024	September 5	Yes	Yes	No

== Awards ==
- 2004: Shocking Shorts Award for For Julian
- 2011: German Cinema New Talent Award for Hell
- 2011: Zurich Film Award in the director category for Hell
- 2012: New Faces Award in the debut film category for Hell
- 2020: Bavarian Film Award in the director category for Tides

== See also ==
- List of Swiss Academy Award winners and nominees
