= Isi & Ossi =

- Official release poster
- Directed by: Oliver Kienle
- Written by: Oliver Kienle
- Produced by: Uwe Schott; Stefan Arndt; Jorgo Narjes
- Starring: Lisa Vicari; Dennis Mojen; Christina Hecke; Pegah Ferydoni
- Cinematography: Yoshi Heimrath
- Edited by: Knut Hake
- Music by: Michael Kadelbach
- Production company: X-Filme Creative Pool
- Distributed by: Netflix
- Release date: 14 February 2020 (Germany)
- Running time: 113 minutes
- Country: Germany
- Language: German

Isi & Ossi is a 2020 German romantic comedy film directed and written by Oliver Kienle and produced by Netflix, starring Dennis Mojen, Lisa Vicari, Christina Hecke and Pegah Ferydoni. It is set in Heidelberg and Mannheim, two cities in the state of Baden-Württemberg, Germany.

The story revolves around the billionaire's daughter Isabelle "Isi" Voigt and the struggling boxer Oscar "Ossi" Markowski who are each other's opposites, and initially start dating to take advantage of each other.

It was released on 14 February 2020 by Netflix.

== Plot ==
Since she was very young, Isi Voight has rebelled against her mother Claudia in her incredibly wealthy family in Heidelberg. Simultaneously, Ossi Markowski has been very inquisitive in his much poorer one in Mannheim. Spending most of her time with the cooking staff, Isi neglected her studies so graduated from high school two years late, Ossi rebelled against the chaos of public school so his aggression was channeled into boxing.

Isi dreams of becoming a chef and attending culinary school in New York, but her parents want her to attend university. Meanwhile, Ossi trains to become a professional boxer, but his mother's debt causes him to have frequent absences from training so jeopardize his career. He loses his sponsor so has to come up with the 8,000 euros entrance fee. Isi requests access to her inheritance to fund her culinary ambitions, but her parents deny her request.

Frustrated, Isi then drives over the river to Mannheim, and applies for a job at a burger joint, where she meets Ossi. Realising her father sent Klaus to follow her, and after Ossi takes out an aggressor, she boldly gives him her number.

At home, Ossi looks Isi up online and discovers her family's wealth. His mother Betty and best friend Tschunni encourage him to pursue her, as he needs the match entrance fee and Betty owes tax money for the gas station. They get him to invite her on a date.

After a bad first date at the burger place, where she now works, Isi tags along with Ossi to pick up his grandfather from prison upon his release. They bond over their shared interests on the ride. However, Ossi admits he had only planned to scam her out of the money for his fight, as he had learned of her wealth.

When her parents cut off all access to their money, Isi angrily damages Klaus' car, then meets with Ossi. She offers to pay for Ossi's fight if he pretends to be her boyfriend. Isi takes Ossi and Tschunni to a gallery opening so they can make a scene and embarrass her parents.

They head to a hip-hop club when Ossi is warned that his grandfather is there. He jumps in on a rap battle, the video goes viral, and he lands a record deal. Before they stage foreplay for her parents to see, Isi encourages Ossi to pursue better boxing management and leave his mother's gas station behind.

After her father catches the pair making out, he comes close to hitting her, but Ossi intervenes. Isi announces she is moving in with her boyfriend, and they march out together. That evening and the next day, the pair gets to know each other further. They go out partying to celebrate his grandfather's success with him and Tschunni, Isi gets very drunk and finally is intimate with Ossi.

Isi's parents eventually grant her access to her inheritance but demand that she end her relationship with Ossi. The breakup affects both Isi and Ossi, and they part ways. They are both distracted, she at work and he at training. Isi confides in her best friend Camilla that she misses Ossi. He angrily strips his sheets, as they smell of her.

When Ossi's grandfather offers to cover the boxing fee, Ossi marches up to Isi's to return the money. They argue and trade expletives before he stomps off. Ossi gets his fire back, then widely shares a video of her extremely drunk. Isi retaliates by getting the other boxer to pull out.

After Isi's parents overhear their argument and realize the two genuinely care for each other. Claudia, Isi's mother, apologizes to her daughter and confesses that she had discouraged Isi's dream to protect her from poverty. At work, Ossi confronts Isi about her interference with the fight. A call warning him that his grandfather is flying off the handle forces them to go defuse him. Afterwards, they both promise to make amends, but Ossi does not let her kiss him.

In the end, Isi uses her inheritance to buy out the burger joint, and Ossi becomes a professional boxer with Isi's support and encouragement.

== Cast ==
- Lisa Vicari as Isabelle "Isi" Voigt
- Dennis Mojen as Oscar "Ossi" Markowski
- Walid Al-Atiyat as Tschünni, Ossi's best friend
- Christina Hecke as Claudia Voigt
- Ernst Stötzner as Grandpa
- Lisa Hagmeister as Betty Markowski, Ossi's mother
- Hans-Jochen Wagner as Manfred Voigt, Isi's father
- André Eisermann as Ossi's Coach
- Zoë Straub as Camilla, Isi's best friend
- Pegah Ferydoni as teacher

== Production ==
Isi & Ossi was shot in three locations: Berlin, Mannheim and Heidelberg. Filming took place in one month.

== Reception ==
Greg Wheeler of The Review Geek wrote: "A boy and a girl from polar opposite backgrounds come together and find love. It’s one of the oldest rom-com tropes in the book and yet every year there’s a whole wave of titles that rehash this idea and put a slightly different spin on it... Step forward German Netflix film Isi & Ossi that takes this cliched idea, intertwines two big dreams together to produce an indifferent, painting by numbers picture that does little to stand out from so many others out there." Wheeler, however, praised the performances of Vicari and Mojen and their natural chemistry.
