= Luna (2017 film) =

- Directed by: Khaled Kaissar
- Written by: Ulrike Schölles; Ali Zojaji; Alexander Costea
- Produced by: Khaled Kaissar; Thomas Wöbke; Tobias M. Huber
- Starring: Lisa Vicari; Carlo Ljubek; Branko Tomović; Benjamin Sadler
- Cinematography: Namche Okon
- Edited by: Florian Duffe
- Music by: Christoph Zirngibl; Heiko Maile
- Production companies: Kaissar Film; Rat Pack Filmproduktion
- Release date: June 29, 2017
- Running time: 92 minutes
- Country: Germany
- Languages: German, Russian

Luna (also titled Luna's Revenge and Runaway) is a 2017 German thriller film, directed by Khaled Kaissar, and starring Lisa Vicari, Carlo Ljubek, and Branko Tomović.

== Plot ==
Luna (Lisa Vicari) is an intelligent and carefree teenager who is spending the summer with her family in the mountains. Suddenly, her entire family is killed by foreign agents, and Luna just barely manages to escape. She is forced to confront the fact that her whole life has been a lie: her father Jakob (Benjamin Sadler) was a Russian agent living in Germany for 20 years, while her family was just the cover. When he was finally exposed by the BND, she found herself in the crosshairs of the Russian secret service. Luna teams up with the secretive agent Hamid (Carlo Ljubek) in order to find justice for her family. Eventually she exposes Victor (Branko Tomovic) as the murderer, and several arrests are made.

== Production ==
"Luna" was filmed in late 2015 in Munich, Dachau and Oberstdorf. Lisa Vicari performed her own stunts, including hanging on a rope at a height of 60 to 70 meters above a gorge. It is Kaissar film production, in co-production with Rat Pack and Berghaus Wöbke. The executive producer is Tobias M. Huber. The screenplay was written by Ulrike Schölles and Ali Zojaji, and the cinematography was directed by Namche Okon. It is based on a true story.

== Cast ==
- Lisa Vicari as Luna
- Carlo Ljubek as Hamid
- Branko Tomovic as Victor
- Benjamin Sadler as Jakob
- Rainer Bock as Behringer
- Genija Rykova as Kathrin
- Bibiana Beglau as Julia
- Laura Graser as Leni
- Tamara Graser as Leni
- Johannes Meier as Ludger
- Eugen Knecht as Andrej
- Roland von Kummant as a hacker
- Moritz Fischer as Piotr
- Katharina Stark as Charlie

== Release and reception ==
Luna was premiered on June 29, 2017 at the Munich Film Festival. It received wide release at German cinemas on February 15, 2018. At the 2018 International Police Film Festival in Liège, Belgium, it won the Young Jury Award.

The film received generally good reviews. Benjamin Wirtz from Filmaffe believes that the Germans can do genre cinema and Luna proves "to a large extent". Although the film is "not a perfect thriller", it is "one of the better genre films that have been created in Germany recently", which is lacking in the country anyway. The fact that the thriller offers "quite successful entertainment" is "mainly thanks to leading actress Lisa Vicari [...] who can carry the story without difficulty". Timo Wolters of Blu-Ray-Rezensions.net writes: “In any case, in his directorial debut, Khaled Kaiser delivers an absolutely thrilling thriller with an agent touch, the opening of which at a hut in the forest for German productions is groundbreakingly hard and straight to the point. [...] This is not far from Hollywood level and is at least at the level of Scandinavian thrillers." Oliver Armknecht from film-rezensionen.de was more critical, opining that the few "points of light" were "obscured by a thriller that doesn't manage to develop its own identity" and gave it 4 out of 10 points.
