= Isaac Wright Jr. =

American attorney (born 1962)

- Born: January 23, 1962 (age 64); Orlando, Florida, U.S.
- Education: Thomas Edison State University (BS); St. Thomas University (JD)
- Occupations: Lawyer, entrepreneur
- Known for: Falsely accused, convicted and sentenced to life in prison inspiration for ABC TV series For Life
- Spouse: Sunshine Wright (m. 1982; div. 1991)
- Children: 1

Isaac Wright Jr. (born January 23, 1962) is an American attorney, businessman, and philanthropist. He is best known for being falsely accused and convicted as a drug lord and sentenced to life in prison in 1991 facing 10 charges involving the sale of cocaine. His conviction was overturned in 1997 after litigation brought by him on the basis of police corruption during his investigation and the prosecutor's knowing presentation of perjured testimony at his trial. His story is depicted in the television drama/series production For Life, which premiered in 2020 on American Broadcasting Company. He was a candidate for mayor of New York City in the 2021 New York City mayoral election.

== Early life and education ==
Wright was born on January 23, 1962, in Orlando, Florida, to Isaac Wright Sr. and Sandra B. Wright. Wright’s father was a career military man and Wright lived in numerous cities in the U.S. and abroad. He attended Berkeley High School in Moncks Corner, South Carolina.

== Career ==
In the early 1980s Wright, while living in New York City along with his wife and daughter, appeared on the talent show Star Search for several weeks as a member of the dance trio Uptown Express. By the late 1980s he was a talent manager and owned an independent record label called X-Press Records while his wife, Sunshine, was a member of platinum selling group he co-founded called The Cover Girls, a pop and urban contemporary musical group.

=== Arrest and incarceration ===
In 1989, Isaac Wright Jr. was arrested and falsely charged with being the mastermind behind one of the largest drug distribution networks in the New York/New Jersey metropolitan areas. After being detained for almost two years, he was tried in 1991 and convicted under New Jersey's drug kingpin statute. He was subsequently sentenced to life in prison on the kingpin conviction and a total of 72 years on convictions for other charges.

While still serving a life sentence, Wright formulated a new theory in a supplemental defense pro se brief he submitted in another prisoner’s case, State v. Alexander, 264 N.J.Super 102 (1993). In that legal brief, Wright attacked the jury instructions used by New Jersey in kingpin cases, reasoning that the instructions were contrary to the legislature’s intent on who should be charged and convicted as a drug kingpin. Wright’s argument prevailed in Alexander and, when that decision was unsuccessfully appealed to the New Jersey Supreme Court by the State of New Jersey, Wright created new law; See Common law. Wright then used that new law in a supplemental defense pro se brief to reverse his own kingpin conviction and life sentence in State v. Wright, 143 N.J. 580 (1996). While this allowed Wright to successfully get rid of his life sentence, he remained in prison on numerous other convictions with sentences totaling over 70 years.

With his direct appeal over, Wright motioned the trial court for Post Conviction Relief (PCR), claiming police and prosecutorial misconduct in his case. At his 1996 PCR hearing, during Wright's cross-examination of a veteran police detective James Dugan, the detective confessed to police misconduct in his case. Wright’s ultimate release came as a result of that cross-examination, as Dugan’s confession opened revelations of wide and systematic police and prosecutorial misconduct and cover-up in Wright’s case.

Somerset County Prosecutor, Nicholas L. Bissell Jr., who had prosecuted Wright’s case, was identified as the orchestrator of the misconduct. Bissell directed police officers to falsify reports, while he personally dictated the false testimony of witnesses against Wright. Bissell further made secret deals with defense attorneys to have their clients lie to the jury that Wright was their drug boss and that they had pled guilty and were going to prison.

Dugan pled guilty to official misconduct in order to escape prison. Wright’s trial judge, Michael Imbriani, who further concealed the secret deals through illegal sentencing schemes, was removed from the bench and incarcerated on unrelated theft charges. Bissell, after learning of Dugan’s confession on TV news, took flight with federal authorities in pursuit and later died by suicide when police tried to apprehend him. Wright’s remaining convictions were vacated, and after having spent over seven years in prison, he was immediately released and ultimately exonerated of all the charges. The Supreme Court of New Jersey affirmed that decision.

=== Post-release career ===
After his release from prison, Wright pursued law and graduated with the degree of Bachelors of Science in Human Services from Thomas Edison State University in 2002, entering law school in 2004 and graduating from St. Thomas University School of Law in 2007. After attaining admission to the bar in 2008, Wright spent the next nine years being investigated by the New Jersey Bar’s Committee on Character before being granted admission to the bar by the New Jersey Supreme Court on September 27, 2017. On that date, Wright became the first and only person in American history to have been sentenced to life in prison, securing his own release and exoneration, and then being granted a license to practice law by the very court that condemned him.

In 2017, 50 Cent signed a deal to produce a TV series For Life, inspired by Wright’s life.

In August 2022, Wright published a memoir, Marked for Life: One Man's Fight for Justice from the Inside.

== Politics ==
In December 2020, Wright announced that he was running for mayor of New York City as a Democrat.
