= Spuk im Reich der Schatten =

- Country of origin: Germany

Spuk im Reich der Schatten is a German television series.

== See also ==
- Spuk aus der Gruft (1997)
- Spuk am Tor der Zeit (2002)
- List of German television series
