= Lisa Vicari =

German actress (born 1997)

- Born: 11 February 1997 (age 29); Munich, Germany
- Occupation: Actress
- Years active: 2009–present
- Known for: Dark; Isi & Ossi

Lisa Vicari (born 11 February 1997) is a German actress. She is known for portraying Martha Nielsen in the Netflix series Dark and the lead role of Isi in the Netflix original film Isi & Ossi.

== Biography ==
Vicari was born in Munich in 1997, into a family of doctors. She is of Italian descent. At the age of ten, she took an improvisational theatre course and shortly thereafter appeared in her first short film, Tunnelblicke. In 2010, she acted in the children's film Hanni & Nanni. The following year, she played Leonie in the post-apocalyptic film Hell. In 2017, Vicari starred as the title character in the Khaled Kaissar film Luna, in which she plays a teenager whose father is secretly a Russian agent and whose family is being wiped out before her eyes. From 2017 to 2020, she portrayed Martha Nielsen, the love interest of Jonas and sister of the missing Mikkel in the Netflix science fiction series Dark. Vicari studies media science in Potsdam.

In 2020, Vicari played Isi, the daughter of a billionaire, in the romantic comedy Isi & Ossi, one of the first German Netflix films. In 2022, she was cast as Django's daughter Sarah in Django, a television series reimagining Sergio Corbucci's 1966 spaghetti Western. In the 2026 second season of the Apple TV+ thriller Hijack, Vicari played Clara Berger, a rookie transit worker.

== Filmography ==
=== Film ===
List of film appearances, with year, title, and role shown
| Year | Title | Role | Notes |
|---|---|---|---|
| 2009 | Tunnelblicke | | Short film |
| 2010 | Viki Ficki | | Short film |
| 2010 | Hanni & Nanni | Suse | |
| 2011 | Hell | Leonie | |
| 2011 | Someone Like Him | Maren | |
| 2014 | Playing Doctor | Lilli | |
| 2017 | Luna | Luna | |
| 2017 | Einmal bitte alles | Mieke | |
| 2018 | Schwimmen | Anthea | |
| 2020 | Isi & Ossi | Isi | |
| 2021 | Hannes | Nele | |
| 2021 | Das Haus | Layla | |
| 2021 | Am Ende der Worte | Laura | |

=== Television ===
List of television appearances, with year, title, and role shown
| Year | Title | Role | Notes |
|---|---|---|---|
| 2011 | Und dennoch lieben wir | Tessa | Television film |
| 2013 | Unter Verdacht | Nadine Schmolzer | Episode: "Ohne Vergebung" |
| 2014 | Die Chefin | Vanessa Willski | Episode: Tod eines Lehrers" |
| 2016 | SOKO München | Jenny Saiber | Episode: "Das Halstuch" |
| 2017 | Zwei Sturköpfe im Dreivierteltakt | Sophie Grimm | Television film Also known as Zwei Tänzer für Isolde |
| 2017 | Tatort | Jasna Nemec | Episode: "Amour fou" |
| 2017–2020 | Dark | Martha Nielsen | Main cast |
| 2022–2023 | Django | Sarah | Main cast |
| 2023 | Herrhausen – Der Herr des Geldes | Tania Fehling | 4 episodes |
| 2025 | The Next Level | Rosa Bernhard | Main cast |
| 2026 | Hijack | Clara Berger | Main cast (season 2) |

== Awards and nominations ==
- Award for Best Young Talent at the New Faces Awards for the role of Leonie in Hell (2011)
- Nomination for the Young German Cinema Award at the Munich Film Festival for her role in Luna (2017)
