= Spuk am Tor der Zeit =

- Country of origin: Germany

Spuk am Tor der Zeit (English: Spook at the gate of time) is the conclusion of the trilogy The Mummy of Roggelin. The children's series based on the "Spooky" series by Günter Meyer is thus the continuation of Spuk im Reich der Schatten (Ghost in the Realm of Shadows).

== Synopsis ==
Marko (13) experiences a fantastic adventure. He lives in a village and makes a huge discovery in the cemetery. From a family vault, he is drawn into a time tunnel and lands in 1766. There, he meets one of his ancestors, who is only thirteen years old himself. Both are confused, and thus begins their adventure.

== Episodes ==
1. The gate in the time
2. The big game
3. Butterflies in the hay
4. Tree of Remembrance

== See also ==
- Spuk aus der Gruft (1997)
- Spuk im Reich der Schatten (2000)
- List of German television series
