= Spuk aus der Gruft =

- Country of origin: Germany

Spuk aus der Gruft is a German television series.

== See also ==
- Spuk im Reich der Schatten (2000)
- Spuk am Tor der Zeit (2002)
- List of German television series
