= Hanni & Nanni =

- Film poster
- Directed by: Christine Hartmann
- Written by: Katharina Reschke; Jane Ainscough
- Based on: St. Clare's by Enid Blyton
- Production companies: UFA Cinema; Feine Filme; ZDF
- Distributed by: Universal Pictures International
- Release date: 17 June 2010
- Country: Germany
- Language: German

Hanni & Nanni is a 2010 German children´s film directed by Christine Hartmann. The screenplay of the film was written by Jane Ainscough based on the St. Clare's-books by Enid Blyton. It was followed by Hanni & Nanni 2, directed by Julia von Heinz and released in Germany on 2012. Consequently, Hanni & Nanni concluded with the last movie, Hanni & Nanni 3 which was directed by Dagmar Seume and released in 2013.

== Plot ==
Hanni and Nanni are Sullivan are sent by their parents to the Lindenhof boarding school after causing a commotion in a department store. While Nanni quickly makes friends, Hanni finds it harder to adjust. When a hockey tournament against the girls from their former school approaches, the sisters face a difficult decision.

== Production ==
The film was produced by UFA Cinema GmbH in co-production with ZDF. Principal filming took place from 15 July to 18 September 2009 in Berlin, Hesse and Bavaria.

== Cast ==
- Sophia Münster as Hanni
- Jana Münster as Nanni
- Hannelore Elsner as Frau Theobald
- Heino Ferch as George Sullivan
- Suzanne von Borsody as Frau Mägerlein
- Anja Kling as Jule Sullivan
- Katharina Thalbach as Mademoiselle Bertoux
- Oliver Pocher as Rüdiger Hack
- Zoe Thurau as Jenny
- Aleen Jana Kötter as Erika
- Lisa Vicari as Suse
- Ricarda Zimmerer as Kathrin
- Emilie Kundrun as Oktavia
- Eva Haushofer as Antonia
- Davina Schmid as Linda Turn
