= W. Lindsay Cable =

Scottish artist (1900–1949)

William Lindsay Cable (31 March 1900 – 12 April 1949) was a Scottish artist and book illustrator. He illustrated Enid Blyton's books in 1940 and 1942, and worked for the Ministry of Information. He also worked for a number of years for Punch magazine.

Cable was born on 31 March 1900 in Lochee, Forfarshire, Scotland, the son of Thomas and Mary Cable, his father was a cabinet maker and undertaker. During a childhood illness he discovered a talent for painting and drawing. He worked for the Dundee Advertiser before moving to London where he opened his own studio. He later moved to Dorset when he married Minnie Hamden in 1938. During the Second World War he moved back to Scotland and illustrated books for the Ministry of Information and spent two years at Dundee College of Art due to the shortage of teachers during the war.

Cable died suddenly at his home in Dundee on 12 April 1949, aged 49.
