= George Jaques =

English actor and filmmaker

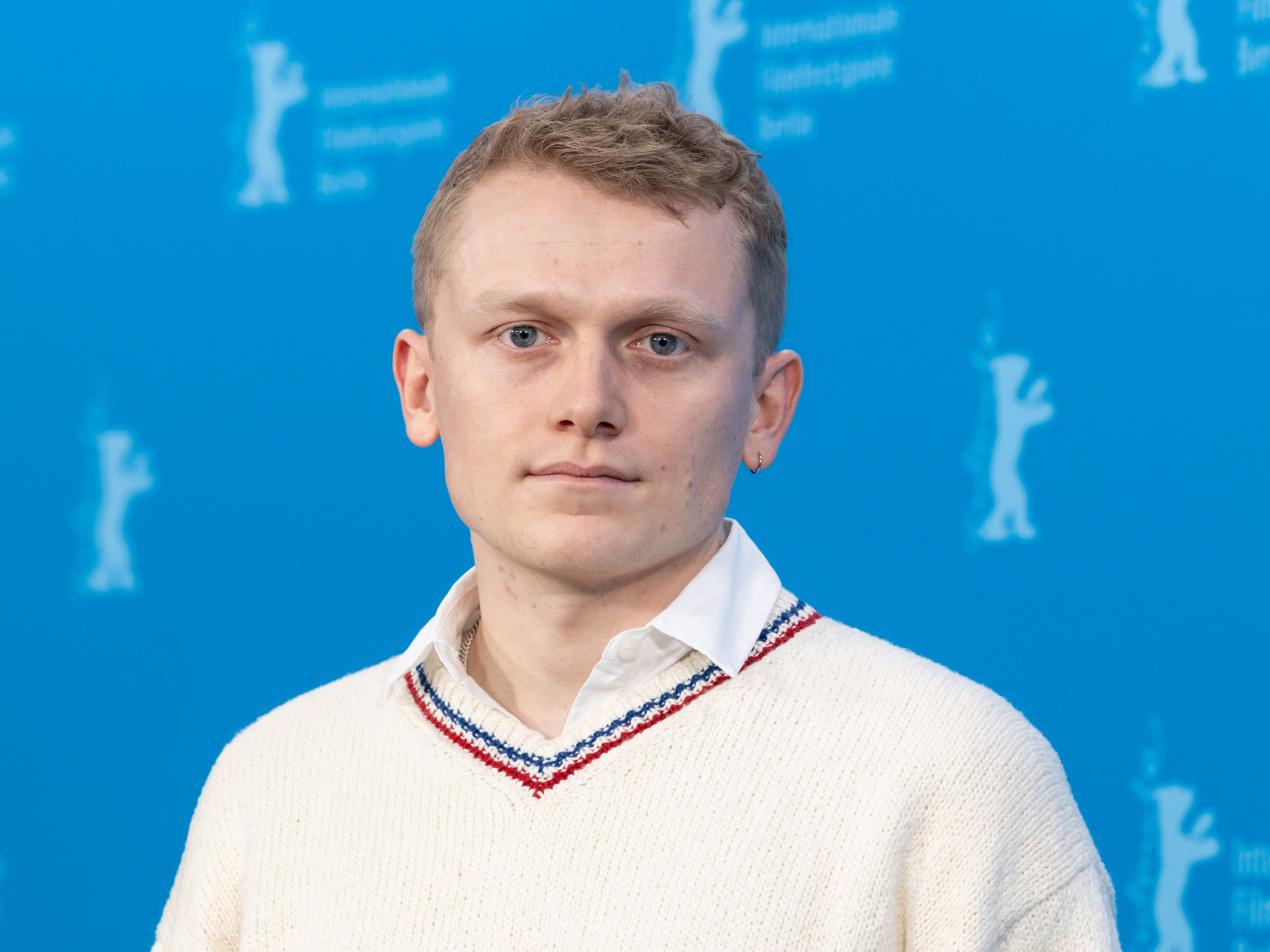
- Jaques in 2026
- Occupations: Actor; director; writer; producer
- Years active: 2019–present

George Jaques is a British actor, director, writer, and producer. He wrote and directed the film Sunny Dancer (2026). His acting credits include The Serpent Queen (2022) and A Town Called Malice (2023).

== Career ==
Having started off writing plays as teenager which were performed in Clapham and London Bridge, Jaques went on to write, direct and produce five short films, three of which (Cracked, Tuesday and Tiny Dancer) he shot in a single week in 2020, and the first of which, Silence he co-produced with Jason Flemyng. Jaques was named a Screen International Star of Tomorrow for directing, writing, acting and producing in 2022, the first person to be nominated in all four categories.

Jaques' debut feature film Black Dog (2023), a British teen road-trip movie, premiered at the BFI London Film Festival and received a nomination for Best First Feature. He had written the film with actor Jamie Flatters, with the pair producing through Jaques' production company Athenaeum Productions which he had founded at the age of 16 years-old. The film's cast includes Flatters, with Ruby Stokes, Paul Kaye and Nicholas Pinnock and was shot over four weeks with a budget of £500,000 with David Parfitt as an executive producer.

His second feature film Sunny Dancer starring Bella Ramsey, Daniel Quinn-Toye, Stokes, Earl Cave, Jasmine Elcock, Conrad Khan, James Norton, Jessica Gunning, Shalom Brune-Franklin, James Blunt and Neil Patrick Harris was released in 2026 having premiered at the Berlin International Film Festival.

As an actor, Jaques had his breakthrough in 2020, as co-lead opposite Jude Law in HBO and Marc Munden’s 12-hour live single-camera show The Third Day: Autumn. Jaques has also appeared as King Francis II of France in television series The Serpent Queen (2022) alongside Samantha Morton, and Sky Drama series A Town Called Malice (2023) with Dougray Scott and Jason Flemyng.

== Personal life ==
From South West London, his father worked as a builder and his mother as an estate agent. He has one sister. Jaques is an ambassador for Teenage Cancer Trust. He turned down a place to study business management at the University of Bristol in order to pursue filmmaking.

== Filmography ==
Year	Title	Role	Notes
2020	The Third Day: Autumn	Young Esus	
2020	Can I Tell You Something?		Short film
2022	Death on the Nile	German soldier 2	
2022	The Serpent Queen	Francis II	5 episodes
2023	A Town Called Malice	Anthony Lord	8 episodes
2023	Surprised by Oxford	Bill	
2024	One Punch	Jamie	Short film

=== As director ===
Year	Title	Notes
2019	Silence	Short film
2020	Can I Tell You Something?	Short film
2021	Tuesday	Short film
2021	Tiny Dancer	Short film
2021	Cracked	Short film
2023	Black Dog	Also writer and producer
2024	Stingy Old Fella	Short film
2026	Sunny Dancer	Also writer and producer
