= The Burning Girls (novel) =

2021 novel by C.J.Tudor

- Author: C. J. Tudor
- Language: English
- Genre: Horror
- Publisher: Michael Joseph
- Publication date: January 21, 2021
- Media type: Print
- Pages: 400
- ISBN: 978-0241371305

The Burning Girls is a 2021 horror novel by British author C. J. Tudor. It was published in 2021 by Michael Joseph. The novel follows Jack Brooks, a reverend who moves into a new parish with her teenage daughter Flo to face a series of disturbing events, and a gruesome local legend that seems linked with the murder of two teenage girls 30 years previously.

Tudor has stated in interview that her inspiration for the book came from seeing a small, whitewashed chapel on the outskirts of a village in East Sussex. She researched the history of the area and found that during Queen Mary I's purge of the Protestants, 17 people had been martyred there. Locals still celebrated this anniversary by burning effigies. From this story came The Burning Girls, which is also influenced, the author has said, by The Wicker Man (1973).

It was adapted as a limited six-part series for Paramount+ in 2023.

== Background ==
The novel originated from the author's personal experience of moving to a rural village in East Sussex, England. The discovery of an unusual, isolated whitewashed chapel in the surrounding countryside provided the initial inspiration for the novel. Its mysterious appearance sparked Tudor's imagination and eventually became the basis for the fictional village of Chapel Croft.

The development of the novel was strongly influenced by Tudor's subsequent research into the region's history, particularly the religious persecutions during the reign of Mary I and the execution of Protestant martyrs in Sussex. These historical events provided the foundations for the novel's central imagery of religious persecution, martyrdom and burning. Tudor also drew inspiration from local traditions, including Bonfire Night celebrations, which contributed to the story's unsettling atmosphere and exploration of ritualistic violence. In terms of literary influences, the novel reflects Tudor's interest in British folk horror, particularly the film The Wicker Man (1973). Its depiction of an isolated rural community, mysterious traditions, religious beliefs and concealed violence demonstrates the influence of this genre.

Tudor also combines these elements with conventions of Gothic fiction, supernatural horror and psychological thrillers, creating a narrative in which historical events and contemporary mysteries become interconnected.

== Plot summary ==
Reverend Jack Brooks and her teenage daughter Flo arrive from their home in Nottingham to a new parish in rural Sussex, hoping for a fresh start. They find the villagers of Chapel Croft celebrating a 500-year-old piece of local history, during which two young girls were tortured and burnt at the stake. The Burning Girls, as they are now known, are believed to appear to the living as a portent of misfortune, and their deaths are still commemorated through the village tradition of making dolls from twigs, which are then burnt in remembrance.

Jack and Flo have a close relationship. Flo's father, who was also a priest, was murdered when Flo was a baby. Though Flo dislikes Chapel Croft and misses her home in Nottingham, she determines to make the best of her stay. But several unsettling incidents occur, including the delivery of a threatening note and an exorcism kit to the Vicarage. Flo has a vision of the Burning Girls, and Jack learns that her predecessor attempted to burn down the chapel before committing suicide. We also learn that the community is still marked by the disappearance of two teenage girls, 30 years ago.

Jack falls foul of Simon Harper, an influential local landowner believed to be a descendant of the Sussex Martyrs. Flo befriends Lucas Wrigley, a loner of her own age. Jack disapproves of the friendship, but is struggling with her own problems as her past threatens to catch up with her.

The two village girls who disappeared, Merry and Joy, vanished in the wake of an exorcism attempt. The local curate, Benjamin Grady, left at about the same time. Jack learns that her predecessor in Chapel Croft was obsessed with the story of the two missing girls, and starts to wonder whether there is more to his apparent suicide. Meanwhile, in Nottingham, Jack's successor has been murdered by a mysterious drifter who seems intent on tracking down Jack and her family. As the drifter approaches Chapel Croft, having committed two more murders, we learn that this is Jack's brother, Jacob, who has been institutionalized following the murder of Jack's husband.

An incident in the chapel leads to Flo falling through rotten floorboards and uncovering a cache of old coffins, which prove that Simon Harper's ancestor was not martyred, as Harper claims. Further investigation reveals a more recent body hidden in one of the old coffins: that of Grady, the missing curate. As the different strands of the story come together, we finally discover the link between the two girls' disappearance and the suicide of the previous vicar, and uncover the secrets beneath the surface of the Chapel Croft community.

== Reception ==
The Burning Girls was a Richard and Judy Book Club pick, and Kirkus Reviews called it: "Top-notch and deliciously creepy storytelling," while Publishers Weekly said: "Tudor expertly doles out the plot twists, some of them small, some sizable, and one so shocking that it turns the entire story inside out." Carmen Clark from Booklist, wrote: "Fans of Gillian Flynn, Tana French, and Jess Lourey will leap at the chance to read Tudor’s new psychological thriller."

Toni V. Sweeney from New York: Journal of Books wrote: "It’s entertaining reading with chills of the 'sneaking-up-on-you' kind, with plenty of descriptions of dark and brooding graveyards with blasted headstones to set the proper scene. Anyone who has read The Chalk Man, or The Other People, will enjoy The Burning Girls." Ray Palen from Bookreporter wrote: "There are enough plot twists, including one that most readers will not see coming, to keep you on your toes right through to the unexpected and highly satisfying finale of this consistently creepy psychological thriller."

== Adaptation ==
The Burning Girls was adapted as a six-part series in 2023, adapted by Hans Rosenfeldt and Camilla Ahlgren. Developed by Buccaneer Media for Paramount+, it stars Samantha Morton and Ruby Stokes. It received somewhat mixed reviews, being described in The Guardian as: "Solid, spooky, sanguinary fare," but by The Telegraph as "the Vicar of Dibley meets The Wicker Man."
