= C. J. Tudor =

British author

- Tudor in 2021
- Born: Caroline Jane Tudor; 25 November 1971 (age 54); Salisbury, England
- Occupation: Writer
- Children: 1
- Writing career
- Pen name: C. J. Tudor
- Genres: Horror; Psychological thriller; Mystery
- Notable works: The Chalk Man; The Burning Girls
- Website: cjtudor.com

Caroline Jane Tudor (born 25 November 1971), known by her pen name C. J. Tudor, is a British author whose books include The Chalk Man and The Hiding Place (titled The Taking of Annie Thorne in the U.S.).

== Early life and career ==
Tudor was born in Salisbury, England but grew up in Nottingham. She left school at 16 against her teachers' advice, and in spite of her good grades. She states that she was inspired to write by her English teacher, and names Stephen King among her influences. She worked in a variety of jobs, including "copywriting, television presenting and dogwalking", before becoming a full-time writer. She says: "I’ve always loved writing but didn’t really knuckle down to it until my mid-thirties."

Her first novel, The Chalk Man, was published in January 2018 by Crown Publishing. Reviews were mixed. The Sun said "[Tudor] weaves a complex and captivating story in her first novel.". The Irish Independent said the book "has an intriguing and creepy premise — but ultimately falls apart after a series of improbable, shading to outlandish, plot twists." The book received the 2019 Barry Award for Best First Novel.

This was followed by The Hiding Place in 2019, The Other People in 2020, The Burning Girls in 2021, The Drift in 2023, and The Gathering in 2024.

In 2023, The Burning Girls was adapted for as a TV series by Hans Rosenfeldt and Camilla Ahlgren. It was developed by Buccaneer Media for Paramount+, starring Samantha Morton and Ruby Stokes.

== Personal life ==
C. J. Tudor lives in Sussex with her partner and daughter.

== Bibliography ==
=== Novels ===
- The Chalk Man (2018)
- The Hiding Place (Note: titled The Taking of Annie Thorne in the United States) (2019)
- The Other People (2020)
- The Burning Girls (2021)
- The Drift (2023)
- The Gathering (2024)
- Serenity Falls (2026)

=== Collections ===
- A Sliver of Darkness (2022)

=== Short stories ===
- "The Man in the Box" - included in The Other People audiobook
- "The Lion at the Gate" - included in The Other People audiobook
- "The February House" - included in The Other People audiobook
- "Butterfly Island" in After Sundown anthology
