= Sunny Dancer =

British comedy drama film

- Theatrical release poster
- Directed by: George Jaques
- Screenplay by: George Jaques
- Produced by: Ken Petrie; George Jaques
- Starring: Bella Ramsey; Daniel Quinn-Toye; Ruby Stokes; Earl Cave; Jasmine Elcock; Conrad Khan; Jessica Gunning; James Norton; Neil Patrick Harris
- Cinematography: Oliver Loncraine
- Edited by: Caitlin Spiller
- Music by: Este Haim; Zachary Dawes
- Production companies: 27 Ten Productions; Athenaeum Productions; Night Train Media
- Distributed by: Embankment Films
- Release dates: 13 February 2026 (Berlinale); 14 August 2026 (United Kingdom)
- Running time: 106 minutes
- Country: United Kingdom
- Language: English
- Box office: $345,354

Sunny Dancer is a 2026 British coming-of-age comedy film from George Jaques and starring Bella Ramsey, Daniel Quinn-Toye, Ruby Stokes, Earl Cave, Jasmine Elcock, Conrad Khan, Jessica Gunning, James Norton and Neil Patrick Harris.

The film had its world premiere as the opening night film of the Generation 14plus section of the 76th Berlin International Film Festival on 13 February 2026, where it was nominated for the Crystal Bear. The film received positive reviews from critics.

== Plot ==
Ivy Pritchard is a 17-year-old leukaemia survivor, having been in remission for 10 months. As she struggles to maintain friendships at school following her diagnosis, her parents sign her up for CRF Camp, a 4-week summer camp for minors with cancer. Despite Ivy's reluctance, she agrees to go.

Upon arrival, she meets camp president Patrick, outdoors lead Tristan, camp therapist Lucy and nurse Brenda, followed by her dormmate Ella who has a crush on Tristan and hopes to lose her virginity at camp. Ella tries to integrate Ivy into the group of senior campers consisting of Archie, Jake, Maisie and Ralph, but Ivy remains distant. Following a verbal fight between Ivy and a guest speaker, Patrick admonishes Ivy. She denigrates the camp, accuses Patrick of having a "paedo wall" with photos of former campers and starts to leave before returning to apologise. She agrees to therapy sessions with Lucy.

Ivy gradually connects with the other campers, sharing stories and engaging in small acts of rebellion against the camp leadership. The group visits a fairground but are harassed by locals, resulting in a brawl when Archie punches a person for offending Ella. On their return, the campers are spoken to by Patrick. When Ivy accuses him of taking the role of camp president to feel powerful, Patrick reveals that the photos on the wall are of campers who have passed away, including his youngest son. He tells her that there are many children who are sick who wish they could be in her position.

Ivy develops a romantic relationship with Jake, comforting him after an anxiety attack and having sex with him during an island survival activity. The following morning, Ralph reveals that he has to return to hospital the next day. The group agree to act as though everything is normal and Ivy teaches them a dance to "I Don't Feel Like Dancin'" that her family created to make light of dark times.

Ivy and Jake are caught by Patrick when trying to take Ralph for a night out. Patrick agrees to let them go following Ivy's reminder of his earlier words. Ivy and Jake later confess their love for each other. Ella sets up a date with Tristan for her 18th birthday but he is unaware of her interest in him, instead telling her that she reminds him of his deceased younger sister. The campers tell Ella that Archie has a crush on her; she reciprocates and the pair have sex.

Jake goes missing and does not respond to Ivy's calls, leaving her despondent. Rumours circle that he was taken to hospital after speaking to Brenda. Jake returns to visit Ivy and explains that he was sent to hospital when he complained about chest pains. The couple discuss plans for the end of camp talent show and the future.

Ivy dances to "I Don't Feel Like Dancin'" at the talent show as her friends and family cheer for her. Patrick explains that despite the ups and downs of her camp visit, he is proud of the person she has become. When Lucy begins to describe the difficulties of losing someone close, Ivy notices Jake's photo on the wall and has an emotional breakdown; it is revealed that Jake had died of a heart attack and Ivy had only imagined him returning to camp.

Two weeks later, Ivy has not kept in contact with the other campers. She has a discussion with her mother about Jake and dealing with grief. Ivy opens a memory box given to her by Ella and watches Ella's home movie of the trip, crying and smiling at its contents.

== Cast ==
- Bella Ramsey as Ivy
- Daniel Quinn-Toye as Jake
- Ruby Stokes as Ella
- Earl Cave as Ralph
- Jasmine Elcock as Maisie
- Conrad Khan as Archie
- Jessica Gunning as Karen, Ivy's Mum
- James Norton as Bob, Ivy's Dad
- Neil Patrick Harris as Patrick
- Shalom Brune-Franklin as Lucy
- Louis Gaunt as Tristan
- Josie Walker as Brenda
- James Blunt as himself

== Production ==
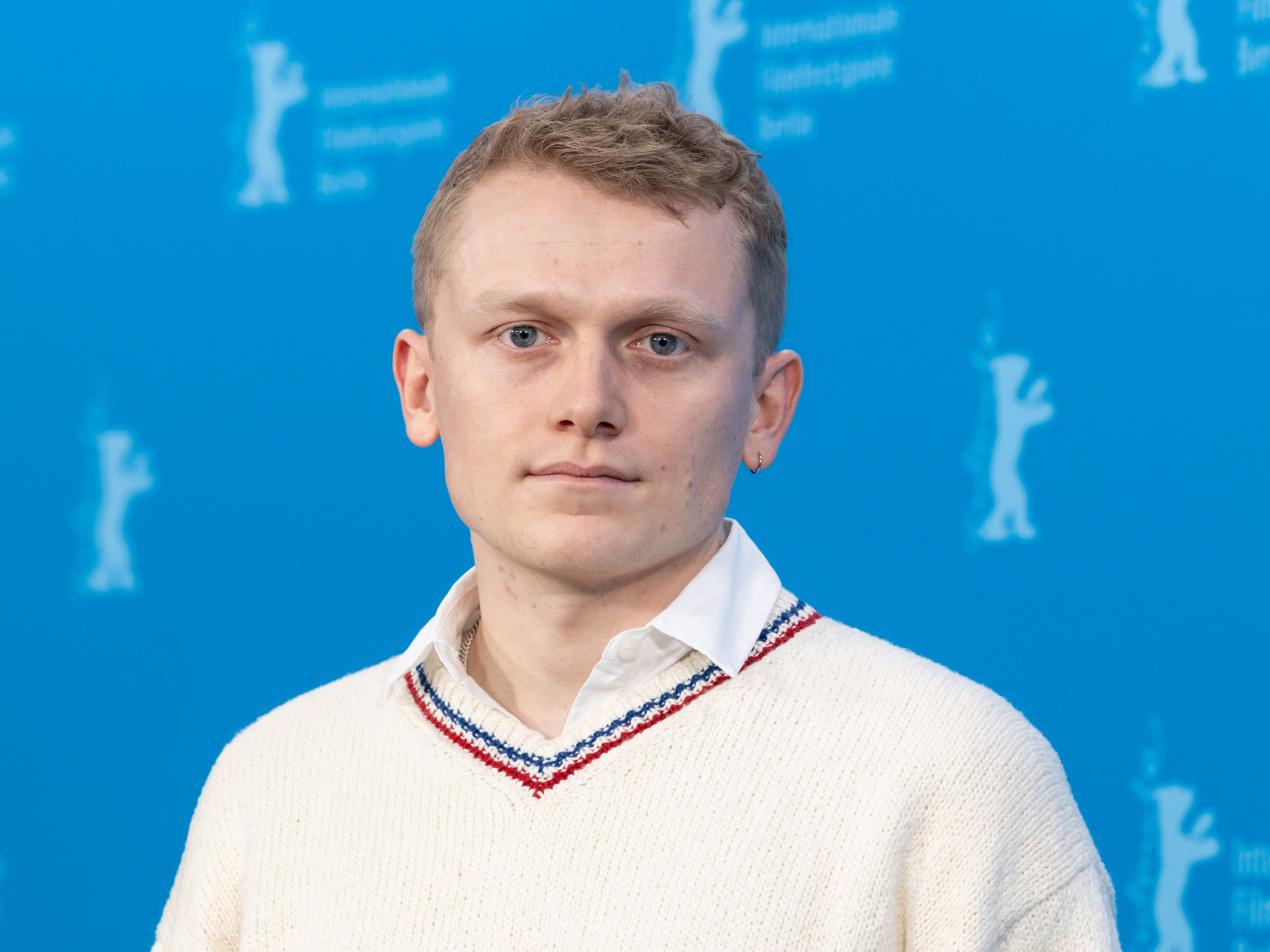
Sunny Dancer was written, directed and produced by George Jaques.

Ken Petrie produced the film under his 27 Ten banner alongside George Jaques and his production company, Athenaeum Productions. Jaques wrote the script with Ruby Stokes in mind for the cast. He has said that despite the main characters being in cancer remission there is "not a single hospital scene" and that he "wanted to make a film where cancer was the least interesting thing about them. They have these skills, this whole life, because they are still teenagers".

Alongside Stokes, Bella Ramsey was cast in 2024. James Norton, Neil Patrick Harris and Jessica Gunning joined the cast in February 2025. Este Haim of Haim and Zachary Dawes provided the musical score. James Blunt makes a musical cameo appearance in the film. Jaques said in a British Vogue interview that "the scale of the film is massive for a British indie".

Principal photography began in April 2025 at Auchengillan Outdoor Centre near Loch Lomond, Scotland.

== Release ==
The film premiered at the 76th Berlin International Film Festival on 13 February 2026. True Brit Entertainment releases Sunny Dancer in the UK in the summer of 2026, with other territories to be announced after Berlin. The film will release in the UK-Ireland on August 14, 2026. The Teenage Cancer Trust announced on their Instagram their partnership with the film. The film premiered in the US on September 18th, 2026.

The film will have free preview screenings at more than 120 independent UK cinemas on 27–28 July 2026 through the Escapes cinema initiative, a UK initiative that offers complimentary cinema tickets to help make independent films more accessible, ahead of its nationwide release.

Sunny Dancer was the opening film of the 56th Giffoni Film Festival on 17 July 2026. The film was also be part of the Wilderness Festival's lineup on 1 August 2026 in Cornbury Park, Oxfordshire.

== Reception ==
Berlinale director Tricia Tuttle calls this film "a hidden gem". IndieWire named it one of the "12 films we're excited about heading into the 76th Berlinale".

=== Critical response ===
Ben Rolph of Next Best Picture called Sunny Dancer "a film about joy, which Jaques translates effortlessly to the screen". He praised Ramsey for "once again proving what a talent they really are... nails both the humour and the emotion". Alex Billington of FirstShowing.net says Ramsey is "extraordinary in the lead role in this film – they handle the weight of it all just right," further describing them balancing "the complexity of the character as written, with the dynamic of the whole situation, the cliche angst of being a teen, and her own rebellious attitude". Laura Della Corte of The Upcoming said Ramsey "delivers a phenomenal lead performance as Ivy, showcasing incredible range by seamlessly blending sharp humour with profound emotion". Serena Seghedoni of Loud and Clear Reviews wrote that Ramsey "really excels at letting Ivy's pain out at exactly the right time" and "there are some highly affecting moments that will stay with you for a long time after the credits roll".

Leslie Felperin of The Hollywood Reporter said it was "decidedly uneven but fitfully charming". Nikki Baughan of Screen Daily said the film "wraps its heavy themes in a peppy, accessible package". Peter Bradshaw of The Guardian says "the film has buoyancy and sunshine" and that Jaques "executes a smart misdirection-twist". Christian Zilko of IndieWire said Jaques "made a bleak subgenre of cinema a little bit sunnier". Neil Baker of Cinerama says "there's no denying the comedic charm, emotional depth and brilliance of Jaques's sophomore picture". Brent Hankins of the Lamp Light Review says "for fans of coming-of-age films that color outside the established lines, Sunny Dancer is essential viewing".

=== Accolades ===
The film was nominated for Best Ensemble Performance and Best Music Supervision at the British Independent Film Awards.
