= Days of the Bagnold Summer (film) =

- Film poster
- Directed by: Simon Bird
- Screenplay by: Lisa Owens
- Based on: Days of the Bagnold Summer by Joff Winterhart
- Produced by: Matthew James Wilkinson
- Starring: Monica Dolan; Earl Cave; Rob Brydon; Tamsin Greig; Alice Lowe; Elliot Speller-Gillott
- Cinematography: Simon Tindall
- Edited by: Ashley White
- Music by: Belle and Sebastian
- Distributed by: Altitude Film Distribution
- Release dates: 14 August 2019 (Locarno); 8 June 2020 (United Kingdom)
- Running time: 86 minutes
- Country: United Kingdom
- Language: English

Days of the Bagnold Summer is a 2019 British coming-of-age comedy-drama film directed by Simon Bird (in his feature film directorial debut), starring Monica Dolan, Earl Cave, Rob Brydon, Tamsin Greig, and Tim Key, with a musical score by Belle and Sebastian. The film was based on the 2012 graphic novel of the same name by Joff Winterhart, adapted for the screen by Bird’s wife Lisa Owens.

The film premiered at the 2019 Locarno Film Festival. As of October 2021, the film holds a 92% approval rating on Rotten Tomatoes, based on 51 reviews with an average rating of 7.3/10. The site's critical consensus reads, "Days of the Bagnold Summer draws on well-rounded performances from its leads to fill in the familiar outlines of its coming-of-age story with gentle humor and tender insight."

== Plot ==
Daniel Bagnold, a withdrawn and heavy metal–obsessed teenager, is preparing to spend the summer holidays with his father and his father’s new family in Florida. However, when the trip is unexpectedly cancelled, he is forced to remain at home in suburban England with his mother, Sue, a well-meaning but socially awkward librarian. Over the course of six weeks, Daniel and Sue struggle to coexist, frequently clashing over their differing personalities and expectations. Daniel isolates himself, focusing on his interest in music and attempting to start a band, while Sue makes repeated efforts to reconnect with him and improve their relationship. As the summer progresses, both characters experience moments of frustration, loneliness, and self-reflection. Sue tentatively pursues a romantic relationship, while Daniel navigates friendships and personal setbacks. Gradually, their strained relationship softens, and they begin to develop a greater understanding of one another, leading to a quiet reconciliation by the end of the summer.

== Cast ==
- Monica Dolan as Sue Bagnold
- Earl Cave as Daniel
- Elliot Speller-Gillott as Ky
- Tamsin Greig as Astrid
- Ony Uhiara as Esther
- Rob Brydon as Douglas Porter
- Alice Lowe as Carol
- Grace Hogg-Robinson as Katie
- Nathanael Saleh as Alex
- George Wilkins as Jake
- Alfie Todd as George
- Tim Key as Dale
- Lesley Harcourt as Nancy
- Indeyarna Donaldson-Holness as Sophie
