= Elliot Speller-Gillott =

British actor and musician

- Born: 29 November 2000 (age 24)
- Occupation(s): Actor and musician
- Years active: 2010–present
- Known for: Uncle

Elliot Speller-Gillott is a British actor and musician who is best known for starring alongside Nick Helm in the BBC Three sitcom Uncle (2014–2017).

== Career ==
Speller-Gillott made his acting debut in 2010, playing a role in the long-running British medical drama Holby City. He was also cast in a Swedish advert for headache medication.

At the age of 12, he starred in the broadcast pilot of Uncle on Channel 4, which was later commissioned for three seasons by BBC Three. Speller-Gillott played Errol, who forms an unlikely friendship with his uncle Andy (Nick Helm) through circumstance and their shared love of music. The pair performed many songs throughout the series.

In 2017, Speller-Gillott stated he intended to pursue music, with the aim of joining an orchestra or a band.

== Filmography ==
Year	Title	Role	Medium	Notes
2010	Holby City	Sami	Television	One episode
2010	The Caterpillar and Fly	Oscar	Short film	Credited as "Elliot Speller-Mason"
2012	Uncle	Errol	Television	Main role, broadcast pilot
2014	Harry and Paul's Story of the 2s	Harry Potter – Dennis from Heaven	TV Movie	
2014–2017	Uncle	Errol	Television	Main role, 19 episodes
2019	Days of the Bagnold Summer	Ky	Film	Supporting role

== Discography ==
- You Can’t Eat Out Of The Singing Bowl (2017)
- Trousers Of The Mind (2017)
