= Derbez =

Derbez is a French surname. Notable people with the surname include:

- Silvia Derbez (1932–2002), Mexican actress
  - Her son Eugenio Derbez (born 1961), actor, director and comedian
    - His daughter Aislinn Derbez (born 1987), actress and model
    - His son Vadhir Derbez (born 1991), actor
    - His son José Eduardo Derbez (born 1992), actor
- Luis Ernesto Derbez (born 1947), Mexican politician
