= De viaje con los Derbez =

- Genre: Documentary comedy
- Country of origin: United States
- Original language: Spanish
- No. of seasons: 5
- No. of episodes: 37

Production
- Production companies: Lionsgate; 3Pas Studios; Wallin Chambers Entertainment

Original release
- Network: Amazon Prime Video
- Release: 18 October 2019 – 10 October 2025

De viaje con los Derbez (English: Derbez Family Vacation) is a Spanish-language documentary comedy television series co-produced by Lionsgate, 3Pas Studios, and Wallin Chambers Entertainment. It premiered on 18 October 2019 on Amazon Prime Video worldwide, except for United States, and Puerto Rico, where it streams on Vix since the third season. The series revolves around the Derbez family on their trips to various destinations.

In October 2023, the series was renewed for a fourth season, that premiered on 24 November 2023.

== Cast ==
- Eugenio Derbez, the patriarch of the family
- Alessandra Rosaldo, Eugenio's wife
- Aitana Derbez is Eugenio and Alessandra's daughter
- Vadhir Derbez is Eugenio's oldest son
- José Eduardo Derbez is Eugenio's youngest son with ex-wife Victoria Ruffo
- Aislinn Derbez is Eugenio's eldest daughter with ex-wife Gabriela Michel
- Mauricio Ochmann, Aislinn's then-husband
- Kailani is Aislinn and Mauricio's daughter

== Episodes ==
=== Series overview ===
Series	Episodes	Originally released	
Series	Episodes	First released	Last released
1	9	18 October 2019	25 October 2019
2	7	20 May 2021	27 May 2021
3	7	7 April 2023	21 April 2023
4	7	24 November 2023	8 December 2023
5	7	26 September 2025	10 October 2025

=== Season 1 (2019) ===
No. overall	No. in season	Title	Original release date
1	1	"Bienvenidos a Marruecos"	18 October 2019
2	2	"Formula ¿eh?"	18 October 2019
3	3	"La cabra siempre tira al monte"	18 October 2019
4	4	"Rojo rojo"	18 October 2019
5	5	"Yalla Yalla"	18 October 2019
6	6	"La familia Bereberes"	18 October 2019
7	7	"Chiquitbum bombita"	18 October 2019
8	8	"Tentando al diablo"	18 October 2019
9	9	"Tres meses después"	25 October 2019

=== Season 2 (2021) ===
No. overall	No. in season	Title	Original release date
10	1	"¡Listo!"	20 May 2021
11	2	"Campamento Derbez"	20 May 2021
12	3	"¡Llamas, llamas, llamas!"	20 May 2021
13	4	"¡Forward 1!"	27 May 2021
14	5	"¡Yo amo Montana!"	27 May 2021
15	6	"La última y nos vamos"	27 May 2021
16	7	"Tres meses después"	27 May 2021

=== Season 3 (2023) ===
No. overall	No. in season	Title	Original release date
17	1	"La promesa"	7 April 2023
18	2	"El cómplice"	7 April 2023
19	3	"¡No Mamas Way!"	14 April 2023
20	4	"El gran escape"	14 April 2023
21	5	"El vuelo"	21 April 2023
22	6	"¡Dale, dale, dale!"	21 April 2023
23	7	"Entre tuertos y conclusiones"	21 April 2023

=== Season 4 (2023) ===
No. overall	No. in season	Title	Original release date
24	1	"Muy, muy lejano"	24 November 2023
25	2	"En el Círculo Artico"	24 November 2023
26	3	"Hielo ahí"	24 November 2023
27	4	"La casa de Santa Claus"	1 December 2023
28	5	"Derbez medieval"	1 December 2023
29	6	"Cerrando con broche de hielo"	8 December 2023
30	7	"Promesa antes de Navidad"	8 December 2023

=== Season 5 (2025) ===
No. overall	No. in season	Title	Original release date
31	1	"Konnichiwa Japón"	26 September 2025
32	2	"Memorias de dos geishas"	26 September 2025
33	3	"Romanceando en Kioto"	26 September 2025
34	4	"Derbez Kart"	3 October 2025
35	5	"Sumo en calzones"	3 October 2025
36	6	"Sayonara Japón"	10 October 2025
37	7	"El último sake"	10 October 2025

== Production ==
On 4 December 2020, the series was renewed for a second season and premiered on 20 May 2021. On 20 May 2022, Eugenio Derbez announced that the series was renewed for a third season. The third season premiered on 7 April 2023. On 31 October 2023, it was announced that the series was renewed for a fourth season. The fourth season premiered on 24 November 2023.
