= Where Is Anne Frank =

2021 magic realism film about Anne Frank

- French theatrical release poster
- Directed by: Ari Folman
- Screenplay by: Ari Folman
- Based on: The Diary of a Young Girl by Anne Frank
- Produced by: Jani Thiltges; Yves Kugelmann; Ari Folman; Alexander Rodnyansky
- Starring: Emily Carey; Ruby Stokes
- Cinematography: Tristan Oliver
- Edited by: Nili Feller
- Music by: Karen O; Ben Goldwasser
- Production companies: Purple Whale Films; Walking the Dog; Samsa Film; Bridgit Folman Film Gang; Submarine Amsterdam; Le Pacte; Doghouse Films; Magellan Films
- Distributed by: Le Pacte (France); Cinéart (Belgium and Netherlands); NC (Israel)
- Release dates: 9 July 2021 (Cannes); 8 December 2021 (France); 15 December 2021 (Belgium); 16 March 2022 (Luxembourg); 31 March 2022 (Netherlands)
- Running time: 99 minutes
- Countries: France; Luxembourg; Belgium; Netherlands; Israel
- Language: English
- Budget: $20 million
- Box office: $752,750

Where Is Anne Frank is a 2021 animated magical realism film directed by Israeli director Ari Folman. The film follows Kitty, Anne Frank's imaginary friend to whom she addressed her diary, manifesting in contemporary Amsterdam. Seeking to learn what happened to her creator, Kitty attracts worldwide attention and interacts with undocumented immigrants.

Where Is Anne Frank was shown out of competition at the 2021 Cannes Film Festival on 9 July 2021. It was released in France on 8 December 2021 by Le Pacte, on 15 December 2021 in Belgium by Cinéart, on 16 March 2022 in Luxembourg, and on 30 March 2022 in the Netherlands.

== Plot ==
"A year from now" in Amsterdam, the glass casing over the first volume of Anne Frank's diaries in the Anne Frank House shatters. As ink from a fountain pen drips onto the pages, the words lift off and manifest into Kitty, a 14-year-old red-haired girl dressed in 1940s clothes who was Anne's imaginary friend while writing her diary. Confused by the absence of Anne and her family, Kitty discovers she is invisible and intangible to people while inside the Anne Frank House, where she sees civilians tour the museum. Flashbacks to Anne writing her diary in the 1940s show how Kitty remembers the recorded events as if Anne spoke to her while writing.

After dark, two drunk men smash Anne's bedroom window with rocks after seeing Kitty turn on a light, drawing the police's attention and scaring her into fleeing with the diary. Not knowing what happened to the Franks and the time since World War II, Kitty tries to file a missing person report at the police station for Anne. The police bemusedly point her to several places in Amsterdam named after Anne Frank before moving to arrest her when they learn Kitty has Anne's diary. Kitty escapes and meets a boy named Peter, whom she saw stealing wallets in the Anne Frank House yesterday, initially mistaking him for Anne's boyfriend. While skating with him, Kitty discovers how straying too far from the diary will dissolve her into ink. Peter takes her back to the Anne Frank House in the morning after Kitty nearly dies from separation from Anne's diary. After Kitty spends the day sleeping, Peter comes looking for her the next morning, leading the police to seize him for disruption. Knowing him to be a pickpocket, they interrogate him about Kitty but refuse to believe his account about her magical status.

At night, Peter returns to the Anne Frank House, explaining how he's learned how Kitty's powers work. She exits to meet him, drawing the attention of the police and forcing them both to flee again. In the morning, Kitty trades one of Auguste van Daan's stashed high-priced watches for modern clothes and visits the 6th Montessori School's library to catch up on history. After reviewing several editions of Anne's diary, Kitty learns about Anne's death from the librarian, who gives her Otto Frank's book before she attends the play about Anne. When she criticizes the actors for misquoting Anne, the audience recognizes her from the news and swarms her. Kitty escapes and meets up with Peter, who takes her to a shelter where refugees live. Awa, a little girl she had previously met at the police station, explains their plight and shows her how her father plans to build a hot air balloon for them to escape.

Kitty confronts Peter about not explaining that Anne and most of her family died. Determined to retrace Anne's footsteps, Kitty and Peter travel by train to Westerbork, Auschwitz, and Bergen-Belsen. Kitty reads Otto's memoir and watches Hanneli Goslar's recordings, becoming more depressed. Upon arriving at Anne and Margot's cenotaph in Bergen-Belsen, a devastated Kitty collapses while sobbing before Peter convinces her to return to Amsterdam together. When they return to the shelter, they discover the government has scheduled to deport the refugees tomorrow. With her new experiences, Kitty becomes empowered to help them, spray-painting their hot air balloon to reveal her location to the world.

With a crowd gathered the next day, Kitty makes an emotional speech, accusing the world of deifying Anne and mishandling her message of helping and saving people. She threatens to burn Anne's diary unless the government agrees to shelter the refugees. Seeing Kitty afraid of what could happen, Peter offers to take her back to the Anne Frank House to live as an immortal, invisible spirit. Despite her fear of death, she declines, as they have fallen in love. After a short deliberation, the officials and police accept Kitty's terms. She hands the diary to Awa, who delivers it to the authorities as Kitty leaves with Peter. After separating from Anne's diary for three hours, Kitty shares a passionate kiss with a distraught Peter before dissolving into ink and dispersing into the wind.

== Cast ==
- Emily Carey as Anne Frank
- Ruby Stokes as Kitty
- Sebastian Croft as Anne's Peter
- Ralph Prosser as Kitty's Peter
- Michael Maloney as Otto Frank
- Samantha Spiro as Edith Frank
- Skye Bennett as Margot Frank
- Tracy-Ann Oberman as Auguste Van Daan
- Stuart Miligan as Herman Van Daan
- Andrew Woodall as Albert Dussel
- Naomi Mourton as Awa
- Ari Folman as Officer Van Yaris
- Nell Barlow as Officer Elsa Platt
- Maya Myers as Sandra

== Production ==
Where Is Anne Frank was an initiative of the Anne Frank Fonds developed in partnership with UNESCO, the Claims Conference, the Foundation of the Memory of the Shoah, and various other organizations. The producers originally planned to shoot the movie entirely in stop motion, with the characters to be later replaced in traditional 2D animation. However, they ultimately used 2D animation for most of the film and used stop-motion sets for the background in some scenes.

Before the film was released, Folman and David Polonsky published a graphic novel adaptation of Anne Frank's Diary which used the same style of drawing seen in the film. The film itself was also adapted into a graphic novel by Folman with illustrations by Lena Guberman.

== Reception ==
Where Is Anne Frank has garnered a 76% approval rating and an average rating of 6.80/10 on Rotten Tomatoes based on reviews from 55 critics. The site's critical consensus reads, "Where Is Anne Frank approaches a well-known story from a fresh angle while powerfully placing it in the context of the horrific tragedy that surrounds it." Metacritic gave the film a weighted average score of 56 out of 100 based on five critics, indicating "Mixed or Average" reviews.

Peter Bradshaw of The Guardian wrote, "The story of Anne Frank and her diary is retold in this fervent, heartfelt and visually wonderful animated film." Sheri Linden of The Hollywood Reporter said the film "expresses the story's unspeakable sadness with eloquence and sensitivity." Pete Hammond of Deadline Hollywood called it "a complete Anne Frank story reinvention that should resonate in the hearts of the young audience at which it is aimed".
