= Mi tío =

- Genre: Comedy
- Based on: Uncle by Oliver Refson and Lilah Vandenburgh
- Written by: Charlie Barrientos; Aldeni Fraga; Mao Garcia
- Directed by: Javier Colinas
- Starring: José Eduardo Derbez; Ariadne Díaz; Santiago Beltrán
- Composer: Carlo Ayhllón
- Country of origin: Mexico
- Original language: Spanish
- No. of seasons: 1
- No. of episodes: 6

Production
- Executive producers: Iliana Reyes Chávez; Javier Colinas; Carla Farell; Mario Almeida
- Editor: Javier Soto
- Production company: Corazón Films

Original release
- Network: Amazon Prime Video; Pantaya
- Release: 25 March 2022

Mi tío is a Mexican comedy streaming television series, based on the British comedy series Uncle. It premiered 25 March 2022 on Pantaya in the United States and Puerto Rico, and on Amazon Prime Video in Latin America. It stars José Eduardo Derbez, Ariadne Díaz and Santiago Beltrán.

== Plot ==
Andy (José Eduardo Derbez) is a frustrated musician who is about to commit suicide because he believes his life has no direction. A call from his sister Sam (Ariadne Díaz) manages to avoid his suicide by asking him to take care of her ten-year-old son, Tadeo (Santiago Beltrán). Andy and Tadeo form a strange connection and will learn from each other's different personalities in order to form a friendship and a family.

== Cast ==
- José Eduardo Derbez as Andy
- Ariadne Díaz as Sam
- Santiago Beltrán as Tadeo
- Eduardo Yáñez as Billy
- Gema Garoa as Mia
- Michelle González as Renata
- Mara López as Sol
- Luis Arrieta as Iñaki
- Alfonso Borbolla as Carlos

== Episodes ==
No.	Title	Original release date
1	"Yo te odio más, chiquitín"	25 March 2022
2	"¿Qué quieres ser cuando seas grande?"	25 March 2022
3	"¿Cómo se llama la niña, pequeño calenturiento?"	25 March 2022
4	"¿A quién salvarías de una muerte lenta y dolorosa?"	25 March 2022
5	"No le vuelvo a abrir mi puerta a nadie"	25 March 2022
6	"Pero no fue mi culpa"	25 March 2022
