= Oscar Moore (novelist) =

British journalist and novelist

Oscar Moore (23 March 1960 – 12 September 1996) was an English journalist, author and editor of Screen International.

== Biography ==
Moore grew up in London and was educated at the independent The Haberdashers' Aske's Boys' School, going on to read English at Pembroke College, Cambridge, graduating in 1982. He worked as a journalist and critic, under his own name and various pseudonyms, to such magazines as Time Out, I-D, The Times, Punch, The Evening Standard, and The Fred Magazine (in which his novel was first serialised). He was editor of The Business of Film magazine during the mid-1980s, and joined UK film trade journal Screen International as deputy editor in 1990. He served as editor of Screen International from 1991 until September 1994 when he became editor-in-chief. Moore himself has been described as "handsome, bright, witty, and gay," and worked occasionally as a male escort in addition to his magazine work. He lived with HIV for the last 13 years of his life, and from 1994 to 1996 wrote a regular column for The Guardian entitled "PWA (Person With AIDS)." Moore lost his sight owing to his HIV infection and died of AIDS-related illness in 1996 at the age of 36.

== Novel ==
A Matter of Life and Sex was published in 1991 originally under the pseudonym Alec F. Moran (an anagram for roman à clef). It is an autobiographical novel recounting the coming of age of a gay man, Hugo Harvey, who engages in sex from a young age and later, during university, works at least part-time as a prostitute, contracting HIV/AIDS in the mid-1980s before the advent of effective anti-HIV drugs. The novel describes the protagonist's relationships with his family (most significantly with his mother), his school friends, his casual sex partners, and with friends battling HIV/AIDS.

== Legacy ==
A book collecting his "PWA" columns was published a month after his death. A stage adaptation was produced in London in 2001.

After his death, EMAP, the publishers of Screen International, created The Oscar Moore Foundation as a trust fund to support European screenwriters.

== Works ==
- A Matter of Life and Sex, 1991, Dutton, New York. ISBN 0-525-93484-7.
- PWA: Looking AIDS in the Face, 1996, Picador, London. ISBN 0-330-35193-1.
