= County Lines (film) =

2019 British film

- Theatrical film poster
- Directed by: Henry Blake
- Written by: Henry Blake
- Produced by: Victoria Bavister; David Broder
- Starring: Conrad Khan; Ashley Madekwe; Harris Dickinson; Tabitha Milne-Price
- Cinematography: Sverre Sørdal
- Edited by: Paco Sweetman
- Music by: James Pickering
- Release dates: October 8, 2019 (London); December 4, 2020 (UK)
- Running time: 90 mins.
- Country: United Kingdom
- Language: English

County Lines is a 2019 British drama film, written and directed by Henry Blake. The film stars Conrad Khan, Ashley Madekwe, Harris Dickinson, and Tabitha Milne-Price. It premiered at the BFI London Film Festival in 2019, before being released throughout the UK and Ireland in 2020.

== Plot ==
A 14-year-old boy is groomed into a lethal nation-wide drug-selling enterprise which exploits vulnerable children and trafficks them across Great Britain.

== Cast ==
- Conrad Khan as Tyler
- Ashley Madekwe as Toni
- Harris Dickinson as Simon
- Marcus Rutherford as Sadiq
- Chizzy Akudolu as Sophie
- Tabitha Milne-Price as Aliyah
- Ebenezer Gyau as Deontay
- Johanna Stanton as Izzy
- Anthony Adjekum as Laurence
- Stephen Leask as Mr. Matthews
- Carlyss Peer as Bex
- Alfie Darling as Nick
- Shauna Shim as Briony
- Michael Oku as Gabriel Normington

== Reception ==
On the review aggregator website Rotten Tomatoes, 96% of 24 critics' reviews are positive, with an average rating of 7.60/10.

Sarah Morgan of ON Magazine, who awarded the film a score of 8.7/10, applauds the film for telling "an engaging story full of compelling characters while educating us about the world at large". Peter Bradshaw of The Guardian awards the film 4/5 stars, highlighting the "excellent performances from Conrad Khan, Ashley Madekwe, and Harris Dickinson, and also Anthony Adjekum".

Guy Lodge of Variety also lauds the film for "its tangible dead-end atmosphere, sharp sense of local geography and quietly expressive performances". Demetrios Matheou of Screen Daily praises writer/director Henry Blake for "laying it all bare in his debut". Trevor Johnston of Sight and Sound also lauds Blake for creating "a distinctive stylistic context", as well as commending him for his "11 years of experience counseling teens with drug problems". And Euan Franklin of HeyUGuys rated it 4/5 stars and favorably compares the film via possessing "all the gritty minimalism and working-class politics of a Ken Loach movie".
