= The Burning Girls =

British television series

- Genre: Horror; Psychological drama Folk horror
- Based on: The Burning Girls by C.J. Tudor
- Screenplay by: Hans Rosenfeldt; Camilla Ahlgren
- Directed by: Charles Martin; Kieron Hawkes
- Starring: Samantha Morton; Ruby Stokes
- Theme music composer: Lorne Balfe; Michael Bitton
- Country of origin: United Kingdom
- Original language: English
- No. of series: 1
- No. of episodes: 6

Production
- Executive producers: Tony Wood; C.J. Tudor; Hans Rosenfeldt; Richard Talk-Hart
- Producer: Ann Harrison-Baxter
- Cinematography: Gary Shaw; Dale Elena McCready
- Editors: Eve Doherty; Joel Skinner; Mark Hermida
- Running time: 46-57 minutes
- Production companies: Buccaneer Media; VIS

Original release
- Network: Paramount+
- Release: 19 October 2023

The Burning Girls is a British psychological horror drama television miniseries based on the 2021 novel of the same name by C.J. Tudor, adapted by Hans Rosenfeldt and Camilla Ahlgren. Developed by Buccaneer Media for Paramount+, it stars Samantha Morton and Ruby Stokes, and follows Reverend Jack Brooks (Morton) and her daughter, Flo (Stokes), as they move to Chapel Croft, a place that soon reveals the dark history of its community, where ancient superstitions and distrust of strangers are quite common.

The Burning Girls had premiered on 19 October 2023 on Paramount+. The series received mixed reviews from critics.

== Synopsis ==
A Reverend and her daughter arrive in the village of Chapel Croft looking for a new start following a sudden loss. However, the sleepy village may have secrets of its own.

== Cast ==
=== Main ===
- Samantha Morton as Reverend Jack Brooks
- Ruby Stokes as Florence "Flo" Brooks, Jack's teenage daughter
- Conrad Khan as Lucas Wrigley
- David Dawson as Aaron Marsh, church warden
  - Theron Mahoney as young Aaron
- Paul Bradley as Reverend Brian Rushton
- Janie Dee as Clara Rushton
  - Bethany Monk-Lane as younger Clara
- Jane Lapotaire as Joan Hartman
- John Macmillan as Mike Sudduth, a local journalist
- Élodie Grace Orkin as Rosie Harper, Simon's daughter
- Rupert Graves as Simon Harper, Rosie's father

=== Recurring ===
- Jack Roth as Vagrant
- Mollie Holder as Merry Lane
- Safia Oakley-Green as Joy Harris
- Beth Cordingly as Emma Harper, Rosie's mother and Simon's wife
- Erin Ainsworth as Poppy Harper, Rosie's younger sister
- Charlie Hamblett as Benjamin Grady
- Sienna-Mae Miller as Abigail
- Summer Miller as Maggie
- Catherine Harvey as Judith Lane
- Charlie Price as Jacob Lane
- Aaron-Jon North as Jonathan
- Liam Hatch as Tom Harper
- Lorelei Winterfrost as Ruby

== Episodes ==
No.	Title	Directed by	Written by	Original release date
1	"One"	Charles Martin	Hans Rosenfeldt	19 October 2023
2	"Two"	Charles Martin	Camilla Ahlgren	19 October 2023
3	"Three"	Charles Martin	Hans Rosenfeldt	19 October 2023
4	"Four"	Kieron Hawkes	Camilla Ahlgren	19 October 2023
5	"Five"	Kieron Hawkes	Camilla Ahlgren	19 October 2023
6	"Six"	Kieron Hawkes	Hans Rosenfeldt	19 October 2023

== Production ==
In March 2021 it was revealed that Hans Rosenfeldt would adapt the C.J. Tudor novel The Burning Girls for Buccaneer Media. Rosenfeldt had previously worked with the company developing the television series Marcella. Rosenfeldt later revealed he was working on the adaptation with Camilla Ahlgren, with whom he had previously collaborated with on popular noir series The Bridge. The series was one of the first Paramount+ UK commissions, authorised by Sebastian Cardwell, deputy chief content officer for the UK at Paramount, in April 2022 ahead of the launch of its streaming service in the United Kingdom in the summer of 2022.

=== Casting ===
In September 2022 Samantha Morton and Ruby Stokes were announced in the cast. Announced to be joining them that month were Conrad Khan, Rupert Graves, Élodie Grace Orkin, Janie Dee, David Dawson, Paul Bradley, Jane Lapotaire, Jack Roth, Mollie Holder, Safia Oakley-Green, Beth Cordingly, Bethany Monk-Lane, and John Macmillian. The book's author C.J. Tudor posted on social media that they “could not be more thrilled that these fantastic actors are bringing my book to life”.

=== Filming ===
Principal photography on the series was reported to have started in September 2022. In November 2022 location filming was reported by local media in the Buckinghamshire village of Stokenchurch, with filming at the Stokenchurch Community Centre and on The Common. Keys scenes for the series were filmed in the Sussex countryside near Chichester, with the majority filmed in Buckinghamshire and Oxfordshire.

== Release ==
The series was released on 19 October 2023 on Paramount+ in select countries. In November 2024 it was re-released on Netflix
