= A Town Called Malice (TV series) =

British crime thriller television series

- Genre: Crime drama
- Created by: Nick Love
- Starring: Jack Rowan; Tahirah Sharif; Jason Flemyng; Martha Plimpton; Dougray Scott; Lex Shrapnel; Daniel Sharman; George Jaques; Eliza Butterworth
- Music by: Alfie Godfrey
- Country of origin: United Kingdom
- Original language: English

Production
- Executive producers: Paul Gilbert; Jane Moore; Peter Welter Soler
- Producer: Andy Noble
- Production companies: Vertigo Films; Rogue State; Sky Studios

Original release
- Network: Sky Max
- Release: 16 March – 4 May 2023

A Town Called Malice is a British crime drama television series created by Nick Love. The series premiered on 16 March 2023 on Sky Max. In April 2023, it was cancelled after one series.

== Synopsis ==
Set in the 1980s, the Lord family is past their criminal heydays, but that does not mean they do not feel nostalgic for it. Gene, the youngest of the family, feels overlooked and neglected by his family who fail to recognise his intelligence and killer instincts. After narrowly surviving a gangland battle, Gene and his fiancée Cindy flee to the Costa del Sol, Spain to evade arrest and find themselves embroiled in the local underworld, desperately trying to avoid trouble. Things heat up even further when the rest of the Lords join them on the Costa del Sol and try to reclaim their halcyon days as criminal top dogs.

== Cast and characters ==
=== Main ===
- Jack Rowan as Gene Lord
- Tahirah Sharif as Cindy Carter
- Jason Flemyng as Albert Lord
- Martha Plimpton as Mint Ma Lord
- Lex Shrapnel as Leonard Lord
- Daniel Sharman as Kelly Lord
- George Jaques as Anthony Lord
- Eliza Butterworth as Carly Lord
- Leanne Best as Detective Inspector Lindsay
- Josh Tedeku as Eddie Carter
- Dougray Scott as Uncle Tony

=== Recurring ===
- Marcelo Converti as Mayor César Cabrol
- Bruno Sevilla as Officer Alfonso
- Yassine Fadel as Metin
- Coen Bril as Luuk
- Joe Hughes as DC Davidson
- Ramiro Blas as Ernesto
- Melina Matthews as Lola
- Ana Santos as Manuela
- Sarah Shahin as Amira
- José Luis Ferrer as Diego

=== Guest ===
- Ernesto Collado as Emilio Suárez
- Paul Weller as a drinker in the bar

== Episodes ==
No.	Title	Directed by	Written by	Original release date
1	"I Want to Know What Love Is"	Jamie Donoughue	Nick Love	16 March 2023
Gene Lord, the youngest son of the Lord criminal family, begins a relationship with Cindy Carter. Gene introduces Cindy to the rest of the Lords and proposes marriage to Cindy. However, an attack by rival gangs prompts patriarch Albert to send Gene and several other family members to a showdown. The brawl ends with Gene being arrested, but Cindy saves him by running over the police officer arresting him. To escape, Gene and Cindy are sent to the Costa del Sol under the protection of Albert's brother Tony. Upon arriving, Tony brags about the hospitality empire he has built. Gene learns that the police officer has died, yet refuses to abandon Cindy. As tensions arise between Tony and Cindy, she and Gene learn Tony has been lying about his empire and is really a nightclub entertainer. Tony's property ambitions are being frustrated by a landowner named Ernesto, so Gene and Cindy propose a deal with Ernesto to partner in developing Tony's planned hotel. A meeting to discuss the deal turns into a gun battle, with Tony shooting Ernesto and his thugs. Cindy takes the opportunity to murder Tony, and she claims to Gene that Ernesto killed him. Gene steals Ernesto's deeds. A Metropolitan Police unit, led by DI Lindsay, is formed to bring the Lords to justice, and they discover no official record of anyone named Cindy Carter.
2	"Daddy Cool"	Jamie Donoughue	Nick Love	23 March 2023
The local police, led by Detective Alfonso, investigate the shootout at Ernesto's. Gene and Cindy are interviewed by Alfonso, and they lie about the circumstances of their involvement with Tony. With the property deeds, the couple plan to secretly take over the development of the hotel. Gene informs the Lords about Tony, and a devastated Albert arrives with Gene's mother Mint Ma, brother Leonard and sister-in-law Carly for the funeral. Despite Gene and Cindy's intention for the visit to be brief, Mint Ma sees an opportunity to expand operations to Spain. Luuk and Metin, former associates of Tony, plan an armed robbery to retrieve the deeds. Alfonso reveals Ernesto was found gravely wounded rather than dead. With their plans in jeopardy, Cindy visits Ernesto to try and negotiate a deal. However, Ernesto attacks her, forcing Cindy to smother him to death. Albert plans to sell Tony's assets, forcing Gene to admit Tony's lies, enraging Albert. As the Lords prepare to leave, Luuk and Metin take them hostage, demanding the deeds. The Lords overpower them and then find the deeds, foiling Gene and Cindy's secret plan. Ma grows suspicious of Cindy, having discovered a postcard addressed to an unknown man in her luggage. Ma tasks Kelly, Gene's other brother back in London, with tracking down Cindy's mystery man. Later that night, Alfonso arrests Gene for Ernesto's murder.
3	"Two Tribes"	Jamie Donoughue	Melissa Bubnic	30 March 2023
Kelly sells the Lord’s remaining assets in London whilst being covertly monitored by DI Lindsay. Simultaneously investigating Eddie Smith, the mysterious connection to Cindy, Kelly breaks into Eddie’s apartment but is overpowered by him. Eddie, a 16-year-old, reveals Cindy is his mother. Before leaving for Spain, Kelly robs Barney, a rival criminal, but is caught by Lindsay. Eddie frees him and the two escape together, the consequences of which cause Lindsay to be suspended from duty. The police also discover Cindy’s real identity is Mercy Wynters, a convict on the run for a previous firearms offence. Back in Spain, Gene is released from custody as the police do not have enough evidence. Albert is keen to sell Tony’s land and use the proceeds to fund a return to the London underworld. Gene convinces the Lord’s to go ahead with Tony’s hotel idea, and the family goes to meet with the Gitanos, a local traveller group, to convince them to move off the land. When Gitano Sr sensually dances with Ma, Albert snaps and threatens the community. The next day, Cindy manipulates Albert into assassinating Gitano Sr but removes the bullets from his gun beforehand. The attempt fails, and Albert brutally beats Leonard, as he’d supplied the gun. Ma threatens to leave Albert unless he snaps out of his sullen moods. Together, Gene and Albert attempt to barter with Gitano Sr, but he rejects their offer of partnership and a hotel.
4	"Let's Go All The Way"	Joasia Goldyn	Melissa Bubnic & Matt Evans	6 April 2023
The Gitanos rob Luuk and Metin of their drug shipment at gunpoint, further heightening tensions. In the aftermath of Albert’s failed attempt to kill Gitano Sr, the Gitanos confront Cindy and Gene, who strike a deal with them to partner on the hotel project and fund it by selling their newly acquired drugs. Simultaneously, Cindy and Gene bring Luuk and Metin into the project, given their connections to Moroccan drug networks. Kelly arrives with Eddie accompanying him, surprising Cindy. The revelation that Cindy lied about having a son causes Gene to pull away from her. At a meeting between the Moroccans, Gene overrules Kelly, angering him. Meanwhile, Len tries and fails to bribe Mayor Cesar to support the project. Cindy decides to send Eddie back to the UK, causing him to admonish her. During a drug exchange between the Dutch, Moroccans, Lords and Gitanos, the police nearly catches them in the act but are saved by Cindy’s quick thinking. That evening, Cindy and Gene reconcile, as do Cindy and Eddie. Cindy reveals to Eddie that she plans to kill each and every member of the Lord family.
5	"Cruel Summer"	Joasia Goldyn	John Jackson	13 April 2023
A decade previously, Cindy’s husband and Eddie’s father, Clarence, owes money to the Lords. Continually unable to pay, Albert, Kelly and Len firebomb the family home, wounding Eddie and killing Clarence. After the police find Clarence’s gun in the wreckage with Cindy’s fingerprints on it, she is sent to prison for 10 years. In the present, Gene and Len travel to Morocco to negotiate a deal with Chaffik, a smuggler, for the passage of drugs to help fund the hotel. Gene is arrested for drug possession and threatened at gunpoint to reveal his contacts but does not. The officers reveal they are corrupt and working for Chaffik, in a test of Gene’s loyalty. As Len successfully negotiates a deal with Mayor Cesar to support the hotel, Gene is granted a meeting with Amira, Chaffik’s boss. She reveals Albert has secretly negotiated to double the shipment, angering Gene. Back in Spain, Cindy replaces Albert’s antidepressants with sedatives to create an opportunity to kill him. However, she is interrupted when an argument between Eddie and Anthony, Len and Carly’s son, results in Eddie accidentally pushing Anthony over a cliff. The two attempt to dispose of his body, but Anthony comes round and attacks Eddie, prompting Cindy to bludgeon Anthony with a rock and leave him for dead.
6	"I'm Still Standing"	Joasia Goldyn	Liz Lake	20 April 2023
7	"Ghost Town"	Sean Spencer	Matt Evans	27 April 2023
8	"Living on a Prayer"	Sean Spencer	Nick Love	4 May 2023

== Production ==
In February 2021, it was announced Nick Love was developing A Town Called Malice with Vertigo Films for Sky. Sky had officially ordered the eight-part series as of the Edinburgh Television Festival in August 2021, with Rogue State having boarded the project.

The cast was announced in January 2022, including Jason Flemyng, Jack Rowan, Tahirah Sharif, Martha Plimpton, Dougray Scott, Lex Shrapnel, Daniel Sharman, George Jaques, and Eliza Butterworth.

Principal photography began in London in November 2021 before moving to Tenerife at the end of January 2022. Production on the first season wrapped in June 2022 in Tenerife.

It was cancelled in April 2023 after one series due to ratings not meeting expectations.

== Release ==
The series premiered on 16 March 2023 on Sky Max with all episodes also made available on Now. NBCUniversal Global Distribution handled international distribution.

== Reception ==
Nick Hilton from The Independent gave the first episode three out of five stars, remarking, "It is admirably unrestrained in a genre where restraint has been all the rage. It's just a shame, then, that its vivacious styling couldn't be matched by a smarter script". Lucy Mangan of The Guardian awarded the first episode three stars out of five, declaring, "In short, for those who like this sort of thing, this is the sort of thing they like. The rest of us may just need to keep taking the Sanatogen and wait for someone to wheel us into the shade for a nap".
