= County lines =

County lines can mean:

- Borders between counties
- County lines drug trafficking, the practice of trafficking drugs into rural areas and smaller towns in the United Kingdom
- County Lines (film), a 2019 film starring Ashley Madekwe
