= El roomie =

- Theatrical release poster
- Directed by: Pedro Pablo Ibarra
- Written by: Miguel García Moreno
- Produced by: Jorge Aragón; Pablo Martínez de Velasco; Guadalupe Sosa; Concepcion 'Conchita' Taboada
- Starring: Fiona Palomo; José Eduardo Derbez
- Cinematography: Juan Pablo Ojeda
- Edited by: Camilo Abadía
- Music by: Asdru Sierra; Gerald Trottman
- Production company: No Dancing Today
- Distributed by: Videocine
- Release date: January 18, 2024
- Running time: 99 minutes
- Country: Mexico
- Languages: Spanish; Mexican Sign Language
- Box office: $4,4 million

El roomie (lit. 'The roommate') is a 2024 Mexican romantic comedy film directed by Pedro Pablo Ibarra and written by Miguel García Moreno. It stars Fiona Palomo and José Eduardo Derbez accompanied by Giuseppe Gamba, Leticia Calderón, Édgar Vivar, Carlos Ferro, Irving López, Bárbara de Regil and Herlnally Rodríguez. It premiered on January 18, 2024, in Mexican theaters. The film premiered on Spanish streaming service Vix on April 11, 2024.

== Synopsis ==
Vivi is a young writer who is forced to find a roommate to pay the mortgage on her apartment. What she does not suspect is that Roy, the supposed perfect partner she found, has a peculiar lifestyle: he never pays rent. Even though Vivi discovers Ro, she decides to open the doors of her house and her life to him because her tricks lead her to rediscover herself as a writer and both she and her roommate are going to discover their real value.

== Cast ==
- Fiona Palomo as Vivi
- José Eduardo Derbez as Ro
- Giuseppe Gamba as Mauro
- Leticia Calderón as Elisa
- Édgar Vivar as Homemade
- Carlos Ferro as Julio
- Irving López as Guille
- Herlnally Rodríguez as Dulce
- Uriel del Toro as Milton
- Augusto Di Paolo as Teodoro
- Natalia Payan as Aranza
- Naia Pindas Sandoval as Teresa
- Victoria Ruffo as Tere School Director
- Bárbara de Regil as Lucía
- Ariadne Díaz as Silvia
- Marcus Ornellas
- Maite Perroni as Daniela
- Isidora Vives
- Paloma Woolrich

== Production ==
Principal photography began on November 22, 2021, in Mexico City, Mexico.

== Reception ==
In its first week, the film attracted 336,000 spectators, grossing $23.5 million Mexican pesos, placing it in first place at the Mexican box office.
