= Born to Kill (TV series) =

- Genre: Thriller
- Created by: Tracey Malone; Kate Ashfield
- Written by: Tracey Malone; Kate Ashfield
- Directed by: Bruce Goodison
- Starring: Jack Rowan; Romola Garai; Lara Peake; Daniel Mays; Richard Coyle; Earl Cave; Sharon Small; Elizabeth Counsell; Karl Johnson; Jeany Spark
- Composer: Samuel Sim
- Country of origin: United Kingdom
- Original language: English
- No. of series: 1
- No. of episodes: 4

Production
- Executive producers: Roderick Seligman; Jake Lushington
- Producer: Lucy Robinson
- Cinematography: Joel Devlin; Sam Care
- Running time: 60 minutes
- Production company: World Productions

Original release
- Network: Channel 4
- Release: 20 April – 11 May 2017

Born to Kill is a British television drama, produced by World Productions, that was first broadcast on Channel 4 from 20 April to 11 May 2017. The four-part serial stars Jack Rowan as Sam Woodford, a seemingly ordinary 16-year-old schoolboy who harbours secret psychopathic tendencies. The series also stars Romola Garai as Sam's mother, Jenny; Lara Peake as Sam's girlfriend, Chrissie; Earl Cave as Sam's only friend, Oscar; Daniel Mays as Chrissie's father, Bill; and Richard Coyle as Sam's father, Peter. The series was written and created by Tracey Malone and Kate Ashfield, becoming Malone's second original television production following Rillington Place. The series is distributed worldwide by BBC Worldwide.

The series serves as Rowan's first leading television role, having only previously appeared as a regular character in Beowulf: Return to the Shieldlands. The series achieved average viewing figures for its time slot, with 2.43 million viewers tuning in for episode one, and a slight drop to 1.74 million for episode two. The complete series was released on DVD on 12 June 2017.

== Cast ==
- Jack Rowan as Sam Woodford, a 16-year-old schoolboy with psychopathic tendencies
- Romola Garai as Jenny Woodford, Sam's mother who works as a nurse at the local hospital
- Lara Peake as Chrissie Anderson, a fellow student with whom Sam enters a relationship
- Daniel Mays as Bill Anderson, Chrissie's father
- Richard Coyle as Peter Woodford, Sam's biological father
- Earl Cave as Oscar, a schoolboy that Sam befriends
- Jeany Spark as Lauren, Oscar's mother
- Simon Bubb as Mike, Oscar's father,
- Elizabeth Counsell as Margaret Anderson, Bill's mother and Chrissie's grandmother
- Karl Johnson as Mr. Williams, a hospital patient whom Sam befriends
- Sharon Small as Cathy, Jenny's best friend and colleague
- James Greene as Bob Franklin, a hospital patient whom Sam befriends
- Lolita Chakrabarti as Helen Deverill, a psychologist who represents Jenny during Peter's parole hearing
- Pal Aron as Philip, a prison liaison officer working on behalf of Peter's parole board

== Episodes ==
No.	Title	Directed by	Written by	British air date	UK viewers (million)
1	"Episode 1"	Bruce Goodison	Tracey Malone & Kate Ashfield	20 April 2017	3.11
The arrival of new girl Chrissy triggers some alarming behaviour in apparently well-balanced schoolboy Sam.
2	"Episode 2"	Bruce Goodison	Tracey Malone & Kate Ashfield	27 April 2017	2.28
With the death at the hospital causing suspicion, Sam must tread carefully. Jenny summons the courage to face a threat from the past.
3	"Episode 3"	Bruce Goodison	Tracey Malone & Kate Ashfield	4 May 2017	2.16
When Sam exposes Jenny's dark secret her world begins to unravel. Sam comes face to face with his father and Jenny finally begins to understand her son's true nature.
4	"Episode 4"	Bruce Goodison	Tracey Malone & Kate Ashfield	11 May 2017	2.18
With Sam's father released from prison, Jenny makes a desperate effort to get to the bottom of Sam's increasingly dangerous behaviour. But is she too late?
