= Élodie Grace Orkin =

British-American actress (born 2004)

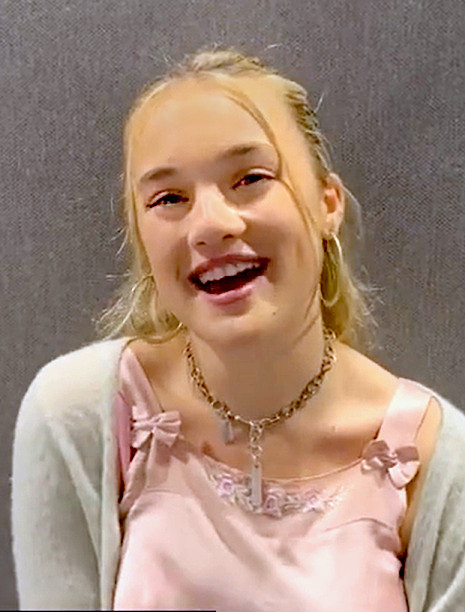
- Orkin in 2022
- Born: Élodie Grace Orkin; June 10, 2004 (age 21)
- Occupation: Actress
- Years active: 2018–present

Élodie Grace Orkin (born June 10, 2004) is a British and American actress. She is known for her roles in the fourth season of the Netflix series Stranger Things (2022) and the Paramount+ series The Burning Girls (2023).

== Early life ==
Orkin was born to an English mother, Leah, and an American father, Bill, and grew up between Los Angeles and London. She got into acting when her mother enrolled her in a musical theatre class. She took further classes at the Youth Academy of Dramatic Arts (YADA).

== Career ==
In 2020, Orkin made her television acting debut with a guest appearance in an episode of the Alibi crime drama We Hunt Together and played Kyle in the Brat web series Stage Fright. This was followed in 2021 by Orkin's feature film debut in Saving Paradise as a young version of Johanna Braddy's character Charlie.

Orkin joined the cast of the Netflix series Stranger Things for its fourth season, which premiered in 2022, as school mean girl Angela, having been inspired by the series and its lead Millie Bobby Brown in particular to pursue acting as a career. She then had a main role as Rosie Harper in the Paramount+ thriller series and adaptation of The Burning Girls in 2023. In 2025, she starred in the short film Screening Room opposite Samuel Paul Small.

== Upcoming Projects ==
Orkin is set to star in the upcoming mystery City of Life - Continuum.

== Filmography ==
| Year | Title | Role | Notes |
|---|---|---|---|
| 2018 | Jimmy Kimmel Live! | Child Singer | Episode: "Dakota Johnson/Ike Barinholtz/Tom Morello/Portugal The Man/Whethan" |
| 2020 | We Hunt Together | Penny | Episode: "104" |
| 2020 | Stage Fright | Kyle | Main role |
| 2021 | Saving Paradise | Young Charlie | |
| 2022 | Stranger Things | Angela | Recurring role (season 4) |
| 2023 | The Burning Girls | Rosie Harper | Main role |
| 2025 | Screening Room | Sofia | Short film |
| TBA | City of Life -Continuum | Chantelle Berger | Post-production |
