= Conrad Khan =

English actor

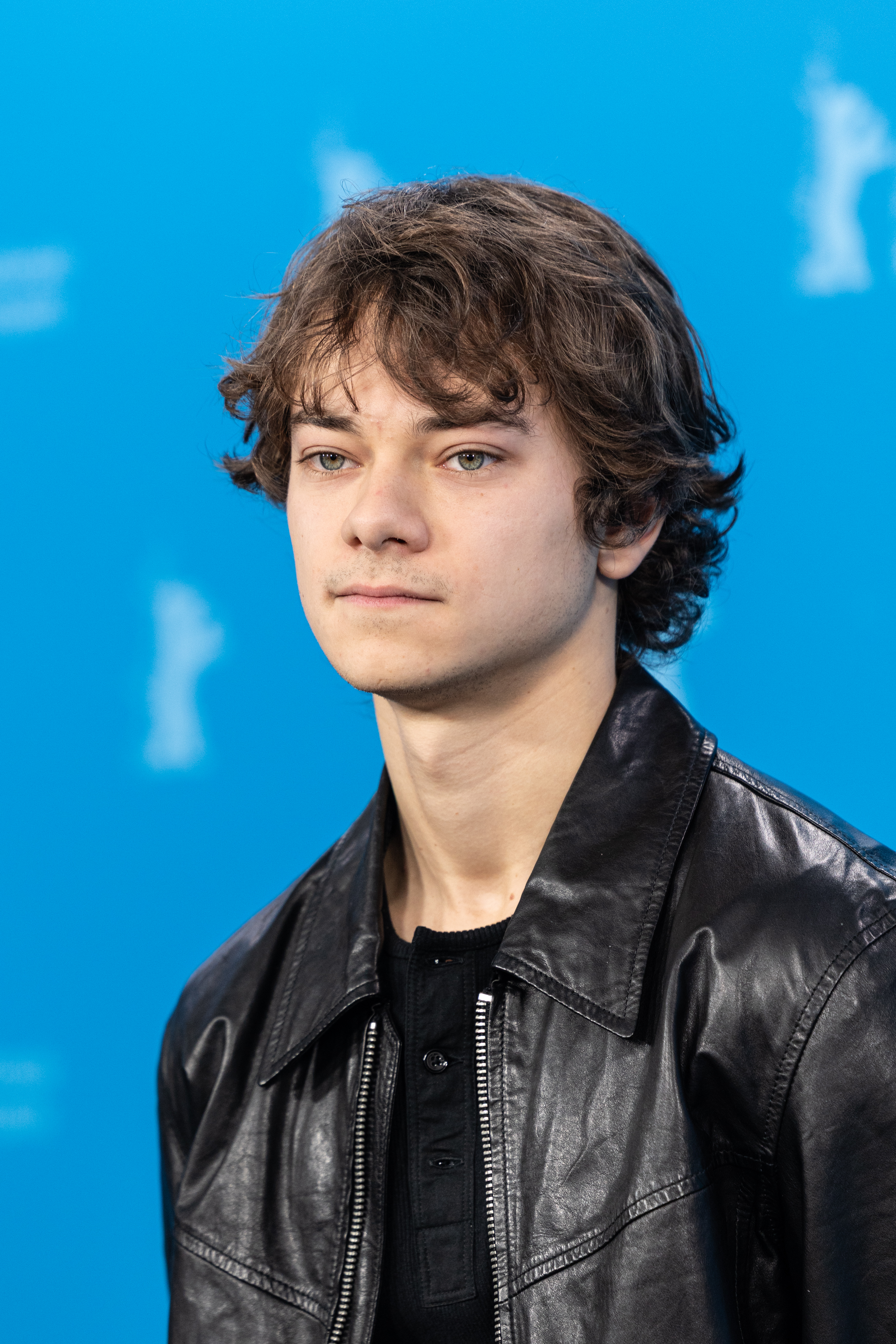
- Khan in 2026
- Born: Conrad Louis Khan; 2000 (age 25–26); London, England
- Education: Queen Mary, University of London
- Occupation: Actor
- Years active: 2015–present

Conrad Louis Khan (born 2000) is an English actor. His films include County Lines (2019), Kindling (2023), and Sunny Dancer (2026). His notable television appearances include his roles as Will Chambers in the second series of Baptiste (2021), and as Duke Shelby in the sixth series of Peaky Blinders (2022).

In 2020, Khan was named a Screen International Star of Tomorrow.

== Early life and education ==
Khan was born in North London to a half-Pakistani father and a German mother.

He attended Fleet Primary School in Hampstead and Acland Burghley School. At 15, he joined the Arcola Youth Theatre in Dalston.He pursued a degree in Film and English Comparative Literature at Queen Mary, University of London.

== Career ==
Khan made his screen acting debut in 2015 in The Huntsman: Winter's War. He was also cast in Alan Ball’s HBO musical drama pilot Virtuoso. In 2019, Khan starred as the teenage drug mule, Tyler, in County Lines, his performance in the film earned him nominations at the London Critics Circle Film Awards, the British Independent Film Awards, and the BAFTA Rising Star Award. Khan originated the role of Erasmus "Duke" Shelby in the sixth series of Peaky Blinders. In 2021, Khan was announced as part of the cast for Kindling.

== Filmography ==
=== Film ===
| Year | Title | Role | Notes |
|---|---|---|---|
| 2016 | The Huntsman: Winter's War | Young Eric | |
| 2019 | County Lines | Tyler | |
| 2019 | The Passenger | Gus | Short film |
| 2023 | Kindling | Dribble | |
| 2026 | Sunny Dancer | Archie | |

=== Television ===
| Year | Title | Role | Notes |
|---|---|---|---|
| 2015 | Virtuoso | Oskar | Unreleased HBO pilot |
| 2019 | Black Mirror | Dibbs | Episode: Smithereens |
| 2021 | Baptiste | Will Chambers | 5 episodes |
| 2022 | Peaky Blinders | Duke Shelby | 3 episodes |
| 2023 | The Burning Girls | Lucas Wrigley | Main role |
| 2026 | MobLand | Michael Cooper | 2 episodes |

== Awards and nominations ==
| Year | Association | Category | Work | Result | Ref. |
|---|---|---|---|---|---|
| 2021 | London Critics' Circle Film Awards | Young British/Irish Performer | County Lines | Nominated | |
| 2021 | British Independent Film Awards | Most Promising Newcomer | County Lines | Nominated | |
| 2021 | British Academy Film Awards | Rising Star Award | County Lines | Nominated | |
