= Marcus Rutherford =

English actor (born 1995)

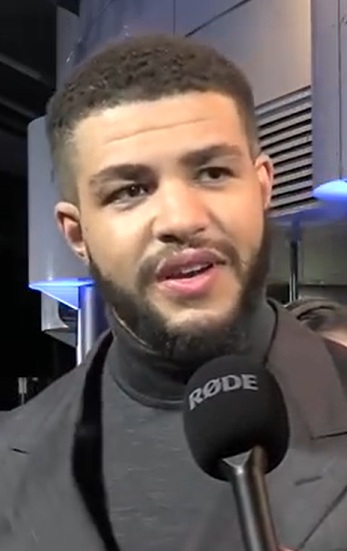
- Rutherford at The Wheel of Time London Premiere 2021
- Born: 1995 (age 30–31); Nottingham, England
- Occupation: Actor
- Years active: 2017–present

Marcus Rutherford (born in 1995) is a British actor, who received a nomination for British Independent Film Award for Breakthrough Performance for his performance in the fim Obey (2018). Other credits include Shakespeare & Hathaway: Private Investigators (2018), Bulletproof (2020), September 5 (2024), Funny Woman (2024).

His most notable role to date (2026), was as Perrin Aybara in Amazon's The Wheel of Time (2020–2025).

== Early life ==
Rutherford, who was born in 1995, and was raised in Nottingham. He trained in acting at the Television Workshop, Nottingham.

== Career ==
Rutherford started his career in the short film County Lines (2017). He took the lead role as leon in a film about the 2011 London Riots in Obey (2018). for which, he received a BIFA nomination for British Independent Film Award for Breakthrough Performance.

He had roles as Dezzy in Bulletproof (2020), as Carter Jeffrey in September 5 (2024), and as Roger in Funny Woman (2024).

He starred as blacksmith Perrin Aybara alongside Rosamund Pike in three series of Amazon's fantasy series The Wheel of Time from 2019 to 2025. Filming of the series started in 2019, in the Czech Republic and later in Morocco.

== Filmography ==
Year	Title	Role	Notes
2017	County Lines	Sadiq	Short film
2018	Shakespeare & Hathaway: Private Investigators	Lee Sandridge	TV series, episode "Ill Met by Moonlight"
2018	Obey	Leon	Film
2018	A Stitch in Time	Tony	Short
2019	County Lines	Sadiq	Film
2020	Bulletproof	Dezzy	4 episodes
2024	September 5	Carter Jeffrey	Film
2024	Funny Woman	Roger	4 episodes
2021–2025	The Wheel of Time	Perrin Aybara	Main role - 3 series, 24 episodes
2026	Crocodile	Oliver	

== Awards and nominations ==
Year	Award	Category	Work	Result	Ref.
2018	British Independent Film Awards	BIFA Award for Breakthrough Performance	Obey	Nominated	
2019	National Film Awards UK	Best Actor	Obey	Nominated	
2019	National Film Awards UK	Best Breakthrough Performance in a Film	Obey	Nominated	
2019	National Film Awards UK	Best Newcomer	Obey	Nominated	
