= Jack Rowan (actor) =

English actor (born 1997)

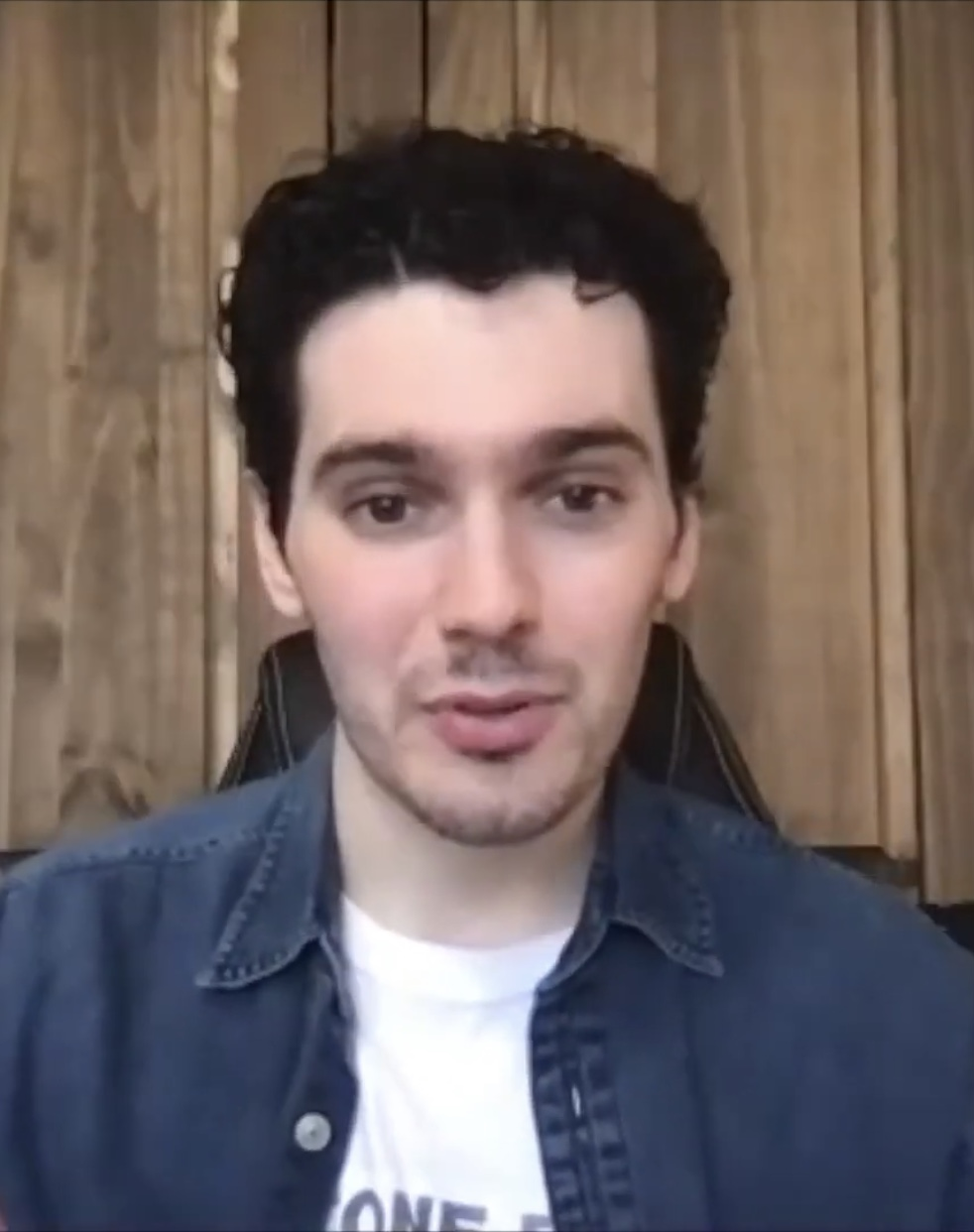
- Rowan in 2021
- Born: 18 February 1997 (age 29); Pimlico, Westminster, England
- Occupation: Actor
- Years active: 2015–present
- Television: Born to Kill; Peaky Blinders; Noughts + Crosses

Jack Rowan (born 18 February 1997) is an English actor. He was nominated for a British Academy Television Award for his performance in the Channel 4 drama Born to Kill (2017). He also starred in the BBC series Noughts + Crosses (2020–2022) and Wreck (2022), and the Sky Max series A Town Called Malice (2023). His films include Boys from County Hell (2020).

== Early life ==
Rowan was born 18 February 1997 in Pimlico, London. Before becoming an actor, Rowan was an amateur boxer from age 12, winning 18 of 27 fights. He took acting classes with RAaW London.

== Career ==
Known for his roles as Sam in Born to Kill and Bonnie in Peaky Blinders. He has also had small roles in numerous television dramas including Casualty, Silent Witness, and Beowulf: Return to the Shieldlands. from 2020 to 2022, he played Callum McGregor in the BBC drama series Noughts + Crosses.

In 2022, Rowan joined the cast of the Sky Max series A Town Called Malice, where he plays protagonist Gene Lord in a cast which includes Jason Flemyng, Dougray Scott and Tahirah Sharif.

== Filmography ==
=== Film ===
Year	Title	Role	Notes
2016	Polar Bear	Adam	Short film
2017	Trendy	Daniel	
2018	Benjamin	Harry	
2020	Boys from County Hell	Eugene Moffatt	

=== Television ===
Year	Title	Role	Notes
2015	Silent Witness	Kevin Garvey	2 episodes
2016	Beowulf: Return to the Shieldlands	Brinni	Recurring role - 12 episodes
2017	Casualty	Sheldon Hawkins	Episode: "What Lurks in the Heart"
2017	Born to Kill	Sam	Main role - 4 episodes
2017–2019	Peaky Blinders	Bonnie Gold	5 episodes
2020	On the Edge	Kems	Episode: "Adulting"
2021	Ms Fisher's Modern Murder Mysteries	Rex Carr	1 episode -Death Alley
2020–2022	Noughts + Crosses	Callum MacGregor	Main role - 10 episodes
2022–2024	Moominvalley	Moomintroll (voice)	Seasons 3–4, 25 episodes (replacing Taron Egerton)
2022	Wreck	Danny Jones	Main - 6 episodes
2023	A Town Called Malice	Gene Lord	Main - 8 episodes
2026	A good girl's guide for murder	Charlie Green	2nd season

== Awards and nominations ==
Year	Award	Category	Work	Result	Ref.
2018	British Academy Television Awards	BAFTA TV Award for Best leading Actor	Born to Kill	Nominated	
2018	BAFTA Cymru	Best Actor (Yr Actor Gorau)	Born to Kill	Won	
2018	Royal Television Society Programme Awards	Best Actor : Male	Born to Kill	Nominated	
