= Screen International =

British film magazine

- Cover of 16 February 2024 (#1951) issue, featuring Perfect Days
- Editor: Matt Mueller
- Former editors: Wendy Mitchell
- Categories: Trade journal
- Frequency: 10 issues per year
- First issue: 1889; 137 years ago
- Company: Media Business Insight
- Country: United Kingdom
- Based in: London, England
- Language: English
- Website: www.screendaily.com
- ISSN: 0307-4617

Screen International is a British film magazine covering the international film business. It is published by Media Business Insight, a British B2B media company which also owned Broadcast.

The magazine is primarily aimed at those involved in the global film business. The magazine in its current form was founded in 1975, and its website, Screendaily.com, was added in 2001.

Screen International also produces daily publications at film festivals and markets in Berlin, Germany; Cannes, France; Toronto, Ontario, Canada; the American Film Market in Santa Monica, California; and Hong Kong.

== History ==
Screen International traces its history back to 1889 with the publication of Optical Magic Lantern and Photographic Enlarger. At the turn of the 20th century, the name changed to Cinematographic Journal and in 1907 it was renamed Kinematograph and Lantern Weekly.

=== Kinematograph Weekly ===
Kinematograph and Lantern Weekly contained trade news, advertisements, reviews, exhibition advice, and reports of regional and national meetings of trade organisations such as the Cinematograph Exhibitors' Association and the Kinema Renters' Society. It was first published by pioneering film enthusiast, industrialist and printing entrepreneur E. T. Heron. In 1919 it was renamed Kinematograph Weekly, which was further shortened in 1959 to Kine Weekly.

The title was sold to British and American Film Holdings Ltd in September 1971, which merged it with rival film-trade paper Today's Cinema. It was later renamed CinemaTV Today.

=== Screen International ===
In 1975, Peter King purchased the struggling CinemaTV Today from Sir John Woolf for £50,000 (equivalent to £388,000 in 2025) and relaunched the publication as Screen International. The first issue of Screen International was published on 6 September 1975. King sold the magazine in 1989 to the International Thomson Organization. EMAP acquired it in 1993. Ascential later sold the magazine as part of a management buyout of Media Business Insight division in 2015.

Many Screen International journalists have gone on to become major industry figures, including Colin Vaines, who ran production for companies such as Miramax and GK Films, and who has produced many award-winning film and television projects.

== Screen Daily ==
In addition to its print magazine, Screen International maintains Screen Daily, a website providing a real-time view of the film industry.

== Editors ==
The editors of Screen International include:

- Peter Noble (1975–1979)
- Quentin Falk, editor (1979–1982)
- Colin Vaines, co-editor (1982–1983)
- Adrian Hodges, co-editor (1982–1983)
- Terry Ilott, editor (1983–1987)
- Nick Roddick, editor (1987–1988)
- John Hazelton, acting editor (July 1988-January 1989)
- Chris Goodwin, editor (1989-?)
- Oscar Moore (1991–1994)
- Boyd Farrow, editor (1995–98)
- Colin Brown, editor-in-chief (1998–2008)
- Michael Gubbins, editor (2004–2009)
- Mike Goodridge, editor (2009–2012)
- Wendy Mitchell, editor (2012–2014)
- Matt Mueller, editor (2015–present)

== Offices ==
Screen International has offices in London.

It has a network of more than forty correspondents around the world. It hosts conferences, including the annual European Film Finance Summit in Berlin and the UK Film Finance Conference in London.

== Oscar Moore Foundation ==
A former editor-in-chief, Oscar Moore—who was also a columnist for The Guardian and a novelist—died of an AIDS-related illness in 1996. The Oscar Moore Foundation was established in 1997 as a charitable foundation administered by Screen International. The foundation's aim is to foster new European screenwriting talent by awarding an annual prize of £10,000 to the best first draft screenplay in a genre which changes each year. A foundation patron, Emma Thompson, is an actress and screenwriter who has won an Academy Award for both disciplines.

== Screen International Stars of Tomorrow ==
Screen International produces an annual list of up-and-coming international talent, under its Stars of Tomorrow (a.k.a. Screen Stars of Tomorrow) brand. A special edition of the magazine to highlight up-and-coming talent was established in 2004 in the UK. Since 2010, Stars of Tomorrow has been curated by Fionnuala Halligan, who – as of 2023 – is the magazine's executive editor for reviews and new talent.

=== 2000s ===
Year	Category	List
2004	Actors	Emily Blunt; Noel Clarke; Benedict Cumberbatch; Rupert Friend; James McAvoy; Michelle Ryan
2005	Actors	Aml Ameen; Anna Brewster; Dominic Cooper; Lisa Dillon; Natalie Dormer; Johnny Flynn; Ruth Negga; Mary Nighy; David Oyelowo; Robert Pattinson; Eddie Redmayne; Nina Sosanya; Tom Sturridge; Natalia Tena; Jaime Winstone
2005	Producers	Alastair Clark; Rachel Robey; Mia Bays
2006	Actors	Riz Ahmed; Joe Anderson; Nonso Anozie; Hayley Atwell; Nichola Burley; Rafi Gavron; Rebecca Hall; Andrea Riseborough; Dan Stevens; Juno Temple; Jodie Whittaker
2007	Actors	Khalid Abdalla; Arsher Ali; Gemma Arterton; Ben Barnes; Matthew Beard; Lucinda Dryzek; Andrew Garfield; Rasmus Hardiker; Felicity Jones; Martin McCann; Hannah Murray; Kimberley Nixon; Tom Payne; Matt Smith; Manjinder Virk; Charity Wakefield; Kierston Wareing
2007	Producers	Anna Higgs; Gavin Humphries
2007	Writers	Peter Harness; Jesse Lawrence, writer-director
2008	Actors	Ben Aldridge; Olly Alexander; Michelle Dockery; Claire Foy; Georgia Groome; Olivia Hallinan; Tom Hiddleston; Edward Hogg; Scarlett Johnson; Gugu Mbatha-Raw; Christian McKay; Charles Mnene; Colin Morgan; Carey Mulligan; Jack O'Connell; Dev Patel; Charlotte Riley; Kaya Scodelario; Aaron Taylor-Johnson
2009	Actors	Zawe Ashton; Aneurin Barnard; Emun Elliott; Luke Evans; Holliday Grainger; Tom Hughes; Theo James; Daniel Kaluuya; Aisling Loftus; Wunmi Mosaku; Bel Powley; Ella Smith; Michael Socha
2009	Filmmakers	Richard Ayoade; Otto Bathurst; Ben Drew; Destiny Ekaragha; Sally El Hosaini; Emma Frost; Rebecca Johnson
2009	European	Valentina Lodovini; Tahar Rahim; Martín Rivas; Anjorka Strechel; Junio Valverde; Eduardo Chapero-Jackson; Jean-Baptiste Leonetti; Davide Marengo; Valerio Mieli; Mitja Okorn; Răzvan Rădulescu; Neele Vollmar; Kathrine Windfeld

=== 2010s ===
Year	Category	List
2010	Actors	Obi Abili; Aneurin Barnard; Jessica Brown Findlay; Sam Claflin; Emilia Clarke; Jack Gordon; Gwyneth Keyworth; Harry Lloyd; Iwan Rheon; Craig Roberts; Joanna Vanderham; Claire Wilson
2011	Filmmakers	Rowan Athale; Jay Basu; Charles Henri Belleville; Sebastian Foster; Stefan Georgiou; Scott Graham; Corin Hardy; Colin Kennedy; Frances Lea; John Maclean; Robert McKillop; Michael Pearce; Arjun Rose; Adam Wimpenny
2011	Actors	Sebastian Armesto; Douglas Booth; Joshua Bowman; John Boyega; MyAnna Buring; Joe Cole; Antonia Campbell-Hughes; Tom Cullen; Robert Emms; Phoebe Fox; Georgia King; Vanessa Kirby; Elliot Knight; Richard Madden; Toby Regbo; Alexandra Roach; Daniel Sharman
2012	Actors	Samantha Barks; Paul Brannigan; Lenora Crichlow; Karla Crome; Iain De Caestecker; James Floyd; Trystan Gravelle; Tom Harries; Aiysha Hart; Tom Holland; George MacKay; Nico Mirallegro; Daniel Rigby; Ashley Thomas; Elliott Tittensor; Yusra Warsama; Letitia Wright
2012	Filmmakers	Jessica and Henrietta Ashworth, screenwriters; Mahalia Belo, writer-director; Fyzal Boulifa, writer-director; Dominic Buchanan, producer; Henry Darke, writer-director; Stuart Earl, composer; Ruth Fowler, writer; Mustapha Kseibati, writer-director; Annemarie Lean-Vercoe, cinematographer; David Leon, actor-writer-director; William McGregor, writer-director; Jamie Stone, writer-director; Kibwe Tavares, writer-director; Daniel Wolfe, writer-director
2013	Actors	Raffey Cassidy; Antonia Clarke; Rosie Day; Franz Drameh; Cush Jumbo; Matt Kane; Malachi Kirby; Dimitri Leonidas; Rose Leslie; Stacy Martin; Freya Mavor; Bill Milner; Luke Newberry; James Norton; Chloe Pirrie; Will Poulter; Ed Skrein; Rebecca Reid
2014	Actors	Jamie Blackley; Olivia Cooke; Sophie Cookson; McKell David; Calvin Demba; Aimee-Ffion Edwards; Taron Egerton; Aisling Franciosi; Mia Goth; Kevin Guthrie; Edward Holcroft; Sam Keeley; Jack Lowden; Kate Phillips; Eleanor Tomlinson; Callum Turner; Maisie Williams
2014	Filmmakers	Michael Berliner; Sarah Brocklehurst; Keri Collins; Daniel Fajemisin-Duncan and Marlon Smith; Chris Foggin; Aneil Karia; Dawn King; Lynsey Miller; Roberto Oliveri; Simon Stephenson; Phoebe Waller-Bridge; Krysty Wilson-Cairns
2015	Actors	Adelayo Adedayo; Joe Alwyn; Ellie Bamber; Jessica Barden; Bebe Cave; Nicholas Galitzine; Ben Hardy; Charlie Heaton; Billy Howle; Osy Ikhile; Barry Keoghan; Alex Lawther; Faye Marsay; Naomi Scott; Charlotte Spencer; Brian Vernel
2015	Filmmakers	Ben Aston; Farhana Bhula; Andy Brunskill; Charlie Covell; Marnie Dickens; Daniel Emmerson; Rick Galazka; Aleem Khan; Dan Kokotajlo; Emily Morgan; Matthew Orton; Nick Rowland; Oscar Sharp; Rachna Suri; Jorn Threlfall; Joy Wilkinson
2016	Actors	Anthony Boyle; Morfydd Clark; Jodie Comer; Sope Dirisu; Barney Harris; Leah Harvey; Hannah John-Kamen; Sennia Nanua; Arnold Oceng; Josh O'Connor; Florence Pugh; Tom Taylor; Fionn Whitehead; Molly Windsor; Eleanor Worthington Cox
2016	Filmmakers	Yaw Basoah; Fodhla Cronin O'Reilly; Toby Fell-Holden; Kate Herron; Brady Hood; Melissa Iqbal; Billy Lumby; Joe Murtagh; Eva Riley; Len Rowles; Chris Urch; Rob Watson; Sam Yates
2017	Actors	Naomi Ackie; Jade Anouka; Jessie Buckley; Michaela Coel; Harris Dickinson; Paapa Essiedu; Patrick Gibson; Tom Glynn-Carney; James Harkness; Seana Kerslake; Archie Madekwe; Fionn O'Shea; Sam Otto; Sophie Reid; Connor Swindells; Olivia Vinall
2017	Filmmakers	Farah Abushwesha; Anwar Boulifa; Loran Dunn; Ed Lilly; Nathaniel Martello-White; Sarmad Masud; Harry Michell; Rungano Nyoni; Rubika Shah; Rory Alexander Stewart; Remi Weekes; Leanne Welham; Kat Wood
2018	Actors	Antonio Aakeel; Niamh Algar; Rhianne Barreto; Charly Clive; Esmé Creed-Miles; Erin Doherty; Patsy Ferran; Liv Hill; Dafne Keen; Erin Kellyman; Laurie Kynaston; Tamara Lawrance; Joseph Quinn; Marli Siu; Edwin Thomas; Jamael Westman
2018	Filmmakers	Koby Adom; Baff Akita; Amrou Al-Kadhi; Ameenah Ayub Allen; Prano Bailey-Bond; Gabriel Bisset-Smith; Anna Blandford; Hania Elkington; Rose Glass; Anna Griffin; Moin Hussain; Johnny Kenton; Harry Lighton; Helen Simmons
2019	Actors	Sam Adewunmi; Anson Boon; Dixie Egerickx; Jordanne Jones; Viveik Kalra; Synnove Karlsen; Vicky Knight; Emma Mackey; James McArdle; Himesh Patel; Chance Perdomo; Nabhaan Rizwan; Rose Williams
2019	Filmmakers	Chris Andrews; Benjamin Bee; Dionne Edwards; Fiona Lamptey; Nadia Latif; Phillip Morgan; Claire Oakley; Rapman; Alice Seabright

=== 2020s ===
Year	Category	List
2020	Actors	Helen Behan; Anya Chalotra; Sheyi Cole; Emma Corrin; Daisy Edgar-Jones; Ncuti Gatwa; Max Harwood; Conrad Khan; Paul Mescal; Yasmin Monet Prince; Dónall Ó Héalai; Tanya Reynolds; Jack Rowan; Amarah-Jae St. Aubyn; Micheal Ward
2020	Filmmakers	Rienkje Attoh, producer; Akinola Davies Jr., writer-director; Colum Eastwood, writer-director; Joy Gharoro-Akpojotor, producer; Ella Glendining, writer-director-actor; Matilda Ibini, writer; Naqqash Khalid, writer-director; Declan Lawn, Adam Patterson, writer-directors; Courttia Newland, writer; Jayisha Patel, writer-director; Charlotte Regan, writer-director; Tom Wood, producer
2021	Actors	Jonathan Ajayi; Kosar Ali; Bukky Bakray; Jake Davies; Thomas Doherty; Amir El-Masry; Daryl McCormack; Lola Petticrew; Aaron Pierre; Bella Ramsey; Ann Skelly; Thalissa Teixeira; Ellora Torchia; Anjana Vasan
2021	Filmmakers	Raine Allen-Miller; Sorcha Bacon; Andrew Cumming; Thomas Hardiman; Edem Kelman; Sophie Littman; Molly Manning Walker; Nida Manzour; Sam Steiner; Chi Thai; Sam Tipper-Hale
2021	Actors and filmmakers	Sheila Atim; Genevieve Barr; Adura Onashile
2021	Heads of department	Heather Basten; Olan Collardy; Gini Godwin; Grace Snell; Claire Anne Williams
2022	Actors	Lauryn Ajufo; Lizzie Annis; Siobhán Cullen; Hazel Doupe; Yasmin Finney; Jamie Flatters; Jacob Fortune-Lloyd; Isis Hainsworth; Priya Kansara; Rosy McEwen; Solly McLeod; Ambika Mod; Jorden Myrie; Louis Partridge; Harry Trevaldwyn
2022	Filmmakers	Ayo Akingbade; Michelle Antoniades; Luna Carmoon; Helen Gladders; Ruth Greenberg; George Jaques; Runyararo Mapfumo; Cleona Ní Chrualaoi; John Ogunmuyiwa; Adjani Salmon; Eddie Sternberg; Rob Yescombe
2022	Heads of department	Rufai Ajala; Lara Manwaring; Susanne Salavati; Lucie Red; Anna Rhodes; Cobbie Yates
2023	Actors	Marisa Abela; Ronke Adekoluejo; Samuel Bottomley; Kit Connor; Emily Fairn; Bilal Hasna; Arthur Hughes; Natey Jones; David Jonsson; Mia McKenna-Bruce; Stephen McMillan; Safia Oakley-Green; Amaka Okafor; Posy Sterling; Ruby Stokes; Leo Woodall; Sky Yang
2023	Filmmakers	Tasha Back; Nathan Bryon and Tom Melia; Joseph Charlton; Clare-Louise English and Jo Sargeant; Nadia Fall; Jack Benjamin Gill; Danielle Goff; Claire McCabe; Adeyemi Michael; Nathalie Pitters; Sandhya Suri; Nour Wazzi
2023	Actors and filmmakers	Rory Fleck Byrne
2024	Actors	Tosin Cole; Spike Fearn; Josh Finan; Lucy Halliday; Florence Hunt; Saura Lightfoot-Leon; Francis Lovehall; Jay Lycurgo; Sade Malone; Niamh Moriarty; Agnes O'Casey; Alison Oliver; Jason Patel; Mica Ricketts; Mia Tharia
2024	Filmmakers	Isla Badenoch; Miriam Battye; James Bowsher; Jess Bray; Abdou Cissé; Thea Gajić; Solomon Golding; Jess Kohl; Iggy London; Elizabeth Rufai and Abiola Rufai-Awojide; James Watson
2024	Actors and filmmakers	Richard Gadd
2025	Actors	Finn Bennett; Peter Claffey; Owen Cooper; Jade Croot; Izuka Hoyle; Emma Laird; Bella Maclean; Kieron Moore; Tut Nyuot; Daniel Quinn-Toye; Sadie Soverall
2025	Filmmakers	Shalini Adnani; Matty Crawford; Ted Evans; Sami Ibrahim; Tobi Kyeremateng; Warda Mohamed; Jess O'Kane; Anna Snowball; Liam White
2026	Actors	Bo Bragason; Galaxie Clear; Sekou Diaby; Leisa Gwenllian; Isla Johnston; Jonathan Jules; David McKenna; Cal O'Driscoll; Mitchell Robertson; Rosie Sheehy
2026	Filmmakers	Yasmin Afifi; Fateme Ahmadi; Dorothy Allen-Pickard; Hollie Bryan; Eoin Doran; Luis Hindman; Bertil Nilsson; Theo Rhys; Jonathan Schey; Katie Sinclair

== Competition ==
The magazine's international competitors include its American counterparts Variety,The Hollywood Reporter and Deadline.

== See also ==
- List of film periodicals
