= Nick Helm =

English comedian, actor, and musician (born 1980)

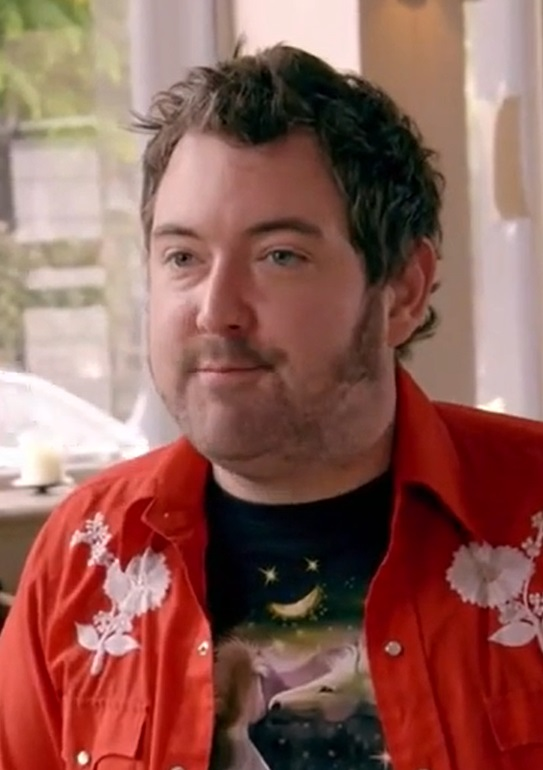
- Helm in 2017
- Born: Nicholas Tristan Phillip Helm; 1 October 1980 (age 46); West Smithfield, England
- Notable work: Uncle; 8 Out of 10 Cats; Loaded; "Nick Helm's Heavy Entertainment"

Comedy career
- Years active: 2005–present
- Medium: Television; stand-up; music
- Subjects: British culture; Relationships; Human interaction
- Website: nick-helm.co.uk

Nicholas Tristan Phillip Helm (born 1 October 1980) is an English comedian and actor. His routines have been described as "brash and bullish". Many of his performances begin with him acting calmly and see him gradually getting more and more enraged about what he is talking about. He came to prominence following the success of his 2010 Edinburgh Fringe show Keep Hold of the Gold. In 2014, Helm made his main acting debut as lead character Andy in the BBC Three sitcom Uncle.

== Early life ==
Helm was born in Barts Hospital in West Smithfield, London, and raised in Finsbury Park, until the age of 8 when he then moved to St Albans, Hertfordshire. He attended Cunningham Hill Primary School, after which he went to Sandringham Secondary School. Following this he attended the University of Winchester.

While at secondary school Helm began writing and performing. In 1997, when he was in sixth form, his drama teacher Louise Howes brought the school's production of Romeo and Juliet to the Edinburgh Festival. Helm played the part of Prince Escalus.

== Career ==
With friends, Helm began taking shows to the Edinburgh Fringe Festival in the early 2000s with increasing levels of success.

By 2007, Helm began performing solo stand-up, but also maintained his theatrical work with a 2008 Fringe show called I Think You Stink, which gained critical acclaim. Comedian Richard Herring called it a "lovely little hidden gem... funny, silly and slightly chilling... something very new and special".

Helm has worked closely with his friends on the stand-up circuit, performing mixed bill stand-up shows at the Fringe before his first fully solo show, Keep Hold of the Gold, in 2010.

In 2011, the follow-up, Dare to Dream, saw him nominated for the Fosters best comedy show and a joke lifted from the show won Dave's award for the funniest joke of the 2011 Edinburgh Fringe: "I needed a password eight characters long so I picked Snow White and the Seven Dwarves".

In 2012, Helm appeared regularly on the BBC Three series Live at the Electric performing songs with backing band, The Helmettes. There were further TV appearances on 8 Out of 10 Cats (including as Santa in the 2012 Christmas Special) and its spin-off 8 Out of 10 Cats Does Countdown (on which he has a recurring skit where he repeatedly fails to woo the show's lexicographer, Susie Dent), The Boyle Variety Performance, Russell Howard's Good News and a new show for Edinburgh, This Means War.

His 2013 Edinburgh Fringe show, One Man Mega Myth, strongly referenced Evel Knievel, and he was again nominated for Best Show in the Edinburgh Comedy Awards, losing out to Bridget Christie.

Helm won the South Bank Sky Arts "The Times Breakthrough Award" on 27 January 2014.

Helm also plays guitar and sings. He has so far released three full studio albums, as well as two live shows, and the Soundtrack to the BBC Three sitcom Uncle. His latest album is called Down 'n' Dirty:Volume 1, released on 14 August 2026. He performed "He Makes You Look Fat", one of the tracks from his album Hot 'n' Heavy, when he appeared as the stand-up guest on Russell Howard's Good News in 2012.

In 2014, Helm started playing the lead role of Andy in the BBC Three sitcom Uncle. The show was written by Oliver Refson, and featured songs written and performed by Helm and his band. The third and final series of Uncle was screened in January–February 2017.

Helm's comedy/music show Nick Helm's Heavy Entertainment broadcast on BBC Three in May–June 2015.

In 2015, Helm co-wrote and co-starred with Esther Smith in an episode of the BBC Three online series of short stories, Funny Valentines. The episode, titled "Elephant", was nominated for a Short Film BAFTA Award in 2016.

In mid-2017, Helm starred in the sitcom Loaded (Channel 4), about a group of IT entrepreneurs who become millionaires when their company is bought out, and in the food comedic documentary Eat Your Heart Out with Nick Helm (Dave). He also performed Work in Progress shows at the Edinburgh Festival Fringe.

In 2020, during the COVID-19 pandemic lockdown, he starred in the online comedy series Angry Quiz Guy.

In August 2021, he starred as a guest on the Cheapshow podcast with fellow comedian Nathaniel Metcalfe.

In August 2026, he returned to the Edinburgh fringe with his band for Nick Helm's Down 'N' Dirty Weekend performing songs from his then upcoming album Down 'N' Dirty

== Filmography ==
=== Television ===
As actor

Year	Title	Role	Notes
2010	Big Babies	Major Moustache (voice)	13 episodes
2012–2017	Uncle	Andy	20 episodes
2013	The Day They Came to Suck Out Our Brains!	Ringer	1.10 "Mankind Strikes Back"
2014	Santageddon	Nick Pliskin	Short film
2014	The Milkman	Customer	Short film
2015	Funny Valentines: Elephant	Him	Short film; also writer
2015	The Girl in the Dress	Rob	Short film
2016	Hell's Garden	Spade Man	Short film
2017	Loaded	Watto	8 episodes
2018	Nick Helm: The Killing Machine	Sam Miller	Short film
2018	The Reluctant Landlord	Lemon	13 episodes
2018	Roast Battle	Santa Claus	2.06 "Christmas Special"
2021	Intelligence	Fin	1 episode
2024	EastEnders	Ostrich Man	1 episode
2025	Father Brown	Charlie Chumley	1 episode

As himself

Year	Title	Role	Notes
2010	Russell Howard's Good News	Himself	3.07 "Episode: 2 December 2010"
2011	Show & Tell	Himself	1.03 "Maeve Higgins, Elis James and Nick Helm"; 1.05 "Diane Morgan, Josh Widdicombe and Nick Helm"
2011	So This Is Christmas!	Himself	Television special
2012–2013	8 Out of 10 Cats	Himself / Santa Claus	6 episodes
2012	Live at the Electric	Himself	8 episodes
2012	Nick Helm Solid Gold Super Hits	Himself	Television miniseries
2012	The Boyle Variety Performance	Himself	Television special
2012	The 50 Funniest Moments of 2012	Himself	Television special
2013	'8 Out of 10 Cats' Does 'Deal or No Deal'	Himself	Television special
2013–2021	8 Out of 10 Cats Does Countdown	Dictionary Corner Guest / Himself	8 episodes
2013	BBC Comedy Feeds	Himself	2.02 "Nick Helm's Heavy Entertainment"
2014, 2017–2018, 2024, 2025	Sunday Brunch	Himself (guest)	1.96 "Episode: 26 January 2014", 7 episodes (2017-2018), Episode: 21 January 2024; Episode 29 June 2025
2014	Sweat the Small Stuff	Himself	2 episodes
2015	30 Greatest Disaster Movies	Himself	Television documentary
2015	Alan Davies: As Yet Untitled	Himself (panelist)	3.01
2015	Greatest Sci-Fi Movies	Himself	Television documentary
2015	Live at the Apollo	Himself	11.06 "Episode: 14 December 2015"
2015	Mastermind	Himself (contestant)	Celebrity Mastermind 2015/16: "Episode 6"
2016	Drunk History	Himself	2.09 "Episode Nine"
2018	Roast Battle	Himself	1.02 "Episode: 16 January 2018"
2018	How The Young Ones Changed Comedy	Himself	Television documentary
2021	Question Team	Guest Question Setter	Episode 1.02: 1 November 2021

=== Video games ===
Year	Title	Role	Notes
2005	X3: Reunion	Additional voices	

== Discography ==
Year	Title	Label	Format
2011	Keep Hold of the Gold	Laughing Stock Productions	CD, Download
2012	Dare to Dream	Redbush Entertainment	CD, Download
2013	Hot 'n' Heavy	Redbush Entertainment	Download
2013	Hot 'n' Heavy	Glorious Management	CD
2013	Uncle: The Songs	Baby Cow Productions	CD, Download
2015	Nick Helm's Single For Christmas	Redbush Entertainment	CD, Download
2016	Nick Helm is Fucking Amazing	Glorious Management	CD, Download
2023	Hot 'n' Heavy	Fancy Pants	LP
2026	Down 'N' Dirty: Volume 1	Rough Trade	CD, LP, Download

== Live Show Releases ==
Year	Title	Distributor	Format
2020	All Killer Some Filler	Go Faster Stripe	Download
2023	What Have We Become?	Go Faster Stripe	Download
