= Earl Cave =

English actor (born 2000)

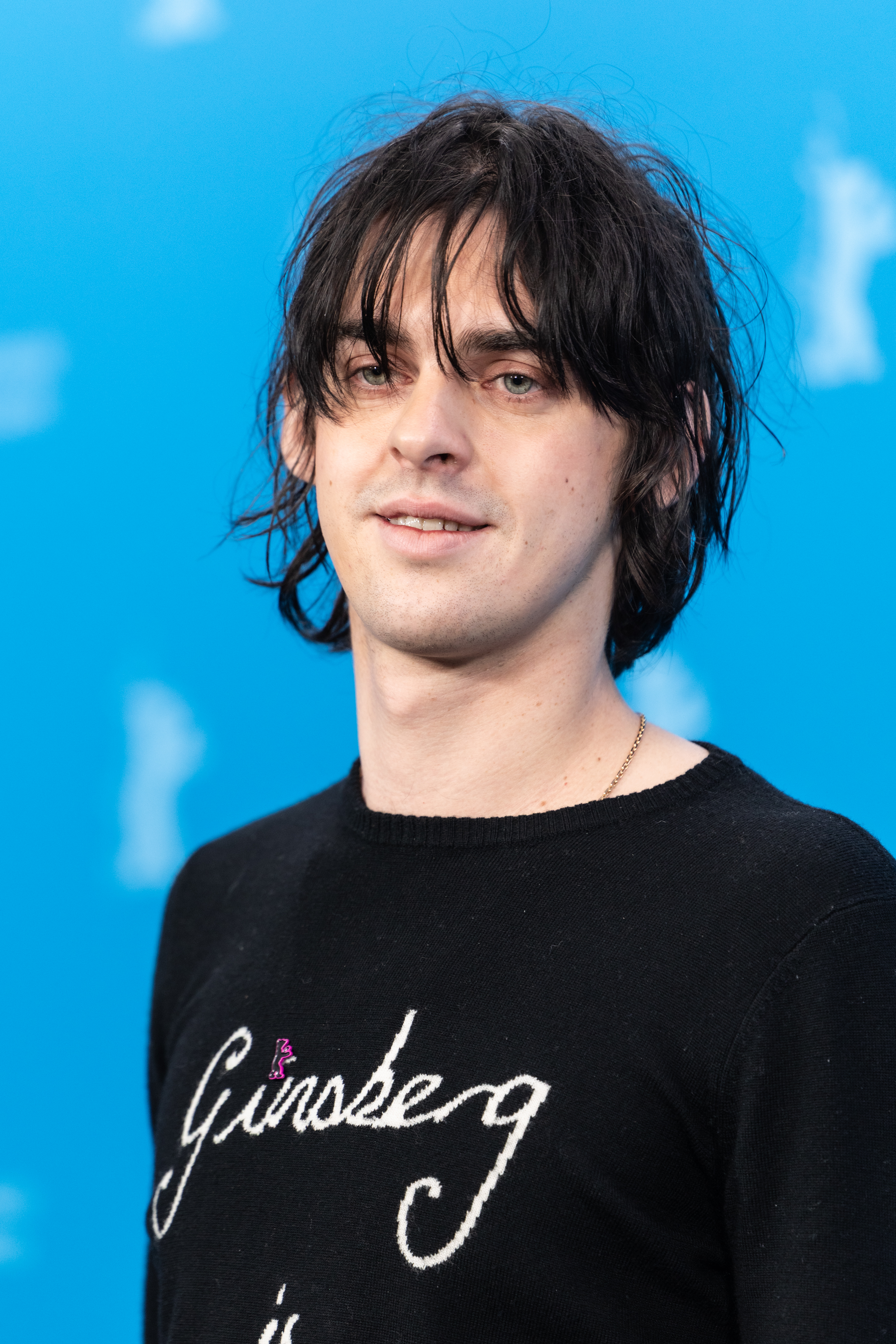
- Cave in 2026
- Born: 23 June 2000 (age 25); Westminster, London, England
- Occupation: Actor
- Years active: 2011–present
- Parents: Nick Cave (father); Susie Cave (mother)

Earl Cave (born 23 June 2000) is an English actor. His films include Days of the Bagnold Summer, True History of the Kelly Gang (2019), and The Sweet East (2023).

== Early life and education ==
Cave was born in London to Australian singer Nick Cave and English actress and designer Susie Bick. He grew up in Brighton, East Sussex along with his twin brother Arthur. He also has a half-brother, Luke. He attended Bede's Senior School where he participated in theatre. His twin brother Arthur died in a cliffside accident on 14 July 2015, aged 15. His half-brother Jethro Lazenby died on 9 May 2022, aged 31.

== Filmography ==
Key
†	Denotes works that have not yet been released

=== Film ===
Year	Title	Role	Notes	Ref.
2018	Old Boys	Betting Boy 1		
2019	Days of the Bagnold Summer	Daniel Bagnold		
2019	True History of the Kelly Gang	Dan Kelly		
2022	This Much I Know to Be True	Himself		
2022	The School for Good and Evil	Hort	Direct-to-streaming film	
2023	The Unlikely Pilgrimage of Harold Fry	David Fry		
2023	The Sweet East	Caleb		
2025	The Chronology of Water	Phillip		
2026	Sunny Dancer	Ralph		

=== Television ===
Year	Title	Role	Notes	Ref.
2017	Born to Kill	Oscar	Miniseries; 4 episodes	
2017	The End of the F***ing World	Frodo	Episode: "Episode 6"	
2020	Alex Rider	James	Season two; 4 episodes	
2021	Domina	Young Tiberius	6 episodes	
2024	Dune: Prophecy	Griffin Harkonnen	3 episodes	
