= The Chalk Man =

2018 thriller novel by C. J. Tudor

- Author: C. J. Tudor
- Language: English
- Genre: Psychological thriller, mystery fiction
- Publisher: Michael Joseph (UK); Crown Publishing (US)
- Publication date: 9 January 2018
- Publication place: United Kingdom
- Pages: 290
- ISBN: 978-1-524-76099-1

The Chalk Man is the debut novel by British author C. J. Tudor, published on 9 January 2018 by Crown Publishing in the United States and Michael Joseph in the United Kingdom. A psychological thriller set in a fictional English village, the novel alternates between two timelines—1986 and 2016—and follows narrator Eddie Adams as he revisits the traumatic events of his childhood. It won the International Thriller Writers Award for Best First Novel and the Barry Award for Best First Novel.

== Plot summary ==
In 1986, twelve-year-old Eddie and his four friends—Fat Gav, Metal Mickey, Hoppo, and Nicky (the only girl)—live in the quiet English village of Anderbury. Inspired by the town's new teacher, Mr. Halloran, the group devises a private code of chalk stick figures to use as messages, each child using their own colour to write. They nickname Mr. Halloran "The Chalk Man" because he has albinism.

At the annual town fair, a teenage girl named Elisa is grievously injured by a malfunctioning ride, rescued by Eddie and Mr. Halloran. Eddie becomes fixated on Elisa, and Mr. Halloran begins a secret sexual relationship with her. Eddie is bullied by Mickey's older brother Sean, who sexually assaults him; Mr. Halloran intervenes. Sean drowns in a local river. At his funeral, a local constable accuses Sean of having raped his daughter, Elisa's friend Hannah, who is pregnant.

A chalk figure leads the five children into the woods, where they discover Elisa's beheaded and dismembered body. Suspicion falls on Mr. Halloran, who is driven from the town and later commits suicide. The town discovers that Hannah was impregnated, not by Sean, but by Nicky's abusive father Reverend Martin. A group attacks him in his church, beating him so severely that he spends the next thirty years in a near-vegetative state.

Thirty years later, in 2016, Eddie is a teacher with a drinking problem, a habit of kleptomania, and a crush on his much younger lodger Chloe. Hoppo works as a plumber, Gav runs his parents' pub and now uses a wheelchair after a car accident, and Mickey and Nicky have been out of contact for years. Mickey contacts the group to say he plans to write a book about Elisa's murder, and all five of the friends receive letters with the chalk figure from the day in the woods. Mickey is then found drowned in the same place as Sean.

Eventually, Eddie reunites with Nicky as she reveals that Hannah left town and had a daughter, who is Eddie's boarder Chloe. Later, Chloe reveals to Eddie that Mickey had sent the letters so the group would reunite and provide material for his book. That night, Eddie discovers that Reverend Martin encountered Elisa in the woods, mistook her for Hannah, and murdered her. As he tries to kill Chloe in the woods, Eddie and Hoppo fights Reverend Martin, with Nicky finally killing him with an axe. Hoppo was Mickey's murderer; years ago, Mickey injured Gav in a drunk-driving accident, and on his return to town he confronted Hoppo with his recent discovery that Hoppo had spiked his drink. Hoppo drowned Mickey to conceal his culpability.

The novel closes with two revelations about Eddie: in 1986, he discovered Elisa's body, stole her head and other body parts, concealed them within his parents' house, and drew misleading chalk figures to lead his friend group to discover the rest. In 2016, he is showing signs of the Alzheimer's disease that killed his father, and his memory has become unreliable.

== Background and publication ==
C. J. Tudor (born Caroline Tudor) grew up in Nottingham and cites Stephen King as a primary influence. She worked in a variety of jobs before turning to fiction in her mid-thirties, including roles as a television presenter, copywriter, and dog walker. The Chalk Man was her first novel to be published, though not the first she had written.

In the United States, the novel was published on 9 January 2018 by Crown Publishing Group (ISBN 978-1-524-76099-1) and in the United Kingdom by Michael Joseph, an imprint of Penguin Books. The unabridged audiobook edition was published simultaneously with the print edition on 9 January 2018 by Random House Audio (DD ISBN 9780525526391; CD ISBN 9780525526384). It is narrated by Euan Morton, a Scottish actor.

== Reception ==
Reviews for The Chalk Man were mixed, with praise for Tudor's writing abilities, but drew some unfavorably comparisons to Stephen King's works, specially It (1986) and The Body (1982). Kirkus Reviews described it as "a swift, cleverly plotted debut novel" and praised Tudor's ability to capture "the insular, slightly sinister feel of a small village," noting that "children of the 1980s will enjoy the nostalgia." Publishers Weekly called it "a promising debut" from an author whose "storytelling prowess is undeniable," comparing its atmosphere to "the nightmarish inevitability of the Grimmest of tales." The Sun said "[Tudor] weaves a complex and captivating story in her first novel". The Irish Independent said the book "has an intriguing and creepy premise — but ultimately falls apart after a series of improbable, shading to outlandish, plot twists".

The audiobook was reviewed in Publishers Weekly and AudioFile Magazine. Publishers Weekly described it as "a dramatic rendition" of the novel. AudioFile Magazine praised the narration, noting that Morton "deftly narrates this psychological thriller as it shifts back and forth in time," portraying the young version of the protagonist "with soft vulnerability and a measured cadence" while the adult version "carries the weight of years in a hardened, sardonic voice". The review concluded that Morton's skill "lets the listener know where the story is at all times" and that "his performance grounds the disjointed plot and captures the pathos of Eddie's search for answers in his murky past".

=== Awards ===
Year	Award	Category	Result
2018	CWA Ian Fleming Steel Dagger	Best Thriller	Nominated
2019	International Thriller Writers Award	Best First Novel	Won
2019	Barry Award	Best First Novel	Won
2019	Strand Critics Award	Best Debut Novel	Won
2019	Theakston Old Peculier Crime Novel of the Year Award	Best Crime Novel	Nominated
