= Uncle (British TV series) =

British television series

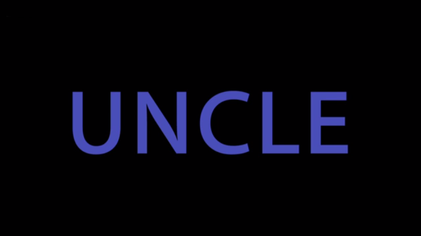
- Opening title used from Series two onwards
- Genre: Sitcom
- Written by: Oliver Refson; Lilah Vandenburgh
- Directed by: Oliver Refson
- Starring: Nick Helm; Daisy Haggard; Elliot Speller-Gillott; Sydney Rae White
- Country of origin: United Kingdom
- Original language: English
- No. of series: 3 + pilot
- No. of episodes: 19

Production
- Producer: Alison MacPhail
- Running time: 30 minutes
- Production company: Baby Cow Productions

Original release
- Network: BBC Three; BBC One
- Release: 13 January 2014 – 12 February 2017

Related
- Uncle (South Korean TV series) Mi tío

Uncle is a British sitcom written and directed by Oliver Refson and Lilah Vandenburgh. Originally broadcast between 2014 and 2017, it stars Nick Helm, Daisy Haggard, Elliot Speller-Gillott and Sydney Rae White, and features original songs by Helm.

A pilot episode was first broadcast on Channel 4 in December 2012, before the show was commissioned by BBC Three. The first episode from the series, a remake of the pilot, aired on 13 January 2014. The show was renewed for a second series, and it premiered on BBC Three on 10 February 2015. In December 2015, Helm announced on social media that the programme would return for a third and final series. It premiered on 1 January 2017 on BBC Three on the BBC iPlayer app, and was later broadcast on BBC One on 6 January 2017.

== Production ==
The show was commissioned by the BBC after a pilot was originally broadcast on Channel 4. The pilot episode aired on the channel in December 2012, as part of a strand called 4Funnies. When Channel 4's head of comedy, Shane Allen moved to the BBC, he brought the show with him. Uncle was written by Oliver Refson for Baby Cow Productions. Comedian Nick Helm explained that the show was inspired by Wes Anderson's comedy film The Royal Tenenbaums and thought it fitted in with other comedy shows produced by Baby Cow. He said that while the show was not written for him, it was 75 per cent of what he would have done himself.

Uncle is filmed on-location in Croydon. Exterior scenes have been filmed at George Street, Thornton Heath and Surrey Street Market. Interior locations include the Hustler Club and a house in Purley. Helm plays Andy, a musician who is on the verge of suicide when he finds himself looking after his quirky and weird 12-year-old nephew Errol (Elliot Speller-Gillott). Of Uncle, Helm said "There's an unconventional family at the show's core – the uncle and nephew and the single mum. They obviously are an actual family, but they create this unconventional revised family unit. That's what's nice about it."

On 17 February 2014, it was announced Uncle had been renewed for a second series. Helm said he was "gobsmacked" that he had been involved in a show that had proved popular with audiences and was looking forward to working with all the cast and crew on the new series. Allen, the BBC Comedy commissioner commented "Oli's often edgy yet warm-hearted comedy, along with Nick and Elliot's unique chemistry, have proved an instant hit with the audience and critics alike. We're thrilled to have this wayward relative in the BBC Three family." The second series went into production in late 2014 and was broadcast in 2015.

The original pilot was broadcast on Channel 4, although the following two series were broadcast on rival channel BBC Three. In a Digital Spy interview headlining actor Nick Helm discussed ways in which he believed the programme may have been different if it had remained with Channel 4. Following the decision to convert BBC Three into a digital-only channel, there was speculation that any potential third series of Uncle might be moved to BBC Two. However, in December 2015 the third series was announced by the BBC, with a strong suggestion that it would remain on BBC Three as an online broadcast, followed by repeats on BBC One.

== Cast ==
Nick Helm (left) and Elliot Speller-Gillott

- Nick Helm as Andy King
- Elliot Speller-Gillott as Errol Meyer
- Daisy Haggard as Sam
- Sydney Rae White as Gwen
- Nicholas Burns as Ben
- Esther Smith as Melodie
- Con O'Neill as Val
- Daniel Lawrence Taylor as Bruce
- Nina Toussaint-White as Shelley
- Brett Goldstein as Casper
- Jorja Rutherford as Tiffany
- Lauran Taylor-Griffin as Ruby
- Lewis Reeves as Ryan (Season 2)
- Raquel Cassidy as Teresa (Season 2-3)
- Gemma Whelan as Veronica (Season 2-3)
- Nick Mohammed as Roopesh (Season 2-3)
- Dylan Moran as Marsh (Season 3)

== Series overview ==
Series	Episodes	Originally released	
Series	Episodes	First released	Last released
1	6	13 January 2014	17 February 2014
2	6	10 February 2015	17 March 2015
3	7	1 January 2017	12 February 2017

== Episodes ==
=== Series 1 (2014) ===
No. in series	Title	Directed by	Written by	Original release date	UK viewers (millions)
1	"Mind the Cracks"	Oliver Refson	Oliver Refson	13 January 2014	0.55
Andy is an unemployed musician has to look after his nephew Errol with whom he forms an unlikely friendship. It seems that Errol is Andy's purpose in life and this stops Andy from committing suicide. Andy's bad influence encourages Errol to drink and leads the young kid to a strip club because Andy is depressed about his recent break up with his ex-girlfriend.
2	"Party Monster"	Oliver Refson	Oliver Refson	20 January 2014	0.643
Andy is embarrassed when he gets moved on while busking and then meets Gwen's new boyfriend. When he is asked to look after Errol, Andy learns that his nephew is faking an illness to get out of attending a friend's party. Andy then decides to teach Errol how to be a party monster.
3	"I Like-Like You"	Oliver Refson	Oliver Refson	27 January 2014	n/a
Andy decides to enter a battle of the bands competition held at Val's club in the hope of getting close to Gwen, and forms a band with Errol. He also helps Errol out with his romantic problems, but when Errol's date does not go well, Andy must apologise if he is to stand a chance of winning the competition.
4	"Favourites"	Oliver Refson	Oliver Refson and Lilah Vandenburgh	3 February 2014	n/a
Errol's father Ben summons the family to his home to tell them he has a new girlfriend. Andy is annoyed by the presence of Errol's other "perfect" uncle, Rex, who is good at football, is a doctor, is a great cook, and has just returned from helping under-privileged children abroad. Andy's attempts to make Errol choose between himself and Rex do not go well. Sam and Bruce share a moment.
5	"Last of the Red Hot Uncles"	Oliver Refson	Oliver Refson	10 February 2014	TBA
Errol is stuck on a boring school trip to a farm and keeps calling Andy to ask for help in escaping. Andy wants to break up with Shelly, but cannot bring himself to do it. Gwen tells Andy that Casper has left her and she admits to missing Andy. A third potential love interest, Errol's teacher, Melodie, asks for Andy's help on a school project. His attempts to juggle meetings with all three fail when they catch each other at his flat, and all three walk out on him. Later on, Gwen tells Andy that Casper apologized and they are getting back together, but Andy refuses a last-chance fling in order to pick up Errol, who has skived off the trip.
6	"Nephew"	Oliver Refson	Oliver Refson and Lilah Vandenburgh	17 February 2014	0.43
Andy agrees to watch Errol for the weekend while Sam goes on a hippy retreat. Famed music producer Mo Khan invites the pair to a party after seeing their demo, but secretly only wants to sign Errol. Errol refuses, but inadvertently takes ecstasy from Mo's office, mistaking them for breath mints. After rushing Errol to hospital and being confronted by his family, a dejected Andy returns home and decides to change his life, getting a job and apologising to his family and the custody tribunal which is meeting to decide Errol's future. Both parents are awarded joint custody; later, Errol turns up at Andy's flat, despite a restraining order, in order to spend time with his uncle.

=== Series 2 (2015) ===
No. in series	Title	Directed by	Written by	Original release date	UK viewers (millions)
1	"I'm Back"	Oliver Refson	Oliver Refson and Lilah Vandenburgh	10 February 2015	0.340
A year later, Andy and Errol are sneaking around in order to spend time with each other. Andy struggles with writer's block, so Errol tries to get him to detox his mind and body, while working on standing up to his father. Sam begins her new job as a therapist.
2	"Love Is All Around"	Oliver Refson	Oliver Refson and Lilah Vandenburgh	17 February 2015	0.445
Andy tries to convince his new lover Teresa that he is ready for a mature relationship, while Errol turns to social media to show the girl he likes that he is cool. Sam meets Ben's new girlfriend Veronica, and is surprised by how much she likes her.
3	"Last Place Hero"	Oliver Refson	Oliver Refson and Lilah Vandenburgh	24 February 2015	0.391
Andy is sick with the flu, but when Errol tells him about a song contest, they head to the recording studio. Andy refuses to let Errol play on the song, so Errol decides to sabotage the session. Andy enlists the help of Casper, Gwen and Val to get the song recorded by the deadline. Meanwhile, Sam has trouble sexting and asks for Andy's advice.
4	"7 Minutes In Heaven"	Oliver Refson	Oliver Refson and Lilah Vandenburgh	3 March 2015	TBA
Teresa breaks up with Andy. He and Sam chaperone Errol's Halloween school dance. They all agree to think before they act to avoid getting into trouble. Andy and Melodie are locked in a storeroom by Alfie, who also tries to stop Errol from receiving his first kiss from Ruby. Bruce's ex-wife Claire learns Sam and Bruce are a couple, which leads to a catfight.
5	"Frank"	Oliver Refson	Oliver Refson and Lilah Vandenburgh	10 March 2015	TBA
In need of rent money, Andy takes Errol to visit his dying maternal uncle Frank, in the hope of getting written into his will.
6	"Fight For The Future"	Oliver Refson	Oliver Refson and Lilah Vandenburgh	17 March 2015	0.340
After losing his car and facing eviction, Andy receives a cheque from the song contest and races to get the money on time. He is also tasked with keeping Errol occupied when Sam organizes a surprise birthday party for him. Melodie informs Andy that she is moving to New York and just as Andy attempts to stop her leaving, he learns from Teresa that she is pregnant.

=== Series 3 (2017) ===
No. in series	Title	Directed by	Written by	Original release date	UK viewers (millions)
1	"Father's Day"	Oliver Refson	Oliver Refson and Lilah Vandenburgh	1 January 2017	TBA
Andy's living in the basement of Sam and Bruce's new home, depressed over how things ended with Melodie and having cut off contact with Teresa after finding out she was pregnant. Now he has nightmares about the child he's never met, and it's playing on his conscience. Errol, meanwhile, is having Daddy issues of his own, unable to accept Bruce as the man of the house. This is causing Sam a headache, on top of the fact that Bruce is subtly hinting to her that he wants a baby. When Andy's offered the chance to write for a boyband, he has to decide whether financial security is more important to him than artistic integrity, especially when he has a kid in the wings. With Errol's help, Andy goes on a journey of self-discovery to find out whether he can man up and be a dad. He goes to Teresa's house, and she tells him that she had an abortion.
2	"Bringing Sexy Back"	Oliver Refson	Oliver Refson and Lilah Vandenburgh	8 January 2017	TBA
After accepting the job to write for a boy band, Andy’s finding the gig technically harder than he expected when he can’t come up with a “sexy” song. And things get competitive when Errol and Andy fall for the same girl. Meanwhile Sam and Bruce are feeling the pressure of trying to conceive.
3	"Dinner, I Hardly Knew Her"	Oliver Refson	Oliver Refson and Lilah Vandenburgh	15 January 2017	TBA
Andy stumbles into a drug-fueled whirlwind romance with singer, Jasmine, and suddenly finds himself engaged. Errol lets a girl think he’s “experienced” in an attempt to look cool, and Sam has to find a way of telling the family some life-changing news. Unfortunately, Bruce’s mother and brother are coming to visit and everyone’s struggling with whether to clear the air or hold on to their secrets. It isn’t long before the lies spin out of control and Andy has to face up to some hard truths for the first time in his life.
4	"2:27"	Oliver Refson	Oliver Refson and Lilah Vandenburgh	22 January 2017	TBA
Andy struggles to shut off his feelings. Errol struggles to let his in. Sam has breast cancer treatment in hospital.
5	"Rivals"	Oliver Refson	Oliver Refson and Lilah Vandenburgh	29 January 2017	TBA
Andy and Sam's chaotic parents, Neville and Jane, visit from Spain and announce they are going to divorce. While Sam obsesses about the fact her mother still doesn't pay her much attention, Andy schemes ways to keep his parents together in an attempt to prove he can make any relationship work. Errol decides to play Ben and Bruce off each other to buy him a trip to Europe. Who will win the manipulation game?
6	"Is This Just Fantasy?"	Oliver Refson	Oliver Refson and Lilah Vandenburgh	5 February 2017	TBA
When Melodie shows up at Andy’s flat, they finally hash it out and confess their feelings for each other. But after a night of bliss, Melodie is gone. Meanwhile, in his fantasy writing class, Errol spins a fantastical tale of Andy, now cast as a stable boy on a noble quest to find his long lost princess. With the help of a young stable master, Errol, the boys encounter a slew of odd-but-familiar faces in this fantasy retelling of Uncle, and possibly help the real Andy get to the bottom of how he can win Melodie back.
7	"The Last Assembly"	Oliver Refson	Oliver Refson and Lilah Vandenburgh	12 February 2017	TBA
Andy tours Europe for six months as part of a rock band. Errol turns 16 and forms a rock band.

== Reception ==
Sam Wollaston from The Guardian gave the show a positive review, saying "Uncle manages to be warm as well as dark and rude. And hilarious. It could well be the thing to fill the (good) comedy void since Him & Her and Toast of London ended." Gary Rose from the Radio Times gave the show a mixed review. He thought it was hard to find sympathy for Andy, while Errol was "a great little character". Rose liked the song and dance number, calling it "a satisfying injection of quirkiness."

Uncle won Best Multichannel Programme at the 2015 Broadcast Awards. The judges described it as "a truly original show with brilliant performances and great writing".

== International broadcast ==
The programme premiered in Australia on 12 January 2015 on SBS One., and also features on Australian online streaming service, Stan. Broadcast of the series was aired in Saudi Arabia and the Middle East in the summer of 2015 by BBC Entertainment on Orbit Showtime Network (OSN).

== Adaptations ==
In South Korea, local production company Monster Union (a Korean Broadcasting System subsidiary) has collaborated with Celltrion Entertainment and Hi Ground to produce a local adaptation of Uncle. It was broadcast in 2021 via TV Chosun.

A Spanish-language version called Mi tío aired on Amazon Prime Video in 2022.

== Home media ==
The first series of Uncle was released onto DVD on 16 March 2015. The Complete Collection was released on DVD in 2017. The official soundtrack album, featuring original songs by Helm, is also available from the iTunes Store.
