= Jim Norton =

Jim, Jimmy, or James Norton may refer to:

== Actors ==
- James Norton (actor) (born 1985), English actor
- Jim Norton (Irish actor) (born 1938), Irish actor
- Jim Norton (comedian) (born 1968), American comedian and actor

== Politicians ==
- James Norton Jr. (1824–1906), his son, politician in colonial New South Wales
- James A. Norton (1843–1912), U.S. Representative from Ohio
- James Norton (South Carolina politician) (1843–1920), U.S. Representative from South Carolina

== Sportspeople ==
- Jim Norton (safety) (1938–2007), American football player for the Houston Oilers
- Jim Norton (defensive lineman) (1942–2021), American football player for the San Francisco 49ers and Atlanta Falcons
- Jim Norton (rugby league), Australian rugby league footballer who played in the 1930s

== Other people ==
- James Norton (admiral) (1789–1835), British navy officer
- James Norton (solicitor) (1795–1862), solicitor, company director, farmer, pamphleteer and protectionist politician in colonial New South Wales
- James Lansdowne Norton (1869–1925), motorcycle designer, inventor and manufacturer of the Norton motorcycles
- James J. Norton (1930–2007), American labor union leader
