= José Eduardo Derbez =

Mexican actor

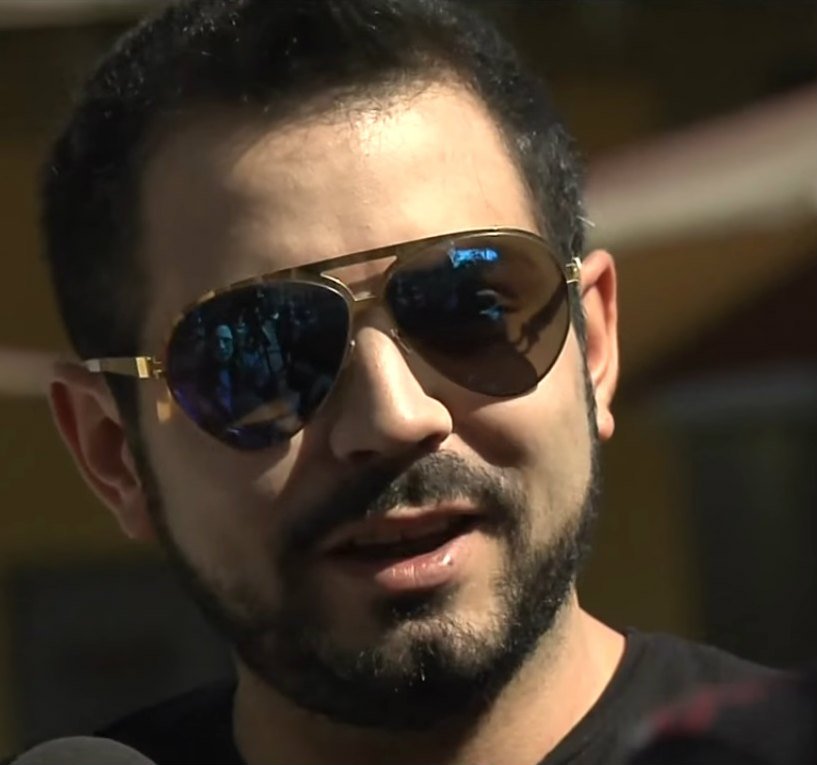
- Derbez in 2018
- Born: José Eduardo Eugenio González Martínez del Río; 14 April 1992 (age 34); Mexico City, Mexico
- Occupation: Actor
- Years active: 1999–present
- Known for: Patricio "Pato" on the show Miss XV
- Children: Tessa
- Parents: Eugenio Derbez (father); Victoria Ruffo (mother)
- Relatives: Silvia Derbez (grandmother),

José Eduardo Eugenio González Martínez del Río (born 14 April 1992), better known as José Eduardo Derbez, is a Mexican actor.

== Biography ==
José Eduardo Derbez is son of actor Eugenio Derbez and actress Victoria Ruffo, grandson of actress Silvia Derbez and nephew of the actress and presenter Gabriela Ruffo.

== Filmography ==
=== Film ===
| Year | Title | Role | Notes |
|---|---|---|---|
| 2013 | No se aceptan devoluciones | Himself | Dedicatee |
| 2024 | El roomie | Ro | |
| 2024 | Jaque mate | Molo | |

=== Television ===
| Year | Title | Role | Notes |
|---|---|---|---|
| 2012 | Miss XV: Sueña princesa | Patricio "Pato" | Television debut |
| 2013–14 | Qué pobres tan ricos | Diego Armando Escandiondas | Series regular |
| 2015 | Amores con trampa | Felipe Velasco | Series regular |
| 2016 | Vino el amor | León Muñoz Estrada | Series regular |
| 2019 | Cita a ciegas | Ricardo | Guest star |
| 2019–2025 | De viaje con los Derbez | Himself | Reality series |
| 2020–2023 | Renta congelada | Nico Ramos | Main role (seasons 3–4); Recurring (season 5) |
| 2022 | Mi tío | Andy | Main role |
| 2022 | Tal para cual | Tatú | Episode: "El tatuaje fantasma" |
| 2025 | Par de idiotas | Himself | Reality series |
| 2025 | Vecinos | Eulalio López | Episode: "El sobrino Eulalio" |
| 2026 | Hotel todo incluido | Sebastián Martínez | Main role |
