= Ruby Stokes =

English actress (born 2000)

- Stokes in 2026
- Born: 4 September 2000 (age 26); Hackney, London, England
- Occupation: Actress
- Years active: 2010–present

Ruby Stokes (born 4 September 2000) is an English actress. Her films include Una (2016), Rocks (2019), A Banquet (2021), Madfabulous (2026), and Sunny Dancer (2026). On television, she is known for her roles in the Netflix series Lockwood & Co. (2023) and Below (2026), the Paramount+ series The Burning Girls (2023), and the BBC One drama The Jetty (2024). She also played Francesca in the first two seasons of the Netflix series Bridgerton (2020–2022).

In 2023, Stokes was named a Screen International Star of Tomorrow.

== Early life ==
Stokes is from Hackney, east London. She has two younger brothers Clement and Seth, who appeared in the ITV series Angela Black. She attended the BRIT School and took classes at the Young Actors Theatre Islington. She became a member of the London Youth Circus, part of the National Centre for Circus Arts.

== Career ==
Stokes began her career as a child actress with a handful of small television roles before making her feature film debut in 2016's Una as a young version of the eponymous character, played by Rooney Mara. She appeared as Agnes in Sarah Gavron's BAFTA-nominated film Rocks in 2019. The following year, she was cast in the recurring role of Francesca Bridgerton, in the 2020 Shondaland-produced Netflix Regency romance drama Bridgerton; Stokes left the role after two seasons due to scheduling conflicts.

In 2021, Stokes voiced Kitty in the animated film Where Is Anne Frank, and played Isabelle in the horror film A Banquet. It was announced in 2022 that Stokes would star as Lucy Carlyle in the Netflix adaptation of Lockwood & Co. and as Florence "Flo" Brooks alongside Samantha Morton in the Paramount+ adaptation of The Burning Girls, both released in 2023. Also in 2023, Stokes made her professional stage debut in That Face with Niamh Cusack at the Orange Tree Theatre. Later that year, Stokes was cast as Hannah Manning in the 2024 BBC One crime drama series The Jetty, starring Jenna Coleman. In April 2024, Stokes was cast as Ella in Sunny Dancer, reuniting with director, George Jacques, after appearing in his 2023 debut feature Black Dog. The role of Ella was specifically written by Jacques for Stokes. In August 2024, Stokes was cast as Lily in the 19th-century costume drama, Madfabulous, inspired by the life of the flamboyant British aristocrat Henry Paget, 5th Marquess of Anglesey.

In 2026, Stokes made her Royal Shakespeare Company debut in The Tempest as Miranda opposite Kenneth Branagh.

== Filmography ==
=== Film ===
Key
†	Denotes films that have not yet been released

Year	Title	Role	Notes	Ref.
2016	Una	Young Una Spencer		
2017	The Price of Time	Evie	Short film	
2019	Rocks	Agnes		
2019	White Girl	Girl	Short film	
2020	It's Going to Be Okay	Jamie	Short film	
2020	Shagbands	Chantelle	Short film	
2021	Where Is Anne Frank	Kitty	Voice role	
2021	A Banquet	Isabelle		
2023	Black Dog	Kayla		
2025	Jay Kelly	Sara		
2026	Sunny Dancer	Ella		
2026	Madfabulous	Lily		

=== Television ===
Key
†	Denotes television productions that have not yet been released

Year	Title	Role	Notes	Ref.
2010	Just William	Grumpy Girl	Episode: "Parrots for Ethel"	
2011	Not Going Out	Little Lucy	Episode: "Debbie"	
2014	Da Vinci's Demons	Amelia	2 episodes	
2018	shortFLIX	Lilah	Episode: "Nosebleed"	
2020–2022	Bridgerton	Francesca Bridgerton	Recurring role (series 1–2; 5 episodes)	
2023	Lockwood & Co.	Lucy Carlyle	Main role	
2023	The Burning Girls	Flo Brooks	Main role	
2024	The Jetty	Hannah Manning	Main role	
2026	Below	Mary Penney	Main role	

=== Stage ===
Year	Title	Role	Notes	Ref
2023	That Face	Mia	Orange Tree Theatre	
2024	Till The Stars Come Down	Leanne	Dorfman Theatre	
2025	The Habits	Jess	Hampstead Theatre	
2026	The Other Place	Issy	The Shed	
2026	The Tempest	Miranda	Royal Shakespeare Theatre	

=== Video games ===
Year	Title	Role	Notes
2022	As Dusk Falls	Vanessa Dorland	
