= 6th Astra TV Awards =

2026 American television programming awards

- Date: August 15, 2026
- Site: InterContinental, Los Angeles
- Hosted by: Lisa Ann Walter
- Most wins: The Pitt (7)
- Most nominations: The Pitt (12)
- Website: theastras.com

Television/radio coverage
- Network: YouTube (@TheAstraAwards)

The 6th Astra TV Awards were presented by the Hollywood Creative Alliance on August 15, 2026, with nominations announced on May 27, 2026.

HBO Max's The Pitt received the most nominations with 12, including Best Drama Series, Best Actor (Noah Wyle), Best Supporting Actor (Patrick Ball and Shawn Hatosy) and Best Supporting Actress (Isa Briones, Taylor Dearden, Katherine LaNasa, and Sepideh Moafi). Hacks and Shrinking tied for second place with ten nominations each, followed by Abbott Elementary, Beef and Rooster with nine apiece.

The ceremony took place at the InterContinental in Los Angeles and was livestreamed on the Astra Awards official YouTube channel.

== Winners and nominees ==
Winners will be listed first and highlighted with boldface.

=== Series ===
| **Best Comedy Series**: **Hacks (HBO Max)**; Abbott Elementary (ABC); Elsbeth (CBS); The Hunting Wives (Netflix); I Love LA (HBO); Margo's Got Money Troubles (Apple TV)}; Rooster (HBO); Scrubs (ABC); Shrinking (Apple TV); Ted (Peacock) | **Best Drama Series**: **The Pitt (HBO Max)**; The Boys (Prime Video); The Diplomat (Netflix); From (MGM+); Heated Rivalry (HBO Max); High Potential (ABC); Landman (Paramount+); Outlander (Starz); Paradise (Hulu); Pluribus (Apple TV) |
| **Best Limited Series**: **Beef (Netflix)**; All Her Fault (Peacock); The Beast in Me (Netflix); DTF St. Louis (HBO); The Girlfriend (Prime Video); Half Man (HBO) | **Best TV Movie**: **Remarkably Bright Creatures (Netflix)**; Deep Cover (Prime Video); Mike & Nick & Nick & Alice (Hulu); People We Meet on Vacation (Netflix); Swiped (Hulu); The Wrecking Crew (Prime Video) |
| **Best Animated Series**: **Hazbin Hotel (Prime Video)**; Family Guy (Fox); Invincible (Prime Video); Long Story Short (Netflix); The Simpsons (Fox); South Park (Comedy Central) | **Best Anime Series**: **Witch Hat Atelier (Crunchyroll)**; Dandelion (Netflix); Mao (Hulu); Rooster Fighter (Adult Swim); Sakamoto Days (Netflix); Steel Ball Run: JoJo's Bizarre Adventure (Netflix) |
| **Best Book to Screen Series**: **The Summer I Turned Pretty (Prime Video)**; Heated Rivalry (HBO Max); A Knight of the Seven Kingdoms (HBO); Margo's Got Money Troubles (Apple TV); The Testaments (Hulu); Young Sherlock (Prime Video) | **Best Game Show**: **Pop Culture Jeopardy! (Netflix)**; Celebrity Family Feud (ABC); Celebrity Jeopardy! All-Stars (ABC); Celebrity Wheel of Fortune (ABC); The Floor (Fox); Match Game (ABC) |
| **Best Docuseries or Nonfiction Series**: **Lost Women of Alaska (ID)**; Billy Joel: And So It Goes (HBO); Boy Band Confidential: A Hollywood Demons Event (ID); Mr. Scorsese (Apple TV); Taylor Swift: The End of an Era (Disney+); Tucci in Italy (National Geographic) | **Best Documentary TV Movie**: **John Candy: I Like Me (Prime Video)**; aka Charlie Sheen (Netflix); Marty, Life Is Short (Netflix); Mel Brooks: The 99 Year Old Man! (HBO Max); My Mom Jayne (HBO); The Secrets We Bury (ID) |
| **Best Reality Series**: **Baylen Out Loud (TLC)**; 90 Day Fiancé: Before the 90 Days (TLC); Diners, Drive-Ins and Dives (Food Network); Love Is Blind (Netflix); Love on the Spectrum (Netflix); Naked and Afraid (Discovery); Queer Eye (Netflix); Ready to Love (OWN); The Secret Lives of Mormon Wives (Hulu); Shark Tank (ABC) | **Best Reality Competition Series**: **Dancing with the Stars (ABC)**; Beast Games: Strong vs. Smart (Prime Video); Love Island USA (Peacock); Naked and Afraid: Last One Standing (Discovery); RuPaul's Drag Race (MTV); Squid Game: The Challenge (Netflix); Survivor (CBS); Tournament of Champions (Food Network); The Traitors (Peacock); The Voice (NBC) |
| **Best Standup or Variety Special**: **The Muppet Show (ABC)**; Dave Chappelle: The Unstoppable (Netflix); Nikki Glaser: Good Girl (Hulu); The Oscars (ABC); Taylor Swift: The Eras Tour: The Final Show (Disney+); Wanda Sykes: Legacy (Netflix) | **Best Talk or Variety Series**: **The Late Show with Stephen Colbert (CBS)**; The Daily Show (Comedy Central); Hot Ones (YouTube); Jimmy Kimmel Live! (ABC); Last Week Tonight with John Oliver (HBO); Saturday Night Live (NBC) |

=== Performance ===
==== Lead ====
| **Best Actor in a Comedy Series**: **Jason Segel – Shrinking (Apple TV) as Jimmy Laird**; Yahya Abdul-Mateen II – Wonder Man (Disney+) as Simon Williams; Zach Braff – Scrubs (ABC) as Dr. John "J.D." Dorian; Adam Brody – Nobody Wants This (Netflix) as Noah Roklov; Steve Carell – Rooster (HBO) as Greg Russo; John Cena – Peacemaker (HBO Max) as Christopher Smith / Peacemaker; David Alan Grier – St. Denis Medical (NBC) as Ron; Ethan Hawke – The Lowdown (FX) as Lee Raybon; Steve Martin – Only Murders in the Building (Hulu) as Charles-Haden Savage; Martin Short – Only Murders in the Building (Hulu) as Oliver Putnam | **Best Actress in a Comedy Series**: **Jean Smart – Hacks (HBO Max) as Deborah Vance**; Malin Akerman – The Hunting Wives (Netflix) as Margo Banks; Quinta Brunson – Abbott Elementary (ABC) as Janine Teagues; Elle Fanning – Margo's Got Money Troubles (Apple TV) as Margo Millet; Selena Gomez – Only Murders in the Building (Hulu) as Mabel Mora; Lisa Kudrow – The Comeback (HBO) as Valerie Cherish; Jenna Ortega – Wednesday (Netflix) as Wednesday Addams; Keke Palmer – The 'Burbs (Peacock) as Samira Fisher; Carrie Preston – Elsbeth (CBS) as Elsbeth Tascioni; Rachel Sennott – I Love LA (HBO) as Maia Simsbury; Brittany Snow – The Hunting Wives (Netflix) Sophie O'Neil |
| **Best Actor in a Drama Series**: **Noah Wyle – The Pitt (HBO Max) as Dr. Michael "Robby" Robinavitch**; Sterling K. Brown – Paradise (Hulu) as Xavier Collins; Walton Goggins – Fallout (Prime Video) as Cooper Howard / The Ghoul; Sam Heughan – Outlander (Starz) as Jamie Fraser; Billy Magnussen – The Audacity (AMC) as Duncan Park; Gary Oldman – Slow Horses (Apple TV) as Jackson Lamb; Ramón Rodríguez – Will Trent (ABC) as Will Trent; Mark Ruffalo – Task (HBO) as Tom Brandis; Antony Starr – The Boys (Prime Video) as Homelander; Billy Bob Thornton – Landman (Paramount+) as Tommy Norris | **Best Actress in a Drama Series**: **Keri Russell – The Diplomat (Netflix) as Kate Wyler**; Angela Bassett – 9-1-1 (ABC) as Athena Grant; Kathy Bates – Matlock (CBS) as Madeline "Matty" Matlock / Madeline Kingston; Carrie Coon – The Gilded Age (HBO) as Bertha Russell; Chase Infiniti – The Testaments (Hulu) as Agnes MacKenzie; Kaitlin Olson – High Potential (ABC) as Morgan Gillory; Michelle Pfeiffer – The Madison (Paramount+) as Stacy Clyburn; Ella Purnell – Fallout (Prime Video) as Lucy MacLean; Rhea Seehorn – Pluribus (Apple TV) as Carol Sturka; Zendaya – Euphoria (HBO) as Rue Bennett |
| **Best Actor in a Limited Series or TV Movie**: **Oscar Isaac – Beef (Netflix) as Joshua Martín**; Riz Ahmed – Bait (Prime Video) as Shah Latif; Richard Gadd – Half Man (HBO) as Ruben Pallister; Paul Anthony Kelly – Love Story (FX) as John F. Kennedy Jr.; Lewis Pullman – Remarkably Bright Creatures (Netflix) as Cameron Cassmore; Matthew Rhys – The Beast in Me (Netflix) as Nile Jarvis | **Best Actress in a Limited Series or TV Movie**: **Sally Field – Remarkably Bright Creatures (Netflix) as Tova Sullivan**; Claire Danes – The Beast in Me (Netflix) as Aggie Wiggs; Camila Morrone – Something Very Bad Is Going to Happen (Netflix) as Rachel Alexandra Harkin; Carey Mulligan – Beef (Netflix) as Lindsay Crane-Martín; Sarah Pidgeon – Love Story (FX) as Carolyn Bessette; Sarah Snook – All Her Fault (Peacock) as Marissa Irvine |
**Best Lead Voice-Over Performance**: **Seth MacFarlane – Ted (Peacock) as Ted**; Abbi Jacobson – Long Story Short (Netflix) as Shira Schwooper; Anjali Kunapaneni – Witch Hat Atelier (Crunchyroll) as Coco; Patrick Seitz – Rooster Fighter (Adult Swim) as Keiji; Sam Witwer – Star Wars: Maul – Shadow Lord (Disney+) as Maul; Steven Yeun – Invincible (Prime Video) as Markus "Mark" Grayson / Invincible

==== Supporting ====
| **Best Supporting Actor in a Comedy Series**: **Harrison Ford – Shrinking (Apple TV) as Dr. Paul Rhoades**; Paul W. Downs – Hacks (HBO Max) as Jimmy LuSaque Jr.; Phil Dunster – Rooster (HBO) as Archie Bates; Donald Faison – Scrubs (ABC) as Dr. Christopher Turk; Josh Hutcherson – I Love LA (HBO) as Dylan; John C. McGinley – Rooster (HBO) as Walter Mann; Ted McGinley – Shrinking (Apple TV) as Derek Bishop; Nick Offerman – Margo's Got Money Troubles (Apple TV) as James "Jinx" Millet; Daniel Radcliffe – The Fall and Rise of Reggie Dinkins (NBC) as Arthur Tobin; Tyler James Williams – Abbott Elementary (ABC) as Gregory Eddie | **Best Supporting Actress in a Comedy Series**: **Hannah Einbinder – Hacks (HBO Max) as Ava Daniels**; Odessa A'zion – I Love LA (HBO) as Tallulah Stiel; Sarah Chalke – Scrubs (ABC) as Dr. Elliot Reid; Charly Clive – Rooster (HBO) as Katie Russo; Danielle Deadwyler – Rooster (HBO) as Dylan Shepard; Janelle James – Abbott Elementary (ABC) as Ava Coleman; Emma Myers – Wednesday (Netflix) as Enid Sinclair; Michelle Pfeiffer – Margo's Got Money Troubles (Apple TV) as Shyanne; Sheryl Lee Ralph – Abbott Elementary (ABC) as Barbara Howard; Jessica Williams – Shrinking (Apple TV) as Gaby Evans |
| **Best Supporting Actor in a Drama Series**: **Patrick Ball – The Pitt (HBO Max) as Dr. Frank Langdon**; Jensen Ackles – The Boys (Prime Video) as Soldier Boy; Jamie Campbell Bower – Stranger Things (Netflix) as Henry Creel / One / Vecna / Mr. Whatsit; Billy Crudup – The Morning Show (Apple TV) as Cory Ellison; Zach Galifianakis – The Audacity (AMC) as Carl Bardolph; Shawn Hatosy – The Pitt (HBO Max) as Dr. Jack Abbot; James Marsden – Paradise (Hulu) as President Cal Bradford; Tom Pelphrey – Task (HBO) as Robbie Prendergrast; Jason Ritter – Matlock (CBS) as Julian Markston; Bill Skarsgård – It: Welcome to Derry (HBO) as Pennywise | **Best Supporting Actress in a Drama Series**: **Sepideh Moafi – The Pitt (HBO Max) as Dr. Baran Al-Hashimi**; Christine Baranski – The Gilded Age (HBO) as Agnes van Rhijn; Isa Briones – The Pitt (HBO Max) as Dr. Trinity Santos; Taylor Dearden – The Pitt (HBO Max) as Dr. Melissa "Mel" King; Rebecca Hall – The Beauty (FX) as Jordan Bennett; Jennifer Love Hewitt – 9-1-1 (ABC) as Maddie Buckley; Allison Janney – The Diplomat (Netflix) as Grace Hagen Penn; Emilia Jones – Task (HBO) as Maeve Prendergrast; Katherine LaNasa – The Pitt (HBO Max) as Dana Evans; Alfre Woodard – The Boroughs (Netflix) as Judy Daniels |
| **Best Supporting Actor in a Limited Series or TV Movie**: **Charles Melton – Beef (Netflix) as Austin Davis**; Jason Bateman – DTF St. Louis (HBO) as Clark Forrest; Jamie Bell – Half Man (HBO) as Niall Kennedy; David Harbour – DTF St. Louis (HBO) as Floyd Smernitch; Troy Kotsur – Black Rabbit (Netflix) as Joe Mancuso; Jake Lacy – All Her Fault (Peacock) as Peter Irvine | **Best Supporting Actress in a Limited Series or TV Movie**: **Linda Cardellini – DTF St. Louis (HBO) as Carol Love-Smernitch**; Dakota Fanning – All Her Fault (Peacock) as Jenny Kaminski; Grace Gummer – Love Story (FX) as Caroline Kennedy; Brittany Snow – The Beast in Me (Netflix) as Nina Jarvis; Cailee Spaeny – Beef (Netflix) as Ashley Miller; Youn Yuh-jung – Beef (Netflix) as Chairwoman Park |
**Best Supporting Voice-Over Performance**: **Stephanie Beatriz – Hazbin Hotel (Prime Video) as Vaggie / Vaggi**; Alex Brightman – Hazbin Hotel (Prime Video) as Sir Pentious / Adam; Mark Hamill – Regular Show: The Lost Tapes (Cartoon Network) as Skips / Walks; Seth MacFarlane – Family Guy (Fox) as Various; J. K. Simmons – Invincible (Prime Video) as Nolan Grayson / Omni-Man; Joshua A. Waters – Witch Hat Atelier (Crunchyroll) as Qifrey

==== Guest ====
| **Best Guest Actor in a Comedy Series**: **Michael J. Fox – Shrinking (Apple TV) as Gerry**; Brett Goldstein – Shrinking (Apple TV) as Louis Winston; Ryan Gosling – Saturday Night Live (NBC) as Himself; Christopher McDonald – Hacks (HBO Max) as Marty Ghilain; John C. McGinley – Scrubs (ABC) as Dr. Perry Cox; Elijah Wood – I Love LA (HBO) as Himself | **Best Guest Actress in a Comedy Series**: **Christina Ricci – Wednesday (Netflix) as Marilyn Thornhill / Laurel Gates**; Jamie Lee Curtis – The Bear (FX) as Donna Berzatto; Taraji P. Henson – Abbott Elementary (ABC) as Vanetta Teagues; Cherry Jones – Hacks (HBO Max) as Kelly Kilpatrick; Kaitlin Olson – Hacks (HBO Max) as Deborah "DJ" Vance Jr.; Amy Sedaris – Elsbeth (CBS) as Laurel Hammond-Muntz |
| **Best Guest Actor in a Drama Series**: **Macaulay Culkin – Fallout (Prime Video) as Lacerta Legate**; Eric Dane – Euphoria (HBO) as Cal Jacobs; Giancarlo Esposito – The Boys (Prime Video) as Stan Edgar; Bill Pullman – The Boroughs (Netflix) as Jack Willard; Paul Reiser – The Boys (Prime Video) as The Legend; Bradley Whitford – The Diplomat (Netflix) as Todd Penn | **Best Guest Actress in a Drama Series**: **Tal Anderson – The Pitt (HBO Max) as Becca King**; Elisabeth Moss – The Testaments (Hulu) as June Osborne; Isabella Rossellini – The Beauty (FX) as Franny Forst; Kiernan Shipka – Industry (HBO) as Hayley Clay; Miriam Shor – Pluribus (Apple TV) as Helen L. Umstead; Shailene Woodley – Paradise (Hulu) as Annie Clay |

==== Cast Ensemble ====
| **Best Broadcast Network Comedy Ensemble**: **St. Denis Medical (NBC)**; Abbott Elementary (ABC); Best Medicine (Fox); Ghosts (CBS); Scrubs (ABC); Shifting Gears (ABC) | **Best Cable Comedy Ensemble**: **Rooster (HBO)**; American Classic (MGM+); The Chair Company (HBO); I Love LA (HBO); It's Always Sunny in Philadelphia (FX); The Lowdown (FX) |
| **Best Streaming Comedy Ensemble**: **Shrinking (Apple TV)**; Gen V (Prime Video); Hacks (HBO Max); Margo's Got Money Troubles (Apple TV); Nobody Wants This (Netflix); Only Murders in the Building (Hulu) | **Best Broadcast Network Drama Ensemble**: **9-1-1 (ABC)**; Grey's Anatomy (ABC); High Potential (ABC); Marshals (CBS); Matlock (CBS); Will Trent (ABC) |
| **Best Cable Drama Ensemble**: **It: Welcome to Derry (HBO)**; The Audacity (AMC); The Beauty (FX); Euphoria (HBO); From (MGM+); Outlander (Starz) | **Best Streaming Drama Ensemble**: **The Pitt (HBO Max)**; The Boys (Prime Video); Landman (Paramount+); Paradise (Hulu); Pluribus (Apple TV); Stranger Things (Netflix) |
**Best Limited Series or TV Movie Cast Ensemble**: **Beef (Netflix)**; All Her Fault (Peacock); The Girlfriend (Prime Video); Lord of the Flies (Netflix); Mike & Nick & Nick & Alice (Hulu); Something Very Bad Is Going to Happen (Netflix)

=== Directing ===
| **Best Directing in a Comedy Series**: **Hacks (HBO Max)**; Abbott Elementary (ABC); Gen V (Prime Video); Ghosts (CBS); The Lowdown (FX); Only Murders in the Building (Hulu); Rooster (HBO); Shrinking (Apple TV); Ted (Peacock); Wednesday (Netflix) | **Best Directing in a Drama Series**: **The Pitt (HBO Max)**; 9-1-1 (ABC); The Boys (Prime Video); The Diplomat (Netflix); Fallout (Prime Video); The Gilded Age (HBO); It: Welcome to Derry (HBO); Paradise (Hulu); Pluribus (Apple TV); Will Trent (ABC) |
**Best Directing in a Limited Series or TV Movie**: **Beef (Netflix)**; All Her Fault (Peacock); DTF St. Louis (HBO); The Girlfriend (Prime Video); Remarkably Bright Creatures (Netflix); Something Very Bad Is Going to Happen (Netflix)

=== Writing ===
| **Best Writing in a Comedy Series**: **The Comeback (HBO)**; Abbott Elementary (ABC); Elsbeth (CBS); Gen V (Prime Video); Hacks (HBO Max); Only Murders in the Building (Hulu); Rooster (HBO); Scrubs (ABC); Shrinking (Apple TV); Ted (Peacock) | **Best Writing in a Drama Series**: **Pluribus (Apple TV)**; The Audacity (AMC); The Diplomat (Netflix); From (MGM+); High Potential (ABC); Industry (HBO); Paradise (Hulu); The Pitt (HBO Max); Task (HBO); The Testaments (Hulu) |
**Best Writing in a Limited Series or TV Movie**: **Bait (Prime Video)**; All Her Fault (Peacock); Beef (Netflix); DTF St. Louis (HBO); Remarkably Bright Creatures (Netflix); Something Very Bad Is Going to Happen (Netflix)

== Honorary Awards ==
- Impact Award – Troy Kotsur
- Virtuoso Award – Shawn Hatosy
- Generations Award – Jason Ritter
- Timeless Award – William H. Macy
- TV Breakout Star Award – Natalie Alyn Lind
- Actor Spotlight Award – Cedric the Entertainer

== Most wins ==
Wins by series
| Wins | Series |
|---|---|
| 7 | The Pitt |
| 5 | Beef |
| 4 | Hacks |
| 4 | Shrinking |
| 2 | Hazbin Hotel |
| 2 | Remarkably Bright Creatures |

== Most nominations ==
Nominations by series
| Nominations | Series |
|---|---|
| 12 | The Pitt |
| 10 | Hacks |
| 10 | Shrinking |
| 9 | Abbott Elementary |
| 9 | Beef |
| 9 | Rooster |
| 7 | All Her Fault |
| 7 | The Boys |
| 7 | Paradise |
| 7 | Scrubs |
| 6 | The Diplomat |
| 6 | DTF St. Louis |
| 6 | I Love LA |
| 6 | Margo's Got Money Troubles |
| 6 | Only Murders in the Building |
| 6 | Pluribus |
| 5 | Remarkably Bright Creatures |
| 4 | 9-1-1 |
| 4 | The Audacity |
| 4 | The Beast in Me |
| 4 | Elsbeth |
| 4 | Fallout |
| 4 | High Potential |
| 4 | Something Very Bad Is Going to Happen |
| 4 | Task |
| 4 | Ted |
| 4 | The Testaments |
| 4 | Wednesday |
| 3 | The Beauty |
| 3 | Euphoria |
| 3 | From |
| 3 | Gen V |
| 3 | The Gilded Age |
| 3 | The Girlfriend |
| 3 | Half Man |
| 3 | Hazbin Hotel |
| 3 | The Hunting Wives |
| 3 | Invincible |
| 3 | It: Welcome to Derry |
| 3 | Landman |
| 3 | Love Story |
| 3 | The Lowdown |
| 3 | Matlock |
| 3 | Outlander |
| 3 | Will Trent |
| 3 | Witch Hat Atelier |
| 2 | Bait |
| 2 | The Boroughs |
| 2 | The Comeback |
| 2 | Family Guy |
| 2 | Ghosts |
| 2 | Heated Rivalry |
| 2 | Industry |
| 2 | Long Story Short |
| 2 | Mike & Nick & Nick & Alice |
| 2 | Nobody Wants This |
| 2 | Rooster Fighter |
| 2 | Saturday Night Live |
| 2 | St. Denis Medical |
| 2 | Stranger Things |
