= Rooster (TV series) =

2026 American television series

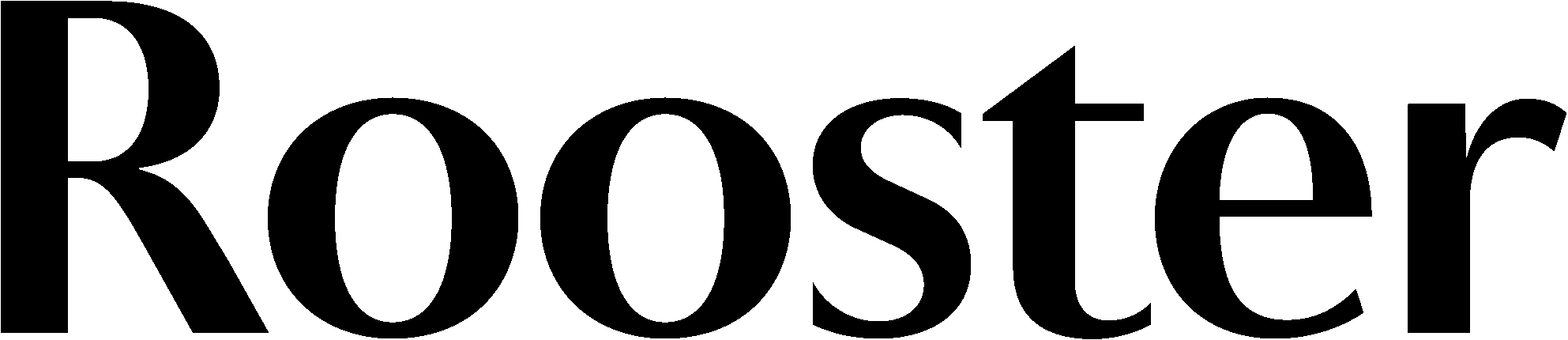
- Genre: Comedy-drama
- Created by: Bill Lawrence; Matt Tarses
- Starring: Steve Carell; Danielle Deadwyler; Phil Dunster; Charly Clive; Lauren Tsai; John C. McGinley
- Music by: Andrew Watt
- Opening theme: "I Played the Fool" by Michael Stipe and Andrew Watt
- Country of origin: United States
- Original language: English
- No. of seasons: 1
- No. of episodes: 10

Production
- Executive producers: Bill Lawrence; Matt Tarses; Jeff Ingold; Liza Katzer; Steve Carell; Jonathan Krisel; Barbie Adler; Annie Mebane; David Stassen; Anthony King; David Hyman
- Producer: Kindsey Young
- Cinematography: Blake McClure
- Editors: Ali Greer; Matthew Freund
- Running time: 30–34 minutes
- Production companies: Two Soups Productions; Doozer Productions; Warner Bros. Television

Original release
- Network: HBO
- Release: March 8, 2026 – present

Rooster is an American comedy-drama series created by Bill Lawrence and Matt Tarses and starring Steve Carell. It premiered on March 8, 2026 on HBO and received positive reviews. In April 2026, the series was renewed for a second season. At the 78th Primetime Emmy Awards, Carell received a nomination for the Primetime Emmy Award for Outstanding Lead Actor in a Comedy Series.

== Premise ==
The series is set on the New England campus of Ludlow College, centering on well-tred and semi-dysfunctional author Greg Russo's complicated relationship with his daughter Katie. Katie, an art history instructor, is shown navigating campus life during a separation from her husband, another professor at the fictional Ludlow. He has taken a graduate student as a lover. The show also investigates academic and administrative waters.

== Cast and characters ==
=== Main ===
- Steve Carell as Greg Russo
- Danielle Deadwyler as Dylan Shepard
- Phil Dunster as Archie Bates, Katie's estranged husband who left her for a graduate student
- Charly Clive as Katie Russo, Greg's daughter
- Lauren Tsai as Sunny, the graduate student for whom Archie left Katie
- John C. McGinley as Walter Mann, Ludlow College's president

=== Recurring ===
- Annie Mumolo as Crisle, Walter's executive assistant
- Connie Britton as Elizabeth "Beth" Stoddard, Greg's ex-wife and Katie's mother
- Rory Scovel as Officer Donnie Mullins, a campus police officer
- Alan Ruck as Dean Vincent Riggs
- Robby Hoffman as Mo, Sunny's friend and roommate
- Madison Hu as Eva
- Rick Glassman as Professor Donaldson
- Scott MacArthur as Coach Jake
- Maximo Salas as Tommy Newton, a student who befriends Greg.

=== Guest ===
- Nancy Carell as Susan Riggs, Dean Riggs' wife
- Brenda Strong as Joanie, President Mann's wife
- Jim O'Heir as Fred Sulewski, Sunny's father
- Timothy Stack as Graham, the accident-prone president of the Board of Trustees

== Episodes ==
No.	Title	Directed by	Written by	Original release date	Prod. code
1	"Release the Brown Fat"	Jonathan Krisel	Bill Lawrence & Matt Tarses	March 8, 2026	T12.20101
Greg Russo is a middle-aged author of a series of commercially popular beach read novels about a private investigator named Rooster. He arrives at Ludlow College, a liberal arts college in New England, to present a talk on his books, organized by English professor Dylan Shepard. His real reason for coming to Ludlow is to check on his daughter Katie, an art professor at the college, whose husband and fellow professor Archie has recently left her for a graduate student named Sunny. Katie assures her father that everything is fine, but he encourages her to talk to Archie. On his first night at Ludlow, Greg and Dylan share a drink at the local inn and reminisce about their lives. He offers to walk her home, but gently rebuffs her advances. The next day, Katie goes to Archie's home and learns that Sunny is pregnant; after forcing Archie out, Katie burns his most prized possession—a first-edition copy of Leo Tolstoy's War and Peace—in the fireplace, only for the fire to go out of control and burn Archie's house down. When Greg arrives at the scene, Katie refuses to deny her involvement in causing the fire.
2	"Trousers"	Jonathan Krisel	Annie Mebane	March 15, 2026	T12.20102
After Katie admits to having caused the fire and deliberately burning Archie's copy of War and Peace, her job gets placed in jeopardy. Katie decides to resign from her teaching position at Ludlow, but Greg tries to convince her otherwise. He is able to persuade Walter Mann, the college's eccentric president, to get Katie her job back on the condition that she writes a letter explaining her reasoning for the fire and that he accept a position as a writer-in-residence for the rest of the semester; Greg reluctantly agrees. Dylan attempts to get The Ludlow Review, the college's student writing publication, two issues a year but finds out that the Review is discontinuing its print edition due to budgetary cuts. She runs into Greg at a local diner, who apologizes for the previous night and buys her breakfast. Katie accidentally slips to Greg about Sunny's pregnancy; furious, Greg confronts Archie in his hotel room while he is conducting a televised interview for the BBC. The confrontation quickly turns physical, and a disgraced Archie moves into Sunny's apartment. Greg bids farewell to Katie and tells her that he will see her again that upcoming Monday.
3	"White Whale"	Zach Braff	David Stassen	March 22, 2026	T12.20103
Greg starts his first full day as a writer-in-residence at Ludlow. Since he never went to college and is nervous about teaching at a prestigious institution, he meticulously plans each class out in advance, which Katie tries to discourage. At his first class, Greg fails to endear himself to his students and lands in hot water with the school's disciplinary board when he calls a female student a "white whale". After complaining about the college's dean, Vincent Riggs, to Walt and learning that Riggs has retaliated against her, Dylan visits Riggs in his office only for him to suffer a near-fatal heart attack. Due to Riggs' injury, Dylan is named interim dean of faculty in his absence. Greg shows up to his second class late and decides to forgo the lesson plans, instead going for a spontaneous show of vulnerability that wins his students over. That night, he attends a hockey game he intended to go with Katie, but learns that she has decided to spend time with her TA and her friends instead. Dylan shows up at the game and tells Greg to go home if he hates being there so much; Greg is then shown at his new home, alone and tossing coins into a jar.
4	"Angry, Like An Angry Person"	Zach Braff	Barbie Adler	March 29, 2026	T12.20104
Greg assigns a paper for his class in which they write a short story in the style of their favorite author; Tommy, one of his students, chooses him as his basis for the assignment. Greg is secretly pleased, but learns that Tommy used artificial intelligence to write his paper. In the name of fairness, Dylan decides that Tommy can write a new paper in his own words due at midnight that night. Katie returns to teaching and is encouraged by some of her female students to stand up for herself as news about Sunny's pregnancy becomes public. Walt invites Ludlow's faculty to a get-together at his home. Greg reluctantly attends, but quickly bails in favor of playing beer pong and hanging out with Tommy and his friends, which then moves to a much more raucous college party. Greg drunkenly admits to Tommy that he never accomplished much in his life, to which Tommy encourages him to reinvent himself now that he is in college. As Tommy finishes his paper, Greg goes back to Walt's cocktail party with the intent of asking Dylan out on a date, but finds out that she is dating another man. He is instead propositioned by Walt's assistant Cristle and has sex with her in Walt's office. Katie goes out to a bar that night and unsuccessfully tries to flirt with the bartender; after drunkenly insulting Archie at the party, she has a one-night stand with him.
5	"Mr. Razzles"	Oz Rodriguez	Genevieve Aniello	April 5, 2026	T12.20105
6	"Cop Hawk"	Oz Rodriguez	Alain Bala & Tom McDonald	April 12, 2026	T12.20106
7	"All the Dogs' Names"	Anu Valia	Anthony King	April 19, 2026	T12.20107
8	"Nobody Spook It"	Anu Valia	Annie Mebane	April 26, 2026	T12.20108
9	"Ludlow's Fourth Hottest Professor"	Jonathan Krisel	Matthew Kerr	May 3, 2026	T12.20109
10	"Songs for Raisa"	Oz Rodriguez	Bill Lawrence & Matt Tarses	May 10, 2026	T12.20110

== Production ==
The ten-part series is written and created by Bill Lawrence and Matt Tarses and received a straight-to-series order from HBO in 2024. The cast is led by Steve Carell who is also an executive producer alongside Lawrence, Tarses, Jeff Ingold, Liza Katzer, Jonathan Krisel, Barbie Adler, Annie Mebane, David Stassen and Anthony King. It is produced by Warner Bros. Television and Doozer Productions.

Phil Dunster joined the cast in November 2024, with Charly Clive joining the cast as Carell's daughter the following month. In February 2025, Danielle Deadwyler, Lauren Tsai and John C. McGinley joined the cast. In June 2025, Annie Mumolo and Connie Britton joined the cast in recurring roles. In July 2025, Robby Hoffman and Scott MacArthur joined the cast in recurring roles.

On April 9, 2026, HBO renewed the series for a second season.

=== Filming ===
Principal photography for Rooster began in June 2025 at the University of the Pacific in Stockton, California which served as Ludlow College. Exteriors were filmed at the University of the Pacific over the course of four days. Looking to emulate an elite East Coast liberal arts school, co-creator Matt Tarses originally envisioned shooting Rooster at his alma mater Williams College in Massachusetts. However, the studio had approved shooting interiors in Los Angeles so they needed to find a college within driving distance of Los Angeles. Extras during the university shoot had to wear autumnal clothing in 100 °F / 37 °C heat. Additional footage for Ludlow College was shot at Occidental College and the University of Southern California. Studio filming for interiors took place at Warner Bros. Studios Burbank. Principal photography wrapped in August 2025.

== Release ==
The series premiered on HBO on March 8, 2026.

== Reception ==
=== Critical response ===
The first season holds an 88% approval rating on review aggregator website Rotten Tomatoes, based on 56 reviews, with an average rating of 7.4/10. The website's critics consensus reads: "Rooster nestles in with humor and heart thanks to Steve Carell's soothing performance and Danielle Deadwyler's exuberant support, leading Bill Lawrence's kind-spirited, good-time new series to lovely heights." Metacritic, which uses a weighted average, assigned a score of 68 out of 100, based on 28 critics, indicating "generally favorable" reviews. It has been compared to Lawrence's other TV series, namely Ted Lasso and Shrinking, and called by some critics as "hangout TV" and "found family TV".

=== Awards and nominations ===
Year	Award	Category	Recipient(s)	Result	Ref.
2026	Astra TV Awards	Best Comedy Series	Rooster	Nominated	
2026	Astra TV Awards	Best Actor in a Comedy Series	Steve Carell	Nominated	
2026	Astra TV Awards	Best Supporting Actor in a Comedy Series	Phil Dunster	Nominated	
2026	Astra TV Awards	Best Supporting Actor in a Comedy Series	John C. McGinley	Nominated	
2026	Astra TV Awards	Best Supporting Actress in a Comedy Series	Charly Clive	Nominated	
2026	Astra TV Awards	Best Supporting Actress in a Comedy Series	Danielle Deadwyler	Nominated	
2026	Astra TV Awards	Best Directing in a Comedy Series	Rooster	Nominated	
2026	Astra TV Awards	Best Writing in a Comedy Series	Rooster	Nominated	
2026	Astra TV Awards	Best Cable Comedy Ensemble	Rooster	Won	
2026	Black Reel TV Awards	Outstanding Supporting Performance in a Comedy Series	Danielle Deadwyler	Nominated	
2026	Primetime Emmy Awards	Outstanding Lead Actor in a Comedy Series	Steve Carell	Nominated	

=== Audience viewership ===
The series became the most-watched comedy premiere on HBO in the United States in over a decade, drawing 2.4 million viewers in the U.S. across platforms in its first three days of availability.
