= Surviving Christmas with the Relatives =

2018 British Christmas film directed by James Dearden

- Directed by: James Dearden
- Written by: James Dearden
- Produced by: Nick Hamson
- Cinematography: Matthias Pilz
- Edited by: Anuree De Silva
- Music by: Hugo de Chaire
- Production companies: Studio Soho Films; Gizmo Films
- Distributed by: Studio Soho Distribution
- Release date: 30 November 2018
- Running time: 101 minutes
- Country: United Kingdom
- Language: English

Surviving Christmas with the Relatives (also known as Christmas Survival in the United States) is a 2018 British Christmas film written and directed by James Dearden. It stars Julian Ovenden, Gemma Whelan, Joely Richardson and Michael Landes. It was released in the UK 30 November 2018 and was not well received.

== Cast ==
- Julian Ovenden as Dan
- Gemma Whelan as Miranda
- Joely Richardson as Lyla
- Michael Landes as Trent
- Sally Phillips as Miriam
- Ronni Ancona as Vicky
- Sophie Simnett as Bee
- Patricia Hodge as Aunt Peggy
- James Fox as Uncle John

== See also ==
- List of Christmas films
