= Twist (2021 film) =

2021 crime drama film

- Film poster
- Directed by: Martin Owen
- Screenplay by: Sally Collett; Martin Owen; John Wrathall
- Based on: Twist by Tom Grass Oliver Twist by Charles Dickens
- Produced by: Ben Grass; Noel Clarke; Jason Maza; Matt Williams
- Starring: Raff Law; Michael Caine; Lena Headey; Rita Ora; Sophie Simnett; Noel Clarke; David Walliams; Franz Drameh; Jason Maza
- Cinematography: Håvard Helle
- Music by: Neil Athale
- Production companies: Blue Rider; Lipsync Productions; MEP Capital; Particular Crowd; Pure Grass Films; Future Artists Entertainment; Red Bull Media House
- Distributed by: Sky Cinema
- Release date: 29 January 2021
- Running time: 88 minutes
- Country: United Kingdom
- Language: English
- Box office: $509,904

Twist is a 2021 British crime drama film directed by Martin Owen and co-produced by Noel Clarke and Jason Maza, who also star in the film. Based on the 2014 Tom Grass novel Twist, itself an adaptation of Charles Dickens' 1838 novel Oliver Twist, the film also stars Raff Law, Michael Caine, Lena Headey, Rita Ora and Sophie Simnett. Twist was released on Sky Cinema on 29 January 2021 and was met with negative reception from critics.

== Plot ==
Thief Tom Chitling steals an envelope from a safe and escapes guards, but is thrown off a building by an unseen assailant. The envelope is stolen while Tom is left to die.

Years before, Molly and her son Oliver live together with their hobby of painting. When Molly dies, Oliver knows nobody else and runs away. He teaches himself free running and gains the nickname "Twist". The police chase him for spraying graffiti on a traffic warden's van, and he meets Dodge and Batesey. They escape to their den near the Truman Brewery where Twist meets their carer Fagin. Twist paints a giant graffiti on a building. Fagin sends Red to invite Twist (who is smitten with her) to dinner. Fagin's friend Sikes reveals she pushed Chitling. Twist stays with the family, and Fagin plans to steal from art dealer Dr. Crispin Losberne who took everything from Fagin. Batesey steals Losberne's phone and makes a copy. Red distracts Losberne, allowing Fagin to get the blueprints to his gallery. Twist meets Sikes and her dog Bull's-Eye. Fagin explains that Losberne also betrayed Losberne's one-time partner Issac Solomon.

Red plants a small bomb in Losberne's bathroom to steal a William Hogarth painting. The bomb floods the basement, requiring the painting be moved. Twist is upset to find that Red and Sikes are a couple. At a pub, Red appears and Sikes’ goons attack the group while Dodge plays Ever Fallen in Love (With Someone You Shouldn't've) on the jukebox. Twist and Red escape to a pool where they kiss before running through the park. Twist is arrested for vandalising the traffic warden van and is interrogated by Detectives Brownlow and Bedwin who tell him about Chitling. Twist is released and returns to base. Batesey plans to hide in a box to steal the painting while it's on the move, but he is claustrophobic so Twist takes his place.

Losberne discovers the plot, causing Twist to fall out the van. Sikes picks up Batesey and apparently kills him. Back at base Twist asks what happened to Chitling and Sikes reveals she killed him. Disguised, the group sneaks into the auction house and Fagin triggers an evacuation by planting a gun on Losberne's chair. Twist takes the painting and escapes with Dodge. Batesey, still alive, meets them at base where Twist reveals he made a duplicate of the painting and hid the original. He and Red escape and Sikes shoots Fagin, then chases them to a rooftop where she is shot by Fagin and falls off the building.

A week later, Twist gives Bedwin and Brownlow the envelope and a key. He hints to Brownlow that the painting was right next to them the whole time. The envelope reveals the true owners of the painting and the key leads them to a locker owned by Losberne, which houses many stolen artworks. Losberne is arrested. Fagin is revealed to be Issac Solomon and leaves the gang. It is revealed that Twist snuck a painting by his mother into the van, and it goes on display at the National Gallery.

Twist tells the gang to stop stealing and start selling paintings, while he and Red start a relationship.

== Cast ==
- Raff Law as Oliver Twist
- Michael Caine as Isaac "Fagin" Solomon
- Lena Headey as Sikes
- Rita Ora as Dodge
- Noel Clarke as Brownlow
- Franz Drameh as Batesey
- Sophie Simnett as Nancy "Red" Lee
- David Walliams as Dr. Crispin Losberne
- Jason Maza as Bedwin
- Dominic Di Tommaso as Tom Chitling
- Leigh Francis as Warden Bumble
- Nick Nevern as Ron

== Production ==
It was announced in October 2019 that a new take on the Charles Dickens novel had begun filming, with Raff Law cast to play the titular Twist. Michael Caine was cast as Fagin, with Lena Headey and Rita Ora cast as female renditions of Bill Sikes and Artful Dodger, respectively. David Walliams, Franz Drameh and Sophie Simnett were also cast.

The film was produced by Pure Grass Films, along with Unstoppable Film and Television, and First Access Entertainment Film and Television. The UK-based company Koala FX was responsible for the digital make up and advance clean up.

== Music ==
Twist (Original Motion Picture Soundtrack)

Soundtrack album by Neil Athale
- Released: April 30, 2021
- Length: 41:28
- Labels: Twist Entertainment Ltd; MovieScore Media
- Producer: Tom Linden

Neil Athale chronology
Built To Be (2019)	Twist (Original Motion Picture Soundtrack) (2021)	N/A

Ora wrote a song for the film entitled “Flame”. The soundtrack was composed by Neil Athale and produced by Tom Linden who also wrote a song for the film (credited as TL) alongside Laura Greaves entitled “Get Back Up”.

No.	Title	Length
1.	"Let’s Twist"	2:05
2.	"What Does Oliver See?"	2:49
3.	"Fagin In Disguise"	1:21
4.	"Twist Meets The Gang"	1:46
5.	"I Can Go Anywhere"	1:38
6.	"Complications"	1:42
7.	"Fagin's Backstory"	2:11
8.	"Do You Want Some More?"	2:09
9.	"Twist and Red Have a Date"	2:25
10.	"Red and Losberne’s Date"	3:13
11.	"Heist at the Auction House"	3:23
12.	"Sikes Looses Control."	1:28
13.	"Nighttime Interrogations"	3:54
14.	"Bomb Confusion"	1:55
15.	"The Getaway"	2:25
16.	"Rooftops Showdown"	4:33
17.	"Get Back Up (performed by TL and featuring Laura Greaves)"	2:22
Total length:		41:28

== Release ==
Sky Cinema distributed the film within the United Kingdom, with Saban Films distributing within North America. Originally, the film was set for a 2020 release. However, the film was pushed to 2021. It was released on 29 January. The Vaccines’ unreleased song "Wanderlust" from their 5th LP, Back in Love City, was played during the trailer.

== Reception ==
On Rotten Tomatoes, it has a 9% score, based on 34 reviews, with an average rating of 3.40/10. Its critic consensus reads, "The real Twist in this lunkheaded Dickens update is the involvement of Michael Caine, who hopefully got another terrific house out of it." Peter Bradshaw of The Guardian gave it two stars out of five, saying that 'the action and comedy are under par'. Clarisse Loughrey of The Independent gave it one out of five stars, writing, 'With its hectic pace and textbook needle drops – The Fratellis' "Chelsea Dagger" makes an appearance – Twist never really functions as much more than another Guy Ritchie homage.'

== Accolades ==
Year	Award	Category	Recipient(s)	Result	Ref.
2022	Golden Raspberry Awards	Worst Prequel, Remake, Rip-off or Sequel	Twist (Rap remake of Oliver Twist)	Nominated	
2022	Golden Raspberry Awards	Worst Screenplay	Written by Sally Collett and John Wrathall; Additional Material by Tom Grass, Kevin Lehane, Michael Lindley and Matthew Parkhill; From an "Original Idea" by David T. Lynch, Keith Lynch and Simon Thomas	Nominated	
