= All My Friends Hate Me =

2021 film by Andrew Gaynord

- Film poster
- Directed by: Andrew Gaynord
- Written by: Tom Palmer; Tom Stourton
- Produced by: Tom Palmer; Esme Hicks
- Starring: Tom Stourton; Charly Clive; Georgina Campbell; Antonia Clarke
- Cinematography: Ben Moulden
- Edited by: Saam Hodivala
- Music by: Will Lowes; Joe Robbins
- Production companies: Totally Tom Films; Ravanburn Films; Endeavor Content; Fonic; Molten Keys; Ellipsis Pictures
- Distributed by: BFI Distribution
- Release date: June 2021 (Tribeca)
- Running time: 93 minutes
- Country: United Kingdom
- Language: English
- Box office: $80,405

All My Friends Hate Me is a 2021 British comedy horror film directed by Andrew Gaynord and written by Tom Palmer and Tom Stourton, who also stars in the film. It was released on 11 March 2022 in theatres with a digital release on March 25. It premiered at the 2021 Tribeca Film Festival.

== Plot ==
The socially anxious Pete has returned from volunteering in a refugee camp and is celebrating his 31st birthday at a country estate owned by his friend George. His friends, who include George, George's wife Fig, cocaine-loving Archie, and Pete's ex-girlfriend Claire, bring along Harry, a middle-aged man they met in the pub who has brought a wild goose with him. Harry's bizarre behavior disconcerts Pete. The friends reminisce, though Archie grows upset as Pete feigns ignorance about unflattering behaviors he'd shown in the past. Pete notices that his medication appears to have been tampered with, and spots a young girl as the background photo for Harry's phone.

The next morning, Pete finds Harry speaking with a different accent and wearing what appears to be Pete's clothes, but which are actually Harry's. While preparing to drive to the pub, the friends leave Pete with Harry. After becoming annoyed, Pete leaves Harry behind and comes across a wild goose, which has been decapitated. He then sees Harry charge at him with an axe. Harry chases him into the pub, where the act is revealed to be part of the friends' plans for a surprise party. Pete begins to lose his temper about his perception that they all find him a bad friend.

When they return to the house, Claire and Pete discuss their sexual history, and Pete's fiancée Sonia arrives to join the party. Pete goes through Harry's belongings, where he discovers Harry's observational notes on him, and he later confirms that his medication has indeed been replaced. Worrying that Harry has disclosed his history with Claire to Sonia, Pete anxiously tells her, but a confused Sonia insists that Pete had already informed her of the connection a long time ago.

The friends reveal a surprise from Harry: one of the local men appears, dressed as Pete and satirizing him, which explains the notes Harry had been taking. The parody gets more mean-spirited until both the actor and Harry begin barking at Pete. Pete breaks down and admits that when he was young, he and a friend had harassed a local girl who was afraid of dogs by calling her and barking into the phone. She committed suicide, and Pete believes Harry is the brother who had blamed him for the death, and she is the girl whose photo is on his phone. Confused, Harry reveals the girl is his daughter, and that he is actually an eccentric student the group had discussed on the first night; they found him on social media and invited him, and the barking had been a reference to Pete's past dare to his friends to kiss a dog.

Pete has a meltdown and accuses Harry of tampering with his medication, but Archie admits that he had been the one to do so, hoping to get Pete high so he could enjoy the party. Pete accuses everyone of being mean to him, but they point out that he has become self-centered and failed to ask a single question about them, instead incessantly talking about his charity work and acting rude. Pete angrily throws a vase at Harry and knocks him unconscious, which disturbs the other guests. The film ends as Pete and Sonia drive home. Pete tells Sonia that he would understand if she no longer wants to marry him. At first she suggests she does not, which upsets Pete, then reveals that she is joking and admonishes him for being unable to take a joke.

== Cast ==
- Tom Stourton as Pete
- Georgina Campbell as Fig
- Joshua McGuire as George
- Antonia Clarke as Claire
- Kieran Hodgson as Graham
- Charly Clive as Sonia
- Dustin Demri-Burns as Harry
- Christopher Fairbank as Norman
- Graham Dickson as Archie

== Reception ==
On the review aggregator website Rotten Tomatoes, 89% of 64 critics' reviews are positive, with an average rating of 6.8/10. The website's consensus reads: "As discomfiting as it is hard to turn away from, All My Friends Hate Me taps into the humor -- and horror -- of awkward social situations." Metacritic, which uses a weighted average, assigned the film a score of 71 out of 100, based on 19 critics, indicating "generally favorable" reviews.
