= Brackenbury Village =

District of Hammersmith, London, England

Coordinates: 51.499°N 0.232°W

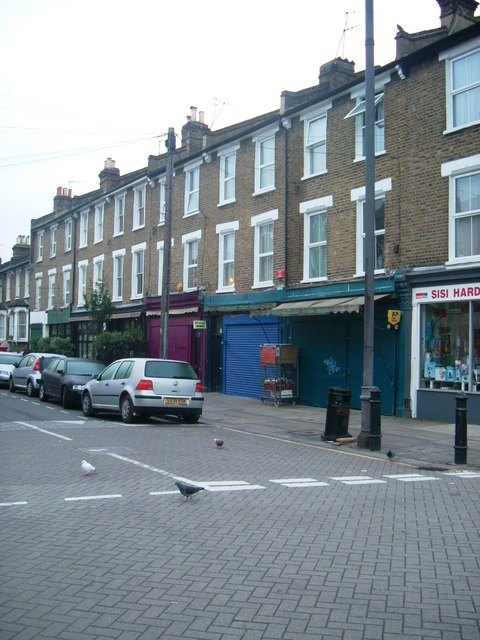

- Location within Greater London
- OS grid reference: TQ228791
- London borough: Hammersmith & Fulham
- Ceremonial county: Greater London
- Region: London
- Country: England
- Sovereign state: United Kingdom
- Post town: London
- Postcode district: W6
- Dialling code: 020
- Police: Metropolitan
- Fire: London
- Ambulance: London
- UK Parliament: Hammersmith and Chiswick
- London Assembly: West Central

Brackenbury Village is a residential district of Hammersmith in the London Borough of Hammersmith and Fulham, encompassing the streets between Glenthorne Road, Paddenswick/Dalling Roads, Goldhawk Road and west of the Hammersmith and City Line. The area was given its name by estate agents and named after Brackenbury Road, in which there is a small parade of shops that form the core of the self-styled village. Victorian terraced homes characterise the housing stock.

== History ==
In the 18th century, the land known then as Bradford Fords consisted primarily of orchards, vegetable beds, and landscaping plants irrigated by Stamford Brook. People began moving into the area and pubs opened on King Street in the early 19th century, and development rapidly accelerated with the arrival of the Hammersmith & City Railway in 1864. Bricks from Cambridge Grove were used to build rows of housing, churches, businesses, and schools. The present streetscape was near complete by 1890.

After Hammersmith experienced a decline in the 1930s and 40s, which threatened many buildings with demolition, the area saw a comeback in the late 20th century and became protected by conservation rules, with such buildings being restored and converted. Brackenbury Residents Association was founded in 1999. The name of the area came from estate agent descriptions, with houses in the area selling for upwards of a million pounds by the late 2000s and hitting a peak in 2016.

Brackenbury Village primarily attracts domestic buyers, especially those with families. Brackenbury Village has a high proportion of residents burning wood.

== Schools ==
The area has a private all-girl school, Godolphin and Latymer School, and two primary schools: Brackenbury Primary School and West London Free School Primary.

== Notable people ==
- Antonia Clarke, actress
- Jayne Hepsibah, milliner
- Mary Nightingale, journalist
- Jonathan Powell, political adviser
