= Staged =

UK television comedy series

- Genre: Sitcom
- Created by: Simon Evans; Phin Glynn
- Written by: Simon Evans
- Directed by: Simon Evans
- Starring: David Tennant; Michael Sheen; Simon Evans; Georgia Tennant; Anna Lundberg; Lucy Eaton
- Composer: Alex Baranowski
- Country of origin: United Kingdom
- Original language: English
- No. of series: 3
- No. of episodes: 21

Production
- Executive producers: Michael Sheen; David Tennant; Axel Kuschevatzky; Cindy Teperman; Geoff Iles
- Producers: Phin Glynn; Victor Glynn; Georgia Tennant
- Editor: Dan Gage
- Running time: 15–20 minutes
- Production company: Infinity Hill – GCB Films

Original release
- Network: BBC One
- Release: 10 June 2020 – 26 January 2021
- Network: Britbox
- Release: 31 December 2021 – 24 November 2022

Staged is a British television comedy series. Set and filmed during the COVID-19 pandemic in the United Kingdom, primarily using video-conferencing technology, the series stars actors Michael Sheen and David Tennant as fictionalised versions of themselves. Simon Evans, Georgia Tennant, Anna Lundberg, and Lucy Eaton also star. The first series premiered 10 June 2020 on BBC One, and the second series premiered 4 January 2021 on BBC One. A Comic Relief New Year Special was uploaded to the BritBox YouTube page on 31 December 2021. A third series, BackStaged, premiered on 24 November 2022 on BritBox.

== Premise ==
In the first series, Michael Sheen and David Tennant play fictionalised versions of themselves, trying to rehearse a performance of Luigi Pirandello's Six Characters in Search of an Author during lockdown via videoconference, while the underconfident director, Simon, struggles to keep control of the production.

The second series follows the "real" Michael and David following the success of the first series of Staged. Simon begins work on an American remake of the first series but Michael and David are not asked to reprise their roles.

The third series starts with Simon trying to get Michael and David to agree to a Christmas staged version of Six Characters in Search of an Author, and later A Christmas Carol, before becoming a metafictional behind the scenes documentary of the show entitled Backstaged.

== Cast and characters ==
=== Main ===
- David Tennant
- Michael Sheen

=== Co-starring ===
- Georgia Tennant, David's wife
- Anna Lundberg, Michael's girlfriend
- Lucy Eaton, Simon's sister
- Simon Evans, the director of the play and of Staged. Evans' acting role in the series is uncredited.

=== Guest ===
Guest stars play themselves unless otherwise noted.

==== Series 1 ====
- Nina Sosanya as Jo, financier of the play
- Rebecca Gage as Janine, assistant to Jo (voice only)
- Samuel L. Jackson
- Adrian Lester
- Judi Dench

==== Series 2 ====
- Nina Sosanya
- Whoopi Goldberg as Mary, agent to Michael and David
- Ben Schwartz as Tom, assistant to Mary
- Romesh Ranganathan
- Michael Palin
- Nick Frost
- Simon Pegg
- Christoph Waltz
- Ewan McGregor
- Hugh Bonneville
- Ken Jeong
- Jim Parsons
- Josh Gad
- Phoebe Waller-Bridge
- Cate Blanchett

==== Series 3: BackStaged ====
- Neil Gaiman
- Peter De Jersey as Dominic/himself
- Jim Broadbent
- Ebony Aboagye as Charlie, documentarian
- Ty Tennant
- Ben Schwartz
- Adrian Lester
- Nina Sosanya
- Lily Mo Sheen
- Olivia Colman
- Hari Mackinnon

== Episodes ==
Series	Episodes	Originally released		
Series	Episodes	First released	Last released	Network
1	6	10 June 2020	24 June 2020	BBC One
2	8	4 January 2021	26 January 2021	BBC One
Special		31 December 2021		Britbox
3	6	24 November 2022		Britbox

=== Series 1 (2020) ===
No. overall	No. in series	Title	Directed by	Written by	Original release date
1	1	"Cachu Hwch"	Simon Evans	Simon Evans	10 June 2020
2	2	"Up to No Good"	Simon Evans	Simon Evans	10 June 2020
3	3	"Who the F#!k Is Michael Sheen?"	Simon Evans	Simon Evans	17 June 2020
4	4	"Bara Brith"	Simon Evans	Simon Evans	17 June 2020
5	5	"Ulysses"	Simon Evans	Simon Evans	24 June 2020
6	6	"The Cookie Jar"	Simon Evans	Simon Evans	24 June 2020

=== Series 2 (2021) ===
No. overall	No. in series	Title	Directed by	Written by	Original release date
7	1	"Saddle Up Sheen"	Simon Evans	Simon Evans	4 January 2021
8	2	"Long Time, No See"	Simon Evans	Simon Evans	5 January 2021
9	3	"The Dirty Mochyns"	Simon Evans	Simon Evans	11 January 2021
10	4	"Woofty Doofty, David"	Simon Evans	Simon Evans	12 January 2021
11	5	"The Warthog and the Mongoose, Part 1"	Simon Evans	Simon Evans	18 January 2021
12	6	"The Warthog and the Mongoose, Part 2"	Simon Evans	Simon Evans	19 January 2021
13	7	"The Loo Recluse"	Simon Evans	Simon Evans	25 January 2021
14	8	"Until They Get Home"	Simon Evans	Simon Evans	26 January 2021

=== Specials (2021) ===
No. overall	Title	Directed by	Written by	Original release date
15	"Staged 1592"	Simon Evans	Simon Evans	19 March 2021
16	"Happy New Year from David Tennant & Michael Sheen"	Simon Evans	Simon Evans	31 December 2021

=== Series 3: BackStaged (2022) ===
No. overall	No. in series	Title	Directed by	Written by	Original release date
17	1	"Is There a Version?"	Simon Evans	Simon Evans	24 November 2022
18	2	"Who's Playing Who?"	Simon Evans	Simon Evans	24 November 2022
19	3	"Past"	Simon Evans	Simon Evans	24 November 2022
20	4	"Present"	Simon Evans	Simon Evans	24 November 2022
21	5	"Future"	Simon Evans	Simon Evans	24 November 2022
22	6	"Knock, Knock"	Simon Evans	Simon Evans	24 November 2022

== Release and reception ==
The series premiered on 10 June 2020 on BBC One. On 22 October 2020, it was announced that a second series had been commissioned. The second series premiered on 4 January 2021 on BBC One, and all eight episodes were added to BBC iPlayer on the same day. A New Year Special was uploaded to BritBox YouTube page on 31 December 2021, with Michael, David, Simon, Georgia, Anna & Lucy all reprising their roles.

The first series was released in the U.S. via streaming service Hulu on 16 September 2020.

A third series of six episodes premiered on 24 November 2022 on BritBox UK.

=== Critical response ===
The first series was well received by critics. Louis Chilton, in a four-starred review for The Independent, described Staged as "a welcome distraction, an eminently watchable portrait of two artists as petulant, egotistical children". Anna Leszkiewicz, for the New Statesman, said it was "charming: absurdly silly in a quiet, understated way". Rupert Hawksley, in the i, described it as "compelling 'lockdown' television". Gabriel Tate, reviewing Staged for Metro, said "Sheen and Tennant shared a warmth and willingness to take the mickey out of each other that felt entirely unforced." Fergus Morgan, writing in The Stage, gave the production five stars and said: "Tennant and Sheen are excellent, perennially, even when performing as themselves to their own laptops. Here, joined by Evans and by their real-life spouses – the actors Georgia Tennant and Anna Lundberg – they are on top form, crackling with snide chemistry. The whole thing is a treat."

The second series received more mixed reviews. Rupert Hawksley of The Independent called the first episode "stale and indulgent [...] Perhaps Staged was always this smug and we just didn’t notice, so grateful were we to have something new to watch, but the tone is now horribly out of step with the national mood." Writing for The Telegraph, Anita Singh criticised the meta aspects of the second series, saying "Staged is at its best when the duo are being funny, rather than debating whether or not they’re funny."
