= Scorn (upcoming film) =

- Directed by: Sarah-Violet Bliss
- Written by: Sarah-Violet Bliss
- Produced by: Dylan Clark; Brian Williams; Amy Jackson
- Starring: Adria Arjona; Kingsley Ben-Adir; Meredith Hagner; Guy Burnet; Freya Mavor; Sophie Simnett
- Production companies: Topic Studios; Dylan Clark Productions; Unified
- Countries: United States; United Kingdom
- Language: English

Scorn is an upcoming erotic thriller film written and directed by Sarah-Violet Bliss. It stars Adria Arjona, Kingsley Ben-Adir, Meredith Hagner, Guy Burnet, Freya Mavor, and Sophie Simnett.

== Cast ==
- Adria Arjona
- Kingsley Ben-Adir
- Meredith Hagner
- Guy Burnet
- Freya Mavor
- Sophie Simnett

== Production ==
In January 2026, it was reported that Sarah-Violet Bliss would be writing and directing an erotic thriller film, with Adria Arjona and Kingsley Ben-Adir cast in the lead roles. In February, Meredith Hagner, Guy Burnet, Freya Mavor, and Sophie Simnett joined the cast.

Principal photography began on January 28, 2026, in Horsforth.
