= Noke, Oxfordshire =

Village in Oxfordshire, England

Coordinates: 51.814°N 01.213°W

Noke
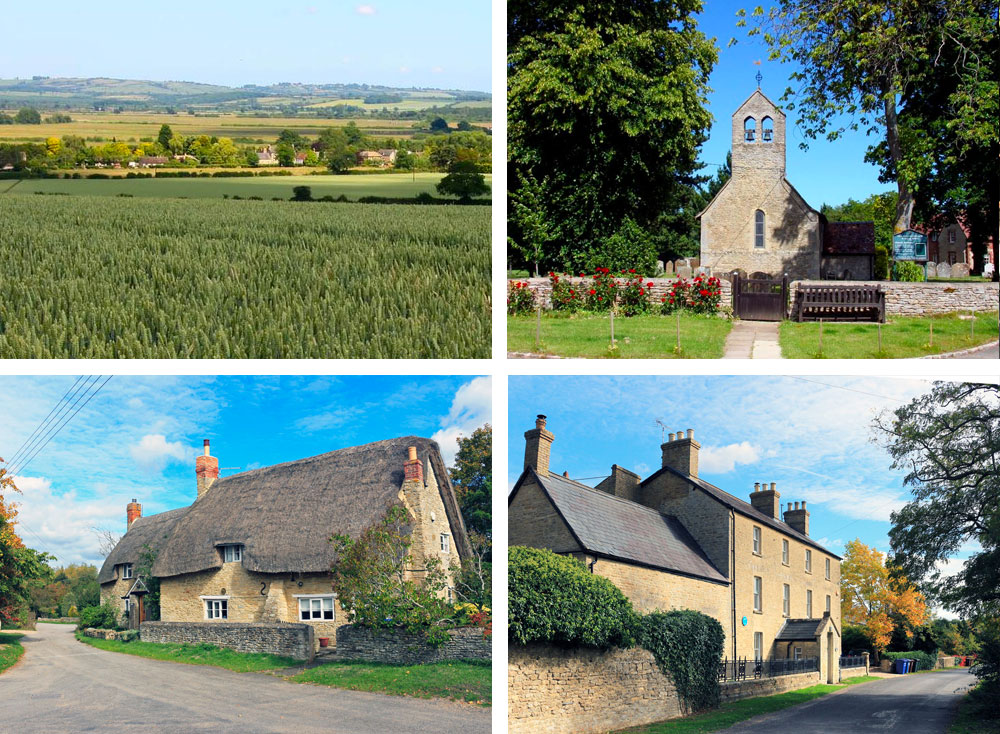
- Montage of Noke, Oxfordshire

- Location within Oxfordshire
- Area: 4.91 km^{2} (1.90 sq mi)
- Population: 136 (2021 census)
  - Density: 28/km^{2} (73/sq mi)
- OS grid reference: SP5514
- Civil parish: Noke
- District: Cherwell
- Shire county: Oxfordshire
- Region: South East
- Country: England
- Sovereign state: United Kingdom
- Post town: OXFORD
- Postcode district: OX3
- Dialling code: 01865
- Police: Thames Valley
- Fire: Oxfordshire
- Ambulance: South Central
- UK Parliament: Bicester and Woodstock

Noke is a small village and civil parish in Oxfordshire about 5 miles (8 km) northeast of Oxford. It is on the southeast edge of Otmoor and is one of the "Seven Towns of Otmoor". The toponym is derived from Old English and means "at the oak trees". The parish still has two woodlands: Prattle Wood about 500 yards (460 m) southwest of the village, and Noke Wood about 1 mile (1.6 km) to the southeast.

== History ==
=== Church ===
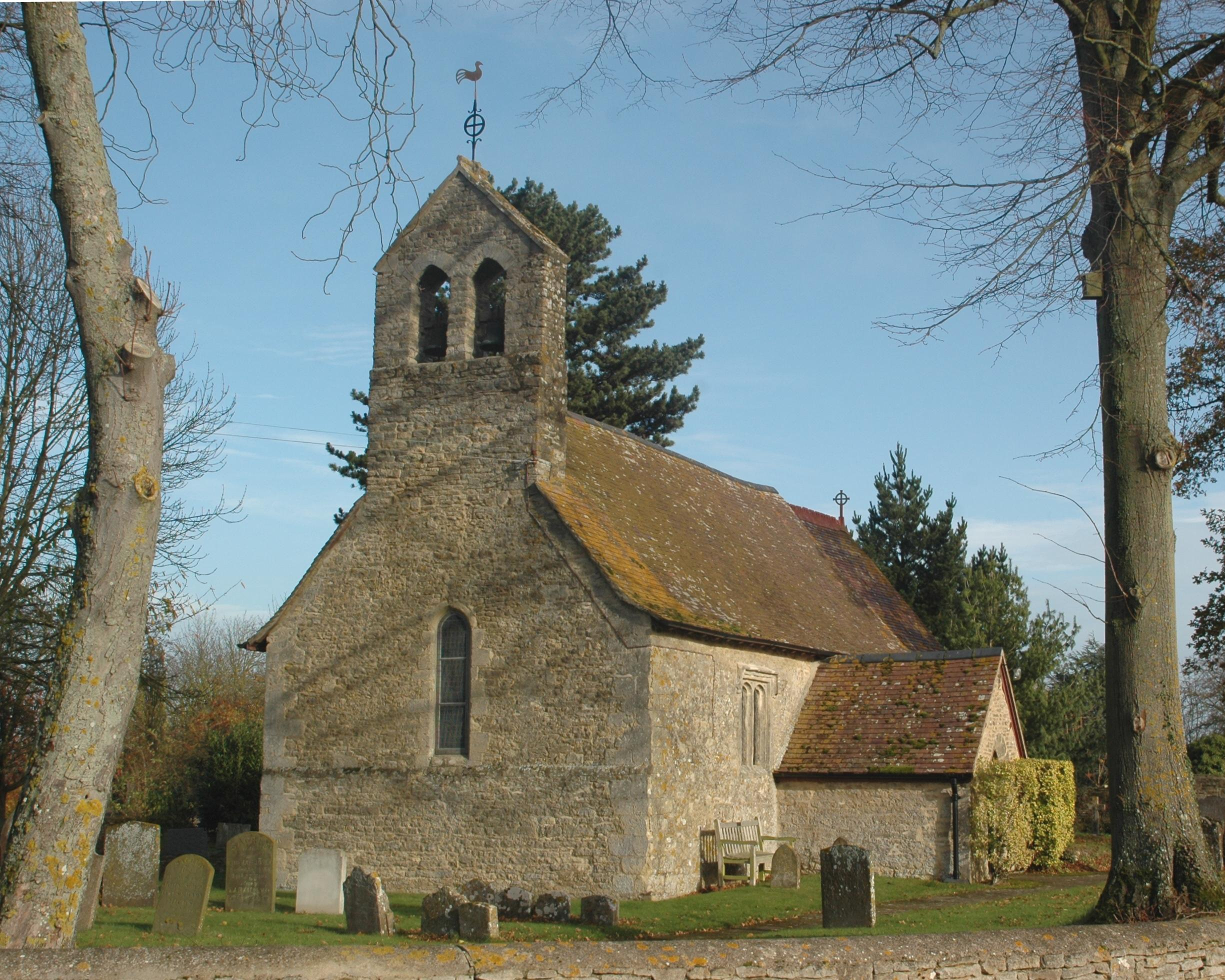
Church of England parish church of St Giles, Noke, seen from the west.

There was a church at Noke at least by 1191, when a priest was first recorded. The present Church of England parish church of Saint Giles dates from approximately 1270 and the list of rectors starts in 1272.

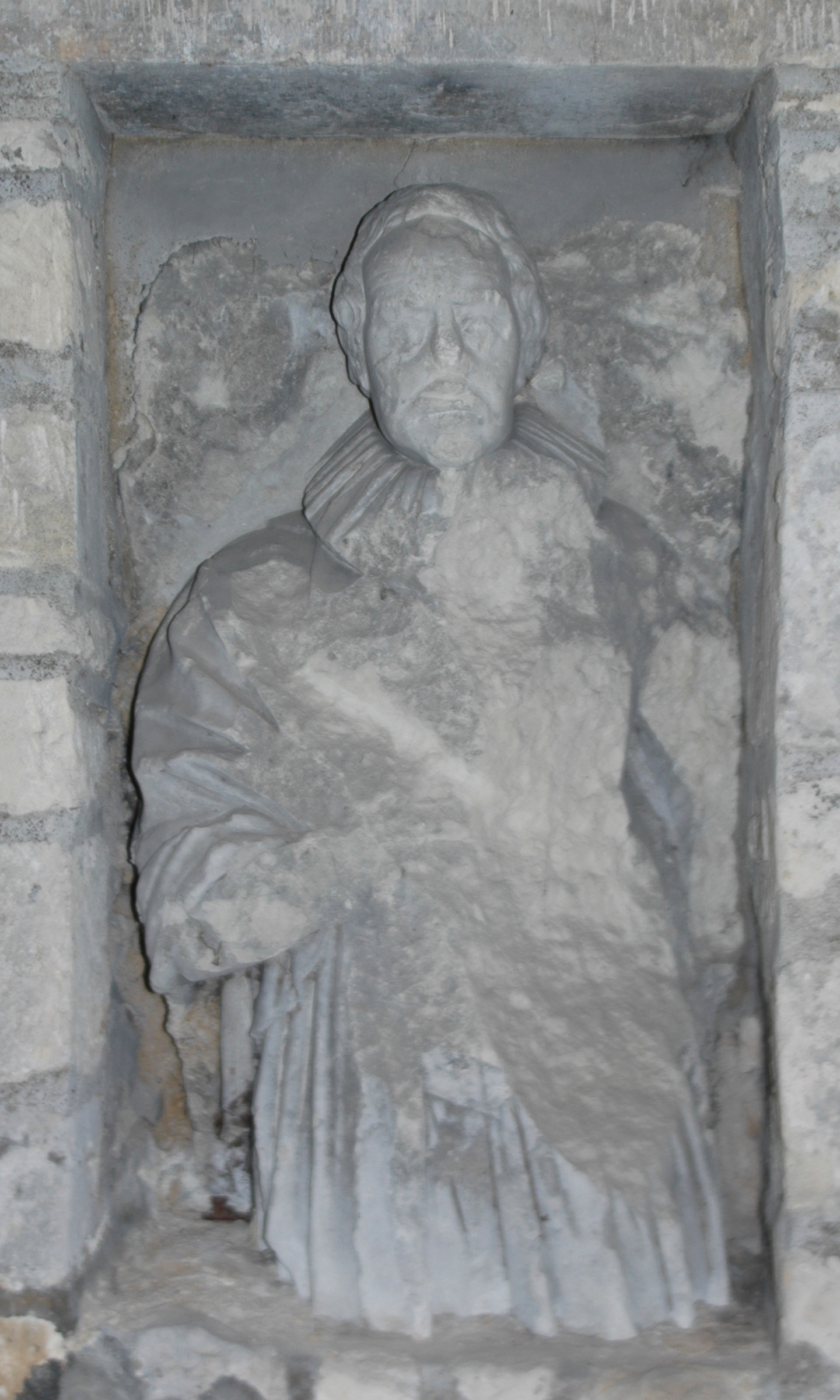
Damaged early 17th-century effigy in chancel of St. Giles' parish church

The building comprises a small nave and chancel, with a small bell-cote above the western gable and a south porch, and is primarily in the Early English Gothic style with many repairs and alterations through the years. Both the chancel with its double lancet window in the south wall and the chancel arch are probably 13th-century. On either side of the arch are two 14th- or 15th-century niches. At the end of the 16th century a mortuary chapel was added by Joan Bradshaw for the Winchcombe family on the north side of the church, but in 1745 the chapel was in a ruinous condition and was demolished. Further repairs took place in the 18th and 19th century; the last restoration was undertaken by the Oxford architect William Wilkinson (1819–1901).

=== 19th-century enclosure ===
From the 1820s local landowners attempted to enclose and drain Otmoor. The agricultural workers of the area resisted this, tearing down fences and destroying drainage works. The dispute was recorded in the poem 'I went to Noke but nobody spoke' , which relates how agents were paid to visit the villages and find out the names of the persons involved in the night raids:

I went to Noke
But nobody spoke;
I went to Thame,
It was just the same;
Burford and Brill
Were silent and still,
But I went to Beckley
And they spoke directly.

=== School ===
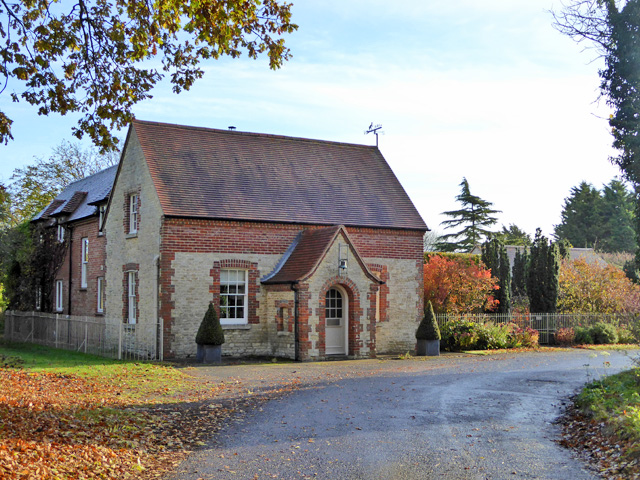
School House, Noke

During the 18th century there was no school in Noke, although by 1833 there was a Sunday school with 18 pupils.

In 1863 Noke Parochial School was built on land belonging to the Duke of Marlborough, by the Revd. John Carlyle who endowed it in the same year with £200. In 1871 the average attendance was 18.

From 1904, when the County Council assumed responsibility for the school. The school was reorganized for junior pupils only in 1931, when the seniors were transferred to Gosford Hill and Marston. In 1946 the school was closed. It is now a private house.

=== Public houses ===
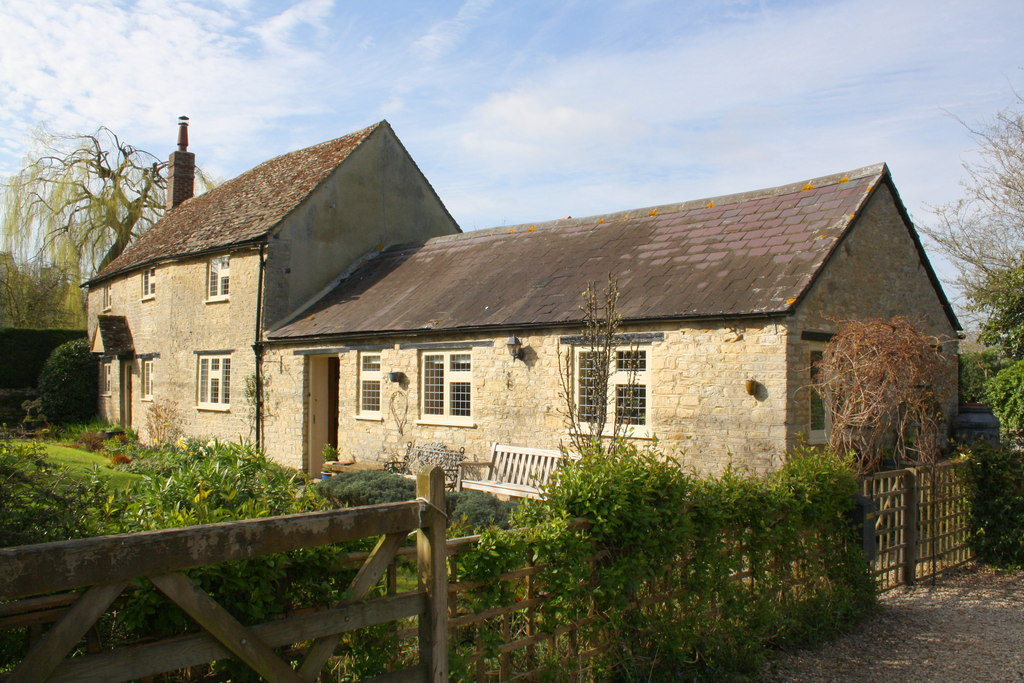
The former Plough Inn

There are no written records of public houses in Noke before 1800. In the 1840s there was a public house called the Marlborough Arms, but by 1955 there was one inn called The Plough. There are currently no public houses in the village.

== Notable people ==
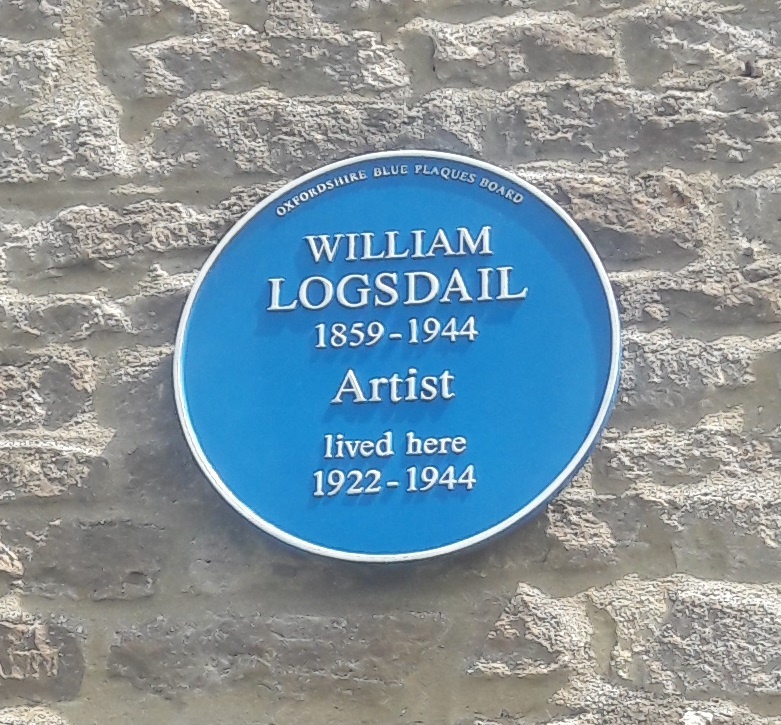
Blue Plaque for William Logsdail's house

Victorian painter William Logsdail lived in Noke from 1922 to 1944, and is commemorated by a blue plaque on his former home.

As of 2020, the writer, actor and director Simon Evans lives in Noke.

== Sources ==
- Lobel, Mary D, ed. (1959). A History of the County of Oxford: Volume 6. Victoria County History. pp. 268–272.
- Sherwood, Jennifer; Pevsner, Nikolaus (1974). Oxfordshire. The Buildings of England. Harmondsworth: Penguin Books. pp. 717–718. ISBN 0-14-071045-0.
