= Last Train to Christmas =

2021 film directed by Julian Kemp

- Directed by: Julian Kemp
- Written by: Julian Kemp
- Produced by: Matt Williams; Matthew James Wilkinson
- Starring: Michael Sheen
- Music by: Anne Nikitin
- Production companies: Sky Studios; Future Artists Entertainment; Stigma Films
- Distributed by: Sky Cinema
- Release date: 18 December 2021 (United Kingdom)
- Country: United Kingdom
- Language: English

Last Train to Christmas is a 2021 Christmas fantasy comedy-drama film written and directed by Julian Kemp. The film was released on 18 December 2021 in the United Kingdom via Sky Cinema and Now.

== Plot ==
On Christmas Eve 1985, Anthony "Tony" Towers, a successful nightclub manager, is engaged to his girlfriend Sue Taylor while travelling from London to Nottingham for a family reunion with his younger brother Roger. He is estranged from his wife Linda and his son, and has a strained relationship with Roger. But when Tony walks into the next carriage forwards, he is transported to 1995 and discovers that he lost everything. He soon realizes that he's in a time warp and can travel through time via the number of carriages: whenever he enters the next carriage in the direction the train is heading, he leaps 10 years forward. Whenever he enters the previous carriage, it's 10 years back.

Not only can he travel through the decades: He discovers that he also is able to change the history of the people travelling with him in the train, by changing former decisions in his life, including having a daughter instead of a son. But no matter when or how he changes his decisions, they always seem to come to desperate endings.

During one of these instances, Tony finds out from his depressed Auntie Vi that his marriage to Sue became strained due to his celebrity life. Eventually Tony travels back to 1955, accidentally forcing his parents to tell Roger that he is actually their nephew, and Auntie Vi is Roger's mother. In this alternate timeline Roger is bitter over being abandoned as a child, and has succumbed to the temptations Tony has endured: getting arrested in 1975, being an alcoholic in 1995, and dying in 2005.

Upon entering an alternate 1985, Tony reunites with Sue. He encourages her to live out the life she deserves before bidding farewell. By travelling back to 1945 during his childhood, Tony is able to stop Auntie Vi from abandoning baby Roger.

Train attendants then walk Tony further down the train than he ever has before, to the front carriage of the train and the year 2015. He gets off the train at Nottingham, and a relieved Tony sees an unseen person, implied to be Roger, playing on a piano an original song they had written in their youth.

== Cast ==
- Michael Sheen as Anthony "Tony" Towers (35, 45, 55, 65 and 75)
  - Thomas Law as Tony (25)
  - Harry Giubileo as Tony (15)
  - George Cobell as Tony (5)
- Cary Elwes as Roger Towers (30, 40, 50 and 70)
  - Jack Christou as Roger (20)
  - Vaughn Challoner as Roger (10)
  - Alexander Spence-Warren as Roger (new-born)
- Nathalie Emmanuel as Sue Taylor
- Katherine Kelly as Paula
- Phyllis Logan as Auntie Vi (65 and 75)
  - Holly Earl as Auntie Vi (15)
- John Thomson as Vic
- Danny Ashok as Morris
- Anna Lundberg as Astrid
- Mia McKenna-Bruce as Linda
- Sophie Simnett as Jenny (23 and 43)
  - Isla Whitcombe as Jenny (3)
- Robin Askwith as Tristan
- Hayley Mills as Celia Towers (85)
  - Sianad Gregory as Celia (25 and 35)
- George Hannigan as Nick
- Natalie Mitson as Valerie
- Laura Evelyn as Pam
- David Shaw-Parker as Arthur Towers (87)
  - Edward Harrison as Arthur (27 and 37)
- Bob Golding as Webster
- Dave Chapman as Wetherby

== Production ==
The film, written and directed by Julian Kemp, was announced on 20 October 2021 ahead of its December release. It was produced by Sky Studios, Matt Williams of Future Artists Entertainment, and Matthew James Wilkinson of Stigma Films.

Michael Sheen and Nathalie Emmanuel were announced as the film's stars, followed by an announcement that Cary Elwes had also boarded the project.

== Release ==
=== Marketing ===
A trailer was revealed on 24 November 2021. The film was included in Sky's festive slate.

== See also ==
- List of Christmas films
- List of films featuring time loops
