= Antonia Clarke =

English actress

- Clarke in 2026
- Born: 24 May 1995 (age 31); Hammersmith, London, United Kingdom
- Education: Goldsmiths, University of London; University of Oxford
- Occupations: Actress; singer
- Years active: 2011–present

Antonia Sophia E. Clarke (born 24 May 1994) is an English actress and singer. Her films include Altar (2014) and All My Friends Hate Me (2021). On television, she is known for her roles as young Emmeline in the BBC Two film The Thirteenth Tale (2013) and Mary, Queen of Scots in the Starz series The Serpent Queen (2022).

== Early life and education ==
Clarke was born in Hammersmith and grew up in Brackenbury Village, West London. At the age of 15, she attended Downe House boarding school in Berkshire. It was here that she decided she wanted to be an actress. She studied History of Art at Goldsmiths, University of London and later graduated with a Master of Arts degree in Film Aesthetics and Philosophy from the University of Oxford.

== Career ==
Clarke made her television debut in an episode of the 2011 action series M.I. High. She made her film debut in the 2012 adaptation of the musical Les Misérables, performing the song "Lovely Ladies".

Her first major role was as Young Emmeline in James Kent's 2013 drama film The Thirteenth Tale alongside Olivia Colman and Sophie Turner.

In 2014, she had a small role in the romantic comedy film Magic in the Moonlight. Also in 2014, she appeared in Altar, directed by Nick Willing. The filming of the movie was described as "intimate". Clarke played "Penny Hamilton".

Clarke played Maria Feodorovna in the Sky Atlantic and HBO miniseries Catherine the Great. She appeared in the 2021 comedy horror All My Friends Hate Me. The following year, she starred as Mary, Queen of Scots in the Starz historical drama The Serpent Queen.

== Personal life ==
Clarke owns a Jackadoodle dog. She has stated her favourite books are To Kill A Mockingbird by Harper Lee and Just Kids by Patti Smith.

== Filmography ==
=== Film ===
| Year | Title | Role | Notes |
|---|---|---|---|
| 2012 | Les Misérables | Ensemble 'Lovely Ladies | |
| 2013 | Mindscape | Susan Merrick | |
| 2013 | The Thirteenth Tale | Young Emmeline | |
| 2014 | Magic in the Moonlight | Wei Ling Soo's Assistant | |
| 2014 | Altar | Penny Hamilton | |
| 2015 | Out for a Walk | Anna | |
| 2018 | Teen Spirit | Alice | |
| 2021 | All My Friends Hate Me | Claire | |
| 2022 | Book of Love | Allison | |
| 2023 | Femme | Molly | |
| 2026 | Everybody Wants to Fuck Me | | |

=== Television ===
| Year | Title | Role | Notes |
|---|---|---|---|
| 2011 | M.I. High | Ricki | 1 episode |
| 2012 | Skins | Carly | 1 episode |
| 2012 | Holby City | Lucy | 1 episode |
| 2012 | A Mother's Son | Jess | 2 episodes |
| 2012 | Parade's End | 16 year old Schoolgirl | 1 episode |
| 2013 | Lightfields | Lucy | 5 episodes |
| 2014 | Law & Order: UK | Anna Sands | 1 episode |
| 2014 | The Great Fire | Frances Stewart | 2 episodes |
| 2016 | Stan Lee's Lucky Man | Sasha Terekhova | 1 episode |
| 2016 | Agatha Raisin | Beth Fortune | 1 episode |
| 2016 | Lovesick | Frankie | 1 episode |
| 2018 | Endeavour | Ruth Astor | 1 episode |
| 2019 | Catherine the Great | Princess Sophia | 2 episodes |
| 2020 | I May Destroy You | Emily | Episode: "Happy Animals" |
| 2021 | The Girl Before | Alyssia | 2 episodes |
| 2022 | The Serpent Queen | Mary, Queen of Scots | Main role |

== Stage ==
- The Flick (2018), as Rose, at Michael Pilch Studio, Oxford
