= Simon Evans (director) =

English theatre and television director, writer, and actor (born 31 December 1983)

- Born: December 31, 1983 (age 42)
- Education: Homerton College
- Occupations: Television writer, actor, director theatre director
- Works: Staged

Simon Richard Evans (born 31 December 1983) is an English theatre and television director, writer, and actor. He is best known as co-creator, writer, and producer of BBC One's Staged (2020–2022), in which he also co-stars as a fictionalised version of himself.

== Early life and education ==
Evans was raised in Oxford with his sister, actress Lucy Eaton, while his parents ran a dental practice in nearby Kidlington. He was educated at The Dragon School and Abingdon School, where his fellow alumni include Tom Hollander, Toby Jones, Hugh Laurie and members of Radiohead. He studied Education, English, Drama & the Arts at Homerton College, Cambridge.

== Career ==
As a theatre director, Evans' productions include The Dazzle (starring Andrew Scott), Bug (James Norton), The Resistible Rise of Arturo Ui (Lenny Henry), Killer Joe (Orlando Bloom) and A Day in the Death of Joe Egg (Toby Stephens and Claire Skinner).

As an actor, Evans' early roles include parts in Stig of the Dump (2002) and Lewis (2007).

Working with Secret Cinema, Simon directed immersive productions of Shawshank Redemption and Millers Crossing.

During the COVID-19 pandemic, Evans wrote, directed and co-starred in the BBC Television series Staged, playing himself, alongside exaggerated versions of the show's stars, Michael Sheen and David Tennant. The series was notable for being made using video conferencing technology. Evans had been due to rehearse Tom Stoppard's The Real Thing at Chichester when lockdown came into effect. His cinematic directorial debut, Hunter in the Dark, was also postponed.

Following Staged, Evans hosted and directed another lockdown event, a live-streamed Oxford Playhouse fundraiser, A Theatre Near You, starring Stephen Fry, Marcus Brigstocke, and Lucy Porter.

In 2025, he directed Inside No. 9 Stage/Fright written by and starring Reece Shearsmith and Steve Pemberton at the Wyndham's Theatre before touring the UK, ending with a run at the Hammersmith Apollo. The same year, Evans directed and co-wrote with Debris Stevenson a new adaptation of Edmond Rostand's Cyrano de Bergerac for the Royal Shakespeare Company starring Adrian Lester and Susannah Fielding. Following the success in Stratford-upon-Avon, the production will transfer to the Noël Coward Theatre in June 2026.

Evans is the founding director of the theatre company, Myriad Entertainment, along with Georgia Clarke-Day and David Frias Robles.

== Personal life ==
As of 2020, he lives in Noke, Oxfordshire.

== Works ==
=== Television ===
Year	Title	Role	Notes
2002	Stig of the Dump	Nathan Pinchbeck	2 episodes
2003	Crisis	Sean Bell	Short film
2007	Lewis	Dr. Martin Cook	Episode: "Expiation"
2012	John Carter	Zodangan Guard	Credited as Si Evans
2020–2022	Staged	Himself / Director	Also creator and writer

=== Theatre ===
Year	Title	Playwright	Venue
2013	The Silence of the Sea	Anthony Weigh	Trafalgar Studios, London (Donmar Trafalgar season)
2015	The Dazzle	Richard Greenberg	Found111, London
2016	Bug	Tracy Letts	Found111, London
2016	Fool for Love	Sam Shepard	Found111, London
2016	Alligators	Andrew Keatley	Hampstead Theatre, London
2017	The Resistible Rise of Arturo Ui	Bertolt Brecht	Donmar Warehouse, London
2017	The Best Man	Gore Vidal	UK tour and Playhouse Theatre, London
2018	Killer Joe	Tracy Letts	Trafalgar Studios, London
2019	A Day in the Death of Joe Egg	Peter Nichols	Trafalgar Studios, London
2025	Inside No. 9 Stage/Fright	Steve Pemberton and Reece Shearsmith	Wyndham's Theatre, London, UK tour and Hammersmith Apollo
2025	Cyrano de Bergerac	Edmond Rostand (in a new version by Simon Evans and Debris Stevenson)	Royal Shakespeare Company, Swan Theatre, Stratford-upon-Avon and Noël Coward Theatre, London
