= Sophie Simnett =

English actress (born 1997)

- Born: Sophie Hannah Kilner Simnett; 5 December 1997 (age 28); Hammersmith, West London, England
- Occupation: Actress
- Years active: 2014–present

Sophie Hannah Kilner Simnett (born 5 December 1997) is an English actress. After making minor appearances in projects including Dickensian (2015) and The Five (2016), she was cast as Skye Hart on the Disney Channel musical series The Lodge (2016–2017). Following the series, she went on to star in Netflix's Daybreak (2019) as Samaira Dean. Simnett has since appeared in numerous film projects, including Twist (2021), Refuge (2023), Words of War (2025), The Running Man (2025) and the upcoming films Everybody Wants to Fuck Me (2027) and Scorn (TBA).

== Life and career ==
Simnett was born on 5 December 1997 in Hammersmith, West London to Jonathan I. R. Simnett (born 1958) and Susan F. P. Kilner (born 1961). She has an older brother, born in 1994. At the age of seven, she began taking various film and acting courses. Simnett made her professional acting debut in Footsteps of Angels, a 2014 short film. She then appeared in the 2016 film Mum's List, as the younger version of lead character Kate.

On her eighteenth birthday, Simnett was cast in the role of Skye Hart on the Disney Channel musical drama series The Lodge after thirteen auditions. She was still attending sixth form at Putney High School whilst filming for the series. Whilst attending, she studied geography, English and drama for her A-levels. Despite missing months of classes to film for The Lodge, she attained passing grades and received offers for acting courses at numerous universities, but turned them down to focus on her acting career. She starred in The Lodge from 2016 to 2017 and was featured on two accompanying soundtracks for the series. Simnett was also a story consultant for the series. Following her role in The Lodge, she made minor appearances in the ITV1 series Endeavour, the CBS drama Ransom and the BBC drama Poldark. In 2018, she starred in the Christmas comedy film Surviving Christmas with the Relatives as Bee.

In 2019, Simnett starred in the Netflix drama series Daybreak as Samaira Dean. She later portrayed the role of Red in the 2021 film Twist, as well as appearing in Last Train to Christmas that same year. 2023 saw Simnett star in the film Refuge as Kate Pedroni. In 2024, she appeared in the Canadian miniseries So Long, Marianne. A year later, she appeared in the biographical drama film Words of War, as well as the thriller film The Running Man. Her first role of 2026 saw her appear in the ITV1 miniseries The Lady as Claudia. Later in the year, she will star in the comedy thriller film Everybody Wants to Fuck Me. She has also been cast in the short film The Intimacy Coordinator, as well as the erotic thriller film Scorn.

== Filmography ==
Key
†	Denotes films that have not yet been released

=== Film ===
Year	Film	Role	Notes
2014	Footsteps of Angels	Amber	Short film
2016	Mum's List	Teen Kate	
2018	Surviving Christmas with the Relatives	Bee	
2021	Twist	Red	
2021	Last Train to Christmas	Jenny	
2023	Refuge	Kate Pedroni	
2025	Words of War	Nina	
2025	The Running Man	Ticket Agent	
2027	Everybody Wants to Fuck Me †	Grace	Post-production
TBA	The Intimacy Coordinator †	Ella	Short film
TBA	Scorn †	Sierra	Filming

=== Television ===
Year	Show	Role	Notes
2015	Dickensian	Florence Dedlock	1 episode
2016	The Five	Scarlett	2 episodes
2016–2017	The Lodge	Skye Hart	Main role; also story consultant
2017	Endeavour	Pippa Leyton	Guest role
2017	Ransom	Sofia Bonnar	Episode: "The Artist"
2018	Poldark	Andromeda Page	2 episodes
2019	Daybreak	Samaira "Sam" Dean	Main role
2024	So Long, Marianne	Patricia	Main role
2026	The Lady	Claudia	Guest role
2026	Ted Lasso	Claudine	1 episode

=== Video games ===
Year	Title	Role	Notes
2022	Horizon Forbidden West	Demeter	Voice role
