= Jayne Hepsibah =

British milliner

Jayne Hepsibah Sullivan is a British milliner and artist. Her shop was Hepsibah Hats which sold hats to a top clientele such as members of the Royal Family, including Camilla Parker Bowles.

== Biography ==
Sullivan was educated at Central Saint Martins.

Sullivan began her fashion career running an "eclectic second-hand shop." As a milliner, Sullivan designs and sells women's headwear and hats to a top clientele such as members of the Royal Family, including Camilla Parker Bowles, and veteran actress Sheila Hancock. Her shop was Hepsibah Hats in Brackenbury Village in Hammersmith, London.

Sullivan is also an artist, and was a "fine art faker" specialising in John Singer Sargent paintings. She also teaches art techniques to amateur and professional artists and millinery skills, on a one-to-one basis .

Sullivan's middle name Hepsibah was given to her by her sister, a lawyer, who changed the name legally by deed poll.
