= Refuge (2023 film) =

Film by Renny Harlin

- Directed by: Renny Harlin
- Written by: Ben Sztajnkrycer
- Produced by: Renny Harlin; Yariv Lerner; Gary Lucchesi; Michael McKay; Robert Van Norden
- Starring: Sophie Simnett; Aston McAuley; Jason Flemyng; Johanna Harlin; Raza Jaffrey
- Cinematography: Matti Eerikäinen
- Edited by: Sergey Zhelezko
- Music by: Frederik Wiedmann
- Production companies: B2Y Productions; Revelations Entertainment; Voltage Pictures
- Distributed by: Vertical Entertainment
- Release dates: November 24, 2023 (Lithuania); April 19, 2024 (United States)
- Running time: 91 minutes
- Country: United States
- Language: English

Refuge is a 2023 American action-horror war film directed by Renny Harlin, written by Ben Sztajnkrycer, and starring Sophie Simnett, Aston McAuley, Jason Flemyng, Johanna Harlin and Raza Jaffrey. The story follows a woman whose husband has apparently been altered by supernatural forces during military deployment.

The film was released in Lithuania on November 24, 2023. It was later released in the United States on April 19, 2024, by Vertical Entertainment.

== Plot ==
Kate and Rick have a happy wedding and attest that they make each other feel safe. They become separated when Rick is called to war in Afghanistan as a military sergeant. Rick fights in a tense battle and ends up alone in a cave. He sees that the walls of the cave have strange arcane symbols on the walls, glowing as if by magic. A shadowy robed figure suddenly enters the cave behind Rick and startles him. Rick panics and reflexively turns and shoots, which apparently kills the person. He recognizes that he shot prematurely and runs over in shock to the fallen body. The person appears to be a Pashtun child who is now bleeding and dying. The child then erupts into a sandy cloud that envelopes Rick.

Kate and her father discuss their wish for Rick to return soon. Rick very abruptly appears on a bench behind Kate, but now seems emotionless. Kate tries to hug him normally, but he is withdrawn and not like his normal self. At night, Kate has disturbing dreams including of stepping with bare feet on a pile of broken glass that has been placed next to her bed, and of Rick suddenly disappearing.

A military project psychiatrist claims that Rick's condition is PTSD and connects him to a therapy group. He and other PTSD-afflicted veterans all make disturbing repulsive face masks, and wear them, as a supposed form of therapy. While having sex at home, Kate asks Rick to stop because he is being too forceful, and she is frightened to see him suddenly wearing the mask in bed.

Eventually, a friendly Imam from a local community mosque helps Rick by performing an exorcism on him.

== Cast ==
- Sophie Simnett as Kate Pedroni
- Aston McAuley as Rick Pedroni
- Jason Flemyng as Sebastian Pedroni
- Johanna Harlin as Dr. Dana Dale
- Raza Jaffrey as Ibrahim
- Shervin Alenabi as Farid
- Kaloyan Minev as Justin Matthews
- Howard Dell as Jacob
- Mila Lyutskanova as Rasha
