= Pure (British TV series) =

2019 series about OCD

- Genre: Comedy drama
- Written by: Kirstie Swain
- Directed by: Aneil Karia; Alicia Macdonald
- Starring: Charly Clive; Joe Cole
- Music by: Julia Holter
- Country of origin: United Kingdom
- No. of episodes: 6

Production
- Running time: 31–38 minutes
- Production company: Drama Republic

Original release
- Network: Channel 4
- Release: 30 January – 6 March 2019

Pure is a British television series first broadcast on 30 January 2019 on Channel 4. Based on the book of the same name by Rose Cartwright, it stars Charly Clive as 24-year-old Marnie, who has primarily obsessional obsessive–compulsive disorder (Pure O) and is plagued by disturbing sexual thoughts.

== Cast ==
- Charly Clive as Marnie
- Joe Cole as Charlie
- Kiran Sonia Sawar as Shereen
- Niamh Algar as Amber
- Anthony Welsh as Joe
- Doon Mackichan as Sarah
- Jing Lusi as Sef
- Tori Allen-Martin as Libby
- Samuel Edward-Cooke as Sam
- Olive Gray as Helen
- Jacob Collins-Levy as Benji

== Broadcast ==
The series was first broadcast in the UK on Channel 4 from January to March 2019. On 14 February 2020, it was announced that the show would not be renewed for a second series.

In the United States, the series was released on HBO Max on 27 August 2020 but was then removed on 26 August 2022. It is currently available on Amazon Prime.

In Italy, the TV series was published entirely on the RaiPlay streaming platform starting from 25 November 2020.

== Reception ==
Pure received generally positive reviews and was praised for its frank treatment of mental health issues and sexuality. On review aggregator Rotten Tomatoes, the series holds an approval rating of 80% based on 20 reviews. The website's critical consensus reads:

"Pure compassionately explore(s) the complications of compulsion, shame, and struggling to make sense of oneself."

It was described as "a masterly comedy about sex and mental health" by the Guardian. The NME gave the show 4/5 and described it as "an essential comedy that peels away the stigma of mental health", and described it as "one of 2019's standout shows so far". The Daily Telegraph called the show "an excruciating success".

According to The Guardian, people with purely obsessional OCD generally praised the show's relatability, but felt that Marnie's condition was not treated with the appropriate level of gravity.
