= Inside No. 9 Stage/Fright =

Play based on TV series

- Wyndham's Theatre, West End poster
- Original language: English
- Written by: Steve Pemberton; Reece Shearsmith
- Based on: Inside No. 9 by Steve Pemberton; Reece Shearsmith
- Genre: Black comedy Horror; Drama

Premiere
- Date: 16 January 2025
- Place: Wyndham's Theatre, London
- Directed by: Simon Evans
- https://insideno9onstage.com/

Inside No. 9 Stage/Fright is a black comedy horror play by Steve Pemberton and Reece Shearsmith, based on the BBC black comedy anthology series Inside No. 9. The play has a run time of 2 hours 20 minutes including a 20 minute interval, and features references to the TV series, including a performance of the episode "Bernie Clifton's Dressing Room" as well as new characters and storyline.

The play opened at the Wyndham's Theatre in London's West End from 18 January 2025 for a limited run until 5 April, directed by Simon Evans. Tickets for the 85 shows were released on 8 May 2024. Each performance featured a celebrity guest star, which included Lee Mack, Ian McKellen, David Tennant and Bob Mortimer. The show also toured the UK during autumn 2025, before returning to London for a final run at the Hammersmith Apollo in January 2026.

== Synopsis ==
=== Act One ===
The show begins with a cold open in which an on-stage audience are being seated before a performance of Hamlet. As Charles (Reece Shearsmith) begins to watch the performance, the members around him Angus (Steve Pemberton), Antonia and Daddy become too distracting causing Charles to comedically kill each of them before addressing the audience "Ladies and gentlemen, may I please remind you that you are in a theatre. No coughing, no eating and no mobile phones."

Shearsmith and Pemberton step in front of the red curtain to introduce Stage/Fright and explain that the theatre the show is playing is haunted as the cold open was based on an incident that happened a number of years ago where Mr Dowling was in such a state of grieving for his wife that he killed three audience members. They explain about a Grand Guignol play called La Terreur de L'aisle or "Terror at the Asylum" was performed however its lead actress Madame Belle Catron was killed during a scene that went wrong and her ghost has since haunted the theatre called Bloody Belle.

Suggesting that Mr Dowling might have seen Bloody Belle's ghost or the ghost of his late wife, they ask “For what is a ghost but a memory? A way of keeping a loved one’s memory alive? Maybe every ghost story is really just a love story.” They also explain the tradition of the ghost light before Pemberton sceptically encourages the audience to summon Bloody Belle by saying her name three times.

In the next scene, the episode "Bernie Clifton's Dressing Room" is performed. Thomas "Tommy" Shelby (Shearsmith) arrives on an empty stage with props and a ghost light to meet his former "Cheese N Crackers" double act partner Len Drake (Pemberton) to attempt practising their old routines. Shelby has moved on from showbusiness while Drake is enthusiastic about starting again. Tommy reminds Len that he owes him £25 for "Bernie Clifton's dressing room" in which Len doesn't recall what he means.

As Len goes out for a cigarette, Tommy reads a script that he has written about two burglars Eddie and Ray (played by Pemberton and Shearsmith respectively, reprising their roles from the episode "A Quiet Night In") who have mistakenly broken into the wrong house and taken a celebrity hostage (in which the celebrity is different every performance). The celebrity is tasked with an improvisational script before Ray accidentally shoots them dead. The scene ends with the celebrity taking a bow in front of the red curtain and is handed flowers.

As the scene goes back to the episode "Bernie Clifton's Dressing Room", Tommy discovers that Len has been homeless by finding his belongings who insists that he never wanted any money, just to have Tommy by his side performing again. In rehearsing their final routine "Brown Bottles" which involves Len drinking seven bottles of beer within the song, Tommy reminds Len that during one night he collapsed in Bernie Clifton's dressing room choking on his own vomit and reveals that he stopped performing because of fear that Len would kill himself due to his alcohol addiction. Len's daughter Leanne walks to find Tommy who in fact has been on his own the whole time as it is revealed that Len died and he is preparing for his funeral speech. She gives him a card with £25 from Len.

As the first half ends, the ghost light starts flickering. After Tommy leaves the stage, Bloody Belle appears.

=== Act Two ===
The second act begins with a performance of La Terreur de L'aisle. Suzette arrives at Dr. Goudron's (Pemberton) asylum to treat for her migraines and is greeted by Cragg, one of the nurses and Hugo (Shearsmith), one of the insane patients. Goudron offers a pain-free hypnotic method for operation by which he demonstrates by convincing Hugo to surgically remove his own leg.

As violence and chaos ensures, Abby, a theatre usher and aspiring actress, enters with a coffee order ruining what is in fact a rehearsal for the play. Rehearsals continue using a camera and a screen on stage as Abby discusses the curse of Bloody Belle with the director Marcus (and Hugo), Vincent Gannymeade (Goudron) and the play's celebrity leading actress Sherrie Leeks (Suzette).

After the rehearsal and theatre has been emptied and the ghost light has been left on, Sherrie and Abby stay behind to rehearse the play's lines. They begin to see movements on the camera and screen, which Sherrie uses the light on the camera to guide herself around the empty theatre to investigate the noises. Having lost Abby, she makes her way back onto the stage where she is frightened away by seemingly the ghost of Bloody Belle, which turns out to be Abby pretending in a ruse by her and Marcus to make Sherrie quit the play and attract publicity. As Marcus rejects the idea of Abby taking over from Sherrie, Abbie becomes possessed and strangles him to death as the real Bloody Belle appears.

In what is seemingly the curtain call for Stage/Fright, the company take their bow before Pemberton steps forward to thank the audience for their support and paying tribute to Shearsmith who had in fact died in rehearsals before the show's run began, revealing that Toby, his understudy, had played Shearsmith's roles in the performance, ending with applause and an obituary photo of Shearsmith on the screen.

After the curtain falls, the audience can still hear Pemberton on his microphone who walks onstage during the show's reset and is killed by a falling stage light. The curtain rises to see him being greeted by Shearsmith's ghost handing him a coffee, much to his annoyance that Pemberton still continued to go ahead with the show and that the "twist" was that he was dead.

With nothing to do but to haunt the theatre, Pemberton exits the stage whilst Shearsmith turns to the audience revealing that the falling stage light was meant for Toby. The show ends with Shearsmith, Pemberton and the company performing "Tears of Laughter" (the finale number from the episode "Bernie Clifton's Dressing Room") in what is their memorial service all dressed in white on Cloud 9.

== Production history ==
=== West End (2025) ===
The play opened at the Wyndham's Theatre in London's West End on 16 January 2025 and ran until 5 April, starring Pemberton and Shearsmith. It was directed by Simon Evans featuring set design by Grace Smart, costume design by Yves Barre, lighting design by Neil Austin, sound design by Ed Lewis, illusions by John Bulleid and video and projection design by Duncan Mclean.

=== UK tour (2025) ===
Following the success of the West End run, the show began touring the UK in autumn 2025, starting at Churchill Theatre, Bromley (5–6 September) before touring to Milton Keynes Theatre (9–13 September), Sunderland Empire Theatre (16–20 September), Marlowe Theatre, Canterbury (23–26 September), The Alexandra, Birmingham (7–11 October), Manchester Opera House (14–18 October), New Victoria Theatre, Woking (21–25 October), Hull New Theatre (28 October–1 November), New Theatre Oxford (4–8 November), Regent Theatre, Stoke-on-Trent (11–15 November), Liverpool Empire Theatre (18–22 November) and Edinburgh Playhouse (25–29 November) before returning to The Alexandra, Birmingham (2–6 December) due to popular demand.

=== Hammersmith (2026) ===
Following the UK tour, the show played a run for the final time at the Eventim Apollo in Hammersmith, London from 2 to 6 January 2026. The final celebrity guest star was Bernie Clifton (who the episode Bernie Clifton's Dressing Room performed in the show is named after).

== Cast ==
Character	West End	UK tour	Hammersmith
Character	2025		2026
Himself Angus Len Shelby (Crackers) Eddie Vincent Gannymeade (Goudron)	Steve Pemberton	Steve Pemberton	Steve Pemberton
Himself Charles Tommy Drake (Cheese) Ray Marcus de Lorde (Hugo/Director)	Reece Shearsmith	Reece Shearsmith	Reece Shearsmith
Leanne Sherrie Leeks (Suzette)	Miranda Hennessy	Miranda Hennessy	Miranda Hennessy
Antonia Maggie Philbine (Cragg)	Anna Francolini	Sarah Moyle	Sarah Moyle
Abby	Gaby French	Gaby French	Gaby French
Daddy Jack Foundling (Warden)	Bhav Joshi	Bhav Joshi	Bhav Joshi
Bloody Belle Lisa Smelling (Madame Goudron)	Rebecca Bainbridge	Rebecca Bainbridge	Rebecca Bainbridge
Toby	Toby Manley	Toby Manley	Toby Manley

== Dates and guest stars ==
Location	Date	Guest star
West End (2025)
Wyndham's Theatre, London (West End)	Thursday 16 January	Jim Howick
Wyndham's Theatre, London (West End)	Friday 17 January	Ralf Little
Wyndham's Theatre, London (West End)	Saturday 18 January	Kevin Eldon
Wyndham's Theatre, London (West End)	Monday 20 January	David Morrissey
Wyndham's Theatre, London (West End)	Tuesday 21 January	Marc Wootton
Wyndham's Theatre, London (West End)	Wednesday 22 January	Adrian Dunbar
Wyndham's Theatre, London (West End)	Thursday 23 January	Nick Mohammed
Wyndham's Theatre, London (West End)	Friday 24 January	Katherine Parkinson
Wyndham's Theatre, London (West End)	Saturday 25 January (matinee)	Gary Kemp
Wyndham's Theatre, London (West End)	Saturday 25 January (evening)	Martin Freeman
Wyndham's Theatre, London (West End)	Monday 27 January	Matthew Kelly
Wyndham's Theatre, London (West End)	Tuesday 28 January	Lee Mack
Wyndham's Theatre, London (West End)	Wednesday 29 January	Alexander Armstrong
Wyndham's Theatre, London (West End)	Thursday 30 January	Daniel Mays
Wyndham's Theatre, London (West End)	Friday 31 January	Mathew Baynton
Wyndham's Theatre, London (West End)	Saturday 1 February (matinee)	Les Dennis
Wyndham's Theatre, London (West End)	Saturday 1 February (evening)	David Harewood
Wyndham's Theatre, London (West End)	Monday 3 February	Tamsin Greig
Wyndham's Theatre, London (West End)	Tuesday 4 February	Monica Dolan
Wyndham's Theatre, London (West End)	Wednesday 5 February	Ophelia Lovibond
Wyndham's Theatre, London (West End)	Thursday 6 February (matinee)	Julian Rhind-Tutt
Wyndham's Theatre, London (West End)	Thursday 6 February (evening)	Paterson Joseph
Wyndham's Theatre, London (West End)	Friday 7 February	Mel Giedroyc
Wyndham's Theatre, London (West End)	Saturday 8 February (matinee)	Denis Lawson
Wyndham's Theatre, London (West End)	Saturday 8 February (evening)	Sue Perkins
Wyndham's Theatre, London (West End)	Monday 10 February	Dara Ó Briain
Wyndham's Theatre, London (West End)	Tuesday 11 February	Rory Kinnear
Wyndham's Theatre, London (West End)	Wednesday 12 February	Matt Berry
Wyndham's Theatre, London (West End)	Thursday 13 February (matinee)	Mackenzie Crook
Wyndham's Theatre, London (West End)	Thursday 13 February (evening)	Mark Bonnar
Wyndham's Theatre, London (West End)	Friday 14 February	Phil Daniels
Wyndham's Theatre, London (West End)	Saturday 15 February (matinee)	Emilia Fox
Wyndham's Theatre, London (West End)	Saturday 15 February (evening)	Sarah Hadland
Wyndham's Theatre, London (West End)	Monday 17 February	Gemma Whelan
Wyndham's Theatre, London (West End)	Tuesday 18 February	Joe Thomas
Wyndham's Theatre, London (West End)	Wednesday 19 February	Lenny Henry
Wyndham's Theatre, London (West End)	Thursday 20 February (matinee)	Mathew Horne
Wyndham's Theatre, London (West End)	Thursday 20 February (evening)	Nigel Planer
Wyndham's Theatre, London (West End)	Friday 21 February	Charlie Higson
Wyndham's Theatre, London (West End)	Saturday 22 February (matinee)	Morgana Robinson
Wyndham's Theatre, London (West End)	Saturday 22 February (evening)	Mark Gatiss
Wyndham's Theatre, London (West End)	Monday 24 February	Rob Brydon
Wyndham's Theatre, London (West End)	Tuesday 25 February	Gareth Malone
Wyndham's Theatre, London (West End)	Wednesday 26 February	Liza Tarbuck
Wyndham's Theatre, London (West End)	Thursday 27 February (matinee)	Bob Mortimer
Wyndham's Theatre, London (West End)	Thursday 27 February (evening)	Julian Clary
Wyndham's Theatre, London (West End)	Friday 28 February	Stephen Merchant
Wyndham's Theatre, London (West End)	Saturday 1 March (matinee)	Robin Askwith
Wyndham's Theatre, London (West End)	Saturday 1 March (evening)	Matt Lucas
Wyndham's Theatre, London (West End)	Monday 3 March	Jane Horrocks
Wyndham's Theatre, London (West End)	Tuesday 4 March	Joel Dommett
Wyndham's Theatre, London (West End)	Wednesday 5 March	Alex Horne
Wyndham's Theatre, London (West End)	Thursday 6 March (matinee)	Micky Flanagan
Wyndham's Theatre, London (West End)	Thursday 6 March (evening)	Josh Widdicombe
Wyndham's Theatre, London (West End)	Friday 7 March	Joe Pasquale
Wyndham's Theatre, London (West End)	Saturday 8 March (matinee)	Paul Chuckle
Wyndham's Theatre, London (West End)	Saturday 8 March (evening)	Michael Sheen
Wyndham's Theatre, London (West End)	Monday 10 March	Stewart Lee
Wyndham's Theatre, London (West End)	Tuesday 11 March	Chris McCausland
Wyndham's Theatre, London (West End)	Wednesday 12 March	David Walliams
Wyndham's Theatre, London (West End)	Thursday 13 March (matinee)	Pauline McLynn
Wyndham's Theatre, London (West End)	Thursday 13 March (evening)	Richard Osman
Wyndham's Theatre, London (West End)	Friday 14 March	Tamzin Outhwaite
Wyndham's Theatre, London (West End)	Saturday 15 March (matinee)	Clive Anderson
Wyndham's Theatre, London (West End)	Saturday 15 March (evening)	Stephen Fry
Wyndham's Theatre, London (West End)	Monday 17 March	Paul Merton
Wyndham's Theatre, London (West End)	Tuesday 18 March	Mark Addy
Wyndham's Theatre, London (West End)	Wednesday 19 March	Adam Buxton
Wyndham's Theatre, London (West End)	Thursday 20 March (matinee)	Elaine Paige
Wyndham's Theatre, London (West End)	Thursday 20 March (evening)	Jason Manford
Wyndham's Theatre, London (West End)	Friday 21 March	Romesh Ranganathan
Wyndham's Theatre, London (West End)	Saturday 22 March (matinee)	Neil Morrissey
Wyndham's Theatre, London (West End)	Saturday 22 March (evening)	Paul Whitehouse
Wyndham's Theatre, London (West End)	Monday 24 March	Simon Pegg
Wyndham's Theatre, London (West End)	Tuesday 25 March	Meera Syal
Wyndham's Theatre, London (West End)	Wednesday 26 March	Robert Lindsay
Wyndham's Theatre, London (West End)	Thursday 27 March (matinee)	Danny Dyer
Wyndham's Theatre, London (West End)	Thursday 27 March (evening)	Su Pollard
Wyndham's Theatre, London (West End)	Friday 28 March	Danny Baker
Wyndham's Theatre, London (West End)	Saturday 29 March (matinee)	Ross Noble
Wyndham's Theatre, London (West End)	Saturday 29 March (evening)	Professor Brian Cox
Wyndham's Theatre, London (West End)	Monday 31 March	David Tennant
Wyndham's Theatre, London (West End)	Tuesday 1 April	Sandi Toksvig
Wyndham's Theatre, London (West End)	Wednesday 2 April	Sophie Willan
Wyndham's Theatre, London (West End)	Thursday 3 April (matinee)	Miles Jupp
Wyndham's Theatre, London (West End)	Thursday 3 April (evening)	Phoebe Waller-Bridge
Wyndham's Theatre, London (West End)	Friday 4 April	Ian McKellen
Wyndham's Theatre, London (West End)	Saturday 5 April (matinee)	Louis Theroux
Wyndham's Theatre, London (West End)	Saturday 5 April (evening)	Jonathan Ross
UK tour (2025)
Churchill Theatre, Bromley	Friday 5 September	Richard Herring
Churchill Theatre, Bromley	Saturday 6 September (matinee)	Griff Rhys Jones
Churchill Theatre, Bromley	Saturday 6 September (evening)	Debbie McGee
Milton Keynes Theatre	Tuesday 9 September	Kevin Whately
Milton Keynes Theatre	Wednesday 10 September	Sara Pascoe
Milton Keynes Theatre	Thursday 11 September	Roisin Conaty
Milton Keynes Theatre	Friday 12 September	Greg Rutherford
Milton Keynes Theatre	Saturday 13 September (matinee)	Jon Richardson
Milton Keynes Theatre	Saturday 13 September (evening)	Joe Pasquale
Sunderland Empire Theatre	Tuesday 16 September	Miss Rory (Dan Cunningham)
Sunderland Empire Theatre	Wednesday 17 September	Chris Ramsey
Sunderland Empire Theatre	Thursday 18 September	Rosie Ramsey
Sunderland Empire Theatre	Friday 19 September	Jill Halfpenny
Sunderland Empire Theatre	Saturday 20 September (matinee)	Joe McElderry
Sunderland Empire Theatre	Saturday 20 September (evening)	Tim Healy
Marlowe Theatre, Canterbury	Tuesday 23 September	Natalie Cassidy
Marlowe Theatre, Canterbury	Wednesday 24 September	Lou Sanders
Marlowe Theatre, Canterbury	Thursday 25 September (matinee)	Vic Reeves
Marlowe Theatre, Canterbury	Thursday 25 September (evening)	Sarah Hadland
Marlowe Theatre, Canterbury	Friday 26 September	Peter Andre
The Alexandra, Birmingham	Tuesday 7 October	Adrian Chiles
The Alexandra, Birmingham	Wednesday 8 October	Lesley Joseph
The Alexandra, Birmingham	Thursday 9 October	Russell Kane
The Alexandra, Birmingham	Friday 10 October	Gary Wilmot
The Alexandra, Birmingham	Saturday 11 October (matinee)	Maureen Lipman
The Alexandra, Birmingham	Saturday 11 October (evening)	Toyah Willcox
Manchester Opera House	Tuesday 14 October	John Thomson
Manchester Opera House	Wednesday 15 October	Ralf Little
Manchester Opera House	Thursday 16 October (matinee)	Scarlett Moffatt
Manchester Opera House	Thursday 16 October (evening)	Paddy McGuinness
Manchester Opera House	Friday 17 October	Stan Boardman
Manchester Opera House	Saturday 18 October (matinee)	Les Dennis
Manchester Opera House	Saturday 18 October (evening)	Antony Cotton
New Victoria Theatre, Woking	Tuesday 21 October	Bobby Davro
New Victoria Theatre, Woking	Wednesday 22 October	Jimmy Tarbuck
New Victoria Theatre, Woking	Thursday 23 October	Tony Blackburn
New Victoria Theatre, Woking	Friday 24 October	Rick Astley
New Victoria Theatre, Woking	Saturday 25 October (matinee)	Ranj Singh
New Victoria Theatre, Woking	Saturday 26 October (evening)	Basil Brush
New Theatre, Hull	Tuesday 28 October	Tommy Cannon
New Theatre, Hull	Wednesday 29 October	Paul Chuckle
New Theatre, Hull	Thursday 30 October (matinee)	Kofi Smiles
New Theatre, Hull	Thursday 30 October (evening)	Christopher Dean
New Theatre, Hull	Friday 31 October	John Shuttleworth
New Theatre, Hull	Saturday 1 November (matinee)	Mark Addy
New Theatre, Hull	Saturday 1 November (evening)	Peter Levy
New Theatre, Oxford	Tuesday 4 November	Will Young
New Theatre, Oxford	Wednesday 5 November	Basil Brush
New Theatre, Oxford	Thursday 6 November	Kevin Bishop
New Theatre, Oxford	Friday 7 November	Jonathan Ross
New Theatre, Oxford	Saturday 8 November (matinee)	Dom Joly
New Theatre, Oxford	Saturday 8 November (evening)	Katherine Parkinson
Regent Theatre, Stoke-on-Trent	Tuesday 11 November	Clinton Baptiste
Regent Theatre, Stoke-on-Trent	Wednesday 12 November	Phil Daniels
Regent Theatre, Stoke-on-Trent	Thursday 13 November	Keith Brymer Jones
Regent Theatre, Stoke-on-Trent	Friday 14 November	Nick Hancock
Regent Theatre, Stoke-on-Trent	Saturday 15 November (matinee)	Jack Carroll
Regent Theatre, Stoke-on-Trent	Saturday 15 November (evening)	Mawaan Rizwan
Liverpool Empire Theatre	Tuesday 18 November	Claire Sweeney
Liverpool Empire Theatre	Wednesday 19 November	Sian Gibson
Liverpool Empire Theatre	Thursday 20 November	Crissy Rock
Liverpool Empire Theatre	Friday 21 November	Johnny Vegas
Liverpool Empire Theatre	Saturday 22 November (matinee)	Michael Starke
Liverpool Empire Theatre	Saturday 22 November (evening)	Mick Miller
Edinburgh Playhouse	Tuesday 25 November	Jonathan Watson
Edinburgh Playhouse	Wednesday 26 November	Susan Calman
Edinburgh Playhouse	Thursday 27 November	Frankie Boyle
Edinburgh Playhouse	Friday 28 November	Peter Mullan
Edinburgh Playhouse	Saturday 29 November (matinee)	John MacKay
Edinburgh Playhouse	Saturday 29 November (evening)	Sanjeev Kohli
The Alexandra, Birmingham	Tuesday 2 December	Sally Lindsay
The Alexandra, Birmingham	Wednesday 3 December	Nick Hancock
The Alexandra, Birmingham	Thursday 4 December (matinee)	Alistair McGowan
The Alexandra, Birmingham	Thursday 4 December (evening)	Sian Gibson
The Alexandra, Birmingham	Friday 5 December	Faye Tozer
The Alexandra, Birmingham	Saturday 6 December (matinee)	Joe Lycett
The Alexandra, Birmingham	Saturday 6 December (evening)	Peter Davison
Final shows (2026)
Eventim Apollo, London (Hammersmith)	Friday 2 January	Sanjeev Bhaskar
Eventim Apollo, London (Hammersmith)	Saturday 3 January (matinee)	Bill Bailey
Eventim Apollo, London (Hammersmith)	Saturday 3 January (evening)	Joe Marler
Eventim Apollo, London (Hammersmith)	Sunday 4 January (matinee)	Stephen Mulhern
Eventim Apollo, London (Hammersmith)	Monday 5 January	Rob Brydon
Eventim Apollo, London (Hammersmith)	Tuesday 6 January	Bernie Clifton

== Awards and nominations ==
Year	Award	Category	Result
2025	Laurence Olivier Awards	Best Entertainment or Comedy Play	Nominated
