= Altar (2014 film) =

2014 British horror thriller film

- Written by: Nick Willing
- Directed by: Nick Willing
- Starring: Olivia Williams; Matthew Modine; Antonia Clarke; Adam Thomas Wright
- Music by: Simon Boswell
- Country of origin: United Kingdom
- Original language: English

Production
- Producers: Michele Camarda; Robert Halmi Sr.; Robert Halmi Jr.; Jim Reeve; Hugo Heppell
- Cinematography: Jan Richter-Friis
- Running time: 95 minutes
- Production company: Great Point Media

Original release
- Network: Channel 5
- Release: 27 December 2014

Altar (also known as The Haunting of Radcliffe House) is a 2014 British horror thriller film written and directed by Nick Willing. It follows a family who move into a dilapidated old manor house on the Yorkshire Moors, only to discover that it has a dark past. The film stars Olivia Williams, Matthew Modine, Antonia Clarke, and Adam Thomas Wright.

== Plot ==
Renovation expert Meg Hamilton, her husband Alec, and their children Penny and Harper move into a large country house on the Yorkshire Moors to supervise its restoration from a dilapidated B&B to its original Victorian grandeur. When Meg loses her London renovation team after an accident, then loses a local Yorkshire team too superstitious to continue, she is forced to carry on alone. The discovery of a secret attic room, a Rosicrucian mosaic, a bricked-up cellar, and many other unexplainable events gradually convince the Hamilton family that they are not only restoring the house, but also its original Victorian owners who died 150 years ago. Before they can escape, the house and its former occupants force them to spend one last, terrifying night under its roof.

== Cast ==
- Olivia Williams as Meg Hamilton
- Matthew Modine as Alec Hamilton
- Antonia Clarke as Penny Hamilton
- Adam Thomas Wright as Harper Hamilton
- Steve Oram as Nigel Lean
- Rebecca Calder as Isabella
- Stephen Chance as Chares Kendrick Walker
- Richard Dillane as Greg

== Release ==
Altar premiered in the UK on 27 December 2014 as The Haunting of Radcliffe House on Channel 5. Cinedigm and Great Point Media released the film on 17 February 2015 in the United States.
