= Anna Lundberg =

Swedish actress

- Lundberg in 2023
- Born: 20 August 1994 (age 32); Helsingborg, Sweden
- Education: American Academy of Dramatic Arts
- Occupation: Actress
- Partner: Michael Sheen (2019–present)
- Children: 2

Anna Lundberg (born 20 August 1994) is a Swedish actress. She is best known for playing herself in the BBC TV series Staged.

== Early life and education ==
Lundberg was born in Helsingborg, Sweden. She completed a three-year theatre program in Sweden before moving to the United Kingdom to further her studies. In the UK, she trained at the London Academy of Music and Dramatic Art (LAMDA) and the Guildford School of Acting. She later attended the American Academy of Dramatic Arts in New York, graduating in 2018.

== Career ==
After her graduation, Lundberg joined the NY Academy Company and performed in various stage productions, including Othello, Spring Awakening, and Gloria.

In 2020, she played a fictionalised version of herself alongside partner Michael Sheen in the television series Staged. She reprised her role in the second and third series, released in 2021 and 2022. In 2021, she appeared in the film Last Train to Christmas.

In 2022, she voiced the character Marion in an episode of The Sandman. In 2024, it was announced that Lundberg would be playing Jexabel Glyce in the Doctor Who audio drama Jenny: The Doctor’s Daughter - Saving Time, which was released in October. She is set to return in the fourth series, Zero Chill, in 2027.

In 2026, it was announced that Lundberg would voice Fenella Newt in the kids animated series Ivy Newt. She also lent her voice to Nivora in the English version of the video game Wuthering Waves. From December to January 2027, Lundberg will be starring in Monument, written by Rhys Warrington and directed by Francesca Goodridge at the Royal Court Theatre and Sherman Theatre in Wales.

== Personal life ==
Lundberg has been in a relationship with Welsh actor Michael Sheen since 2019. They have two daughters.

== Filmography ==
Film

Year	Title	Role	Notes	Ref.
2021	Last Train to Christmas	Astrid		

Television

Year	Title	Role	Notes	Ref.
2020–2022	Staged	Anna Lundberg	19 episodes	
2021	Gogglebox	Herself	Episode: #18.5	
2022	The Sandman	Marion (voice)	Episode: “A Dream of a Thousand Cats”	
2025	Michael McIntyre’s Big Show	Herself	Episode: #8.2	
2026	Celebrity Gogglebox	Herself	2 episodes	
2026	Live from the Lycett Arms	Herself	Episode: #1.2	
TBA	Ivy Newt	Fenella Newt, Queen of the Sand Witches (voice)		

Audio

Year	Title	Role	Notes	Ref.
2024	Jenny: The Doctor’s Daughter - Saving Time	Jexabel Glyce		
2027	Jenny: The Doctor’s Daughter - Zero Chill	Jexabel Glyce		

Video Games

Year	Title	Role	Notes	Ref.
2026	Wuthering Waves	Nivora	Voice	

== Stage ==
Year	Title	Role	Notes	Ref.
2018	Othello	Desdemona	with the NY Academy Company	
2018	Gloria	Ani/Sasha/Callie	with the NY Academy Company	
2018	Spring Awakening	Frau Gabor	with the NY Academy Company	
2018	Star-Spangled	Gussy	with the NY Academy Company	
2018	The Richard Project	Queen Margaret	with the NY Academy Company	
2019	The Moors	Agatha	with the NY Academy Company	
2026-27	Monument		Royal Court Theatre and Sherman Theatre	
