= Everybody Wants to Fuck Me =

2026 British film by Jonathan Schey

- Directed by: Jonathan Schey
- Written by: Jonathan Schey
- Produced by: Cecilia Frugiuele; Olivier Kaempfer; Tom Ackerley; Douglas Cox; Yemi Adegbulu
- Starring: Taron Egerton; Jessica Henwick; Mia McKenna-Bruce; Charly Clive; Herbert Nordrum; Sophie Simnett
- Cinematography: Kate Reid
- Edited by: Joe Randall-Cutler
- Music by: Anna Meredith
- Production companies: StudioCanal; LuckyChap Entertainment; Film4; Parkville Pictures
- Distributed by: StudioCanal (France and United Kingdom)
- Release date: September 11, 2026 (TIFF)
- Running time: 97 minutes
- Countries: France; United Kingdom; United States
- Language: English

Everybody Wants to Fuck Me is a 2026 comedy thriller film written and directed by Jonathan Schey. The film stars Taron Egerton as Adam Samuels, an art gallery employee and performative male who seduces women for a night and discards them the next day. After an encounter with Classics student Sofia (Jessica Henwick), every woman in his vicinity suddenly becomes uncontrollably attracted to him, stalking him. Everybody also stars Mia McKenna-Bruce, Charly Clive, Herbert Nordrum, and Sophie Simnett.

The film premiered at the Toronto International Film Festival in September 2026 and is scheduled for a theatrical release in 2027. It received mixed reviews from critics.

== Plot ==
Adam Samuels (Taron Egerton) is the only male employee at an art gallery. He uses his carefully crafted "nice guy" persona to seduce women and immediately leave them the next day. After an encounter with Classics student Sofia (Jessica Henwick) at a bar, he finds that every woman around him becomes uncontrollably attracted to him, to the point of stalking him.

== Cast ==
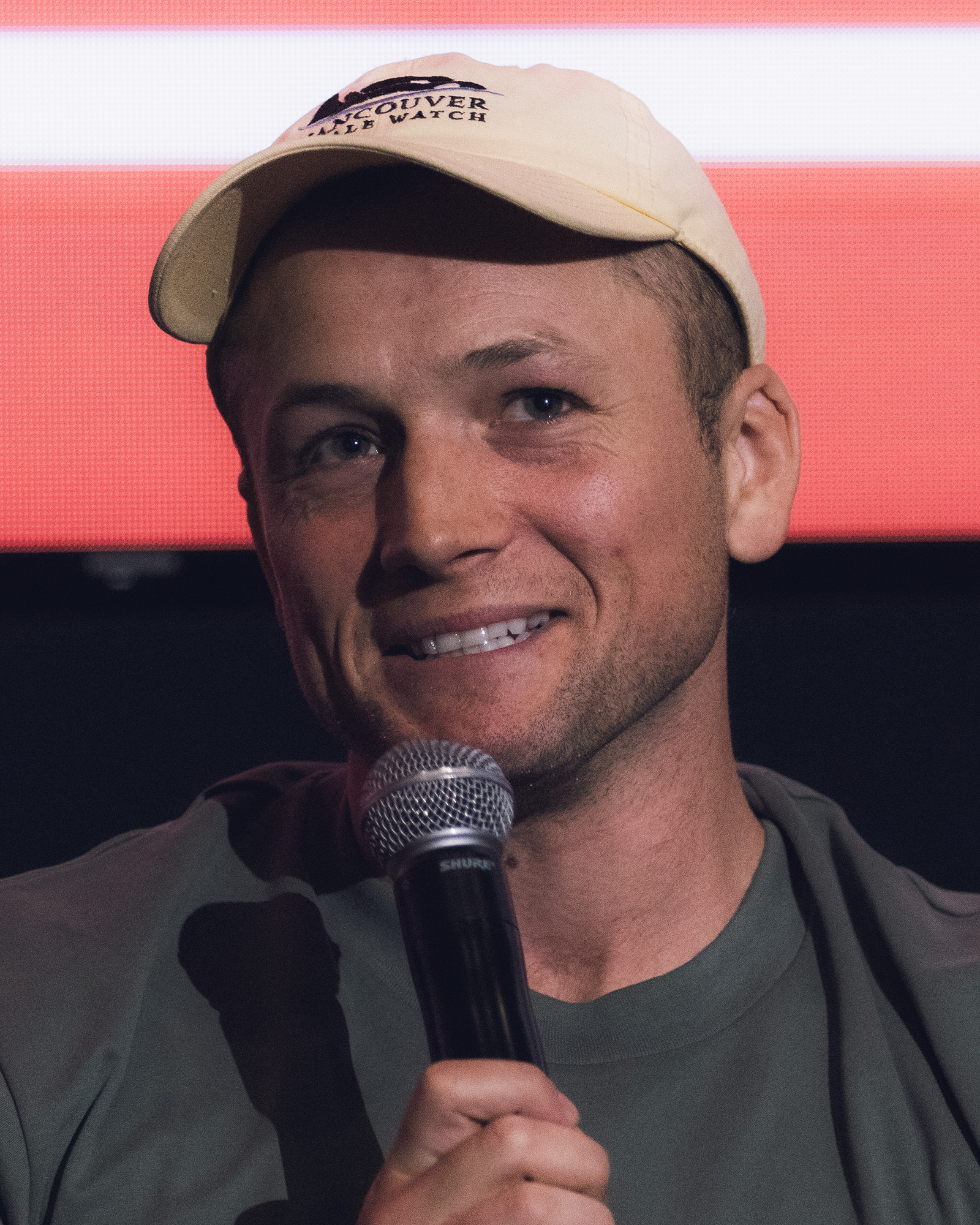
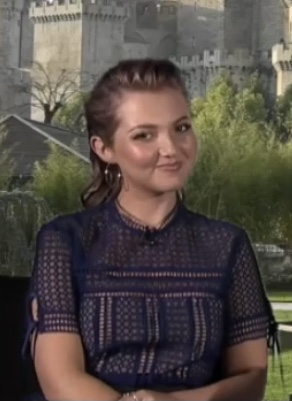
(Left to right) Taron Egerton, Jessica Henwick, Mia McKenna-Bruce, Charly Clive
- Taron Egerton as Adam Samuels, an art gallery employee and performative male
- Jessica Henwick as Sofia, a Classics student approached by Adam at a bar, who later causes the main plot to happen
- Mia McKenna-Bruce
- Charly Clive as Emma, Adam's best friend who is a lesbian
- Herbert Nordrum
- Sophie Simnett as Grace
- Antonia Clarke

== Production ==
In October 2025, it was announced that a comedy thriller film written and directed by Jonathan Schey was in pre-production, with Taron Egerton and Jessica Henwick starring. Principal photography began in November in London, with Mia McKenna-Bruce, Charly Clive, Herbert Nordrum, and Sophie Simnett joining the cast.

== Release ==
In April 2026, a teaser for the film was shown on Day 1 of CinemaCon at Las Vegas. IndieWire called it the "best thing we saw" at the event. Everybody Wants to Fuck Me is scheduled to be released theatrically in 2027. On September 11, the film premiered at the Toronto International Film Festival. According to IndieWire, its theatrical release is planned for 2027.

== Reception ==
On the review aggregator website Rotten Tomatoes, 63% of 32 critics' reviews are positive, with an average rating of 6.7/10. Metacritic, which uses a weighted average, assigned the film a score of 58 out of 100, based on 11 critics, indicating "mixed or average" reviews.

Early reviews compared the film to Obsession and Get Out. Among positive reactions, The Guardian’s Benjamin Lee felt the film was “hugely entertaining mix of dark comedy and stalker thriller.” Likewise, Guy Lodge of Variety described it as a “lively, zesty, thoroughly enjoyable comedy.” Screen Daily's Robert Daniels gave the film a negative review, but commended Egerton's performance.
