= Charly Clive =

English actress and comedian (born 1993)

- Clive in 2026
- Born: 10 February 1993 (age 33)
- Occupation: Actress • Comedian
- Years active: 2018–present

Charly Clive (born 10 February 1993) is an English actress and comedian. On television, she is known for her roles in the Channel 4 series Pure (2019), the Sky Max series The Lazarus Project (2022–2023) and the HBO series Rooster (2026). Her films include All My Friends Hate Me (2021).

Clive was named a 2018 Screen International Star of Tomorrow and a 2026 Brit to Watch by Variety.

== Early life and education ==
Clive was born to an English father and a Mexican-American mother and grew up in a village in Oxfordshire, attending St. Helen's and St. Katharine's School, a private school in Abingdon. She attended the American Academy of Dramatic Art in New York City, graduating in 2014.

That December, at age 23, Clive was diagnosed with a macroadenoma. She wrote, alongside Ellen Robertson, about her experience in a sellout comedy stage show called Britney, which was named after her brain tumour, which in turn was named after singer Britney Spears: “I needed it to be iconic, and there is nobody more iconic than Britney. If I was going to get a tumour, then she'd have to be a little bit fabulous, and so Britney was the one."

== Career ==
In 2019, Clive secured a main role as Marnie MacCauley, a young woman with obsessive-compulsive disorder who is plagued by disturbing sexual thoughts, in the Channel 4 series Pure.

In 2021, she starred in the premise pilot for an eponymous television sitcom adaptation of Britney aired on BBC Three in November that year, although it was not picked up to series.

Since 2026, she has starred in the HBO comedy series Rooster alongside Steve Carell.

== Acting credits ==
Key
†	Denotes films that have not yet been released

=== Film ===
Year	Title	Role	Notes
2018	What in the World		Short Film
2021	All My Friends Hate Me	Sonia	
2027	Everybody Wants to Fuck Me †	Emma	Post-production

=== Television ===
Year	Title	Role	Notes
2019	Pure	Marnie MacCauley	Main role
2021	Britney	Charly	Premise pilot (also creator, writer, associate producer)
2022–2023	The Lazarus Project	Sarah Leigh	Main role
2025	Mitchell and Webb Are Not Helping	Additional cast	2 episodes
2026	Rooster	Katie Russo	Main role
2026	Break Clause	Frances	5 episodes

=== Stage ===
Year	Title	Role	Venue	Notes
2016	Britney	herself	Edinburgh Fringe, Edinburgh	also co-writer and producer
2019	Britney	herself	Soho Theatre, London	also co-writer and producer
2026	Relics	Michelle	Lyric Hammersmith	

=== Music video ===
Year	Artist	Video	Album
2020	Elderbrook	Numb	Why Do We Shake In The Cold?
2024	Jazz Emu	I Could Get Into It	Ego Death
