= Mica Ricketts =

British actress

Mica Rickets
- Born: 1998/1999; Nottingham, England
- Occupation: Actress
- Years active: 2020–present

Mica Ricketts (born 1998/1999) is an English actress. On television, she had a recurring role in the BBC One comedy Here We Go (2020–present). Her films include Steve McQueen's World War II film Blitz (2024).

== Early life ==
She was born in Nottingham. At the age of 15 years-old she joined Television Workshop in Nottingham.

== Career ==
Her television roles have included Bulletproof for Sky and Best Interests for BBC One. She has a recurring role as Maya Hughes, girlfriend of Amy Jessop (Freya Parks), in long-running Tom Basden-written family comedy series Here We Go for BBC One.

In June 2024 she was named one of Screen Daily's Stars of Tomorrow. That year, she could be seen as Jess in scenes with Elliott Heffernan, playing Stephen Graham's daughter and Kathy Burke's niece in the London-set WW2 drama film Blitz, directed by Steve McQueen.

== Personal life ==
Her name is pronounced "Mi-Sha". She is of Jamaican descent. In 2024, she moved from Nottinghamshire to London.

== Filmography ==
| Year | Title | Role | Notes |
|---|---|---|---|
| 2020 | As Dead as it Gets | Amber | Film |
| 2020- | Here We Go | Maya | Recurring role |
| 2020 | Shepherd's Delight | Tanya | 2 episodes |
| 2020 | Bulletproof | Leanne | 1 episode |
| 2020 | Vera | Liza | 1 episode |
| 2021 | Doctors | Selina Barnett | 1 episode |
| 2023 | Best Interests | Hannah | 3 episodes |
| 2024 | Blitz | Jess | Feature film |
