= Tom Stourton =

British actor

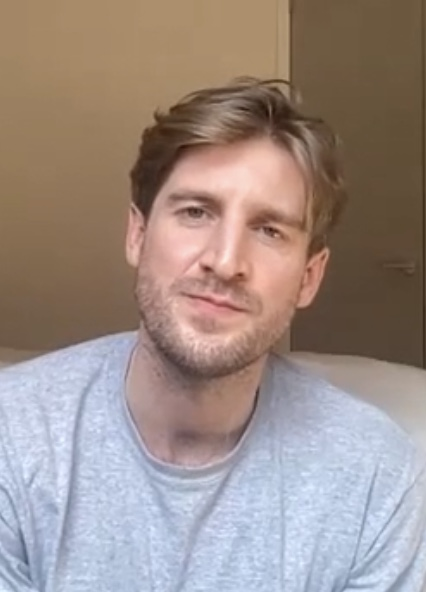
- Stourton in 2022
- Born: Thomas Edward Alexander Stourton
- Occupations: Actor; comedian; writer
- Years active: 1994–1996; 2009–present
- Relatives: Ivo Stourton (brother); Edward Stourton (father)

Thomas Edward Alexander Stourton is an English actor, comedian and writer.

== Career ==
Stourton started his career as a comedian at university, performing in the web-series "High Renaissance Man" that he co-wrote with Tom Palmer. After university, the pair continued to write and perform together as comedy duo Totally Tom.

He starred alongside Charlotte Ritchie in the BBC Three sitcom Siblings, which broadcast from 2014 to 2016.

As of 2014, he joined the cast of Thomas & Friends as the voices of Duncan, Rex, Terence, Alfie (season 23 onward), and the Fat Clergyman (UK/US).

In 2015, he became one of the regular cast of CBBC's sketch comedy Horrible Histories, which was first broadcast in 2015. Stourton also played a Viking nicknamed 'Lofty' in the Doctor Who episode "The Girl Who Died".

In 2018, Stourton played the role of Edward Snowden in the comedy film The Spy Who Dumped Me, featuring Mila Kunis, Kate McKinnon and Justin Theroux. That same year he began playing the recurring role of Robbie, the rival agent, across all three series of Stath Lets Flats.

In 2019, he played Percy in the comedy film Horrible Histories: The Movie – Rotten Romans, which is based on the television programme Horrible Histories.

In 2021, he co-wrote and starred in the feature film All My Friends Hate Me. That year he also appeared in the BBC pilot Dreaming Whilst Black, guest starred in episodes of Trying, Buffering and Mood, as well as providing voices for the rebooted series of Spitting Image.

In 2022, he played various characters in Kiell Smith-Bynoe's Channel 4 Blap Red Flag.

He appeared as Earring Magic Ken — with a changed necklace — in the 2023 film Barbie, alongside the character Sugar Daddy Ken, another discontinued Ken doll.

== Filmography ==
=== Film ===
Year	Title	Role	Notes
2013	About Time	John	
2015	Captain Webb	J.B. Johnson	
2015	Thomas & Friends: Sodor's Legend of the Lost Treasure	Rex (voice)	
2016	Thomas & Friends: The Great Race	Rex (voice)	Uncredited
2018	The Spy Who Dumped Me	Edward Snowden	
2019	Tales from the Lodge	Zeke Holloway	
2019	Thomas and Friends: Digs and Discoveries	Alfie (voice)	UK/US versions
2019	Horrible Histories: The Movie – Rotten Romans	Percy	
2020	A Christmas Carol	Fred / Charity Worker	
2022	All My Friends Hate Me	Pete	
2023	Barbie	Earring Magic Ken	
2023	Poor Things	Steward	
2024	Arthur's Whisky	Robert	
2025	100 Nights of Hero	Merchant	
2026	Snapshot	Tamworth	

=== Television ===
Year	Title	Role(s)	Notes
1995	The Wind in the Willows	Edward	Television film
1996	The Willows in Winter	Edward	Television film
2011	Comedy Lab		Episode: "Totally Tom"
2011–2012	Comedy Blaps	Various characters	5 episodes
2012	Harry & Paul		4 episodes
2013	Comedy Feeds	Scott	2 episodes
2014	Lovesick	Ivan	Episode: "Cressida"
2014	Space Ark	Mike	Television film
2014–2016	Siblings	Dan	12 episodes
2014–2019	Thomas & Friends	Duncan, Rex, Terence, Alfie, The Fat Clergyman, Teddy Boston, Various (voices)	UK/US versions Succeeding Nathan Clarke as the voice of Alfie
2015	Up the Women	Bertie Smuth	Episode: "The Romance"
2015	Count Arthur Strong	Eddie	Episode: "Fame at Last"
2015	Doctor Who	Lofty	Episode: "The Girl Who Died"
2015	Crackanory	Parent / Todd Sydney	Episode: "The Catchment Area & the Frogbeast of Pontfidd"
2015–2016	Murder in Successville	Vladimir Putin / Neil	2 episodes
2015–2016	Drunk History	Various	5 episodes
2015–present	Horrible Histories	Various	35 episodes
2016	Mid Morning Matters with Alan Partridge	Clement Rowe	Episode: "Massage + Royal Visit"
2016	Hail Mary	Inspector Matteo	Television film
2016	Revived	Lee B.	Television film
2017	What Would Diplo Do?	Calvin Harris	Episode: "The Beef"
2017	Loaded	Greg	2 episodes
2017	Decline and Fall	Alistair Digby-Vaine-Trumpington	Miniseries, 2 episodes
2018–2019, 2021	Stath Lets Flats	Robbie	9 episodes
2018, 2020, 2023	The Windsors	Jack	3 episodes
2018, 2021	Pls Like	DumpGhost	7 episodes
2019	Sorry	Harry	Television film
2021	Trying	Toby	Episode: "Maddest Sweetest Thing"
2021	Buffering	Russell	Episode: "Throuple Goals"
2021	Spitting Image	Voice artist	6 episodes
2022	Mood	Josh	Episode: "Hannibal"
2022	Red Flag	Various	Miniseries
2023	A Small Light	Daniel van Dijk	Miniseries
2023	Dreaming Whilst Black	Jamie	Episode: "The Dream"
2024	Daddy Issues	Ben	2 episodes
2025	Prime Target	Ricky Olson	Episode: "Syracuse"
2026	Living the Dream		
