= The Willows in Winter =

1996 British animated television film by Dave Unwin

- US videotape cover
- Genre: Animation
- Based on: The Willows in Winter by William Horwood
- Screenplay by: Ted Walker
- Directed by: Dave Unwin
- Starring: Alan Bennett; Michael Palin; Michael Gambon; Rik Mayall
- Composer: Colin Towns
- Country of origin: United Kingdom
- Original language: English

Production
- Executive producer: Jonathan Peel
- Producer: John Coates
- Running time: 74 minutes
- Production companies: TVC London; Carlton UK Productions; HIT Entertainment; The Family Channel

Original release
- Network: The Family Channel
- Release: 16 December 1996

Related
- The Wind in the Willows (1995)

The Willows in Winter is a 1996 British animated television film directed by Dave Unwin and written by Ted Walker, and based on the 1993 novel The Willows in Winter by William Horwood. The film is a sequel to the 1995 film The Wind in the Willows, which is based on the 1908 novel The Wind in the Willows by Kenneth Grahame. The film was produced by the TVC (Television Cartoons) in London for Carlton UK Productions, in association with HIT Entertainment and The Family Channel. It premiered in the United States on The Family Channel on 16 December 1996, and was broadcast in the United Kingdom on ITV on 26 December 1996. It received positive reviews like the first film, and Rik Mayall and Loraine Marshall won Emmy Awards for Best Voice Acting and Art Direction respectively.

== Plot ==
Like its predecessor, the movie opens with a live-action sequence in which the narrator (Vanessa Redgrave) tells her grandchildren a story. Set an unspecified amount of time after the first tale, the animals have been joined by Mole's recently orphaned, unnamed nephew, whom Toad temporarily allows to stay with him at Toad Hall. However, he packs him off back to Mole End when he sees an aeroplane fly overhead and prioritises taking to the skies. Winter comes and one night, just as Mole finally agrees to tell his nephew about how he met Ratty and the others, Portly, the son of Mole's friend Otter, suddenly bursts in out of the blizzard outside and, having helped himself to a strong drink, falls asleep halfway through telling Mole something about Ratty and Otter. Worried that they may be in trouble, Mole leaves his nephew to look after Portly and ventures out into the night to get to Ratty's house. Having got to the frozen river and with no other way to get across, Mole attempts to walk across the ice, only to fall through a thin patch and be lost from view.

The next day, Ratty and Otter arrive at Mole End looking for Portly, it turns out they simply wished that Mole could join them for a drink the previous night and that Portly ran off to invite Mole without their approval. Horrified that Mole has not returned, Ratty and Otter recruit the aid of Badger to find their friend and Badger intimidates the denizens of the Wild Wood (who, apart from the Chief Weasel, now all live in fear and awe of the group following the Battle of Toad Hall) into helping with the search.

Meanwhile, Toad has bought an aeroplane, but is furious that only a qualified pilot may fly it for him. The pilot agrees to keep his head down while flying the plane, to give the impression that Toad is flying it. Ratty and Badger spot Toad flying over, and although disenchanted with Toad's aloofness, they realise his plane could come in handy to track Mole's whereabouts, and so they go to Toad Hall to requisition the plane with the pilot in command. Toad, giving into his recurring consuming control lusts, knocks out the pilot and commandeers the plane with Ratty in the leading seat on aerial lookout. Toad gets lost in his head and starts doing wild stunts with the plane, causing Ratty to fall out before Toad fleetingly realises he's gone. Ratty has a parachute, but on the way down his mind channels out in a near-death experience, becoming convinced subsequently that he has seen 'Beyond' and giving him a fresh glimmer of hope. Ratty, Badger, and the others are enraged with Toad's complete loss-of-mind and shout out angrily "You can go hang!"

Badger and Ratty eventually find a letter that Mole took with him and concealed in the trunk of a tree before attempting to cross the river - the letter contains his will. Badger is consequently left certain that Mole is dead and, despite Ratty's refusal to believe this, arranges a funeral for him. Mole however has drifted to a small island downriver. Ratty's rowboat, having drifted downstream after the river started to thaw, eventually reaches the island and Mole uses it to save himself. That night, Badger holds Mole's funeral and delivers a grand eulogy in honour of his friend, but Portly gets bored and wanders off. He sees Mole arrive in the rowboat and, mistaking Mole for a vengeful ghost, panics and runs back to the funeral, where everyone except Badger flees from the 'ghost'. Badger furiously orders the 'spirit' to leave so they can finish Mole's funeral, and Mole reveals himself, much to everyone's relief, although Badger still fixedly believes it was bare luck that Mole and Rat survived the tribulations.

Meanwhile, Toad has crash-landed into a large greenhouse in town and to his horror, the owner is none other than the judge who sentenced him to prison for motorcar theft. Toad poses as a pilot trying to prove himself and he is regarded as a hero. Recuperating in the judge's house, Toad is invited to dinner, but does not wish to blow his cover, so he blocks up the fireplace in his room and requests a chimney sweep. Getting the sweeper drunk, Toad switches clothes with him and attempts to escape, but his vanity gets the better of him and causes him to confess who he really is. The judge then attempts to arrest him, but Toad narrowly escapes.

The riverbankers arrange a party at Badger's house for the Wild Wooders (their promised reward for searching for Mole), so they go to Toad Hall to borrow some of Toad's furniture and cutlery. The house is flooded due to the bursting pipe in the attic during the thaw, so they take everything for safekeeping, Ratty also finds a letter with an American postmark for Toad. Toad, meanwhile, gets roped into attending a wedding to bring good luck, but the judge is the groom's father and Toad is finally caught for wrecking a wedding. The residents of the River Bank read about Toad's adventures in the paper and are shocked to discover that Toad is being denounced as a menace to society (the article implies that Toad murdered the sweep). Badger reads about Toad's arrest and, knowing things can only get worse if he doesn't do something, he quickly writes a letter to an old friend of his, the editor of The Times newspaper.

A miserable Toad appears in court on trial, where he is manipulated into forfeiting his right to have a lawyer and is denounced by everyone present, including the sweep's supposed widow. Toad tearfully pleads guilty to all the charges, also confessing to having abandoned the search for Mole and possibly killed Ratty, which confuses the court into an uproar as they knew nothing about Toad's friends causing Toad himself to have an angry outburst, saying he'll report them to The Devil. A letter from the editor of The Times is suddenly delivered, revealing that both he and Badger vouch for Toad's good character, and the judge's butler also testifies on Toad's behalf, revealing that the sweep is still alive and reminding everyone that Toad's actions saved several lives (even if he did it by mistake). Toad is acquitted of all charges and allowed to return to Toad Hall, learning before he goes that the butler knew who he was from the start.

Badger's party is a flop, with Badger not accustomed to handling large social gatherings and everyone missing Toad. Toad returns to his ancestral home, horrified to find everything ruined and missing. In a drunken state from too much wine, Toad assumes the worst to his riverbanker friends for all of his recklessness, and accidentally knocks over a candle which sets the house on fire. As everyone discovers what's happened, Toad melodramatically refuses rescue and resigns himself to a fiery death. Ratty and Mole, however, use the tunnel under Toad Hall to get in and heroically save Toad. Toad is broke and has no insurance to restore Toad Hall, leaving him miserable. The letter Ratty found solves everything - a rich American relative of Toad has died and left his vast fortune of $5,000,000 (£3,211,098 Or £392,075,383 in 2021) to Toad. Toad, and everyone celebrates as Toad Hall collapsed into ashes.

== Cast ==
=== Live-action ===
- Vanessa Redgrave as Grandmother/Narrator
- Jemima Ffyne as Alexandra
- Jordan Hollywood as Emma
- Tom Stourton as Edward

=== Voice cast ===
- Rik Mayall as Mr. Toad
- Alan Bennett as Mole
- Michael Palin as Rat
- Michael Gambon as Badger
- Enn Reitel as Otter
- Adrian Scarborough as Nephew Mole
- Zoot Lynam as Portly
- James Villiers as Magistrate
- David Sinclair as Gaoler / Clerk
- Mark Lockyer as Chief Weasel
- Ronnie Fraser as Chief Judge
- Peter Cellier as Prendergast
- Windsor Davies as Commissioner of Police
- Mike Grady as Pilot
- Simon Williams as Bishop
- Bill Oddie as Sweep
- Kate Robbins
- Meg Nicol
- Dan Russell
- Bob Saker

== Home media ==
In the United Kingdom, the film was released on VHS by Carlton Home Entertainment in 1996. In the United States, GoodTimes Home Video released the film on VHS in 1997.

In the United States, GoodTimes released a DVD in 2001, combining The Willows in Winter with The Wind in the Willows on a single disc. In the United Kingdom, Carlton and Reader's Digest reissued the film in 2005 on both VHS and DVD as The Complete Wind in the Willows: The Willows in Winter - Volume 2.
