= Mark Haysom =

British management executive (born 1953)

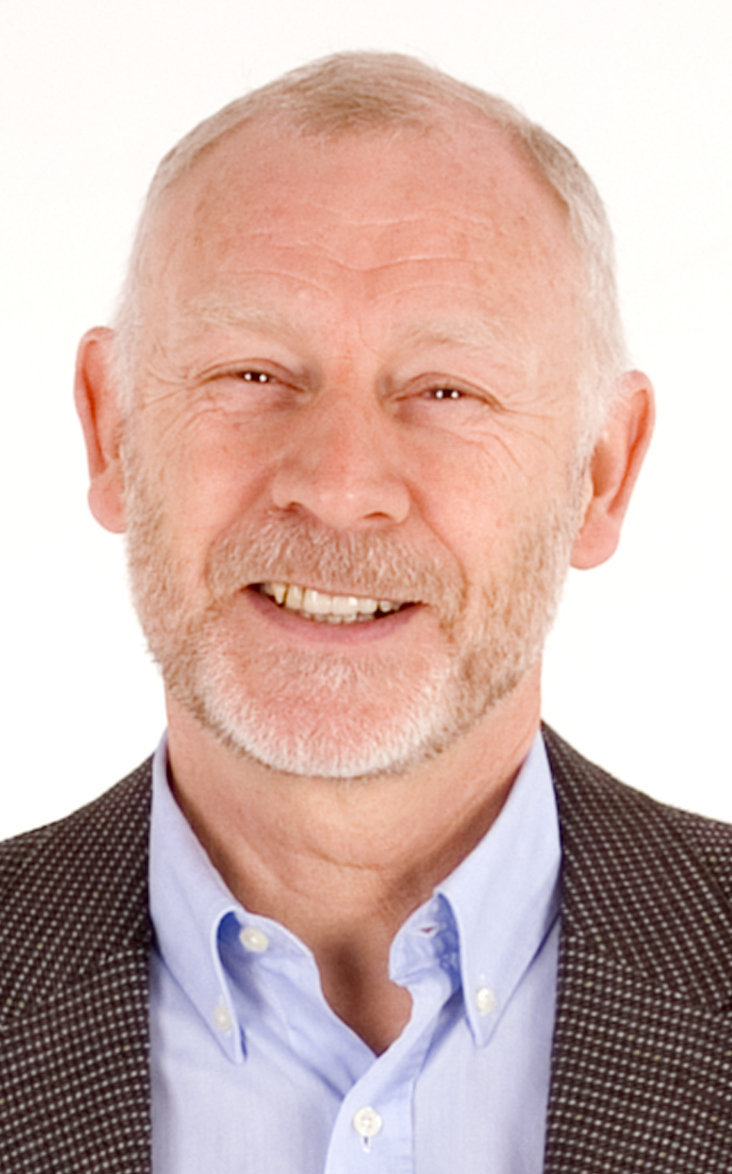
- Born: 17 September 1953 (age 72); Margate, Kent, England, UK
- Education: University of Leicester
- Occupation: management executive

Mark Haysom CBE (born 17 August 1953) is a British former management executive.

== Early life and education ==
Born in Margate, Kent, Haysom was educated at Hazelwood School, East Grinstead Grammar School (now Imberhorne School) and the University of Leicester where he read English.

== Management executive career ==
Haysom trained as a journalist and edited weekly newspapers in the north of England. He worked in a variety of management roles at Reed International, Thomson Regional Newspapers and Trinity Mirror.

In 2003 Haysom was appointed as Chief Executive of the Learning and Skills Council (LSC). In 2005 he was awarded an Honorary Doctorate from Leicester University for his contribution to business. In 2008 he was awarded a CBE for services to education and training. He resigned from the LSC in March 2009 following the suspension and crisis surrounding the LSC's "Building Colleges for the Future programme.

== Author ==
Haysom is an author of several short stories and novels including "Love, Love Me Do" (2014) and "Imagine" (2015).

== Sources ==
- Honorary Degree Oration
- CBE announcement
- Resignation statement
- Epolitix interview
- Times Higher article
- Who Cleans Up In Schools?
- HMRC Board profile
- Mark Haysom's appearance before IUS Select Committee
- They took a bullet for the boss
- Berlinale
- Irish Independent
