= Ted Walker =

English writer

- Born: 28 November 1934; Lancing, England
- Died: 19 March 2004 (aged 69); Valencia, Spain
- Occupations: Poet, short story writer, travel writer, screenwriter, broadcaster
- Spouse(s): Lorna Benfell (1956–1987); Audrey Hicks (1988–2004)
- Children: 4
- Writing career
- Period: 1963–2001
- Notable works: Screenplay: Big Jim and the Figaro Club (1979) Children's book: The Lion's Cavalcade (1981); Autobiography: The High Path (1982); Collected short stories: You've Never Heard Me Sing (1985) Travel book: In Spain (1987)

Edward Joseph (Ted) Walker FRSL (28 November 1934 – 19 March 2004) was a prize-winning English poet, short story writer, travel writer, TV and radio dramatist and broadcaster.

== Early life ==
Ted Walker was born in Lancing, West Sussex, the son of a carpenter from Birmingham with family roots in the village of Shrawley in rural Worcestershire who had found work in the south-coast construction industry. Walker was educated at Steyning Grammar School and St John's College, Cambridge, where he read modern languages. His earlier poems and later autobiographical work, in particular The High Path, show that his childhood appeared to have been unusually happy and totally remembered. However, there was tragedy too: both of his paternal uncles, who lived in shared accommodation together with Walker's parents, grandparents and aunt, were killed in World War II; George in North Africa and Jack on Shoreham Beach.

At the age of 15 he met Lorna Benfell, and almost immediately after they finished college they were married (in 1956, at St Mary de Haura Church, Shoreham-by-Sea). At first they lived in west London and worked as teachers, she in Tottenham and he in Paddington and Southall. They had four children.

It was at school that Walker and John Cotton, a like-minded colleague, founded a poetry magazine, Priapus, an attractive if amateur production, copies of which are now very rare. Walker published some work in the early numbers, the beginning of his poetic career.

== Poetry and short stories ==
In 1963 Walker obtained a teaching post in Bognor Regis and from there moved to Chichester High School. He had also started to write poetry regularly and of a quality that made it welcome in journals such as The Listener, The Observer, the Times Literary Supplement and the London Magazine. It drew the attention of William Plomer, then poetry editor at Jonathan Cape and a powerful figure in the poetry world. Walker had also submitted poems to The New Yorker, where Howard Moss made his work welcome. The fee which Walker received for his first poem to be published in The New Yorker, "Breakwaters" (published June 1963) helped him to move back to his native Sussex. Looking for a new source of income, Walker taught himself the art of short story writing, and his first short story, "Estuary", appeared in The New Yorker in April 1964.

Other key influences on his literary development included the Welsh poet Leslie Norris and canon of Chichester Cathedral, the Scotsman Andrew Young, both near neighbours, as well as the Welsh filmmaker and poet John Ormond and the critic Robert Gittings.

Walker's first book of verse, Fox on a Barn Door, focused on the Sussex countryside and coast. The titles of a good third of the poems – such as "Breakwaters", "The Skate Fishers" and "On the Sea Wall" are about the shoreline of Lancing and Shoreham. The South Downs likewise provided inspiration.

== Journalism and broadcasting ==
In the 1970s Walker was a contributor to his local newspaper, The Chichester Observer, where his regular column on West Sussex villages fascinated (and often enraged) the county set. He also began broadcasting with BBC local radio and TV. In 1979 he worked on a TV dramatisation with BBC Bristol producer Colin Rose. It was the start of a productive relationship. Their output included Big Jim and the Figaro Club (1981) and A Family Man (1983). Big Jim, a series of comedy films set during the postwar building boom, extolled the comradeship which, for Walker, epitomised working-class life "in them far-off days of the Figaro Club before the world turned lax and sour". A Family Man dealt with several generations of father-son relationships, drawing deeply on Walker's own family history.

Walker also wrote plays for Shaun McLaughlin in BBC radio drama and adapted Kenneth Grahame's The Wind in the Willows (1995) for TVC (Television Cartoons)' animated production with a voice cast including Alan Bennett, Rik Mayall, Michael Palin and Michael Gambon.

== Later life ==
For most of his working life (1971–92) Walker earned a living as Professor of Creative Writing at New England College, an American liberal arts academy that had a British campus in West Sussex, while pursuing his writing and other great passion, travel. He was a frequent visitor to Spain, and in 1989 he published an account of his experiences and impressions of the country, In Spain. Although this was Walker's only significant venture into travel writing, it was greeted by critics as one of the finest portraits of the country. For example, Jan Morris listed it as one of her favourite books on Spain, describing it as "rich in details and sensations". After a long hiatus Walker returned to poetry with Mangoes on the Moon (1999), with many poems inspired by his travels in Australia.

In 1987 Lorna Walker died after a long battle against cancer. A year later Walker married their close friend, Audrey Hicks, who had been similarly bereaved.

In The Last of England Walker tells the moving story of Lorna's disfiguring illness, and his own grief at being robbed of their anticipated years of retirement together. The cancer also serves as a metaphor for what Walker saw as the unrelenting decay of the England so lovingly described in The High Path.

In 1997 Ted and Audrey Walker moved to the village of Alcalali near Valencia, Spain, where he died in 2004.

== Honours ==
Walker's early poetry won many prizes, including the Eric Gregory Award (1964) and the Alice Hunt Bartlett Prize. He was the first winner of the Cholmondeley Award (1966). Walker was elected a Fellow of the Royal Society of Literature in 1975 (he resigned this title in 1997). Southampton University granted Walker an honorary D.Litt. in 1987.

== Literary work ==
=== Poetry ===
- Fox on a Barn Door (1965)
- The Solitaries' (1969) – winner of the Alice Hunt Bartlett Prize
- The Night Bathers (1970)
- Gloves to the Hangman (1973)
- Burning the Ivy (1978)
- Hands at a Live Fire (Selected Poems, 1987)
- Mangoes on the Moon (1999)

=== Short stories ===
- You've Never Heard Me Sing (1985)
- He Danced with a Chair (2001)

=== Autobiographies ===
- The High Path (1982) winner of the J. R. Ackerley Prize for Autobiography
- The Last of England (1993)

=== Children's books ===
- The Lion's Cavalcade (with Alan Aldridge, 1981)
- Granddad's Seagulls (1994)

=== Travel ===
- In Spain (1987)

== Television and radio ==
- The Gaffer
- The Family Man
- Big Jim & the Figaro Club
- The Wind in the Willows
- The Willows in Winter
