= Snapshot (2026 film) =

British horror film

- Directed by: Joseph Archer
- Screenplay by: Cathy Wippell
- Produced by: Joseph Archer; Cathy Wippell; Chippy Babu; Mario Stefan; Serge Cedrick
- Starring: Tom Stourton; Cathy Wippell
- Cinematography: Joseph Archer
- Edited by: Joseph Archer
- Production company: Silicon Gothic
- Distributed by: Dark Star Pictures
- Release date: August 15, 2026 (Edinburgh)
- Running time: 86 minutes
- Country: United Kingdom
- Language: English

Snapshot is a 2026 British horror film directed by Joseph Archer written-by and co-starring Cathy Wippell, and starring Tom Stourton.

The film had its world premiere at the 2026 Edinburgh International Film Festival.

== Premise ==
In Victorian England, an inventor of an early camera follows a group of women who believe the killer in their midst is an actually a ghost.

== Cast ==
- Tom Stourton as Tamworth
- Freya Parks as Clara
- Cathy Wippell as Minnie
- Hazel Rogers as Fanny
- Lydia Helen as Molly
- Nadia Lamin as Evelyn
- Rosie-Bella Johnson as Constance
- Ishtar Currie-Wilson as Alice

== Production ==
The film marks the feature-length directorial debut of Joseph Archer and written by Cathy Wippell. It was shot in a pinhole camera style with 1:1 aspect ratio. It was produced by Archer and Wippell's company Silicon Gothic. Archer was also cinematography and editor on the film. His previous horror short film included Mean Spirited (2021) and The Cornucopia Club (2024).

The cast is led by Tom Stourton with Cathy Wippell, Hazel Rogers, Lydia Helen, Nadia Lamin, Rosie-Bella Johnson, Ishtar Currie-Wilson and Freya Parks.

== Release ==
The film had its world premiere at the 2026 Edinburgh International Film Festival. It will be released in North American theatres in 2027 by distributor Dark Star Pictures.

== Reception ==
Peter Bradshaw in The Guardian described the film as a "cheerfully ingenious lo-fi movie experiment".

Guy Lodge in Variety, said that "Found footage may be a fairly stale gimmick in horror these days, but… Snapshot finds a way to freshen up the idea".
