= Imberhorne School =

- Imberhorne School Crest

Location
- Imberhorne Lane; East Grinstead, West Sussex, RH19 1QY; England; 51.1339°N 0.0345°W

Information
- Type: Community school
- Motto: Compassion Achievement Respect Endeavour
- Established: 1970
- Founder: Robert Payne
- Local authority: West Sussex
- Department for Education URN: 126088 Tables
- Ofsted: Reports
- Chair of Governors: Andy Yule
- Head teacher: Matthew Whatford
- Gender: Coeducational
- Age: 11 to 18
- Enrolment: 1690
- Colour: Games: Red Navy Blue School: Royal Blue
- Publication: CONTACT
- Website: http://www.imberhorne.w-sussex.sch.uk/

Imberhorne School is a maintained coeducation comprehensive school in East Grinstead, West Sussex, England, which admits pupils between the ages of 11 and 18. The school has a roll of 1,650, including 300 in the Sixth Form, and is on two sites, Windmill Lane and Imberhorne Lane.

== Facilities ==
Imberhorne is split into two sites. The Windmill Lane site, which is the old county grammar school, houses years 7, 8 and 9 (key stage 3) and the Imberhorne Lane site is used by years 10, 11 (key stage 4) and the Sixth form. These are commonly referred to as ‘Lower’ and ‘Upper’ school respectively, by both the students and staff. The upper site also contains the DiGasson Sports Facility, consisting of a drama/dance studio, sports centre, changing rooms, sports classrooms and the medical centre, it is commonly used both internally by the school and by external groups.

== History ==
Pupils have achieved higher than average results and the school has ranked within the top 10 in West Sussex. In 2008 GCSE results, 69% students achieved five or more A*–C passes, compared to a national average of 63%. The Sixth Form provides both academic, BTEC, and vocational courses.

In 2010, Imberhorne achieved an 'outstanding' Ofsted rating after a full inspection.

In 2015, the Imberhorne School under-15s rugby team reached the 6th round of the NatWest Schools Cup Vase competition. The team achieved the school's highest-place finish in its history. The Daily Telegraph article said that "It's a feel-good tale, as Imberhorne have defeated some much more prestigious schools along the way".

In 2018, Imberhorne was ranked against every state funded school in the country in the Best Schools Guide. The guide awarded schools a one-to-five rating across attainment, progress, attendance and outcomes. Imberhorne scored four out of five in every category, ranking it as East Grinstead's top school. It was ranked 9th overall in West Sussex, and 773rd in the country. Imberhorne achieved a higher rank than Sackville School, the other secondary school in the town, who were ranked as the 29th best school in West Sussex and 1564 in the country.

The headteacher as of 2024 is Matthew Whatford. In 2004, the school was awarded Artsmark Silver and Sportsmark for excellence in these areas.

== Notable alumni ==
- David Earl, actor and comedian: Derek, Cemetery Junction, Extras
- Richard Fairbrass of Right Said Fred
- Fred Fairbrass of Right Said Fred
- Mark Haysom author
- Stuart Simmonds, cricketer
- Bruce Herbelin-Earle, actor
- Callie Kazumi, novelist
- Sam Tutty, Olivier Award-winning actor: Dear Evan Hansen
- Cleo Demetriou, Olivier Award-winning actress: Matilda the Musical
- Nick Van Eede of Cutting Crew

• Alexander Edwards, Cricketer

== Notable staff ==
- Paul Harvey, pianist, former Head of Music
