= Dujonna Gift =

English actress

- Born: Dujonna Rhea Gift-Simms; 16 July 1997 (age 29)
- Other name: Dujonna Gift
- Occupations: Actress, singer, photographer
- Years active: 2016–present
- Website: www.shotbydujonna.com

Dujonna Gift is a British actress, singer and photographer. She has worked in theatre and film. She appears as Maple in Disney's live-action adaptation of Snow White (2025).

== Early life and education ==
Gift was born to a Grenadian mother and a British father of Jamaican heritage and grew up in Streatham, South London. Gift took classes at Hammersmith and Fulham's Michelle Bourne Dance Academy from a young age. She attended the BRIT School for sixth form. She then began a degree at Bird College, but left after a year when she was cast in Motown.

== Career ==
=== Theatre ===
Gift has performed on London's West End. She was a member of the ensemble cast of Hamilton at the Victoria Palace Theatre. She performed in Motown: The Musical at the Shaftesbury Theatre, where she portrayed Motown artist Anna Gordy.

In 2023, Gift took on a lead role alongside Sam Tutty in the musical Two Strangers (Carry a Cake Across New York), performed at the Kiln Theatre.

=== Film ===
Gift made her film debut in 2025, as Maple in Disney's live-action adaptation of Snow White.

=== Photography ===
In addition to performing, Gift works as a headshot photographer and portrait photographer.

== Filmography ==
=== Film ===
Film
Year	Title	Role	Notes
2025	Snow White	Maple	Live-action adaptation of Disney's Snow White and the Seven Dwarfs

=== Theatre ===
Theatre
Year	Production	Role	Venue	Notes
2017	Motown: The Musical	Anna Gordy	Shaftesbury Theatre	
2018	Caroline, or Change	Radio 1	Playhouse Theatre	
2019-2021	Hamilton	Angelica Schuyler/Eliza Hamilton/Peggy Schuyler/Maria Reynolds/Ensemble	Victoria Palace Theatre	
2023-2024	Two Strangers (Carry a Cake Across New York)	Robin Delafosse	Kiln Theatre and Criterion Theatre	
2024	Little Piece Of You	Britt	Theatre Royal, Drury Lane	
2026	Once On This Island	Ti Moune	Theatre Royal, Drury Lane	
