= Two Strangers (Carry a Cake Across New York) =

Stage musical

- (Carry a Cake Across New York)
- Off-West End Promotional Poster
- Music: Jim Barne
- Lyrics: Kit Buchan
- Book: Kit Buchan
- Premiere: 5 November 2019: New Wolsey Theatre, Ipswich
- Productions: 2019 Ipswich and Northampton; 2023 London; 2024 West End; 2025 Cambridge; 2025 Broadway

Two Strangers (Carry a Cake Across New York) is a British musical by Jim Barne and Kit Buchan. The musical was first produced in 2019 in Ipswich and Northampton under the name The Season, starring Tori Allen-Martin and Alex Cardall. A new production opened at Kiln Theatre in 2023, starring Dujonna Gift and Sam Tutty. In April 2024, it transferred to the Criterion Theatre in the West End. It is now playing at the Longacre Theatre on Broadway (premiering in November 2025), with Tutty back in the show, opposite Christiani Pitts from the Cambridge production. It was The New York Times' "Critic's Pick".

Under its previous title, The Season, the show received a Stage Debut Award for Best Composer, Lyricist or Book Writer, and before that also the Stiles & Drewe Mentorship prize.

== Plot ==
=== Act 1 ===
25-year-old Englishman Dougal Todd flies to Christmastime New York for the wedding of his millionaire father, Mark, to 30-year-old Melissa. The sister of the bride, cynical 27-year-old New York native Robin Delafosse (Rainey in the Broadway production), picks Dougal up from JFK Airport. Irritated by his enthusiasm for the city he sees in films, Robin puts her headphones on as Dougal serenades plans to tour his wildly inaccurate list of landmarks ("New York"). At his hotel, Dougal calls his single mother and reads his wedding invitation, thrilled to meet his father for the first time in his life ("Dad").

In the coffee shop where she works, Robin reflects on her sideline life's monotony and wonders what she is missing ("What'll It Be"). Melissa tasks her with collecting the expensive wedding cake from Flatbush, Brooklyn, and Dougal joins along. The two bond over Robin's Tinder frustrations with "absolutely horrifying men" and "Perfect Justin" ("On the App"), her memories of childhood in Flatbush ("This Is the Place"), and the barely concealed sexual themes of Christmas songs ("Under the Mistletoe"). At Melissa's doorstep, Robin accidentally drops and destroys one of the cake's four boxes. Dougal reassures her; when he asks her about happiness, Robin rejects the proverb to "Be Happy", with the numbness her years spent pursuing it left ("Be Happy"). Robin misses her grandma.

Dougal suggests a movie-style spree through Manhattan to cheer up. Robin lists out the city's high costs of living, asks him to leave, and calls Melissa. The sisters are distant. Dougal eats the dropped box of cake, returns, and helps Robin respond to on-the-spot messages from Perfect Justin, securing her a date. She instead spends the night spreeing with Dougal, using Mark's American Express card to enjoy the luxuries of Midtown Manhattan ("American Express").

=== Act 2 ===
Robin wakes up confused, embarrassed, and stressed, and Dougal "another day in Dreamtown"—together in a Plaza Hotel bridal suite ("The Hangover Duet"). Robin tries to persuade Dougal that meeting his father can never live up to his expectations, pleading him to leave his idealised image of Mark untouched ("He Doesn't Exist"). She finally tells Dougal that Melissa—not Mark—sent his invitation to get back at Mark for cheating, and that Mark had always kept Dougal a secret. A letter from Mark reveals he has persuaded Melissa to let Robin attend the wedding and expresses astonishment at Robin's purchases with her "friend", whom he obliviously invites. Robin again urges Dougal not to attend the wedding and perhaps start his tour of NYC, with her. Having travelled specifically to meet his father, Dougal reacts with angered denial and accuses Robin of being jealous. They argue ("What Did You Say?") until Dougal realises that Mark cheated on Melissa with Robin.

Dougal storms off. Outside the wedding at Trinity Church, he leaves a voicemail for his mother, reflecting on the events, his happiness, and his family's happiness ("About to Go In"). Robin laments the opportunities she has deliberately let slip away and the ways she has pushed people away. She resolves to change ("This Year").

Later, Robin eats alone at a Chinese restaurant, where Dougal joins her with a tier of cake he stole from the wedding they both refused to attend. Instead, they roleplay a movie-style wedding on their own terms ("Dearly Beloved"). As Dougal leaves for the airport, the two stroll through the city to end the day, glad that they met ("If I Believed"). Robin gifts Dougal a snow globe and resolves to visit her grandmother. Before they part ways, they read each other's fortune cookies: Dougal's reads, "You will go on a cruise", while Robin's reads, "This time next year you will be happy."

== Production history ==
=== Ipswich and Northampton (2019) ===
Originally called The Season, Two Strangers was co-produced by the New Wolsey Theatre and Royal & Derngate, directed by Tim Jackson, and starred Tori Allen-Martin as Robyn and Alex Cardall as Dougal. It ran in Ipswich from 5 to 16 November and in Northampton from 1 to 2 November and 19 to 30 November 2019.

=== Kiln Theatre, Off-West End (2023–24) ===
A new production under the new title Two Strangers (Carry a Cake Across New York) opened at London's Kiln Theatre, directed by Tim Jackson and starring Dujonna Gift as Robin and Sam Tutty as Dougal with designs by Soutra Gilmour. The production began previews from 9 November with a press night on 16 November and was originally due to run until 23 December before being extended to 20 January 2024.

=== West End (2024) ===
The Kiln production transferred to the West End for a strictly limited run with Gift and Tutty reprising their roles. The show began previews on 4 April at the Criterion Theatre, with a press night performed on 23 April. It was originally scheduled to run until 14 July 2024 but due to popular demand, the show extended its run until 31 August 2024.

=== Cambridge (A.R.T.) (2025) ===
The North American premiere at the American Repertory Theater began previews on 20 May 2025, opening on 30 May. Tutty reprised his role with Christiani Pitts joining as Robin. Originally slated to close 29 June 2025, due to popular demand the run was extended to 13 July 2025.

=== Broadway (2025–2026) ===
The show transferred to Broadway in November 2025 at the Longacre Theatre. Tutty and Pitts reprised their roles, and previews began 1 November with the official opening night at 20 November. The production was nominated for 8 Tony Awards, including Best Musical.

The Broadway production is scheduled to close on November 29, 2026, after 21 previews and 428 regular performances.

=== Off-Broadway (2027) ===
On Sunday, November 22, 2026, the show announced an Off-Broadway transfer at New World Stages with previews beginning on 22 March 2027 and officially opening on 4 April 2027.

=== North American Tour (2027) ===
On Thursday, May 21, 2026, the show's producers announced that a North American tour would begin in the fall of 2027. The tour will premiere at Providence Performing Arts Center in Providence, Rhode Island, before continuing onto cities across the U.S. and Canada.

== Cast and characters ==
Character	Ipswich	Northampton	Off-West End	West End	Cambridge	Broadway
Character	2019		2023	2024	2025	
Robin Delafosse/Rainey	Tori Allen-Martin	Tori Allen-Martin	Dujonna Gift	Dujonna Gift	Christiani Pitts	Christiani Pitts
Dougal Todd	Alex Cardall	Alex Cardall	Sam Tutty	Sam Tutty	Sam Tutty	Sam Tutty

== Cast recording ==
In February 2024, an eight-track EP was released on all major streaming platforms. In July 2024, an album was released on all major streaming platforms, which comprised 15 songs with a runtime of 47 minutes. The Robin and Dougal parts were sung by Gift and Tutty in both releases.

On March 20, 2026, an original Broadway Cast recording, sung by Pitts and Tutty, was released on major streaming platforms. The Broadway cast recording features 15 tracks, with a runtime of approximately 44 minutes.

== Musical numbers ==
Act 1

- "New York" – Dougal
- "Dad" – Dougal
- "What'll It Be" – Robin
- "On the App" – Robin & Dougal
- "This Is The Place" – Robin & Dougal
- "This is the Place (reprise)" – Dougal
- "Under The Mistletoe" – Robin & Dougal
- "Be Happy" – Robin
- "American Express" – Robin & Dougal

Act 2

- "The Hangover Duet" – Robin & Dougal
- "He Doesn't Exist" – Robin
- "What Did You Say?" – Robin & Dougal
- "New York/What'll It Be" – Robin & Dougal
- "About To Go In" – Dougal
- "This Year" – Robin
- "Dearly Beloved" – Robin & Dougal
- "If I Believed" – Robin & Dougal
- "New York/What'll It Be – Reprise" – Robin & Dougal

On the cast recordings, "What'll It Be" and "Dad"'s positions are swapped. "What Did You Say?" is only included on the West End cast recording, while the final song is only included on the Broadway cast recording.

== Reception ==
In November 2023, David Jays, writing for The Guardian, gave the play four out of five stars, noting that it "matches its wide-eyed hero and sardonic heroine with just the right mix of sugar and sour". In The Observer, the writer Kate Kellaway gave the show five stars, calling it "fresh, funny, ironic, inventive and moving" and describing the production as "flawless." Also in November 2023, The Telegraph's Marianka Swain wrote, "Jim Barne and Kit Buchan's heartfelt musical two-hander has all the ingredients to be an irresistibly sweet treat for the festive season". Clive Davis of The Times wrote: "What a tantalising near miss. This journey is bumpier, played out on the designer Soutra Gilmour's revolving pile of suitcases. Like the Hollywood references, the set is something of a distraction, and the four-piece band perched above the actors lack firepower. The songs are fine; the script doesn't quite do them justice."

In January 2024, the musical was featured on The National Lottery's Big Night of Musicals, broadcast on BBC One. In April 2024, Alex Wood writing for WhatsOnStage gave the musical five stars and declared that it was "as good a night out in the West End as you can get". Stefan Kyriazis, of the Daily Express, wrote "I fell in love with Two Strangers (Carry A Cake Across New York) and you will too. It's a heartfelt and hilarious joy". Although Time Out provided a detailed synopsis of the show, giving it four stars out of five, it did state that "the first half is about 15 minutes too long, and [it thought] Dougal could be a grating character in the hands of a less winning actor than Tutty."

== Awards and nominations ==
=== Broadway production ===
Year	Award	Category	Work	Result	Ref.
2026	Drama League Awards	Outstanding Production of a Musical		Nominated	
2026	Drama League Awards	Distinguished Performance	Christiani Pitts	Nominated	
2026	Outer Critics Circle Award	Outstanding New Broadway Musical		Nominated	
2026	Outer Critics Circle Award	Outstanding Book of a Musical	Jim Barne and Kit Buchan	Nominated	
2026	Outer Critics Circle Award	Outstanding New Score	Jim Barne and Kit Buchan	Nominated	
2026	Outer Critics Circle Award	Outstanding Lead Performer in a Broadway Musical	Sam Tutty	Nominated	
2026	Drama Desk Award	Outstanding Musical		Nominated	
2026	Drama Desk Award	Outstanding Lead Performance in a Musical	Sam Tutty	Nominated	
2026	Drama Desk Award	Outstanding Lyrics	Jim Barne and Kit Buchan	Won	
2026	Tony Awards	Best Musical		Nominated	
2026	Tony Awards	Best Performance by an Actor in a Leading Role in a Musical	Sam Tutty	Nominated	
2026	Tony Awards	Best Performance by an Actress in a Leading Role in a Musical	Christiani Pitts	Nominated	
2026	Tony Awards	Best Direction of a Musical	Tim Jackson	Nominated	
2026	Tony Awards	Best Book of a Musical	Jim Barne and Kit Buchan	Nominated	
2026	Tony Awards	Best Original Score (Music and/or Lyrics) Written for the Theatre	Jim Barne and Kit Buchan	Nominated	
2026	Tony Awards	Best Scenic Design of a Musical	Soutra Gilmour	Nominated	
2026	Tony Awards	Best Orchestrations	Lux Pyramid	Nominated	
2026	Dorian Award	Outstanding Broadway Musical		Nominated	
2026	Dorian Award	Outstanding Lead Performance in a Broadway Musical	Sam Tutty	Nominated	
2026	Dorian Award	Outstanding Original Score of a Broadway Production	Jim Barne and Kit Buchan	Nominated	
2026	Dorian Award	Outstanding Book of a Broadway Musical	Jim Barne and Kit Buchan	Nominated	
