= Byron Pitts =

American television journalist (born 1960)

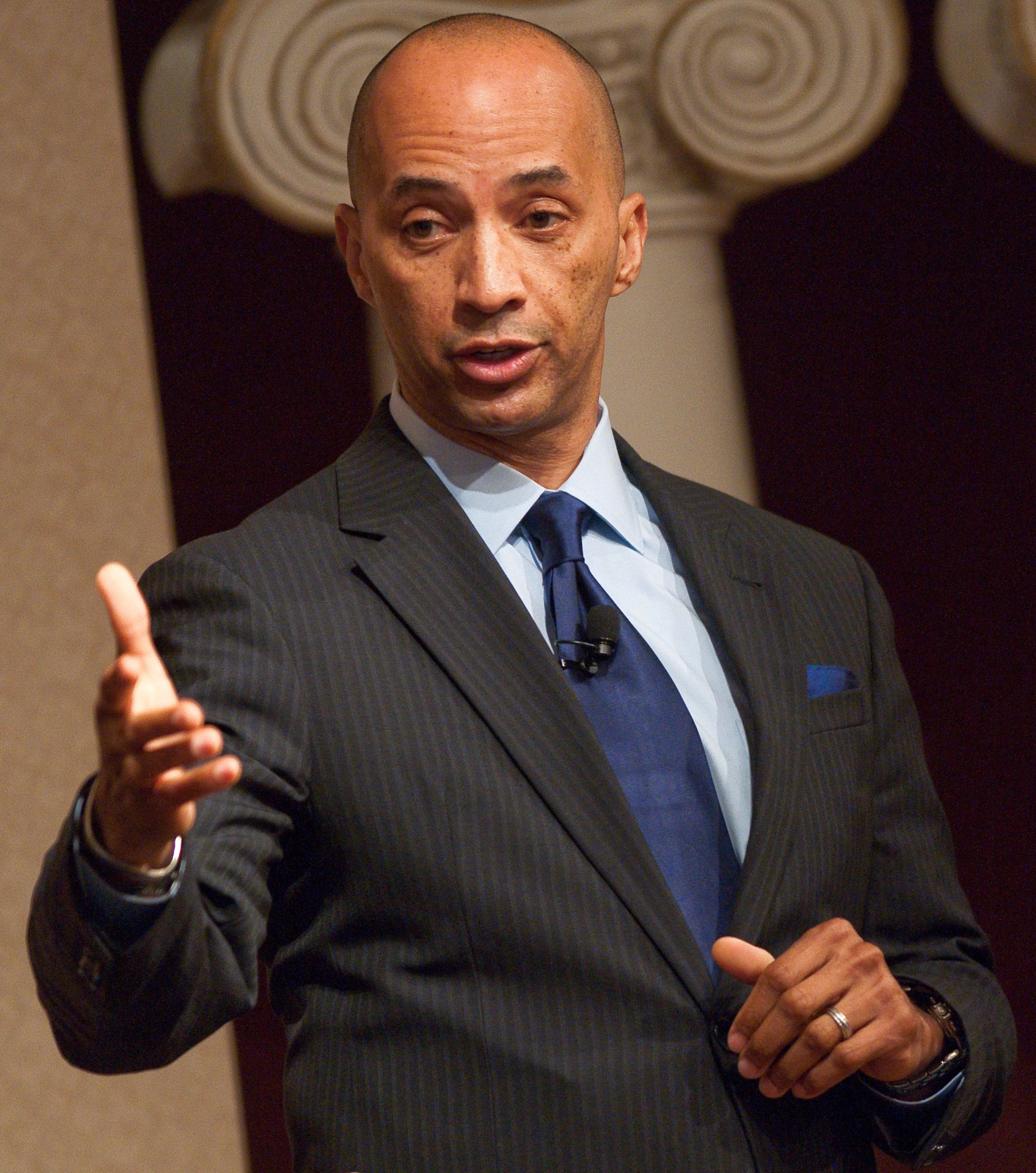
- Pitts in 2011
- Born: October 21, 1960 (age 65); Baltimore, Maryland, U.S.
- Education: Ohio Wesleyan University
- Occupation: Television journalist
- Years active: 1983–present
- Notable credit(s): CBS Evening News; 60 Minutes; Nightline
- Children: 3

Byron Pitts (born October 21, 1960) is an American journalist and author, working for ABC News as co-anchor for the network's late night news program, Nightline. Until March 2013, he served as a chief national correspondent for The CBS Evening News and contributed regularly to 60 Minutes.

== Early life ==
Pitts was born October 21, 1960, to Clarice and William Pitts in Baltimore, Maryland. He grew up in a working-class neighborhood, raised by a single mother. In his memoir, Pitts discussed that he had a debilitating stutter as a child and was "functionally illiterate" until about age 12. He attended Archbishop Curley High School, an all-boys Catholic high school in Baltimore. He went on to Ohio Wesleyan University, but spent summers in Apex, North Carolina. He graduated in 1982 with a bachelor's degree in journalism and speech communication.

== Career ==
Pitts has always wanted to be a journalist. It was his goal, since he was 18 years old, to be a correspondent on the CBS show 60 Minutes. He interned at WTVD in Durham, North Carolina. After graduation, he bounced around to various television stations on the East Coast. During 1983–84, he reported and served as weekend sports anchor at WNCT-TV in Greenville, North Carolina He was a military reporter for WAVY-TV in Portsmouth, Virginia (1984–86) and a reporter for WESH-TV Orlando (1986–88). He moved across the Florida peninsula to Tampa to be a reporter and substitute anchor for WFLA-TV (1988–89). After a brief stint there, he moved to Boston as a special assignment reporter for WCVB-TV (1989–94). His last local job was as a general assignment reporter for WSB-TV in Atlanta, Georgia (1994–96).

Pitts then moved to Washington, D.C. as a correspondent for CBS Newspath, the 24-hour affiliate news service of CBS News (1997–98). He was named a CBS News correspondent in May 1998, and was based in the Miami (1998–99) and Atlanta (1999–2001) bureaus and eventually New York City in January 2001.

Pitts was one of CBS News' lead reporters during the September 11 attacks and won a national Emmy Award for his coverage. As an embedded reporter covering the Iraq War, he was recognized for his work under fire within minutes of the fall of the Saddam Hussein statue. Other major stories covered by Pitts include Hurricane Katrina, the war in Afghanistan, the military buildup in Kuwait, the Florida fires, the Elian Gonzalez story, the Florida Presidential recount, the mudslides in Central America and the refugee crisis in Kosovo.

Pitts other awards include a national Emmy Award for his coverage of the Chicago train wreck in 1999 and a National Association of Black Journalists Award (2002). He is also the recipient of four Associated Press Awards and six regional Emmy Awards.

Pitts published a memoir, Step Out on Nothing: How Faith and Family Helped Me Conquer Life's Challenges on September 29, 2009.

In 2018, High Point University named Byron Pitts as Journalist in Residence.

== Personal life ==
Pitts has a daughter, Christiani Pitts, who is a TV and theater actress. He is a devout Christian and suffers from Cluster headaches.

== See also ==
- New Yorkers in journalism

== Websites ==
- Byron Pitts Biography on ABCNews.com
- Byron Pitts at IMDb
