= Soutra Gilmour =

British set designer

Soutra Gilmour is a British set designer. She is primarily known for her work on the London stage. She won the Evening Standard Award for Best Set Design in 2012 for her work on the Donmar Warehouse production of Inadmissible Evidence and the National Theatre production of Antigone. She is also a past nominee for three Olivier Awards and three Tony Awards.

== Career ==
She was born in London and trained at the Wimbledon School of Art. Gilmour has been one of the most in demand theatre creatives across the UK of the 2000s having designed over 60 drama and opera productions, largely in London theatres. Gilmour designed Running With Lions by Sian Carter at the Lyric Theatre, Hammersmith in 2022, and the original West End production of Burlesque.

Most recently Gilmour has been praised for her work on London's St. James Theatre revival of Urinetown: The Musical, the West End and Broadway revival of Sunset Boulevard and the West End and Broadway production of Two Strangers (Carry a Cake Across New York), the latter which garnered her a third Tony Award nomination.

== Stage credits ==
Year	Title	Role	Venue	Ref.
2005	Hair	Scenic Designer	London Fringe Festival	
2008	The Lover & The Collection	Scenic Designer	West End, Harold Pinter Theatre	
2011	Inadmissible Evidence	Scenic Designer, Costume Designer	West End, Donmar Warehouse	
2011	Reasons to be Pretty	Scenic Designer, Costume Designer	West End, Almeida Theatre	
2012	The Duchess of Malfi	Scenic Designer	West End, Old Vic Theatre	
2012	Antigone	Scenic Designer	West End, Royal National Theatre	
2012	Cyrano de Bergerac	Scenic Designer, Costume Designer	Broadway, American Airlines Theatre	
2012	Merrily We Roll Along	Designer	West End, Menier Chocolate Factory	
2013	The Hothouse	Designer	West End, Trafalgar Studios	
2013	The Pride	Designer	West End, Trafalgar Studios	
2013	The Night Alive	Scenic Designer, Costume Designer	Off-Broadway, Atlantic Theatre Company	
2014	Urinetown	Production Designer	West End, Apollo Theatre	
2015	The Homecoming	Designer	West End, Trafalgar Studios	
2017	Twelfth Night	Designer	West End, Royal National Theatre	
2017	The Wild Party	Scenic Designer, Costume Designer	West End, The Other Palace	
2017	My Brilliant Friend	Scenic Designer, Costume Designer	West End, The Rose Theatre	
2017	Guards at the Taj	Designr	West End, Bush Theatre	
2018	Strictly Ballroom	Scenic Designer	West End, Piccadilly Theatre	
2018	The Turn of the Screw	Scenic Designer, Costume Designer	West End, Open Air Theatre	
2018	Pinter at the Pinter	Season Designer	West End, Harold Pinter Theatre	
2019	Evita	Designer	West End, Open Fist Theatre	
2019	Betrayal	Scenic Designer, Costume Designer	Broadway, Bernard B. Jacobs Theatre	
2019	Cyrano de Bergerac	Designer	West End, Playhouse Theatre	
2020	Timon of Athens	Scenic Designer, Costume Designer	Off-Broadway, Theatre for a New Audience	
2020	A Doll's House	Designer	West End, Playhouse Theatre	
2021	& Juliet	Scenic Designer	West End, Shaftesbury Theatre	
2022	Running with Lions	Scenic Designer, Costume Designer	West End, Lyric Hammersmith	
2022	Cyrano de Bergerac	Designer	Off-Broadway, Brooklyn Academy of Music	
2022	Closer	Scenic Designer, Costume Designer	West End, Lyric Hammersmith	
2022	& Juliet	Scenic Designer	Broadway, Stephen Sondheim Theatre	
2022	Merrily We Roll Along	Scenic Designer, Costume Designer	Off-Broadway, New York Theatre Workshop	
2023	A Doll's House	Scenic Designer, Costume Designer	Broadway, Hudson Theatre	
2023	Further than the Furthest Thing	Designer	West End, Young Vic Theatre	
2023	Sunset Blvd.	Scenic Designer, Costume Designer	West End, Savoy Theatre	
2023	Merrily We Roll Along	Scenic Designer, Costume Designer	Broadway, Hudson Theatre	
2024	Just for One Day	Scenic Designer	West End, Old Vic Theatre	
2024	The Effect	Scenic Designer, Costume Designer	Off-Broadway, The Shed	
2024	Two Strangers (Carry a Cake Across New York)	Designer	West End, Criterion Theatre	
2024	& Juliet	Scenic Designer	U.S. National Tour	
2024	Sunset Blvd.	Scenic Designer, Costume Designer	Broadway, St. James Theatre	
2024	Burlesque	Scenic Designer	Manchester Opera House	
2025	Much Ado About Nothing	Designer	West End, Theatre Royal Drury Lane	
2025	Waiting for Godot	Scenic Designer, Costume Designer	Broadway, Hudson Theatre	
2025	Two Strangers (Carry a Cake Across New York)	Scenic Designer, Costume Designer	Broadway, Longacre Theatre	
2025	Burlesque	Scenic Designer	West End, Savoy Theatre	
2025	Woman in Mind	Scenic Designer, Costume Designer	West End, Duke of York's Theatre	
2025	Evita	Scenic Designer, Costume Designer	West End, The Palladium	
2027	Evita	Scenic Designer, Costume Designer	Broadway, Winter Garden Theatre	
2027	Two Strangers (Carry a Cake Across New York)	Scenic Designer, Costume Designer	U.S. National Tour	

== Awards and nominations ==
Year	Award	Category	Work	Result	Ref.
2009	Laurence Olivier Award	Best Set Design	The Lover & The Collection	Nominated	
2013	Tony Award	Best Costume Design of a Play	Cyrano de Bergerac	Nominated	
2014	Laurence Olivier Award	Best Costume Design	Merrily We Roll Along	Nominated	
2020	Laurence Olivier Award	Best Set Design	& Juliet	Nominated	
2020	Tony Award	Best Scenic Design of a Play	Betrayal	Nominated	
2024	Laurence Olivier Award	Best Set Design	Sunset Blvd.	Nominated	
2026	Tony Award	Best Scenic Design of a Musical	Two Strangers (Carry a Cake Across New York)	Nominated	
2026	Drama Desk Award	Outstanding Scenic Design of a Play	Waiting for Godot	Nominated	
