= The Wind in the Willows (1995 film) =

1995 British animated television film by Dave Unwin

- US videotape cover
- Genre: Animation
- Based on: The Wind in the Willows by Kenneth Grahame
- Screenplay by: Ted Walker
- Directed by: Dave Unwin
- Starring: Alan Bennett; Michael Palin; Michael Gambon; Rik Mayall
- Composer: Colin Towns
- Country of origin: United Kingdom
- Original language: English

Production
- Executive producer: Jonathan Peel
- Producer: John Coates
- Running time: 73 minutes
- Production companies: TVC London; Carlton UK Productions; HIT Entertainment; The Family Channel

Original release
- Network: ITV
- Release: 25 December 1995

Related
- The Willows in Winter (1996)

The Wind in the Willows is a 1995 British animated television film directed by Dave Unwin and written by Ted Walker. It is based on the 1908 novel The Wind in the Willows by Kenneth Grahame. It was produced by the TVC (Television Cartoons) in London for Carlton UK Productions, in association with HIT Entertainment and The Family Channel. It was first broadcast in the United Kingdom on ITV on 25 December 1995. In the United States, it premiered at the Palm Springs International Film Festival on 6 January 1996 and was broadcast on The Family Channel on 8 September 1996.

At the 1996 Chicago International Children's Film Festival, the film earned Unwin the Blockbuster Entertainment Most Popular Film award and the Children's Jury Award for Animated Feature Film or Video.

The film includes live action bookending segments with Vanessa Redgrave as a grandmother narrating the story to her grandchildren: the action morphs into an animated setting as she opens the book.

== Plot ==
Whilst out on a riverboat, a woman begins telling her grandchildren the story of The Wind in the Willows.

Disenchanted with spring cleaning, Mole ventures out of his underground home and comes across a river. He meets Rat, and the two quickly become friends. They visit the wealthy Mr. Toad, who convinces them to join him on a road trip in a Romani wagon. After a speeding motor car causes the wagon to crash, Toad becomes obsessed with cars.

Mole stays with Rat into the winter. One night, he decides to find the home of Rat's friend Badger in the Wild Wood. Lost in the forest, Mole becomes terrified. Rat eventually finds him, and the two stumble across Badger's house. Rat and Mole tell Badger about Toad's obsession with cars. Upon leaving, Mole feels homesick, so he and Rat pay a visit to Mole's abandoned home.

Toad frequently destroys his cars in dangerous accidents. Rat, Mole and Badger try to convince him to give up motoring, but he refuses and runs off. After stealing and crashing a car, Toad is sentenced to twenty years in prison. Meanwhile, Rat and Mole search for Otter's lost son Portly, who they eventually find with Pan.

Aided by the gaoler's daughter, Toad escapes from prison disguised as a washerwoman. Pursued by the police, he hitches a ride on a steam locomotive. The next day, after stealing a horse, Toad encounters a car carrying the judge who sentenced him. When the judge's driver invites Toad for a ride, Toad takes the wheel and crashes the car into a pond, and is once more pursued by the police.

Soon after, Toad reunites with his friends. His house, Toad Hall, has been taken over by weasels in his absence. Toad, Rat, Mole and Badger sneak into Toad Hall through an underground passage and drive the weasels out, then celebrate their victory.

== Cast ==
=== Live-action ===
- Vanessa Redgrave as Grandmother/Narrator
- Jemima Ffyne as Alexandra
- Jordan Hollywood as Emma
- Tom Stourton as Edward
- Barry Forster as Boatman

=== Voice cast ===
- Rik Mayall as Mr. Toad
- Alan Bennett as Mole
- Michael Palin as Rat
- Michael Gambon as Badger
- James Villiers as Magistrate
- Emma Chambers as Gaoler's Daughter
- Judy Cornwell as Barge Woman
- Enn Reitel as Otter / Rabbit / Policeman / Gaoler
- David Sinclair as Clerk / Rabbit #2 / Sergeant
- Mark Lockyer as Car Owner / Rabbit #3 / Policeman #2 / Driver / Town Crier / Chief Weasel

== Home media ==
The film was released on VHS in 1996 by Carlton Home Entertainment in the United Kingdom and by GoodTimes Home Video in the United States.

In the United Kingdom, Carlton Visual Entertainment released the film on DVD on 1 November 1999. The PAL Region 2 release includes a making-of featurette, Poop Poop: The Making of The Wind in the Willows. In 2005, Carlton and Reader's Digest reissued the film in the United Kingdom on both VHS and DVD as The Complete Wind in the Willows: The Wind in the Willows - Volume 1. In the United States, GoodTimes issued a DVD in 2001, combining The Wind in the Willows with its sequel, The Willows in Winter, on a single disc.

== Sequel ==
The film was followed by The Willows in Winter in 1996, based on the 1993 novel of the same name by William Horwood.
