= Tori Allen-Martin =

British actress

- Born: Victoria Allen-Martin; New York City, New York, U.S.
- Occupations: Actress; Director; Producer
- Years active: 2006–present

Victoria Allen-Martin is a British actress, director and producer. She is known for the television series Pure (2019) and also took leading roles in Unforgotten (2018) and London Kills (2019). She is also known for portraying the role of Robin in The Season (2019), now known as Two Strangers Carry a Cake Across New York.

In 2009 she founded and headed Interval Productions as its Creative Director. Interval Productions has produced eight musicals, including Streets, nominated for the 2013 Offie for Best New Musical. Allen-Martin and co-writer Sarah Henley were also nominated for most promising new playwrights.

Allen-Martin was shortlisted under the writers category for BBC New Talent Hotlist 2017.

== Acting credits ==
=== Film ===
Year	Title	Role	Notes
2022	Twitching	Ella	Short film
2024	Where To?	Jo	Short film

=== Television ===
Year	Title	Role	Notes
2018	Unforgotten	Sandra Rayworth	Series 3; episodes 2–5
2019	Pure	Libby	Episodes 2, 3 & 6
2019–2023	London Kills	TDC/DC Billie Fitzgerald	Series 1–4; 20 episodes
2020–2025	Here We Go	Cherry Lee-Dixon	Main cast. Series 1–3; 18 episodes
2021	Back to Life	Lena	Series 2; episode 3
2022	The Other Half	Billie	Pilot episode
2022	The Flatshare	Ariella	Episodes 2 & 6: "On the Apps" and "The Beginning"
2022	Plebs: Soldiers of Rome	Barbronelda	Television film
2023	Significant Other	Jen	Episode 3
2023	Mrs Sidhu Investigates	Gemma	Episode 4: "On the Ropes"
2025	Celebrity Mastermind	Herself - Contestant	Series 23; episode 8
2026	Death Valley	Amanda Sahni	Series 2, episode 4

=== Theatre ===
Year	Title	Role	Notes
2013	Streets: A New Kind of Musical	Co-writer and producer	Cockpit Theatre, Marylebone, London
2017	Muted	Co-writer and producer	Bunker Theatre, Southwark, London
2019	The Season	Robin	Royal & Derngate, Northampton, and Wolsey Theatre, Ipswich
2025	Midnight Cowboy: A New Musical	Multiple Characters	Southwark Playhouse Elephant, London
