= Capathia Jenkins =

American singer

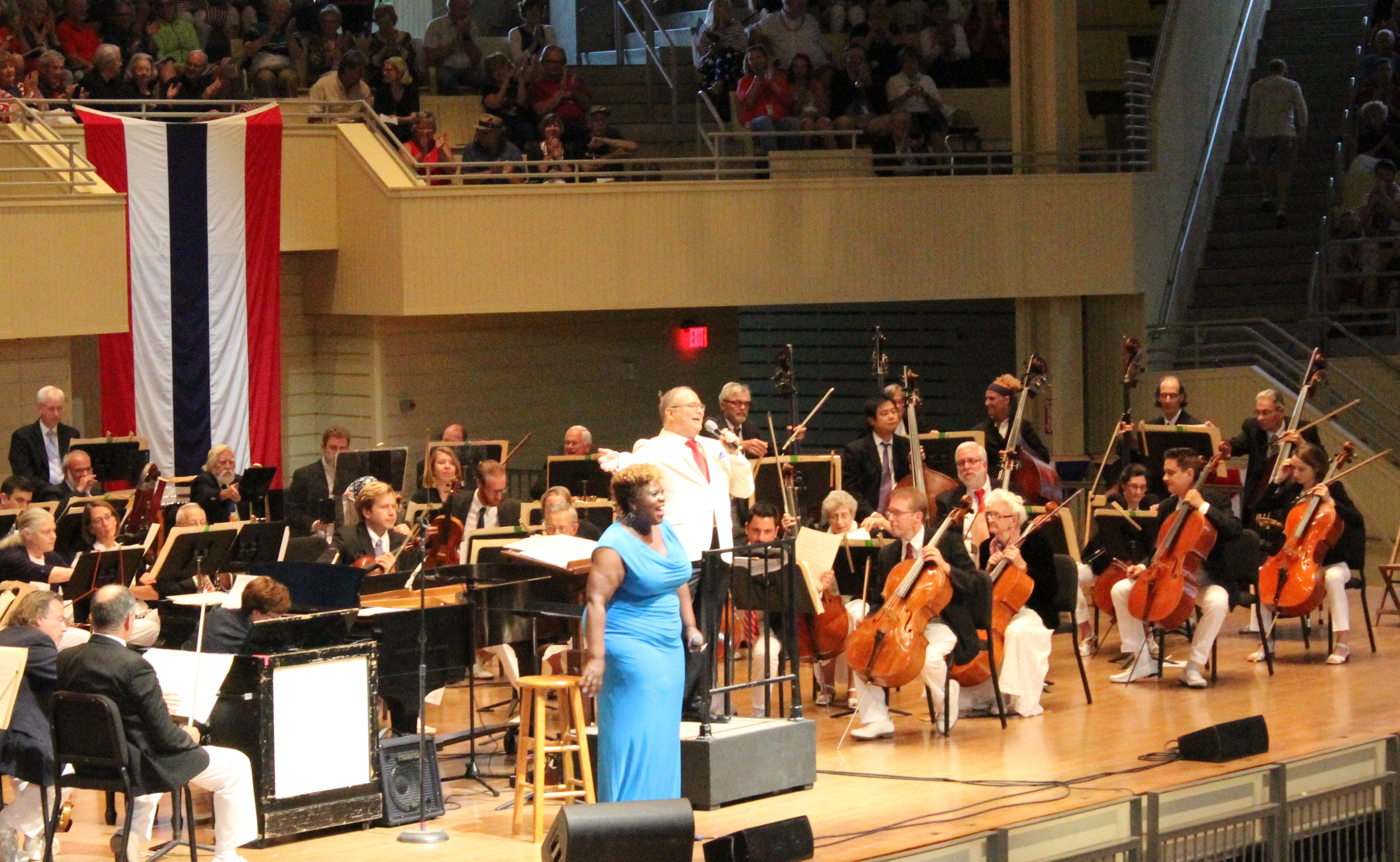
Jenkins with the Chautauqua Symphony Orchestra on July 4, 2017

Capathia Jenkins is an American actress and singer. She is best known for her work as a Broadway performer, with roles in shows such as Caroline, or Change, Newsies, and Martin Short's Fame Becomes Me.
