= Television Workshop =

British training organisation

The Television Workshop, formerly known as the Central Junior Television Workshop, is a British organisation that offers training for young people from working class backgrounds in performance skills for television, film, radio and theatre. Open to anybody between the ages of 7 and 21, the selection process takes place via an audition which is held each spring.

== History ==
The Central Junior Television Workshop was originally set up by Central Independent Television in 1983 to act as a casting pool for working class young talent in their broadcasting region in the English Midlands. The Workshop has two branches, the original one based in Nottingham and another based in Birmingham, which opened a year later in 1984.

The Workshop has been known as several different names, including the Central Junior TV Workshop, Carlton Junior TV Workshop, ITV Junior TV Workshop and most recently simply, the Television Workshop.

== Birmingham Workshop ==
In late 2008, the Birmingham workshop, run by director Colin Edwards and his assistant Ross Berkeley Simpson, lost funding from ITV due to the recession and so the Birmingham branch went "dark". At the same time Edwards retired.

In 2009, Simpson started a new, separate group called First Act Workshops to ensure that the work continued in Birmingham. Colin Edwards helped on a consultant level. First Act Workshops trains young actors in weekly sessions from Moseley Dance Centre.

The Nottingham branch of the Central Television Workshop still continues under the name the Television Workshop, under the helm of Alison Rashley.

== Notable people ==
=== Nottingham ===
- Jessie Mae Alonzo
- Finn Atkins
- Rosie Bentham
- Tom Blyth
- Harriet Cains
- Chanel Cresswell
- Joe Dempsie
- Jake Dunn
- Perry Fitzpatrick
- Harry Gilby
- Louis Greatorex
- Florence Hunt
- Oliver Huntingdon
- Toby Kebbell
- Erin Kellyman
- Oscar Kennedy
- Aisling Loftus
- Vicky McClure
- Ewan Mitchell
- Anjli Mohindra
- Samantha Morton
- Jorden Myrie
- Safia Oakley-Green
- Jack O'Connell
- Kia Pegg
- Bella Ramsey
- Mica Ricketts
- Marcus Rutherford
- Lauren Socha
- Eliot Otis Brown Walters
- Molly Windsor

=== Birmingham ===
- Bethany Antonia
- Donnaleigh Bailey
- Alison Hammond
- Felicity Jones
- Helen Monks
- Lorna Want

=== Unspecified ===
- Eve Austin
- Arian Nik

== Awards ==
- The Royal Television Society Midlands Award (1988)
- The British Film Institute Children's Award (1995)
- The Children's BAFTA in recognition of its outstanding development of young talent for film and television (2006)
