= Caroline, or Change =

Musical by Jeanine Tesori and Tony Kushner

- Music: Jeanine Tesori
- Lyrics: Tony Kushner
- Book: Tony Kushner
- Productions: 2003 Off-Broadway; 2004 Broadway; 2018 West End; 2021 Broadway revival
- Awards: Laurence Olivier Award for Best New Musical

Caroline, or Change is a musical with music by Jeanine Tesori and lyrics and book by Tony Kushner. The score combines spirituals, blues, Motown, classical music, and Jewish klezmer and folk music.

The show ran both Off-Broadway and on Broadway as well as in London.

== Production history ==
=== Workshops & Off-Broadway ===
The musical was first workshopped in 1999 at New York's Off-Broadway Public Theater. Director George C. Wolfe continued to workshop the musical at the Public Theater, where it opened on November 30, 2003, and closed on February 1, 2004.

=== Original Broadway Production ===
It transferred to Broadway at the Eugene O'Neill Theatre on May 2, 2004, and closed on August 29, 2004, after 136 performances and 22 previews. The musical starred Tonya Pinkins in the title role, Anika Noni Rose as Emmie Thibodeaux, Harrison Chad as Noah Gellman, Veanne Cox as Rose Stopnick Gellman and Chandra Wilson as Dotty Moffett (all both off-and on-Broadway). The choreographer was Hope Clarke; scenic design by Riccardo Hernandez; costume design by Paul Tazewell; and lighting design by Jules Fisher and Peggy Eisenhauer. Despite its relatively short run, it was critically acclaimed and nominated for six Tony Awards, including Best Musical – winning Best Featured Actress in a Musical for Anika Noni Rose.

=== Original London Production ===
Opening in October 2006, a London production at the National Theatre on the Lyttelton stage, also directed by Wolfe, ran in repertory with Marianne Elliott's production of Thérèse Raquin to January 2007. The production did not transfer to the West End but did win the Olivier Award for Best New Musical. The opening night cast in London starred Tonya Pinkins as Caroline. Other cast members included Pippa Bennett-Warner as Emmie Thibodeaux, Anna Francolini as Rose Stopnick Gellman, Hilton McRae as Mr. Stopnick, Perry Millward, Jonny Weldon and Greg Bernstein alternating as Noah, Clive Rowe as the dryer/bus, with Joy Malcolm, Ramona Keller, and Nataylia Roni, as the Radio.

=== 2018 London Revival ===
A revival was produced at the Minerva Theatre, Chichester as part of Daniel Evans' inaugural season as artistic director of Chichester Festival Theatre, running from 6 May to 3 June 2017. The production was directed by Michael Longhurst, starred Sharon D. Clarke as Caroline and received critical acclaim earning five star reviews. The production transferred with Clarke to the Hampstead Theatre, London from 12 March to 21 April 2018. The production transferred to the West End at the Playhouse Theatre, where it began playing on 20 November 2018, and ran until 2 March 2019, once again starring Clarke.

=== 2021 Broadway Revival ===
A Broadway revival by Roundabout Theatre Company based on the Chichester production initially was announced to start previews on March 13, 2020 and open on April 7, 2020, at Studio 54. On March 12, 2020, the show suspended production due to the COVID-19 pandemic. Rescheduled previews began October 8, 2021 and it officially opened on October 27 and ran through January 9, 2022. Direction was by Michael Longhurst with choreography by Ann Yee. The revival starred Sharon D. Clarke and Samantha Williams (Emmie).

=== Regional theatre ===
Tonya Pinkins and Anika Noni Rose reprised their roles in late 2004 at the Ahmanson Theatre, Los Angeles, California and in January to February 2005 at the Curran Theatre, San Francisco, California. Its premiere in The Washington, D.C., area at The Studio Theatre in 2006, starring Julia Nixon and Max Talisman, received rave reviews, and won the Helen Hayes Awards for Outstanding Lead Actress, Resident Musical (Nixon), and Outstanding Resident Musical. The Chicago premiere at the Court Theatre in fall 2008 earned four Jeff Awards for director Charles Newell, Musical Director Doug Peck, star E. Faye Butler, and best production of a musical at a large scale theater.

Other regional productions have included Main Street Theater, Houston, in January 2008 with Tamara Siler; Center Stage, Baltimore, Maryland, in December 2008 to January 2009 with E. Faye Butler; the Guthrie Theatre, Minneapolis, Minnesota, April to June 2009, the Gallery Players, Brooklyn, N.Y., January to February 2010, The Human Race Theatre Company, Dayton, Ohio November 4–20, 2011, and Syracuse Stage (Syracuse, New York) February 1-February 26, 2012. In 2017, the Round House Theatre in Bethesda, Maryland staged it as part of a season with a focus on Tony Kushner plays. Its Colorado regional premiere took place April 5 to May 5, 2019, at the Aurora Fox Arts Center, directed by Kenny Moten and starring Mary Louise Lee as Caroline.

A 2012 production by Acting Up Stage Company in Toronto, Ontario, garnered Dora Mavor Moore Awards for Outstanding Production of a Musical, Sterling Jarvis (principal actor), Arlene Duncan (principal actress) and Outstanding Musical Direction (Reza Jacobs). A new production by Acting Up Stage Company, now called The Musical Stage Company, in Toronto, Ontario played January 31 to February 16, 2020, starring Jully Black as Caroline and Canadian soprano Measha Brueggergosman as The Moon at the Elgin and Winter Garden Theatres.

== Plot ==
=== Act One ===
On a hot day in 1963 in Lake Charles, Louisiana, Caroline, a Black maid who works for the Gellman family for $30 a week, launders clothes in the basement ("16 Feet Beneath The Sea"). Caroline keeps herself sane in the basement by imagining the appliances in the basement as people ("The Radio"/"Laundry Quintet"). The Gellmans' 8-year-old son Noah, whose mother has recently died of cancer, is attracted to Caroline, a no-nonsense single parent ("Noah Down The Stairs"). Caroline allows Noah to light her one cigarette each day, a secret they can share ("The Cigarette"). Caroline puts the laundry in the dryer and sings about her four kids and cleaning houses for 22 years ("The Dryer"/"I Got Four Kids").

Noah's new stepmother Rose cannot give Caroline a raise, but tells her to take some extra food home to her kids ("Caroline, There's Extra Food"); Caroline declines. Noah's father Stuart, despondent since his wife's death, tells Noah he has lost his faith ("There is No God, Noah"). Noah confesses that he hates Rose ("Rose Stopnick Can Cook"). Rose confesses to her father, Mr. Stopnick, that she is unhappy as well, after uprooting her cushy New York lifestyle to move to the bayou with Stuart ("Long Distance").

After work, Caroline argues with her friend Dotty about each other's lifestyles ("Dotty and Caroline"). The moon rises as they wait for a bus ("Moon Change"). They discuss the recent mysterious destruction of a statue of a Confederate soldier at the courthouse ("Moon Trio"). The bus arrives with devastating news: President Kennedy has been assassinated ("The Bus"/"That Can't Be").

Rose tells Noah to stop leaving money in his pants pockets, and that any money Caroline finds in his laundry will be hers to keep ("Noah and Rose"). The Gellman family reminisces about the good President Kennedy did for the Jews and Dotty reminisces about the good he intended to do for African Americans ("Inside/Outside"/"JFK"). On the front porch of her house, Caroline tells her teenage daughter Emmie that the president is dead. Emmie says she does not care, because JFK never fulfilled his promises to the Black community ("No One Waiting"/"Night Mama"). Noah, awake in his bedroom, asks Caroline what laws she would pass if she were president ("Gonna Pass Me a Law"/"Noah Goes To Sleep").

Rose tells Caroline she is allowed to keep any money she finds in Noah's pants, to supplement her salary and teach Noah a lesson ("Noah Has a Problem"). Noah and his father, Stuart, have trouble bonding ("Stuart and Noah"). Noah, aware of Caroline's situation, purposefully leaves his candy and comic book money in his pockets, as well as 75 cents ("Quarter in the Bleach Cup"). Caroline feels bad about keeping it, but does so, out of necessity. Caroline brings the money to Emmie, Jackie, and the adorable little Joe who discuss all the things they can do and things they can buy with it ("Caroline Takes My Money Home"/"Roosevelt Petrucius Coleslaw").

=== Act Two ===
As Christmas approaches Caroline, ironing clothes in the basement, remembers her ex-husband, who was kind and thoughtful until he became abusive ("Santa Comin' Caroline"/"Little Reward"/"1943"). Rose tells Caroline to keep any money Stuart leaves in his clothes as well but Caroline snaps at Rose saying she does not need her pity or money and threatens her with the iron ("Mr. Gellman's Shirt"/"Ooh Child"). Rose then asks if she, Dotty, and Emmie will work at her upcoming Chanukah party ("Rose Recovers"). Emmie, Jackie, and Joe encourage her to keep taking the laundry money, because the family needs it ("I Saw Three Ships").

At the Chanukah party, Noah educates Emmie about the holiday ("The Chanukah Party"). Rose shoos Noah out of the kitchen ("Noah, Out! It's Very Rude") and Dotty tells Emmie about the courthouse statue ("Dotty and Emmie"). When Mr. Stopnick belittles Martin Luther King Jr.'s nonviolent civil disobedience, Emmie tells him white people have no right to be critical ("I Don't Want My Child To Hear That"/"Mr. Stopnick and Emmie"). Mr. Stopnick is impressed with Emmie's bravado, but Caroline tells her she cannot talk that way to white people; Emmie retorts that slavery is over. Caroline slaps Emmie ("Kitchen Fight"). Mr. Stopnick's Chanukah present to Noah is a $20 bill, intended as a life lesson about money and its value ("A Twenty Dollar Bill and Why"). At the bus stop, Emmie dreams of growing up to be independent and fighting for justice ("I Hate the Bus"). Back at the house, Stuart laments that he can give neither Rose nor Noah what they need ("Moon, Emmie, Stuart Trio").

Noah inadvertently leaves the $20 bill in his pants; after school he rushes to the basement, but Caroline has found it and says she is keeping it, per their agreement ("The Twenty Dollar Bill"). Noah and Caroline exchange racial insults, then Caroline returns the money and leaves ("Caroline and Noah Fight"). After five days, Caroline has not returned to work ("Aftermath"). Stuart and Rose find the bill and, in a rare moment of cooperating on parenting, confront Noah over what happened, but Noah is saved from punishment when Mr. Stopnick pretends the bill is his, satisfied that Noah learned his lesson. That Sunday on her way to church, Caroline realizes that the laundry money had only fostered greed and hatefulness; she asks God to free her from earthly desires ("Sunday Morning"/"Lot's Wife"). The radio sings of a fierce heartbreak ("Salty Teardrops"). At church, Caroline gives Emmie, Jackie, and Joe fierce hugs and accepts that her children will have better and different lives from the one she has had. ("How Long Has This Been Going On?").

Noah finally lets Rose tuck him into bed and kiss him goodnight. Caroline returns to work and assures Noah that although things will never be the same between them, Noah will learn to live with his sorrow and move on ("Why Does Our House Have a Basement?"/"Underwater"). Emmie reveals that she helped take down the Confederate soldier statue, and proudly sings that she is the daughter of a maid, but she will continue to work for a greater cause, and her children will have a brighter future. Jackie and Joe come out to shush her and she tells them that it is up to the children of Caroline Thibedeaux to change the future ("Epilogue").

== Musical numbers ==
Act One

Washer / Dryer

- 16 Feet Beneath The Sea — Caroline, The Washing Machine
- The Radio — The Radio
- Laundry Quintet— The Washing Machine, Caroline, The Radio
- Noah Down The Stairs — Noah
- The Cigarette — Noah and Caroline
- Laundry Finish— The Washing Machine, Caroline, The Radio
- The Dryer— The Dryer and The Radio
- I Got Four Kids— Caroline and The Dryer

Cabbage

- Caroline, There's Extra Food— Rose, Caroline and The Gellmans
- There Is No God, Noah— Stuart
- Rose Stopnick Can Cook— The Gellmans
- Long Distance— Rose

Moon Change

- Dotty and Caroline— Dotty and Caroline
- Moon Change— The Moon
- Moon Trio— Dotty, Caroline, and The Moon
- The Bus— The Bus
- That Can't Be— The Bus, Rose, Dotty and Caroline
- Noah and Rose— Rose and Noah
- Inside / Outside — The Moon, Noah and Rose
- JFK —Dotty, Grandpa Gellman and Grandma Gellman

Duets

- No One Waitin' — Emmie, Caroline, and The Radio
- 'Night Mamma — Emmie
- Gonna Pass Me A Law — Noah and Caroline
- Stop Botherin’ The Night — Caroline

The Bleach Cup

- Noah Has A Problem — Rose and Caroline
- Stuart and Noah — Stuart, Noah and Rose
- The Bleach Cup — Caroline, Noah and The Washing Machine
- Roosevelt Petrucius Coleslaw — Emmie, Jackie, Joe, Noah, Caroline and The Moon

Act Two

Ironing

- Santa Comin' Caroline — The Radio
- Little Reward — The Radio, The Washing Machine, and Caroline
- 1943 — Caroline, The Washing Machine, and The Radio
- Mr. Gellman's Shirt — Rose and Caroline
- Ooh Child — The Washing Machine and The Radio
- Rose Recovers — Rose, The Dryer and Caroline
- I Saw Three Ships — Emmie, Jackie, Joe and Caroline

The Chanukah Party

- The Chanukah Party — Grandma Gellman, Grandpa Gellman, Mr. Stopnick, Rose, Noah, Caroline, and Emmie
- Dotty and Emmie — Dotty and Emmie
- I Don't Want My Child To Hear That — Caroline, Mr. Stopnick
- Mr. Stopnick and Emmie — Mr. Stopnick and Emmie
- Kitchen Fight — Caroline, Emmie, and Dotty
- A Twenty Dollar Bill and Why — Mr. Stopnick
- I Hate The Bus — Emmie
- Moon, Emmie and Stuart Trio — The Moon, Emmie, Stuart

The Twenty Dollar Bill

- The Twenty Dollar Bill — Noah, The Gellmans
- Caroline and Noah Fight — Caroline, The Dryer and Noah

Aftermath

- Aftermath — Noah, The Dryer, Rose, Stuart, Mr. Stopnick
- Rose Waltz – Rose, Mr. Stopnick, Stuart

Lot's Wife

- Sunday Morning — Caroline and Dotty
- Lot's Wife — Caroline

How Long Has This Been Going On?

- Salty Teardrops — The Radio
- Why Does Our House Have A Basement? — Noah, Rose, and Caroline
- Underwater — Caroline

Emmie's Dream

- Epilogue — Emmie, Jackie, and Joe

== Characters ==
- Caroline Thibodeaux: 39-year-old African-American maid for the Gellmans, a middle-class Jewish family
- Noah Gellman: The Gellmans' 8-year-old curious, sympathetic, and neurotic son
- Emmie Thibodeaux: Caroline's 16-year-old free-spirited daughter, supporter of Martin Luther King Jr. and the Civil Rights Movement
- Rose Stopnick Gellman: Noah's concerned new stepmother from New York City, marries Stuart after his first wife's death
- Stuart Gellman: Professional clarinet player and Noah's father, mourning the loss of his wife
- Dotty Moffett: Friend of Caroline and fellow maid, takes night classes at the University
- The Radio: Domestic appliance portrayed by a Supremes-like trio, serves as a Greek Chorus for the show
- The Washing Machine: Domestic appliance portrayed by an actor, cleans clothes for the Gellmans and pushes Caroline to move forward in life
- The Dryer: Domestic appliance portrayed by an actor, torments Caroline throughout the show
- The Moon: Portrayed by an actor, is a calming and healing presence throughout the show
- The Bus: Portrayed by an actor, is the primary source of transportation for the African-American characters in the show
- Jackie Thibodeaux: Caroline's 10-year-old son
- Joe Thibodeaux: Caroline's 8-year-old son
- Mr. Stopnick: Rose's father, a Jewish man with a socialist ideology from New York City
- Grandpa Gellman: Noah's grandfather, Stuart's father
- Grandma Gellman: Noah's grandmother, Stuart's mother

== Notable casts ==
| Character | Off-Broadway | Broadway | London | Chichester | Off-West End Revival | West End Revival | Broadway Revival |
| Character | 2003 | 2004 | 2006 | 2017 | 2018 | | 2021 |
|---|---|---|---|---|---|---|---|
| Caroline Thibodeaux | Tonya Pinkins | Tonya Pinkins | Tonya Pinkins | Sharon D. Clarke | Sharon D. Clarke | Sharon D. Clarke | Sharon D. Clarke |
| Noah Gellman | Harrison Chad | Harrison Chad | Greg Bernstein; Perry Millward; Jonny Weldon | Charlie Gallacher; Daniel Luniku | Charlie Gallacher; Aaron Gelkoff | Isaac Forward; Aaron Gelkoff; Jack Meredit | Jaden Myles Waldman; Gabriel Amoroso; Adam Makke |
| Emmie Thibodeaux | Anika Noni Rose | Anika Noni Rose | Pippa Bennett-Warner | Abiona Omonua | Abiona Omonua | Abiona Omonua | Samantha Williams |
| Rose Stopnick Gellman | Veanne Cox | Veanne Cox | Anna Francolini | Lauren Ward | Lauren Ward | Lauren Ward | Caissie Levy |
| Stuart Gellman | David Costabile | David Costabile | Richard Henders | Alex Gaumond | Alastair Brookshaw | Alastair Brookshaw | John Cariani |
| Dotty Moffett | Chandra Wilson | Chandra Wilson | Nora Cole | Nicola Hughes | Naana Agyei-Ampadu | Naana Agyei-Ampadu | Tamika Lawrence |
| The Radio | Tracy Nicole Chapman; Marva Hicks; Ramona Keller; Ledisi | Tracy Nicole Chapman; Marva Hicks; Ramona Keller; Ledisi | Ramona Keller, Joy Malcolm, Nataylia Roni | Keisha Amponsa Banson, Gloria Ontiri, Jennifer Saayeng | T’Shan Williams, Sharon Rose, Carole Stennentt | Keisha Amponsa Banson, Dujonna Gift-Simms, Tanisha Spring | Nasia Thomas, Nya; Harper Miles |
| The Washing Machine | Capathia Jenkins | Capathia Jenkins; Ledisi | Malinda Paris | Me’sha Bryan | Me’sha Bryan | Me’sha Bryan | Arica Jackson |
| The Dryer / The Bus | Chuck Cooper | Chuck Cooper | Clive Rowe | Ako Mitchell | Ako Mitchell | Ako Mitchell | Kevin S. McAllister |
| The Moon | Adriane Lenox | Aisha de Haas | Angela M Caesar | Angela M Caesar | Angela M Caesar | Angela M Caesar | N’Kenge |
| Jackie Thibodeaux | Kevin Ricardo Tate | Leon Thomas III | Ronald Chabvuka; Louis Ekoku; Mitchell Zhanghaza | James Gava; Zephan Hanson Amissah | Kenya Sandy; Mickell Stewart-Grimes | Mark Mwangi; Kenya Sandy; Jeremiah Waysome | Alexander Bello |
| Joe Thibodeaux | Marcus Carl Franklin | Marcus Carl Franklin | Kazim Benson; Kuan Frye; Jamal Hope | Josiah Choto; Teni Taiwo | Josiah Choto; David Dube | Josiah Choto; David Dube; Raphael Higgins-Hume | Jayden Theophile |
| Mr. Stopnick | Larry Keith | Larry Keith | Hilton McRae | Teddy Kempner | Teddy Kempner | Teddy Kempner | Chip Zien |
| Grandma Gellman | Alice Playten | Alice Playten | Valda Aviks | Beverley Klein | Sue Kelvin | Sue Kelvin | Joy Hermalyn |
| Grandpa Gellman | Reathel Bean | Reathel Bean | Ian Lavender | Vincent Pirillo | Vincent Pirillo | Vincent Pirillo | Stuart Zagnit |

== Awards and nominations ==
=== Original Broadway production ===
| Year | Award | Category | Nominee | Result |
|---|---|---|---|---|
| 2004 | Tony Award | Best Musical | | Nominated |
| 2004 | Tony Award | Best Book of a Musical | Tony Kushner | Nominated |
| 2004 | Tony Award | Best Original Score | Jeanine Tesori and Tony Kushner | Nominated |
| 2004 | Tony Award | Best Performance by a Leading Actress in a Musical | Tonya Pinkins | Nominated |
| 2004 | Tony Award | Best Performance by a Featured Actress in a Musical | Anika Noni Rose | Won |
| 2004 | Tony Award | Best Direction of a Musical | George C. Wolfe | Nominated |
| 2004 | Drama Desk Award | Outstanding Musical | | Nominated |
| 2004 | Drama Desk Award | Outstanding Book of a Musical | Tony Kushner | Nominated |
| 2004 | Drama Desk Award | Outstanding Actress in a Musical | Tonya Pinkins | Nominated |
| 2004 | Drama Desk Award | Outstanding Featured Actress in a Musical | Anika Noni Rose | Nominated |
| 2004 | Drama Desk Award | Outstanding Director of a Musical | George C. Wolfe | Nominated |
| 2004 | Drama Desk Award | Outstanding Music | Jeanine Tesori | Won |

=== Original London production ===
| Year | Award | Category | Nominee | Result |
|---|---|---|---|---|
| 2007 | Laurence Olivier Awards | Best New Musical | | Won |
| 2007 | Laurence Olivier Awards | Best Actress in a Musical | Tonya Pinkins | Nominated |
| 2007 | Laurence Olivier Awards | Best Supporting Performance in a Musical | Anna Francolini | Nominated |

=== 2017 Chichester/Hampstead/West End revival ===
| Year | Award | Category | Nominee | Result |
|---|---|---|---|---|
| 2017 | UK Theatre Award | Best Musical Production | | Nominated |
| 2017 | UK Theatre Award | Best Performance in a Musical | Sharon D. Clarke | Nominated |
| 2017 | BroadwayWorld UK Award | Best New Production of a Musical | | Nominated |
| 2018 | Evening Standard Theatre Award | Best Musical | | Nominated |
| 2018 | Evening Standard Theatre Award | Best Musical Performance | Sharon D. Clarke | Nominated |
| 2019 | Laurence Olivier Award | Best Musical Revival | | Nominated |
| 2019 | Laurence Olivier Award | Best Actress in a Musical | Sharon D. Clarke | Won |
| 2019 | Laurence Olivier Award | Best Costume Design | Fly Davis | Nominated |
| 2019 | Black British Theatre Award | Best Female Actor in a Musical | Sharon D. Clarke | Won |
| 2019 | Stage Debut Award | Child Performer of the Year | Jack Meredith | Nominated |

=== 2021 Broadway revival ===
| Year | Award | Category | Nominee | Result |
|---|---|---|---|---|
| 2022 | Drama League Awards | Outstanding Revival of a Broadway or Off-Broadway Musical | | Nominated |
| 2022 | Drama League Awards | Distinguished Performance | Sharon D. Clarke | Nominated |
| 2022 | Drama Desk Awards | Outstanding Revival of a Musical | | Nominated |
| 2022 | Drama Desk Awards | Outstanding Actress in a Musical | Sharon D. Clarke | Nominated |
| 2022 | Outer Critics Circle Awards | Outstanding Revival of a Musical (Broadway or Off-Broadway) | | Nominated |
| 2022 | Outer Critics Circle Awards | Outstanding Actress in a Musical | Sharon D. Clarke | Nominated |
| 2022 | Theatre World Award | | Sharon D. Clarke | Honoree |
| 2022 | Tony Awards | Best Revival of a Musical | | Nominated |
| 2022 | Tony Awards | Best Actress in a Musical | Sharon D. Clarke | Nominated |
| 2022 | Tony Awards | Best Costume Design in a Musical | Fly Davis | Nominated |
| 2023 | Grammy Awards | Best Musical Theater Album | Principal soloists, album producers, composer and lyricist. | Nominated |
