= Christiani Pitts =

American actress

- Pitts in 2026
- Born: 9 March 1993 (age 33)
- Education: Florida State University (BFA)
- Occupations: Actress; singer; dancer
- Children: 1

Christiani Pitts is an American actress, singer and dancer. She has originated the roles of Ann Darrow in the musical King Kong and was nominated for the Tony Award for Best Actress in a Musical and Grammy Award for Best Musical Theater Album for her performance as Robin Rainey in Two Strangers (Carry a Cake Across New York).

== Early life ==
She is the daughter of Byron Pitts, the anchor of ABC's Nightline. She started in theatre in Atlanta and New Jersey, and moved to New York City after graduating from Florida State University.

== Career ==
Pitts debuted on Broadway in 2017 in the ensemble of the musical A Bronx Tale. She was later a replacement for the role of Jane. From 2018 to 2019, she played Ann Darrow in King Kong on Broadway. She was called the first woman of color to play the role. Slate called Pitts "a wonder herself, a rawly funny actor with a five-alarm voice", while Observer called her acting "wooden".

In April 2025, Pitts was cast as Robin in the American premiere of Two Strangers (Carry a Cake Across New York) at the American Repertory Theater. Pitts said she was drawn to the role because "[t]his is a Black woman who gets to explore [wanting to be happy] without any severe trauma or pain attached to it". The Bay State Banner said Pitts's performance added "dimension" to the character, calling her charismatic, and New York Stage Review said she "pitches in with tenderness in her solos, and lightning-fast timing when it’s called for".

In August 2025, Pitts played Hannah in a production of Come From Away at The Cape Playhouse. It was confirmed Two Strangers (Carry a Cake Across New York) would transfer to Broadway, with Pitts reprising her role. The production began previews at the Longacre Theatre on November 1, 2025, and opened on November 20, 2025. It is actively showing as of June 14th, 2026.

== Filmography ==
=== Film ===
| Year | Title | Role |
|---|---|---|
| 2011 | Big Mommas: Like Father, Like Son | Diva #2 |
| 2021 | Resort to Love | Beverly Strattford |

=== TV ===
| Year | Title | Role | Notes |
|---|---|---|---|
| 2018 | Elementary | Allison | Episode: Nobody Lives Forever |
| 2019 | Evil | Annie Commerce | Episode: 2 Fathers |
| 2020 | The Good Fight | Melanie Evers | Episode: The Gang Offends Everyone |
| 2022 | Blue Bloods | Deanna Parker | Episode: Allegiance |
| 2023 | Dead Ringers (miniseries) | Lily | Episode: Six |
| 2021–2026 | Power Book III: Raising Kanan | Pernessa Reed | 15 episodes |

== Theatre ==
| Year | Title | Role | Venue |
|---|---|---|---|
| 2016–2018 | A Bronx Tale | Denise / Jane | Longacre Theatre |
| 2018–2019 | King Kong | Ann Darrow | Broadway Theatre |
| 2025 | Two Strangers (Carry a Cake Across New York) | Robin Rainey | American Repertory Theater |
| 2025 | Come from Away | Hannah | The Cape Playhouse |
| 2025–2026 | Two Strangers (Carry a Cake Across New York) | Robin Rainey | Longacre Theatre |

== Awards and nominations ==
| Year | Award | Category | Work | Result | Ref. |
|---|---|---|---|---|---|
| 2026 | Drama League Award | Distinguished Performance | Two Strangers (Carry a Cake Across New York) | Nominated | |
| 2026 | Broadway.com Audience Choice Awards | Favorite Leading Actress in a Musical | Two Strangers (Carry a Cake Across New York) | Nominated | |
| 2026 | Broadway.com Audience Choice Awards | Favorite Onstage Pair (with Sam Tutty) | Two Strangers (Carry a Cake Across New York) | Won | |
| 2026 | Broadway.com Audience Choice Awards | Performance of the Year (Musical) | Two Strangers (Carry a Cake Across New York) | Nominated | |
| 2026 | Tony Awards | Best Performance by an Actress in a Leading Role in a Musical | Two Strangers (Carry a Cake Across New York) | Nominated | |
| 2027 | Grammy Awards | Best Musical Theater Album | Two Strangers (Carry a Cake Across New York) | Pending | |
