= Sam Tutty =

English actor (born 1998)

- Tutty in 2026
- Born: 9 April 1998 (age 28); Crawley, West Sussex, England
- Education: Imberhorne School; Italia Conti Academy of Theatre Arts
- Occupation: Actor
- Years active: 2019–present
- Notable work: Dear Evan Hansen (2019–2022); Two Strangers (Carry a Cake Across New York) (2023–2026)
- Awards: Critics' Circle Theatre Award for Most Promising Newcomer (2019); WhatsOnStage Award for Best Actor in a Musical (2020); Laurence Olivier Award for Best Actor in a Musical (2020)

Sam Tutty (born 9 April 1998) is an English actor. He is best known for his title role in the West End production of the musical Dear Evan Hansen, for which he won the Olivier Award for Best Actor in a Leading Role in a Musical. He also originated the role of Dougal in the UK theatre run of Two Strangers (Carry a Cake Across New York), and remained with the show when it transferred to Broadway, earning him a nomination for the Tony Award for Best Actor in a Musical and the Grammy Award for Best Musical Theater Album.

In 2021, he briefly joined the cast of the Channel 4 soap opera Hollyoaks as Timmy Simons.

== Early life and education ==
Sam Tutty was born on 9 April 1998 in Crawley, West Sussex. His father left when he was ten years old and he, his mother, and younger brother soon moved to Hull. After returning to West Sussex, Tutty attended Imberhorne Secondary School, notably appearing in many school productions such as The Wizard of Oz. Tutty attended the Italia Conti Academy of Theatre Arts, where he learned to dance, amassed his repertoire of songs, and gained his foundation in theatre etiquette.

== Acting career ==
Tutty made his off-West End debut as Daniel in the British Theater Academy's production of Once on This Island at the Southwark Playhouse. After an intensive auditions process, in which he was originally cast as Evan's alternate, Tutty was cast as the main Evan Hansen in the West End production of Dear Evan Hansen at the Noel Coward Theatre. Previews for the show began on 29 October 2019 and the show officially opened on 19 November 2019. Tutty's performance gained widespread praise from critics. He went on to receive numerous awards, including Laurence Olivier Award for Best Actor in a Musical in 2020. At age 22, he is one of the youngest winners of the most prestigious UK theatrical award.

On 25 May 2021, it was announced that Tutty had joined the cast of the Channel 4 soap opera Hollyoaks. He made his debut appearance as Timmy Simons on 4 June 2021. After 21 episodes, the character was killed off to allow Tutty to reprise his role of Evan Hansen after the reopening of the West End production in October 2021, following the forced closure due to the COVID-19 pandemic. In 2022, Tutty performed the song "Heart of a Stranger" for The Robbie Sherman Songbook.

In December 2023, Tutty starred as Dougal in the two-hander romantic comedy musical Two Strangers (Carry a Cake Across New York) at the Kiln Theatre alongside Dujonna Gift. The production earned positive reviews and box office, leading to it extending its run until 20 January 2024. The show then transferred to the West End, opening at the Criterion Theatre from 23 April to 31 August 2024, again extending its run due to popular demand. Tutty remained with the production when it transferred to the American Repertory Theater in Cambridge, Massachusetts alongside Christiani Pitts in from May to July 2025. Tutty made his Broadway debut when the show began previews on 1 November 2025 at the Longacre Theatre, with the official opening night taking place on 20 November. His performance received critical acclaim and led to him being nominated for the Outer Critics Circle Award for Outstanding Lead Performer in a Broadway Musical, Drama Desk Award for Outstanding Lead Performance in a Musical, and Tony Award for Best Actor in a Musical. Tutty also appears on both the Original London Cast Recording and the Original Broadway Cast Recording with both Gift and Pitts respectively.

== Theatre credits ==
| Year | Title | Role | Notes | Ref. |
|---|---|---|---|---|
| 2019 | Once on This Island | Daniel | Southwark Playhouse | |
| 2019–2022 | Dear Evan Hansen | Evan Hansen | Noël Coward Theatre | |
| 2023 | Two Strangers (Carry a Cake Across New York) | Dougal Todd | Kiln Theatre | |
| 2024 | Two Strangers (Carry a Cake Across New York) | Dougal Todd | Criterion Theatre | |
| 2025 | Two Strangers (Carry a Cake Across New York) | Dougal Todd | American Repertory Theater | |
| 2025 | Two Strangers (Carry a Cake Across New York) | Dougal Todd | Longacre Theatre | |

== Filmography ==
| Year | Title | Role | Notes | Ref. |
|---|---|---|---|---|
| 2021 | Hollyoaks | Timmy Simons | Recurring role (21 episodes) | |
| 2021 | Romeo and Juliet | Romeo Montague | Filmed theatre performance | |
| 2021 | Four Minute Warning | Sam | Short film | |

== Accolades ==
| Year | Award | Category | Show | Result | Ref. |
|---|---|---|---|---|---|
| 2019 | Critics' Circle Theater Award | Most Promising Newcomer | Dear Evan Hansen | Won | |
| 2020 | WhatsOnStage Award | Best Actor in a Leading Role in a Musical | Dear Evan Hansen | Won | |
| 2020 | Mousetrap Awards | Watch This Face | Dear Evan Hansen | Won | |
| 2020 | Laurence Olivier Award | Best Actor in a Leading Role in a Musical | Dear Evan Hansen | Won | |
| 2020 | The Stage Debut Awards | Best Performer in a Musical | Dear Evan Hansen | Won | |
| 2020 | The Stage Debut Awards | Best West End Debut Performer | Dear Evan Hansen | Won | |
| 2026 | Outer Critics Circle Award | Outstanding Lead Performer in a Broadway Musical | Two Strangers (Carry a Cake Across New York) | Nominated | |
| 2026 | Drama Desk Award | Outstanding Lead Performance in a Musical | Two Strangers (Carry a Cake Across New York) | Nominated | |
| 2026 | Broadway.com Audience Choice Awards | Favorite Leading Actor in a Musical | Two Strangers (Carry a Cake Across New York) | Nominated | |
| 2026 | Broadway.com Audience Choice Awards | Favorite Funny Performance | Two Strangers (Carry a Cake Across New York) | Won | |
| 2026 | Broadway.com Audience Choice Awards | Favorite Onstage Pair (with Christiani Pitts) | Two Strangers (Carry a Cake Across New York) | Won | |
| 2026 | Broadway.com Audience Choice Awards | Favorite Breakthrough Performance (Male) | Two Strangers (Carry a Cake Across New York) | Nominated | |
| 2026 | Tony Awards | Best Performance by a Leading Actor in a Musical | Two Strangers (Carry a Cake Across New York) | Nominated | |
| 2026 | Dorian Award | Outstanding Lead Performance in a Broadway Musical | Two Strangers (Carry a Cake Across New York) | Nominated | |
| 2027 | Grammy Awards | Best Musical Theater Album | Two Strangers (Carry a Cake Across New York) | Pending | |

== See also ==
- List of British actors
