= Here We Go (TV series) =

British television series by Tom Basden

- Promotional poster
- Also known as: Pandemonium
- Genre: Sitcom
- Created by: Tom Basden
- Written by: Tom Basden
- Directed by: Will Sinclair (series); Ella Jones (pilot)
- Starring: Jim Howick; Katherine Parkinson; Alison Steadman; Tom Basden; Tori Allen-Martin; Freya Parks; Mica Ricketts; Jude Morgan-Collie
- Country of origin: United Kingdom
- Original language: English
- No. of series: 3
- No. of episodes: 22

Production
- Executive producers: Josh Cole; Tom Basden; Steven Canny
- Producer: Tom Jordan
- Running time: 29 minutes

Original release
- Network: BBC One
- Release: 30 December 2020 – present

Here We Go is a British sitcom created and written by Tom Basden for the BBC. It stars Jim Howick, Katherine Parkinson, Alison Steadman and Tori Allen-Martin alongside Basden. The pilot episode, originally titled Pandemonium, was broadcast on 30 December 2020, commissioned as part of the long-running Comedy Playhouse strand.

The first series was broadcast in 2022. A second and third were commissioned in 2023, which were shown from February 2024, and July 2025 respectively. A fourth series was commissioned in October 2025.

For their performances in the series, Howick and Parkinson were nominated for Best Male and Best Female Comedy Performance respectively at the 2026 British Academy Television Awards, with Parkinson going on to win in her category.

== Premise ==
Set in the town of Bedford, from the point of view of the handheld camera of teenage son Sam, and flashbacks to earlier times, the dysfunctional and eccentric Jessop family's trials and tribulations are documented.

== Cast and characters ==
=== Main ===
- Jim Howick as Paul Jessop, Sam and Amy's uncool father, and Rachel's husband
- Katherine Parkinson as Rachel Jessop, Sam and Amy's neurotic mother, Robin's sister, and Paul's wife
- Alison Steadman as Sue Jessop, Paul's jovial mother
- Tom Basden as Robin, Rachel's eager-to-please brother
- Tori Allen-Martin as Cherry, Robin's strong-minded fiancée
- Freya Parks as Amy Jessop, Paul and Rachel's sardonic daughter, Sam's sister, and Maya's girlfriend
- Mica Ricketts as Maya, Amy's girlfriend
- Jack Christou (2020) and Jude Morgan-Collie (2022–) as Sam Jessop, Paul and Rachel's stoic son, Amy's brother and the cameraman

=== Supporting ===
- Ed Kear as Dean, Robin's surly mate
- Jon Furlong as Jelson, Robin's friend
- Esen Hurer as Kaye, Cherry's friend
- Katy Wix as Kim Sinclair, a classmate of Rachel's from school (series 1 episode 2)
- Mark Williams as Frank, a local painter with a conceited attitude towards his art (series 1 episode 3)
- Tim Key as Ray, a former Olympic teammate of Paul's (series 1 episode 4)
- Vincent Riotta as Alf, Sue's new boyfriend who's unenthusiastic about how she treats their relationship (series 1 episode 5)
- Camille Ucan as Diane, an estate agent suspicious of Paul's undercover activities (series 1 episode 5)
- Ninette Finch as Bren, a reticent friend of Sue's (series 1 episode 5, series 3 episode 8)
- Mark Cox as a policeman (series 1 episode 6)
- Gia Hunter as Leah, a potential love interest of Sam (series 1 episode 6)
- Brydie Service as Fara, a student on Rachel's course (series 2 episode 1)
- Aidan Cheng as Xiaoming, a student on Rachel's course (series 2 episode 1)
- Harry Enfield as Edgar, a neighbour of the Jessops (series 2 episode 2)
- Yvette Robinson as Annie, a neighbour of the Jessops (series 2 episode 2)
- Olivia Isaacs as Cass, a friend of Sam's (series 2 episode 2)
- Ned Porteous as Ugly Chris, a chef and friend of Cherry (series 2 episode 3)
- Andrew Brooke as Greg, a detective (series 2 episode 3)
- Paul Longley as Fozzie, a detective (series 2 episode 3)
- Sophie Wu as Zoe, a recruit on Paul's course (series 2 episode 3)
- Bobby Lockwood as Carl, a stripper (series 2 episode 4)
- Dolly Wells as Penny, Rachel's sister (series 2 episode 5)
- Simon Farnaby as Boyd, Penny's husband (series 2 episodes 5 and 6)
- Bonnie Adair as Sara (series 2 episode 5)
- John Atterbury as John (series 2 episode 5)
- Elena Dinca as Katya (series 2 episode 6)
- Warren Caswell as Chief Superintendent (series 2 episode 6)
- Patrick Miller as Ben (series 2 episode 6)
- James Benson as Vicar (series 2 episode 6)
- Jax James as Stanley, Sam and Amy's cousin (series 2 episode 6)
- Preston Thomas-Gillespie as Adam (Christmas Special)
- Alex Macqueen as Dermot, an overzealous acquaintance of Rachel (Christmas Special)
- Abbie Murphy as Dr. Hirst (Christmas Special)
- Ruby Wallin as Tia (Christmas Special)
- Celeste Wong as Astrid (Christmas Special)
- Mark Davison as Mike (Christmas Special)
- Jamali Maddix as Jon Boy, a smart lock installer (series 3 episode 1)
- Seb Cardinal as Joe, a prospective neighbour of the Jessops (series 3 episode 2)
- Susannah Fielding as Susie, a prospective neighbour of the Jessops (series 3 episode 2)
- James McGregor as Jamie (series 3 episode 2)
- Josephine Welcome as Prudence, a friend of Sue (series 3 episode 2)
- Will Barton as Sebastian, a LARPer and Surgeon (series 3 episode 3)
- Pavel Douglas as Merlin (series 3 episode 3)
- Tom Gaskin as Lee, Paul's police mentor (series 3 episode 3)
- Paul Hawkyard as Cliff, a farmer (series 3 episode 3)
- Austin Haynes as Ryan, a friend of Sam (series 3 episode 3)
- Andrey Rogozin as Marcin (series 3 episode 3)
- Zayne Wint as Kai, a friend of Sam (series 3 episode 3)
- Sarah Daykin as Lois, a modelling agent (series 3 episode 4)
- David Hallows as Roland Flatley (series 3 episode 4)
- Rachael McGuinness as Stevie (series 3 episode 4)
- Eileen O'Brien as Anne Flatley, a school friend of Sue (series 3 episode 4)
- Jane Horrocks as Ethel Ticehurst, a conspiracy theorist who plays Uno with Sue (series 3 episode 5)
- Robert Glenister as Michael, Rachel and Robin's Dad (series 3 episode 6)
- Stevie Martin as Ruby, a Scuba diving instructor (series 3 episode 6)
- Kathryn Drysdale as Katie, Dean's Girlfriend (series 3 episode 7)
- Kevin Garry as Father Damian (series 3 episode 7)
- Horatio Gould as Graham/G, Amy's bandmate (series 3 episode 7)
- Sunil Patel as a Chemist (series 3 episode 67
- Yasmin Al-Khudhairi as Poppy, a party host (series 3 episode 8)
- Christina Ngoyi as Stella, a guest at Poppy's party (series 3 episode 8)
- Marelyn Pielago as Holly, Sam's girfriend (series 3 episode 8)

== Episodes ==
Series	Episodes	Originally released	
Series	Episodes	First released	Last released
1	Pilot	30 December 2020	
1	6	22 April 2022	3 June 2022
2	Special	22 December 2023	
2	6	2 February 2024	8 March 2024
3	7	25 July 2025	5 September 2025

=== Series 1 (2022) ===
No. overall	No. in series	Title	Directed by	Written by	Original release date	UK viewers (millions) (Note: 28-day consolidated)
Pilot
1	–	"Pandemonium"	Ella Jones	Tom Basden	30 December 2020	3.40
15-year-old Sam has taken to filming his dysfunctional family as part of school coursework, and captures them as they celebrate what they hope will be a fantastic 2020 – a holiday to the United States, his mother Rachel's new business, family rascal Robin settling down with his haughty fiancée, and family matriarch Sue finally getting her hip replacement. The realities of the arrival of coronavirus are realised, and documented, that October, when Rachel's determination to give the family a holiday takes them to drudgy, overcast Margate, Kent; the pressure grows and leads to bizarre outcomes.
Series
2	1	"Mum's Birthday Voucher"	Will Sinclair	Tom Basden	29 April 2022	3.05
A Wowcher for Rachel's birthday to a theme park ends up being consistently forgotten about for six months, when the family decide to use it on the last day it is valid. Sue makes matters worse by bringing the dog the neighbours entrusted to her to look after for them. Amy seeks misguided relationship advice from Robin, whose relationship with Cherry is off once again.
3	2	"Amy's Job Interview"	Will Sinclair	Tom Basden	29 April 2022 (online); 6 May 2022 (broadcast)	1.68
Paul's decision to join his brother-in-law Robin in trying to keep fit goes awry as he tries to boost his ego through a career on YouTube, while Rachel believes she has put her foot in it when she realises that the boss of the company daughter Amy is interviewing for is a stuck-up classmate from school.
4	3	"Cherry's Salsa Class"	Will Sinclair	Tom Basden	29 April 2022 (online); 13 May 2022 (broadcast)	N/A
Rachel is determined to fix the family portrait, believing the uppity artist they hired has deliberately aged her. Paul and Amy end up competing for the same job. Robin and Cherry's salsa classes get off to an underwhelming start, while Sue's surprise "gift" of a pool provides both entertainment and horror.
5	4	"Dad's Bronze Medal"	Will Sinclair	Tom Basden	29 April 2022 (online); 20 May 2022 (broadcast)	N/A
Paul's annual teasing by Ray, a former Olympic teammate who went to Beijing over him, leads to the family encouraging him to confront him over their beliefs it was done through underhand tactics – not helped by Rachel's former romantic encounters with him. Amy becomes concerned about Maya's stalker-cum-friend at uni, Sue's resolve is tested when she decides to become a twitcher, and Sam gets distracted from his filming.
6	5	"Granny's New Boyfriend"	Will Sinclair	Tom Basden	29 April 2022 (online); 27 May 2022 (broadcast)	N/A
The family's hesitance towards Sue's new boyfriend, Alf, turns into approval when they discover he is the owner of a local Italian restaurant with the bonus of free meals – although that is not strictly a mutual arrangement. Amy's troubles with her on-off relationship with Maya rear their head again, Rachel attempts to improve her rusty Italian, and Robin ropes Paul into going undercover at the estate agent's he believes Cherry's new boyfriend works at.
7	6	"Our Holiday in Scotland"	Will Sinclair	Tom Basden	29 April 2022 (online); 3 June 2022 (broadcast)	1.42
Taking the family holiday to Scotland already proved contentious, but especially when it is revealed it is so Robin can try a last-ditch attempt to win Cherry back at her wedding. Paul and Rachel become strained when he learns she was behind the whole thing, Amy grows resolutely against her mother's interference in her life and what she should do with it, and in the end it looks like romance could be on the cards for more than Sam behind the lens.

=== Series 2 (2024) ===
No. overall	No. in series	Title	Directed by	Written by	Original release date	UK viewers (millions)
Special
8	–	"Mum's Classic Family Christmas"	Will Sinclair	Tom Basden	22 December 2023	1.72
Rachel's desperation to have a traditional family Christmas, as when the kids were little, is threatened on multiple fronts, with Rachel blocking out Amy and Sam's protestations that they are too grown up for it all, Sue's unwelcome decision to put Rachel and Paul's names forward for some festive volunteering, and Robin's determination to ensure that Cherry's ex, Ian, doesn't get too close to her on their unable-to-be-cancelled honeymoon.
Series
9	1	"Dad's Old Boat"	Will Sinclair	Tom Basden	2 February 2024	2.13
Sue's desperation to downsize leads to a clear-out, and there's something for everyone; earwax-stricken Paul, in particular, is attracted to a ratty old dinghy he endeavours to take on the water to lift Amy's spirits, for whom England pales in comparison to Norway and sailing amongst its spectacular fjords. Insecure about her age and feeling out of place on her university course, Rachel overcompensates with that traditional student favourite: drinking games. Robin flounders in his attempts to become Cherry's saviour by trying to convince her ex to sign their divorce papers.
10	2	"Granny's Street Fayre"	Will Sinclair	Tom Basden	2 February 2024 (online); 9 February 2024 (broadcast)	N/A
Sue's concerted efforts to embed herself in the community results in her organising the annual street fayre, alongside ensuring she's ensconced in the family home, distracting Rachel from essay procrastinating by her attempts to (re)organise everything. Paul is on the hunt for a rogue dog-walker allowing their mutt to defecate on the driveway, Robin's big plans to sell ice cream at the event is upended by his vehicle choice, Sam is led a merry dance by a girl whose singing is one of the few attractions, and Amy irritates Maya with her decision to sell all her pre-Norway trip junk to passersby.
11	3	"Amy's Valentine's Flowers"	Will Sinclair	Tom Basden	2 February 2024 (online); 16 February 2024 (broadcast)	N/A
Paul's attempts to ingratiate himself with senior colleagues sees him roped into a five-a-side football game; his being confined to the bench welcome, disguising his complete disinterest in the sport. Rachel tries to assuage her guilt over forgetting Valentine's Day by organising a homecooked meal that's actually edible, while suppressing her jealousy over a mysterious romantic card that's arrived for him. Maya gifting Amy a large bunch of flowers sparks suspicions over her motivations, as Robin finds it difficult to propose to Cherry, his plan proving more difficult to deploy than anticipated.
12	4	"Robin's Best Man"	Will Sinclair	Tom Basden	2 February 2024 (online); 23 February 2024 (broadcast)	N/A
Rachel inveigles her way into being Robin's best man, but finds she's bitten off more than she can chew organising a hag do for ten people, almost each with their own specific demand for what and where it should be; the phrase 'off-grid' catches everyone off-guard, especially Rachel... Paul freaks everyone out with his equipment resembling human torsos to practice CPR and the Heimlich manoeuvre outside of job training, while Amy is deeply preoccupied and frustrated by Maya's unwillingness to come out to her parents, as is Sue with her complaints over the composition of Britain's birdlife.
13	5	"Cherry's Wedding Dress"	Will Sinclair	Tom Basden	2 February 2024 (online); 1 March 2024 (broadcast)	N/A
The arrival of Rachel's pretentious sister and her arrogantly aloof husband has everyone's hackles up, with Rachel's clumsy and frenzied attempts to pretend she's aware of what non-immediate family are up to hitting a snag when they all head off to visit a relative they don't know in a care home they can't locate. Sue's gift of £15,000 from her house sale to Paul ends up with Amy's wishes to use it to buy a flat with Maya corrupted into Robin scouring Bulgaria to snap up multiple dilapidated, ex-mining properties on the cheap. Cherry frustrates all with the travails of her wedding dress hunting.
14	6	"Mum's New Tattoo"	Will Sinclair	Tom Basden	2 February 2024 (online); 8 March 2024 (broadcast)	N/A
Amy's new tattoo of Maya's name in Sanskrit inspires Rachel to copy with Paul's, but her low pain threshold impedes her efforts, which act as a distraction from her exam revising, in turn procrastinated by helping Sam bone up for his. Paul's worries about Robin and Cherry's wedding clashing with his police graduation are supplanted by issues caused by his head being too large for the standard issue helmet, while Robin's friend Dean foolishly decides a shotgun deserves to be present at the reception. Sue can't handle moving out of the Jessop household, and has a surprise in store.

=== Series 3 (2025) ===
No. overall	No. in series	Title	Directed by	Written by	Original release date	UK viewers (millions) (Note: Viewership through devices (PCs, phones and tablets) over 28 days post-broadcast, including BBC iPlayer viewership in the 35 days prior to linear broadcast.)
15	1	"Mum and Dad's Anniversary"	Will Sinclair	Tom Basden	25 July 2025	2.39
As an anniversary present, Paul and Rachel are not only in receipt of an incidental double-order of the same barbecue, but the transformation of their home into a 'smart' one. A Bulgarian knock-off of Alexa complements their new smart locks, which end up being anything but after they end up locked in - on their way to an, actually planned, escape room experience. In the meantime, Paul deliberates over the best way to deal with a rash he insists to all and sundry is adjacent to his buttocks, Rachel prepares for a role counselling prisoners by pre-emptively learning self-defence in a way that worsens her composure for anything that such lessons would ready her for, and Amy becomes fixated on the one piece missing from her Lego Eiffel Tower.
16	2	"Mum's Bad Tooth"	Will Sinclair	Tom Basden	25 July 2025	N/A (<2.31) (Note: Not reported in the weekly top 50 programmes for four-screen viewer ratings.)
Paul and Rachel's inquisitive nature over who their potential new neighbours are turns to obsession when they realise it's some old acquaintances they were never able to become friends with; and their determination to finally realise that is undermined by Paul's response to the revelation it is not just those at work that consider him boring, and Rachel's insistence that having a pain-inducing tooth checked out is more trouble than it's worth. Sam's search for potential inspiration and content for a short-form horror film for his coursework inadvertently inspires Sue to dip her toes into the genre, and starts a film club with her friend Prudence using some rather underhand DVDs. Robin's attempts to impress all by doing some fundraising via a bungee jump leads to an unexpected surprise for a work-stressed Maya.
17	3	"Robin's LARP Festival"	Will Sinclair	Tom Basden	25 July 2025 (online); 1 August 2025 (broadcast)	2.35
Paul's enthusiasm about being allocated a young, lanky and ostensibly diffident police officer to mentor is soon extinguished when he discovers that he is the recipient of, not the one delivering, the mentorship. Robin's intentions to spend the weekend at a LARPing festival do not impress a heavy-pregnant Cherry, but compels the entire family to join him when Paul learns his mentor - whom he is desperate to impress - is part of the, incredibly method, group; a prospect especially attractive to Rachel, whose obnoxious fixation on ensuring Sam stays safe on his Duke of Edinburgh expedition is further fuelled by the discovery both events are taking place in the same local woods. Sue's determination to open a stubborn jar of Bulgarian gherkins sees her meet some interesting characters.
18	4	"Our Trip to Liverpool"	Will Sinclair	Story by : Tom Basden; Teleplay by : Ben Ashenden & Alexander Owen	25 July 2025 (online); 8 August 2025 (broadcast)	2.29
The spectre of modern confidence tricksters haunts the Jessops, with Paul - fuelled by his umbrage at falling victim to misleading green bin sizes - convincing the rest of the family of malevolent motives behind recent happenings in their lives... most pivotally Rachel, who is informed selling her sewing machine on eBay without an upfront payment is mightily suspicious. Sue is shocked by news a relative back home in Liverpool has passed away, and enthusiasm for a prospective trip there to sort out their estate only found via the revelation they could pay Rachel's supposed scammers a trip on the way. Meanwhile, Amy becomes obnoxiously conceited after a sudden scouting by a modelling agency, which inspires Robin and Cherry to explore whether newborn Atlas has similar talents.
19	5	"Granny's Uno Hustle"	Will Sinclair	Tom Basden	25 July 2025 (online); 15 August 2025 (broadcast)	2.14
Addiction and relationship trouble course through the Jessops, with Paul's attempts to convince Sue away from the tantalising prospect of winning a few quid down the bingo hall instead directing her into the eccentric, conspiratorial clutches of an infamous wizened UNO grandmaster - and the family all band together in a bold attempt to recoup her losses. Amy and Maya's lifestyles continue to diverge, to the point that Rachel foolishly feels she has trained enough as a counsellor to try and rescue their relationship from falling apart - again. Meanwhile, friction sparks between Robin and Cherry when she dangles the prospect of another visit to her vituperatively biased couples' therapy friend in light of him restarting football sticker collecting, and due to just how desperate the inclinations see him act.
20	6	"Dad's Red Cap"	Will Sinclair	Tom Basden	25 July 2025 (online); 29 August 2025 (broadcast)	N/A (<2.36)
The family take a trip to Malta to visit Rachel and Robin's father, Michael, where Rachel has decided that, in order to fully realise her potential as a counsellor, she must talk through his various flaws and failures as a parent during their childhoods. The prospect is not helped by Michael's disinterested attitude in anything bar himself (or anything he can mock), who instead leads Rachel to wonder if she is as detached in her children's lives - particularly a dejected Amy, pondering a move to the island to get out of her rut back home - before the insistence of both otherwise genuinely risks that of Atlas. Paul refuses to give up in convincing others of the merits of visiting the island's historic monuments, while Robin discovers going scuba-diving without the appropriate training is not worth the risk.
21	7	"Amy’s Big Gig"	Will Sinclair	Tom Basden	25 July 2025 (online); 5 September 2025 (broadcast)	N/A (<2.33)
Paul's excitement at being asked to be Atlas' godfather is quickly tempered by the priest's insistence of the godparents being christened too; his determination to (belatedly) achieve this, alongside Rachel's efforts at keeping up with Dean's league-incompatible girlfriend Katie at her core-centred exercise for the middle-aged, results in more harm than good - and the outcome an obnoxiously burdensome spectacle. Amy is riven with nerves about an upcoming contest her band is competing in, worsened by her arrogant bandmate G(raham)'s suggestion that having Sue attend their gigs isn't conducive to attracting the type of audience they'd prefer.
Special
22	–	"Our New Year's Fireworks Fantasaganza"	Will Sinclair	Tom Basden	31 December 2025	N/A
Rachel's ambitious plans to hold a New Year party like those of old - together with Paul's determination to finally please his family after years of unimpressive fireworks displays - get corrupted; on Robin's suggestion, the family AirBNBs their own home in order to fund a New Year's Eve getaway to somewhere startlingly alike in suburban quality, with Paul's persistent boil necessitating the prerequisite of a sauna to quell it for good - which renders itself available in an unconventional method. Sue finds herself new friends in a slimmers' club whose activities seem directly antithetical to the group's aims, while Sam discovers the complexity of relationships after a mix-up results in an offensive gift to his new girlfriend.

=== Series 4 (2026) ===
A fourth series was commissioned in October 2025.

== Production ==
=== Pandemonium ===
The show's pilot, Pandemonium, was confirmed as part of the announcement of the BBC's 2020 Christmas slate of programming in November 2020, having been commissioned earlier that autumn.

The pilot was shot over six days, and involved finding crew that were experienced in dealing with COVID precautions, which producer Tom Jordan admitted was initially difficult due to the amount of productions that were restarting at the time of filming; he said that a crew "who had worked on COVID-safe sets before was very helpful indeed as the masks and social distancing was second nature to them". Cast and crew were subject to a 'coloured band system', with different colour bands assigned to different members to ascribe how stringent COVID testing and precautions they should be subjected to. Cast and crew "wore masks at all times" and had their temperatures checked each day by COVID supervisors.

The show being filmed from the perspective of the Jessops' teenage son, Sam, and his handheld camera, meant that the scene at the end of the pilot involving the crashing of the family's car off a cliff onto the beach below would only have one take available, and "required incredibly detailed planning for weeks before". Director Ella Jones said this way of filming was something the crew "wanted to embrace", but had to balance the "home-video look" with ensuring it worked well with "comedic timing", and the expectations of the "broad BBC1 audience" meaning the show needed to be "both distinctive but also accessible". This meant "second camera perspective[s]" were added into the narrative at some points that were not as restrictive to what the audience saw, with the aim overall for "choreographed chaos" to "create something that felt amateur and spontaneous, thus enabling our audience to believe the home video conceit but not be distracted by it".

=== Here We Go ===
The pilot's commission to series was announced in November 2021. Basden explained that the premise of the series was inspired by his grandfather filming their family holidays as a child, and the "videos were often very funny by accident", and that he "liked the idea of a family talking to the camera and being aware that they were being filmed as it puts them under even more pressure to project positivity while everything is going wrong around them". He said that he had "wanted to write a sitcom about a family going on holiday for some time, as I think there's something really funny and high stakes about people under pressure to have a good time together, and the stress and anger this tends to produce instead".

The show's production team won an award at the Broadcast Tech Innovation Awards in 2022, with the Excellence in Audio Post-Production (Scripted) being awarded to Joe Cochrane and Elliot Bowell of Splice, who did post-production for Here We Go.

The second series was due to air in late 2023 but was pushed to early 2024. The third series was made available on BBC iPlayer on the morning of 25 July 2025, prior to the broadcast of the series starting later that day. The series was filmed from late October 2024. Filming on the fourth series was underway as of early July 2026.

=== U.S. version ===
In February, 2026, BBC Studios announced the development of a U.S. version in conjunction with Universal Television and Amy Poehler's production company Paper Kite.

== Reception ==
=== Viewership ===
The first series averaged 1.4 million viewers on the night of broadcast, rising to 1.7 million with on-demand viewership.

The third series saw viewership on iPlayer increase by 70% compared to the second series, and viewership among 16-34 year-olds double.

=== Critical reception ===
Flora Carr reviewing on behalf of the Radio Times called the pilot episode "a lockdown comedy special with gallows humour" and gave it three stars out of five, while Ed Cumming for The Independent called it "a valiant effort at exploring our current predicament" and gave it four out of five stars.

Rachel Sigee, reviewing the first full series for the i gave series four out of five stars, stating that "there's great charm to its characters and their eccentricities" but having the sitcom supposedly filmed by the son "feels like a meta-complication it doesn’t need". Benji Wilson for The Daily Telegraph rated the series five stars out of five and as "an instant stone-cold comedy classic".

Broadcast's Miriam McHugh said the show was "a criminally underrated gem" that "didn't get the credit due when it was released, but is an entertaining entrant to the mockumentary canon".
