= Freya Parks =

English actress

- Occupation: Actress
- Years active: 2009—
- Television: Here We Go

Freya Parks is a British stage, television and film actress.

== Career ==
As a child actress, Parks portrayed Etty Darwin in the 2009 film Creation alongside Paul Bettany and Jennifer Connolly. She played Helen Burns in the Cary Joji Fukunaga 2011 adaptation of Jane Eyre, and appeared in Tom Hooper's 2012 musical adaptation of Les Misérables. She starred in Amazon Prime Video's Bliss! in 2016.

In 2018, she was part of the touring stage production of Tristan Bernays and Dougal Irvine's musical Teddy.

Parks had a main role as Amy Jessop in 2020 comedy pilot Pandemonium developed by Tom Basden in which she starred alongside Katherine Parkinson and Jim Howick, which developed into BBC One comedy series Here We Go. A second series was filmed in 2023, and broadcast in 2024. A third season was broadcast in 2025, as well as a New Year’s Special for 2026, and a fourth season has been green lit for broadcast later in the year.

In 2022, she played Hester, the leader of the School for Evil's coven, in the Paul Feig film The School for Good and Evil. In 2024, she played Fiona in Steven Knight's BBC One six-part series This Town.

== Filmography ==
=== Film ===
Year	Title	Role	Notes
2009	Creation	Etty Darwin	
2011	Jane Eyre	Helen Burns	
2012	Les Misérables	Café Barmaid	
2016	Bliss!	Tasha Robson	
2021	School's Out Forever	Claire Baker	
2021	Love Gets a Room	Niusia	
2022	The School for Good and Evil	Hester	
2026	Snapshot	Clara	

=== Television ===
Year	Title	Role	Notes
2012	The Life and Adventures of Nick Nickleby	Mariah Crummles	Mini-series; episodes 2 & 5
2020 – present	Here We Go	Amy Jessop	Series 1, 2 & 3; 20 episodes
2024	This Town	Fiona	5 episodes
2024	Grace	Logan Somerville	Series 4; episode 3: "You Are Dead"
2025	Vera	Stella Marsh	Series 14; episode 2: "The Dark Wives"
