= Bella Ramsey =

English actor (born 2003)

- Ramsey in 2026
- Born: Isabella May Ramsey; 25 September 2003 (age 23); Nottingham, England
- Occupation: Actor
- Years active: 2016–present
- Bella Ramsey's voice Recorded April 2024

Isabella May Ramsey (/ˈræmˌziː/ RAM-zee; born 25 September 2003) is an English actor. They (Note: Ramsey is non-binary and uses they/them pronouns.) are known for their breakthrough roles as young noblewoman Lyanna Mormont in the fantasy television series Game of Thrones (2016–2019) and as Ellie in the post-apocalyptic drama series The Last of Us (2023–present). For the latter, they received nominations for a BAFTA Television Award, two Critics' Choice Awards, two Golden Globe Awards, two Primetime Emmy Awards, and a Screen Actors Guild Award. Ramsey was featured on the Time 100 Next list of rising stars in 2023 and on the Forbes 30 Under 30 Europe list in 2024.

Ramsey played Mildred Hubble in the television series The Worst Witch (2017–2020), for which they won a BAFTA in the Young Performer category, voiced the title role in the animated series Hilda (2018–2023) and starred in the historical comedy film Catherine Called Birdy (2022), for which they were nominated for the Critics' Choice Award for Best Young Performer. Ramsey's portrayal of Kelsey Morgan in the prison drama Time (2023) earned them the Royal Television Society Award for Female Supporting Actor. Ramsey played Ivy in the coming-of-age film Sunny Dancer (2026), Ella in the psychological drama The Liberation (2026), and voiced Zora in the mystery comedy film The Sheep Detectives (2026).

== Early life ==
Isabella May Ramsey was born in Nottingham, England, on 25 September 2003. Ramsey has kept details of their family private but has said they have an older sister and that "my whole family is very musical and creative". Ramsey was raised in Leicestershire and began their education there. They moved to the online school King's InterHigh at age 12, saying that mainstream secondary school was not conducive to their happiness, especially because of their neurodivergence. The flexible online programme allowed Ramsey to balance their studies with acting.

Growing up, Ramsey enjoyed art, music, writing and football, and performed with local amateur theatre groups, including Stagecoach in Loughborough. At age 10, Ramsey joined the Television Workshop in Nottingham, which provided training and support for early auditions, including Game of Thrones. Ramsey continued to attend the Workshop into adulthood and credits it with shaping their approach to acting: "[it] teaches you to be and become. No pretending." Reflecting on their career, Ramsey said, "I never really set out to be [an actor] and then it sort of happened. I wouldn't have it any other way."

== Career ==
=== 2016–2022: Early work ===
Ramsey made their professional debut at age 11 as young noblewoman Lyanna Mormont in the HBO fantasy drama series Game of Thrones (2016–2019). Ramsey later said that the set "felt very natural" and immediately like a place where they belonged. After their debut in the sixth-season episode "The Broken Man", critics and viewers praised Ramsey's portrayal of a no-nonsense leader at such a young age. Co-showrunner D. B. Weiss said that Lyanna was originally intended to appear in only one scene, but Ramsey's performance led the production team to expand the character into a recurring supporting role. Following their appearance in the season finale, The Hollywood Reporter described Ramsey as the sixth season's breakout star. Ramsey continued in the role for the show's seventh and eighth seasons.

While appearing on Game of Thrones, Ramsey also took on their first leading television role as Mildred Hubble in the CBBC fantasy drama series The Worst Witch (2017–2019). For their performance, Ramsey won a BAFTA in the Young Performer category. During filming of the first series, Ramsey developed anorexia nervosa, partly due to the anxiety of spending long periods away from home while still young. They also struggled with emetophobia. Although they had largely recovered from anorexia by the third series, Ramsey decided not to return and the role was recast with Lydia Page for the fourth and final series.

During breaks from filming Game of Thrones and The Worst Witch, Ramsey took on supporting roles in several short and feature-length films, including the psychological drama Two for Joy (2018), the comedy Holmes & Watson (2018), and the biographical drama Judy (2019). Ramsey also expanded into voice acting with their portrayal of the title character in the Netflix animated series Hilda (2018–2023) and television film Hilda and the Mountain King (2021). The series won three Daytime Emmy Awards, and Ramsey earned nominations for Best Voice Performance at the British Animation Awards in 2020 and 2022. Ramsey also contributed musically by writing and performing the song "The Life of Hilda" for the show's second series.

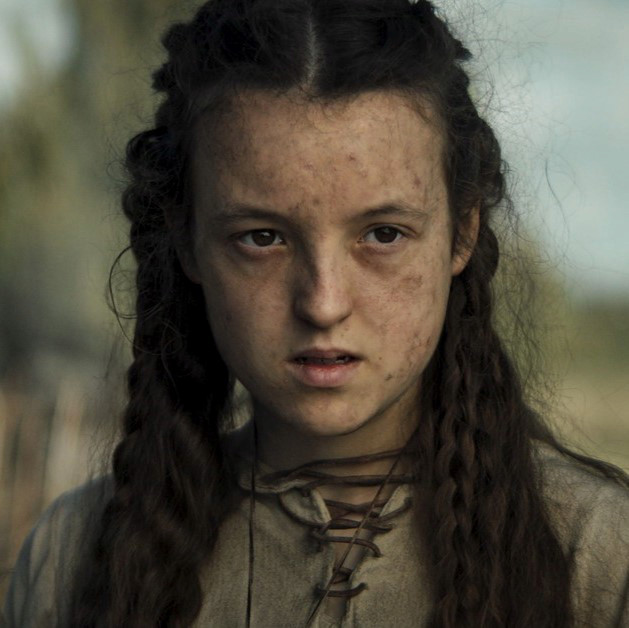
Ramsey in a film still from Villain (2020)

Ramsey next played the orphan Elsbeth in the biographical drama Resistance (2020), which depicts how Marcel Marceau helped Jewish children escape Nazi persecution during World War II. Ramsey was drawn to the film because "the script didn't shy away from the reality of war" in telling what they viewed as an important story. Although the film received mixed reviews, TheWrap's Michael Nordine praised Ramsey's performance as "expressive" and "affecting" and wrote that "great things can be expected of the teenage thespian in the future". Later that year, Ramsey appeared in the second series of the HBO fantasy drama His Dark Materials (2020). Casting director Kahleen Crawford recalled that Ramsey and co-star Ella Schrey-Yeats's performances as Angelica and Paola, respectively, led to the roles being expanded to provide additional screen time.

Between larger projects, Ramsey continued to work in short films, including 3 Minutes of Silence (2020), the horror-drama Requiem (2021), in which they appeared alongside fellow Television Workshop alumni Safia Oakley-Green, and Villain (2023). Ramsey's next television role was Lady Jane Grey in the Starz historical drama Becoming Elizabeth (2022), which chronicles the early years of Elizabeth I. Megan O'Keefe of Decider described Ramsey as the "scene-stealer of the cast", while Kristen Lopez of IndieWire opined that Ramsey's portrayal of Grey was "perfectly played". Although the show received positive reviews, it was cancelled after the first season due to low ratings.

Ramsey starred in their first leading film role as Lady Catherine in Catherine Called Birdy (2022), a medieval coming-of-age comedy written and directed by Lena Dunham and adapted from the novel by Karen Cushman. The film received positive reviews; critic Mark Kermode described Ramsey as a "thrilling screen presence", while Rolling Stone's David Fear felt that Birdy was "played remarkably and brilliantly by [Ramsey] ... who seems to be a gift from the casting gods". For their performance, Ramsey received a nomination for the Critics' Choice Award for Best Young Performer. They also wrote and performed "Birdy Song" for the film's soundtrack.

=== 2023–present: International recognition ===
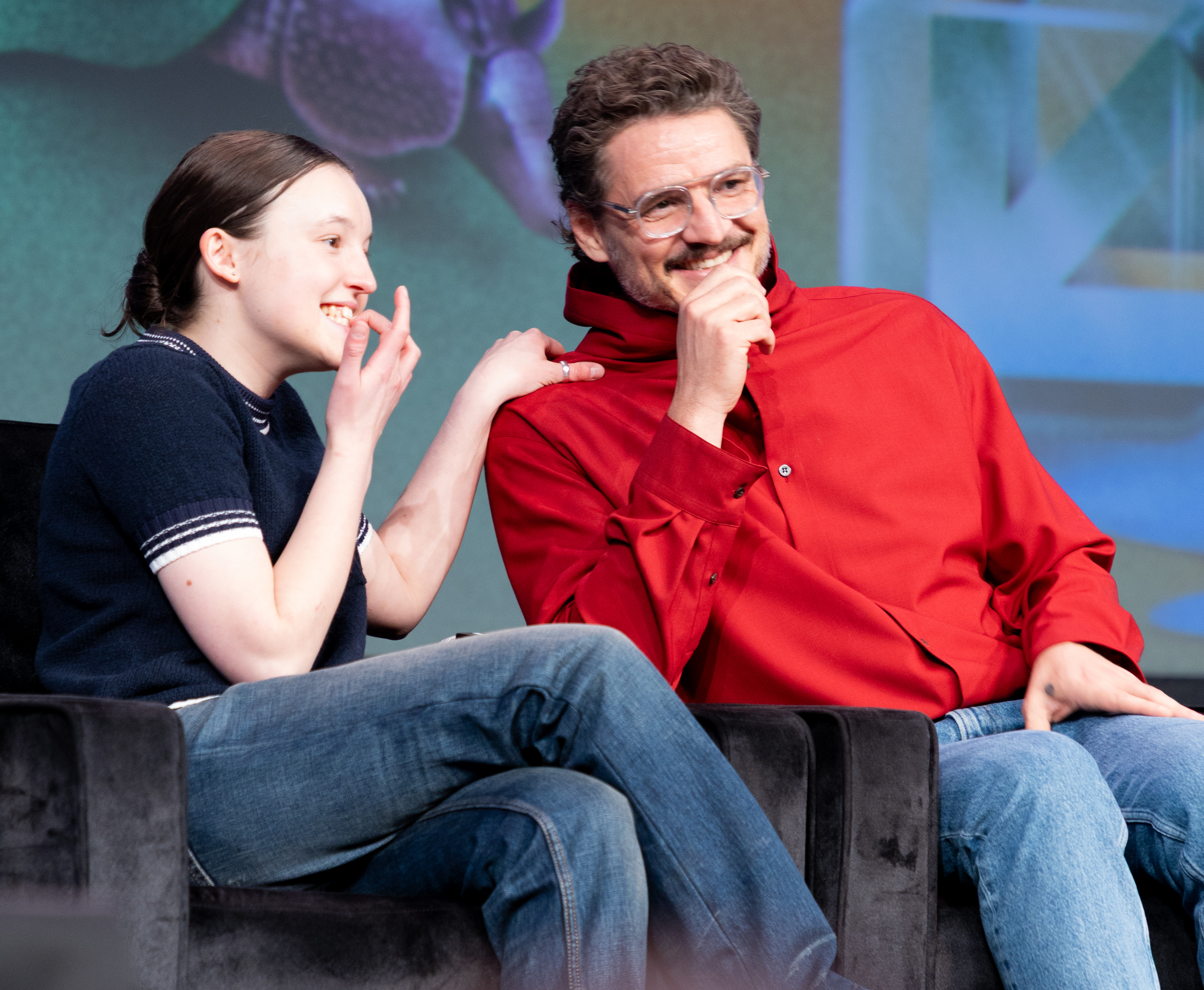
Critics praised the chemistry between Ramsey and Pedro Pascal as Ellie and Joel in The Last of Us.

Ramsey experienced a career breakthrough with their portrayal of Ellie in HBO's post-apocalyptic drama series The Last of Us (2023–present). During filming of the first season of the show, Ramsey and co-star Pedro Pascal (who portrayed Joel) developed a close friendship. Pascal described Ramsey as "his blessing" and said the two were "linked souls". Critics praised the chemistry between Ramsey and Pascal as well as their individual performances. Ramsey received several major award nominations, including for a Primetime Emmy Award, Golden Globe Award, Critics' Choice Award, and Screen Actors Guild Award. At the time of nomination, they were also the youngest ever leading actress nominee for a British Academy (BAFTA) Television Award. For their role, Ramsey was selected for the 2023 BAFTA Breakthrough programme. Ramsey was also included on the Forbes 30 Under 30 Europe list for 2024.

The second season of The Last of Us was released in April 2025. With Pascal taking on a reduced role, Ramsey spent much of the season without him and said the experience was "more challenging" and "felt like more weight". Critics praised Ramsey's performance, writing that they shouldered the season's demands and conveyed Ellie's development into young adulthood with depth and nuance. Ramsey was again nominated for a Golden Globe Award, a Critics' Choice Award and a Primetime Emmy Award, becoming the youngest two-time Emmy lead drama actress nominee. Media coverage of the season included reports of online harassment directed at Ramsey over their appearance, performance and gender identity, and identified Reddit communities dedicated to criticism and memes about their looks. Journalists situated this as part of a broader trend in young, female-presenting actors being targeted for their roles, such as Halle Bailey for The Little Mermaid (2023) and Rachel Zegler for Snow White (2025). Ramsey's acoustic rendition of A-ha's "Take on Me" in the episode "Day One" was included on the soundtrack album.

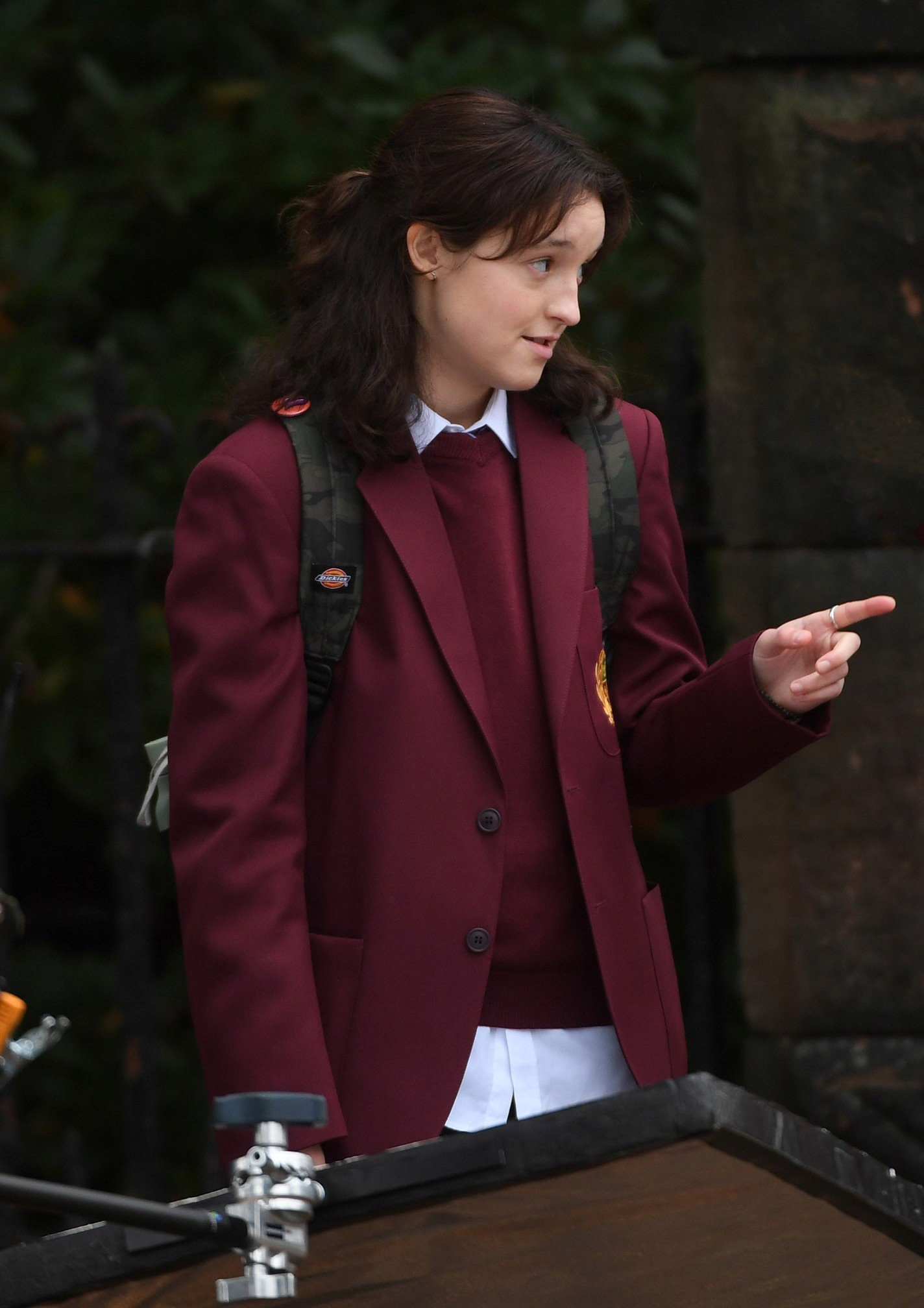
Ramsey on the set of Maya in 2025

After the success of The Last of Us, Ramsey portrayed Kelsey Morgan, a pregnant heroin addict, in the second series of the BBC prison drama Time (2023). It was the first role Ramsey was offered without an audition and they found it challenging, saying that while earlier roles "came from inside of me, [Kelsey] felt more external". The series received positive reviews, with critics praising Ramsey's "confident" and "transfixing" performance. The role earned them the Royal Television Society Award for Female Supporting Actor. In the same year, Ramsey returned to voice acting as the young, rebellious Molly in the animated comedy Chicken Run: Dawn of the Nugget (2023). The film received favourable reviews, with The Independent's Clarisse Loughrey praising Ramsey's "joyous, buoyant performance", and Jacob Oller of Paste Magazine complimenting them as "the clear star, putting an extra level of fear, awe or disillusionment into [their] few lines". Ramsey also voiced the artificial intelligence system nTrac in the low-budget sci-fi film The Correction Unit (2025), which was filmed in Nottingham and featured emerging actors from the area.

During the press tour for the second season of The Last of Us, Ramsey hinted that they had been working on producing music. In October 2025, singer-songwriter Matt Maltese confirmed that he had been collaborating with Ramsey, under Ramsey's musical alter ego Bello, for about a year. On 3 October 2025, the pair released a new version of the song "Cure for Emptiness", which first appeared on Maltese's album Hers (2025).

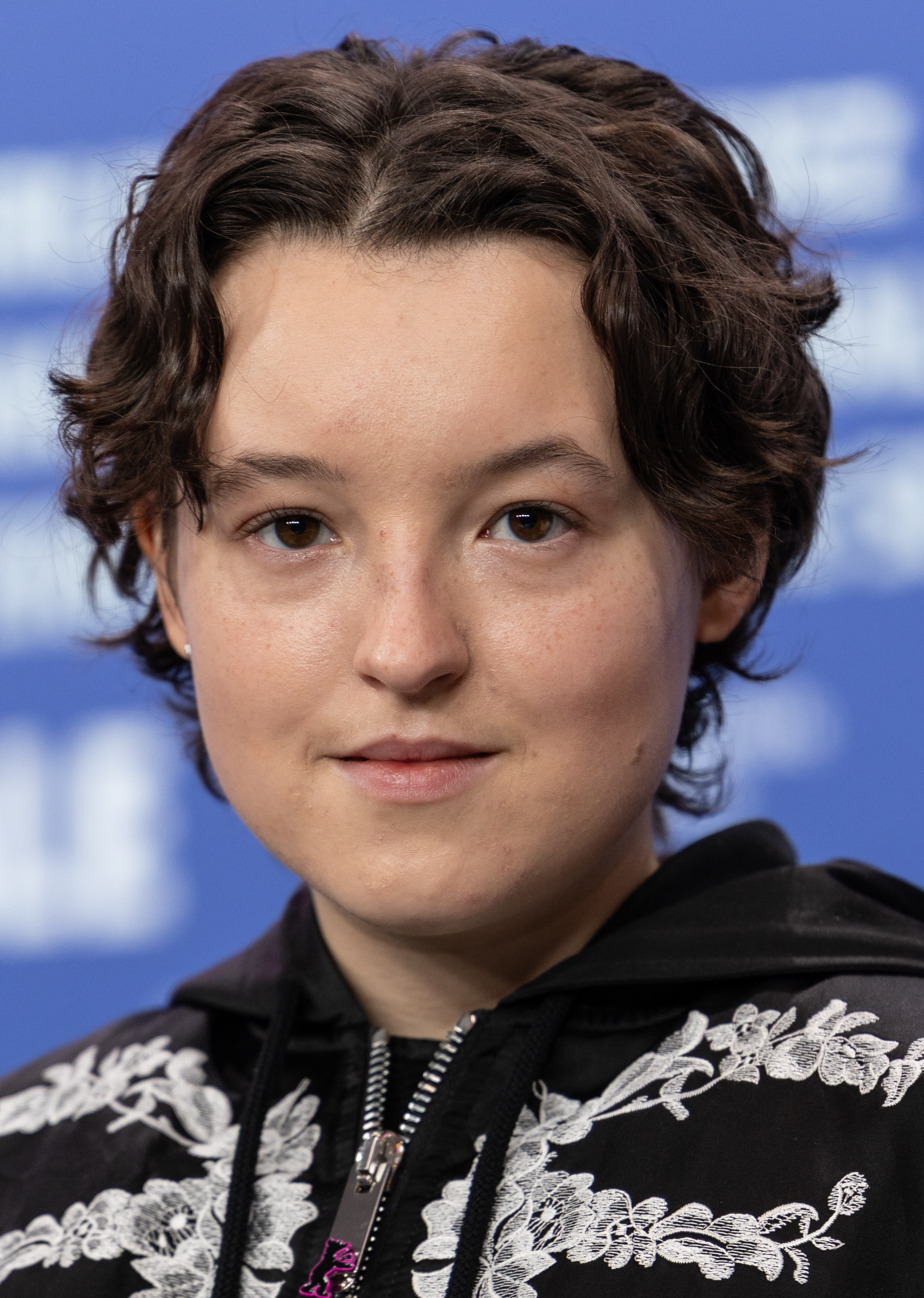
Ramsey in 2026

Ramsey's first project in 2026 was Sunny Dancer, a coming-of-age film in which they played Ivy, a 17-year-old cancer survivor sent to a therapeutic "chemo camp". The film had its world premiere at the Berlin International Film Festival. Ramsey said that, initially, they had been wary that the concept of a camp for kids with cancer was "a recipe for disaster", but found that the film subverted their expectations. They described the shoot as "the best weeks of [their] life so far" and credited it with rekindling their enthusiasm for independent cinema. Critics praised Ramsey’s performance; writing in The Times Laruskha Ivan-Zadeh wrote that they delivered a standout turn, while IndieWire’s Christian Zilko felt that Ramsey was superb at letting the character arc of Ivy emerge naturally. Ramsey next played a supporting role as the voice of Zora, a sheep in the mystery comedy film The Sheep Detectives (2026), about a flock investigating the death of their shepherd, George, played by Hugh Jackman. The film received generally positive reviews.

Later in 2026, they appeared as Ella Cooper in Guy Nattiv’s psychological drama The Liberation, which had its world premiere at the Telluride Film Festival. Set in the 1980s, the film follows Rita Cooper (Carrie Coon), a Holocaust survivor and banker who leaves her family to join an all-female new-age commune. Ramsey and Odessa Young play her daughters, who attempt to bring her home but become drawn into the group themselves. While the critical response centred on Coon’s performance, it also praised Ramsey’s portrayal. Angie Han of The Hollywood Reporter felt that they delivered a “powerhouse performance”, while Pete Hammond of Deadline wrote that they “ignite the screen like nobody’s business” and “again show why [they are] one of the best of [their] generation”. A wide theatrical release is planned for January 2027. Outside of acting, Ramsey was a contestant on the second series of The Celebrity Traitors in October 2026. They were selected as a faithful and were eventually murdered by the traitors in episode four.

Ramsey is set to play the title character in Channel 4's drama series Maya (2026), and will participate in a reading of Charles Dickens’s A Christmas Carol at the Lyric Theatre, London in December 2026 in aid of the homelessness charity Crisis. They will also reprise their role as Ellie in the third season of The Last of Us, which is planned for release in 2027.

== Personal life ==
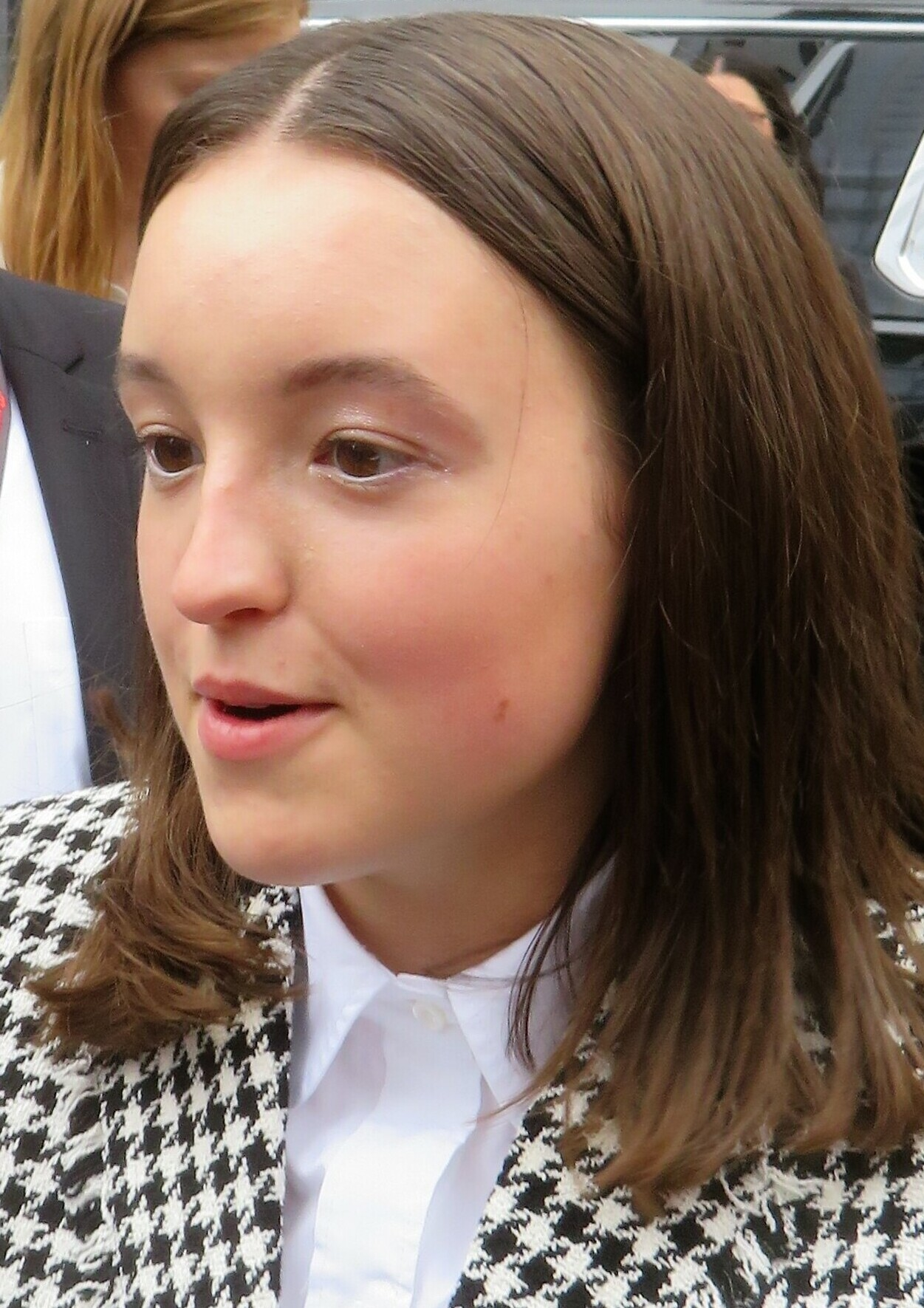
Ramsey in 2022

Ramsey is Christian and has said that their faith helped in their recovery from anorexia nervosa. In 2020, they ran a YouTube channel and related Instagram account called United Hope, where they shared devotional reflections and worship music. By 2023, Ramsey said that their relationship with faith was "a lot quieter" though it remained "a fundamental part of [their] life".

Ramsey lives alone in their own flat, which they bought at the age of 22; they felt "embarrassed" by their young ownership, attributing it to being "in this industry, that pays people too much money". They are a vegetarian, self-described as "vegan-ish"; having been raised as pescatarian, they were vegan for a number of years. They occasionally eat free-range eggs, as an allergy restricts their use of pea-based protein products, which are common in vegan diets.

Ramsey was diagnosed as autistic while filming the first season of The Last of Us. They described the diagnosis as "freeing" as it allowed them to show "more grace" towards themselves about not being able to manage "the easy everyday tasks that everyone else seems to be able to do". Ramsey has said that they "wouldn't be an actor if it wasn't for [their autism]", citing their heightened sensitivity to "micro-expressions and social cues" and what they call "insane levels of visual perception".

=== Gender and sexuality ===
Ramsey is non-binary. They have said that they/them pronouns are "the most accurate" and are "the most truthful thing for me", including with family members, but they are largely indifferent, remarking "call me how you see me". Ramsey considered withdrawing from Emmy consideration due to the lack of non-gendered categories but decided to contend for Lead Actress after discussions with The Last of Us co-creator Craig Mazin. In May 2025, Ramsey described gendered categories as a "really complicated" issue, but: "[to preserve] recognition for women in the industry, ... I think it is important that we have a female category." Ramsey's first Emmy nomination was the first leading role nomination for an openly non-binary actor. (Note: Emma Corrin was nominated for Lead Actress in 2021 but did not publicly identify as non-binary at the time. Carl Clemons-Hopkins was the first openly non-binary acting nominee, nominated for Supporting Actor in a Comedy Series in 2021.) In 2025, Ramsey became the first openly non-binary person to receive a wax figure at Madame Tussauds in London.

Regarding their sexuality, Ramsey said they are "not 100 per cent straight. I'm a little bit wavy". While Ramsey has found labels helpful in some areas of life, they have said that "gender and sexuality-wise, labels do not feel comfy for me in any capacity." In September 2023, Ramsey was included in Time magazine's Time 100 Next list of rising stars. In an accompanying tribute, actor Emma D'Arcy praised their acting skills and called them "an inspiring figure in the LGBTQIA+ community".

=== Advocacy ===
Ramsey is a patron of Bamboozle Theatre, a Leicester-based company offering creative experiences for learning-disabled and autistic young people. They support the organisation's artistic and fundraising work, endorsing Eye of the Storm, a 2024 novel by Amy Mayo, and promoting a Crowdfunder campaign for Traces, an outdoor production designed for autistic audiences.

Ramsey has used their platform to support the Palestinian cause. They signed a Queer Artists for Palestine letter calling for a ceasefire in Gaza and pledging to "stand firmly with [Palestinians] in their call for dignity and self-determination".

In response to the April 2025 UK Supreme Court ruling in For Women Scotland Ltd v The Scottish Ministers, Ramsey was one of over 400 film and television professionals to sign an open letter pledging "solidarity'' with the trans, non-binary and intersex communities and condemning both actions.

Ramsey has also advocated for environmental protection. In 2019, they were appointed a Greenpeace Oceans Ambassador, promoting awareness of ocean conservation and sustainability. As part of this role, Ramsey contributed voice work to Turtle Journey (2020), a short animated film produced by Greenpeace and Aardman Animations. In 2024, Ramsey joined other public figures in signing an open letter opposing Shell's legal action against Greenpeace, describing the lawsuit as an attempt to suppress environmental activism. Ramsey advocated for a green rider for the second season of The Last of Us, which led the production to adopt environmentally friendly practices, including using electric vehicles and reducing waste.

== Filmography ==
†	Denotes productions that have not yet been released

=== Film ===
Year	Title	Role	Notes	Ref.
2017	Elefthería	Ellie	Short film	
2018	Two for Joy	Miranda		
2018	Holmes & Watson	Flotsam		
2019	Princess Emmy	Princess Gizana (voice)		
2019	Judy	Lorna Luft		
2019	Nancy	Nancy	Short film	
2019	Zero	Alice	Short film	
2019	On the Beaches	Kitty	Short film	
2020	Turtle Journey	Daughter Turtle (voice)	Short film	
2020	3 Minutes of Silence	Jane	Short film	
2020	Resistance	Elsbeth		
2021	Requiem	Evelyn	Short film	
2022	Catherine Called Birdy	Birdy		
2023	Chicken Run: Dawn of the Nugget	Molly (voice)		
2023	Villain	Georgia	Short film	
2024	Matilda and the Brave Escape	Narrator (voice)	Short film	
2024	More Flames	Dog (voice)	Short film	
2025	The Correction Unit	nTrac (voice)		
2026	Sunny Dancer	Ivy		
2026	The Sheep Detectives	Zora (voice)		
2026	The Liberation	Ella Cooper		

=== Television ===
Year	Title	Role	Notes	Ref.
2016–2019	Game of Thrones	Lyanna Mormont	Recurring role (seasons 6–8)	
2017–2020	The Worst Witch	Mildred Hubble	Main role (series 1–3); Guest appearance (series 4)	
2018	Requiem	Young Matilda	Episode: "The Blue Room"	
2018–2023	Hilda	Hilda (voice)	Main role; 34 episodes	
2020	Shepherd's Delight	Girl in Park	Episode: "Self-Tape 48"	
2020	His Dark Materials	Angelica	6 episodes (series 2)	
2020	Summer Camp Island	Ramona (age 15; voice)	Episode: "Ghost Baby Jabberwock"	
2021	Hilda and the Mountain King	Hilda (voice)	Main role; television film	
2022	Becoming Elizabeth	Jane Grey	Main role; 6 episodes	
2023	Time	Kelsey Morgan	Main role; 3 episodes (series 2)	
2023–present	The Last of Us	Ellie	Lead role; 16 episodes	
2026	The Celebrity Traitors	Themself	Contestant; Series 2	
2026	Maya †	Maya	Main role	

=== Theatre ===
Year	Title	Role	Playwright	Theatre	Ref.
2026	A Christmas Carol †	TBC	Charles Dickens	Lyric Theatre, West End	

=== Video games ===
Year	Title	Role	Ref.
2018	Doctor Who Infinity	Freya (voice)	
2025	Chicken Run: Eggstraction	Molly (voice)	

=== Radio and podcasts ===
Year	Title	Role	Notes	Ref.
2020	Drama on 4	Miss Edith	Episode: "Edith Sitwell in Scarborough"	
2022	Impact Winter	Whisper	6 episodes	

=== Music videos ===
Year	Title	Artist	Ref.
2025	"Not Like The Rest"	Girlband!	
2025	"Cure for Emptiness"	Duet with Matt Maltese; credited as Bello	

== Discography ==
Year	Title	Album	Notes	Ref.
2020	"The Life of Hilda"	Hilda	Episode: "Chapter 7: The Beast of Cauldron Island"	
2022	"Birdy Song"	Catherine Called Birdy		
2025	"Take On Me"	The Last of Us: Season 2	Episode: "Day One"	
2025	"Cure for Emptiness"	Non-album single	Matt Maltese song; credited as Bello	

== Awards and nominations ==
Year	Award	Category	Work	Result	Ref.
2018	British Academy Children's Awards	Best Young Performer	The Worst Witch	Nominated	
2019	British Academy Children's Awards	Best Young Performer	The Worst Witch	Won	
2020	Screen Actors Guild Awards	Outstanding Performance by an Ensemble in a Drama Series	Game of Thrones	Nominated	
2023	Critics' Choice Awards	Best Young Performer	Catherine Called Birdy	Nominated	
2023	London Critics Circle Film Awards	Young British/Irish Performer of the Year	Catherine Called Birdy	Nominated	
2023	MTV Movie & TV Awards	Breakthrough Performance	The Last of Us	Nominated	
2023	MTV Movie & TV Awards	Best Duo (shared with Pedro Pascal)	The Last of Us	Won	
2023	Dorian Awards	Best TV Performance – Drama	The Last of Us	Nominated	
2023	Television Critics Association Awards	Individual Achievement in Drama	The Last of Us	Nominated	
2023	Astra TV Awards	Best Actress in a Broadcast Network or Cable Series, Drama	The Last of Us	Nominated	
2023	Primetime Emmy Awards	Outstanding Lead Actress in a Drama Series	The Last of Us	Nominated	
2023	Gotham Independent Film Awards	Outstanding Performance in a New Series	The Last of Us	Nominated	
2024	Golden Globe Awards	Best Actress – Television Series Drama	The Last of Us	Nominated	
2024	Critics' Choice Awards	Best Actress in a Drama Series	The Last of Us	Nominated	
2024	Saturn Awards	Best Performance by a Younger Actor on a TV Series	The Last of Us	Nominated	
2024	AACTA International Awards	Best Actress in a Series	The Last of Us	Nominated	
2024	People's Choice Awards	Drama TV Star of the Year	The Last of Us	Nominated	
2024	Screen Actors Guild Awards	Outstanding Performance by an Ensemble in a Drama Series	The Last of Us	Nominated	
2024	Screen Actors Guild Awards	Outstanding Performance by a Female Actor in a Drama Series	The Last of Us	Nominated	
2024	Independent Spirit Awards	Best Lead Performance in a New Scripted Series	The Last of Us	Nominated	
2024	Satellite Awards	Best Actress in a Drama/Genre Series	The Last of Us	Nominated	
2024	Critics' Choice Super Awards	Best Actress in a Horror Series, Limited Series or Made-for-TV Movie	The Last of Us	Won	
2024	Critics' Choice Super Awards	Best Actress in a Superhero Series, Limited Series or Made-for-TV Movie	The Last of Us	Won	
2024	British Academy Television Awards	Best Actress	The Last of Us	Nominated	
2024	Royal Television Society Award	Female Supporting Actor	Time	Won	
2025	Primetime Emmy Awards	Outstanding Lead Actress in a Drama Series	The Last of Us	Nominated	
2025	Critics' Choice Super Awards	Best Actress in a Horror Series, Limited Series or Made-for-TV Movie	The Last of Us	Nominated	
2025	Critics' Choice Super Awards	Best Actress in a Superhero Series, Limited Series or Made-for-TV Movie	The Last of Us	Nominated	
2025	Astra TV Awards	Best Actress in a Drama Series	The Last of Us	Nominated	
2025	Dorian Awards	Best TV Performance – Drama	The Last of Us	Nominated	
2025	Dorian Awards	LGBTQIA+ TV Trailblazer Award	—N/a	Nominated	
2026	Critics' Choice Awards	Best Actress in a Drama Series	The Last of Us	Nominated	
2026	Golden Globe Awards	Best Actress in a Television Series – Drama	The Last of Us	Nominated	
2026	British Independent Film Awards	Best Ensemble Performance	Sunny Dancer	Pending	
