= Kit Young =

English actor (born 1994)

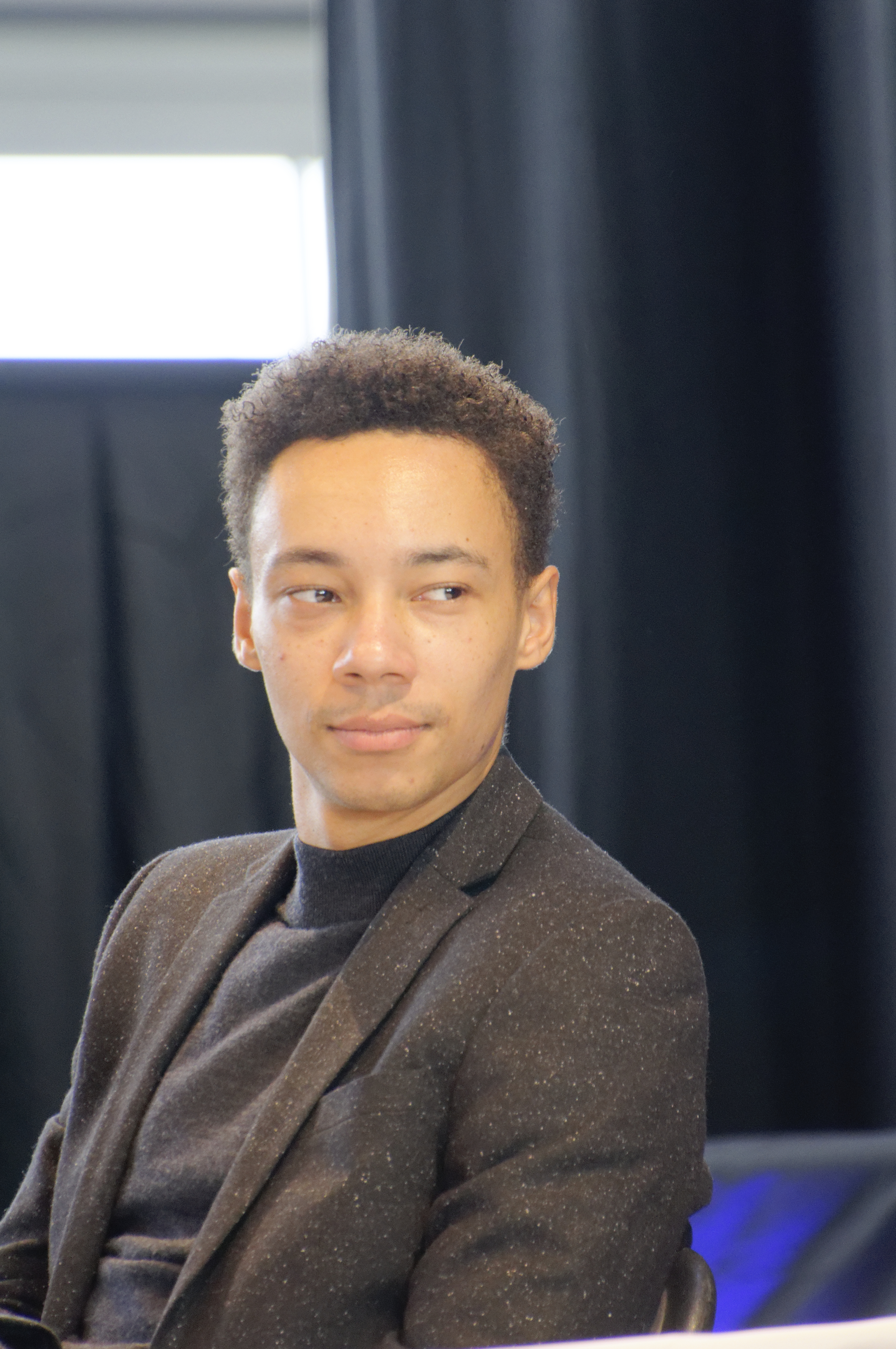
- Young at the 2021 Comic-Con Germany
- Born: Christopher William Young; 1994 (age 31–32); Oxford, England
- Education: RADA (BA)
- Occupation: Actor
- Years active: 2008–present

Christopher William Young (born 1994) is a British actor. He began his career in theatre, earning an Ian Charleson Award nomination. On television, he starred as Jesper Fahey in the Netflix fantasy series Shadow and Bone (2021–2023). He won a Scottish BAFTA for his performance in the horror film Out of Darkness (2022). His other films include The School for Good and Evil (2022).

== Early life and education ==
Young was born in Oxford to a Scottish father and a Ugandan mother and raised in Abingdon-on-Thames. He attended Abingdon School from 2008 to 2013; he was a member of the Abingdon Film Unit and played the lead role in the school's 2012 senior production of Candide.

Young was a member of the National Youth Theatre. He had a few minor and ensemble roles, such as in the television film Walter's War and the Oxford Playhouse productions of Cinderella and Dick Whittington. He went on to train at the Royal Academy of Dramatic Art (RADA), graduating with a Bachelor of Arts in Acting in 2017.

== Career ==
Post graduation from RADA, Young played the lead in The Extraordinary Cabaret of Dorian Gray at the 2017 Underbelly Theatre Festival in South Bank. He also joined the UK tour of The Real Thing as Billy. In 2018, he played Octavius in a production of Julius Caesar at the Bridge Theatre, the Journalist in a production of The Prime of Miss Jean Brodie at Donmar Warehouse, and Malcolm in Macbeth at the Sam Wanamaker Playhouse at the Globe Theatre.

Young made his television debut in 2019 with a guest role in Endeavour. He also appeared in the Dylan Holmes Williams directed short The Devil's Harmony. That spring and summer, he played Lysander in A Midsummer Night's Dream at Bridge Theatre alongside Gwendoline Christie, which earned him an Ian Charleson Award nomination.

In October 2019, it was announced Young would star as Jesper Fahey the 2021 Netflix series Shadow and Bone, an adaptation of fantasy book series The Grisha Trilogy and the Six of Crows Duology by Leigh Bardugo. His performance was singled out by several publications. The series was cancelled by Netflix after two seasons. In 2022, he starred in the horror film The Origin (later Out of Darkness) and appeared in the Netflix film adaptation of The School for Good and Evil.

In 2025 Young starred in the 2025 FX and FX on Hulu series Alien: Earth, and appeared as George Knightley opposite Amelia Kenworthy in Ava Pickett's stage adaptation of Emma at the Rose Theatre, Kingston. His performance as Jack Absolute in The Rivals at the Orange Tree was commended by one reviewer as "a particular joy to watch for his physicality and speed".

== Filmography ==
=== Film ===
Year	Title	Role	Notes
2018	Alex	Alessandro de Medici	Short film
2019	The Devil's Harmony	Tyrone	Short film
2019	A Midsummer Night's Dream	Lysander	National Theatre Live
2022	Out of Darkness	Geirr	
2022	The School for Good and Evil	Rafal / Rhian	Netflix film
2024	The Beautiful Game	Cal	Netflix film

=== Television ===
Year	Title	Role	Notes
2008	Walter's War	Young Edward	Television film
2019	Endeavour	Chris	Episode: "Pylon"
2021–2023	Shadow and Bone	Jesper Fahey	Main role
2025	Alien: Earth	Tootles/Isaac	6 episodes

=== Music videos ===
Song	Year	Artist	Notes
"Confessions in the Pool"	2018	Ash	

== Stage ==
Year	Title	Role	Notes
2013	The Abingdon Passion Play	Jesus	Abbey Gardens, Abingdon-on-Thames
2017	The Extraordinary Cabaret Of Dorian Gray	Dorian Gray	Underbelly Festival, London
2017	The Real Thing	Billy	UK Tour
2018	Julius Caesar	Octavius	Bridge Theatre, London
2018	Winter Blossom Karaoke and Other Snippets		Camden People's Theatre, London
2018	The Prime of Miss Jean Brodie	Journalist	Donmar Warehouse, London
2018	Macbeth	Malcolm	Sam Wanamaker Playhouse, London
2019	A Midsummer Night's Dream	Lysander	Bridge Theatre, London
2023	Influence	The Magician	Collective Theatre, London
2024	All's Well That Ends Well	Bertram	Sam Wanamaker Playhouse, London
2025	Emma	George Knightley	Rose Theatre, Kingston
2025	The Rivals	Jack Absolute	Orange Tree Theatre
2026	Present Laughter	Johannes	UK Tour

== Awards and nominations ==
Year	Award	Category	Work	Result	Ref.
2020	Ian Charleson Awards		A Midsummer Night's Dream	Nominated	
2023	The Offies	Plays: Solo Performance	Influence	Nominated	
2024	British Academy Scotland Awards	Best Actor in Film	Out of Darkness	Won	

== See also ==
- List of Old Abingdonians
