= Catherine Called Birdy (film) =

2022 film by Lena Dunham

- Official release poster
- Directed by: Lena Dunham
- Screenplay by: Lena Dunham
- Based on: Catherine, Called Birdy by Karen Cushman
- Produced by: Eric Fellner; Tim Bevan; Lena Dunham; Jo Wallett
- Starring: Bella Ramsey; Billie Piper; Andrew Scott
- Cinematography: Laurie Rose
- Edited by: Joe Klotz
- Music by: Carter Burwell
- Production companies: Working Title Films; Good Thing Going
- Distributed by: Amazon Studios
- Release dates: September 12, 2022 (TIFF); September 23, 2022 (United States)
- Running time: 108 minutes
- Countries: United Kingdom; United States
- Language: English

Catherine Called Birdy is a 2022 medieval comedy film written for the screen, co-produced, and directed by Lena Dunham. It is based on the 1994 novel of the same name by Karen Cushman. It stars Bella Ramsey as the title character, alongside Billie Piper and Andrew Scott.

Catherine Called Birdy had its premiere at the Toronto International Film Festival on September 12, 2022. It received a limited release on September 23 by Amazon Studios, prior to streaming on Prime Video on October 7, 2022.

== Plot ==
Catherine, known as Birdy, is a fourteen-year-old English girl living in 13th-century Lincolnshire, England, with her father, Lord Rollo, mother, Lady Aislinn, and seventeen-year-old brother Robert. Her other brother, Edward, is a monk at a nearby monastery. The headstrong and rambunctious Birdy is attended by her nurse, Morwenna, and is friends with a peasant boy named Perkin who often joins in her antics. The indulgent Rollo is informed that the family finances are in terrible shape and that he can solve them by marrying Birdy to a wealthy suitor. When Birdy starts her first period, Morwenna shows her how to deal with it and Rollo begins seriously looking for suitors. Aislinn gives birth to a stillborn child, the latest of several such tragedies.

Unwilling to grow up and lose her freedom, Birdy begins chasing off potential suitors through strange and off-putting antics. Birdy's friend Aelis comes to stay with them. Handsome Uncle George, with whom Birdy is smitten, soon returns from the crusades. Birdy discovers Aelis and George kissing, and breaks off her friendship with Aelis. George breaks Aelis' and Birdy's hearts by marrying Ethelfritha, a wealthy widow. Rollo announces that Aislinn is pregnant again, much to the anger of Birdy, who fears that her mother will die in childbirth.

A new suitor, Sir Henry Murgaw, arrives, and Birdy dubs him Shaggy Beard for his unkempt appearance. Birdy attempts to scare away the much older man, but Shaggy Beard finds her antics alluring. Saying that he "enjoys the chase," he gives Birdy a purse full of money, saying that she should spend it when she agrees to marry him. Aelis' father marries her off to a nine year old boy, but her new husband soon dies. This pleases Robert, who is secretly in love with Aelis and plans to ask her to marry him. Aelis' father demands a higher bride price than Robert can afford. Birdy decides to give Shaggy Beard's money to Robert so he can marry Aelis.

Birdy runs off to Uncle George's. There she learns that her romantic notions of George's adventures are false. Ethelfritha suggests that the two of them run off and have adventures, but Birdy realizes that if she does so she will miss her family and friends. Resolved to marry for the sake of the family, Birdy returns home to find her mother in labor. When complications arise, Rollo helps talk Aislinn through the labor and she gives birth to twin daughters called Eleanor and Mary Catherine. The day has finally arrived and Birdy says tearful goodbyes as she prepares to leave with Shaggy Beard. As the carriage trundles away, Rollo intervenes, and says that Birdy will remain with them. Shaggy Beard insists that she marry him and the two men agree to a duel. Despite his poor swordsmanship, Rollo disarms Shaggy Beard, who fakes a back injury in order to remove himself from the duel. The assembled people take Birdy out of the carriage, ending the marriage agreement.

Birdy, who has been keeping a diary of these events, summarizes what she has learned and vows to preserve what freedom she can in her world. As she roughhouses with Perkin, a suitor approaches.

== Cast ==
- Bella Ramsey as Lady Catherine / "Birdy"
- Billie Piper as Lady Aislinn, Catherine's mother
- Andrew Scott as Lord Rollo, Catherine's father
- Lesley Sharp as Morwenna, Catherine's nursemaid
- Joe Alwyn as George, Catherine's uncle and Lady Aislinn’s younger brother
- Sophie Okonedo as Ethelfritha Rose Splinter of Devon, a wealthy widow who marries George
- Paul Kaye as Sir John Henry Murgaw VIII / "Shaggy Beard"
- Dean-Charles Chapman as Robert, Catherine's 17-year-old older brother
- Isis Hainsworth as Aelis, Catherine's best friend
- Archie Renaux as Edward the Monk, Catherine's 21-year-old older brother
- Michael Woolfitt as Perkin, Catherine's goatherd friend
- David Bradley as Lord Gideon Sidebottom, Aelis' father
- Mimi M. Khayisa as Lady Berenice Sidebottom, Aelis' stepmother
- Rita Bernard-Shaw as Meg, Catherine's milkmaid friend
- Ralph Ineson as Golden Tiger, a peasant and driver
- Jamie Demetriou as Etienne, the manservant to Shaggy Beard
- Russell Brand as Suitor from Kent
- Jacob Avery as Fulk the Younger
- Angus Wright as Fulk the Elder

== Production ==
In February 2021, it was announced that Dunham had scripted and would direct a film based on the children's novel Catherine, Called Birdy by Karen Cushman that was "her longtime passion project". At the end of March 2021, it was announced that Billie Piper, Andrew Scott and Bella Ramsey were included in the main cast. On 1 April 2021, it was reported that Joe Alwyn and Dean-Charles Chapman had joined the cast.

Principal photography began on 30 March 2021 in close proximity to Stokesay Castle in Shropshire, England.

Bella Ramsey wrote "Birdy Song" for the film. Ramsey wrote the song when they were 10, channeling the feelings of exclusion when their friends were unkind to them at a sleepover.

== Release ==
The film had its world premiere at the Toronto International Film Festival in September 2022. It was released in a limited release on September 23, 2022, by Amazon Studios, prior to streaming on Prime Video on October 7, 2022.

== Reception ==
On the review aggregator Rotten Tomatoes, 88% of 127 critics' reviews are positive, with an average rating of 7.2/10. The website's consensus reads, "Bringing a beloved book brilliantly to life, Catherine Called Birdy proves a well-told coming-of-age story can feel fresh regardless of the period setting." On Metacritic, the film has a weighted average score of 74 out of 100, based on 34 critics, indicating "generally favorable" reviews.

David Fear with Rolling Stone said the film was "the perfect mix of funny, irreverent and outraged," calling Dunham's adaptation "deliriously fun yet pointed," and lead actor Ramsey "a gift from the casting gods."

Giving the film four out of five stars, Adrian Horton with The Guardian acknowledged that "the midsection drags a bit," but concluded that "in Dunham’s hands, the throughline of enduring and discovering one’s worth, however historically imagined, is at once a comfort and a lark."
