= 2024 British Academy Scotland Awards =

- Date: 17 November 2024
- Site: Glasgow, Scotland
- Hosted by: Edith Bowman

The 2024 British Academy Scotland Awards took place on 17 November 2024 in Glasgow, Scotland. The ceremony was hosted by Edith Bowman.

== Nominations and winners ==
The nominations were announced on 2 October. Winners will be listed first and highlighted in boldface.

Best Actor in Film	Best Actress in Film
**Kit Young – Out of Darkness**; Lorn Macdonald – The Strange Case of Dr Jekyll and Mr Hyde; Stephen McMillan – The Lesson	**Safia Oakley-Green – Out of Darkness**; Shirley Henderson – The Trouble with Jessica; Tilda Swinton – The Eternal Daughter
Best Actor in Television	Best Actress in Television
**David Tennant – There She Goes**; Khalid Abdalla – The Crown; Richard Gadd – Baby Reindeer; Daniel Portman – Black Mirror	**Doon Mackichan – Two Doors Down**; Elaine C. Smith – Two Doors Down; Ashley Storrie – Dinosaur; Nicola Walker – Annika
Best Director (Factual)	Best Director (Fiction)
**Kevin Macdonald – High & Low - John Galliano**; Ella Glendining – Is There Anybody Out There; Matt Pinder – Murder Trial: The Disappearance of Renee and Andre MacRae	**Saul Metzstein – Slow Horses**; Hope Dickson Leach – The Strange Case of Dr Jekyll and Mr Hyde; Niamh McKeown – Dinosaur; Adura Onashile - Girl
Entertainment	Factual Series
**The Agency: Unfiltered**; Burns Night 2024; Richard Osman's House of Games; Susan Calman's Grand Day Out	**Not Your Average Family**; Icons of Football; Scotland - The New Wild
Feature Film	Features
**Girl**; Is There Anybody Out There?; Out of Darkness	**Extraordinary Escapes with Sandi Toksvig**; Location, Location, Location; Secrets of the Supermarket Own-Brands
Short Film & Animation	Single Documentary
**Blackwool**; Care; Friends on the Outside; You Land	**Liar: The Fake Grooming Scandal**; Eilish McColgan: Running in the Family; Strike! The Village That Fought Back
News & Current Affairs	Television Scripted
**Catching A Killer: The Murder of Emma Caldwell (Disclosure)**; HM The Queen: The Journey to London; Less for More: The Truth about Food Prices (Dispatches)	**Float**; Dinosaur; Shetland
Writer Film/Television in partnership with Screen Scotland
**Matilda Curtis, Ashley Storrie - Dinosaur**; Richard Gadd – Baby Reindeer; Nicole Taylor – One Day

=== Outstanding Contribution awards ===
- Outstanding Contribution to Film – Lynda Myles
- Outstanding Contribution to Television – Hazel Irvine
- Outstanding Contribution to Craft – Des Hamilton
