= Dundead =

Horror film festival in Dundee, Scotland

- Location: Dundee, Scotland
- Founded: 2011
- Hosted by: Dundee Contemporary Arts

Dundead is a horror film festival in Dundee, Scotland.

== Background ==
Dundead is Dundee Contemporary Arts' (DCA) annual festival and programme strand that celebrates horror, cult and weird cinema.

The festival brings together a mix of previews and premieres of brand new genre titles as well as specially selected horror classics. It has taken place at DCA on an annual basis since April 2011, with monthly screenings throughout the year and a curated programme in October to celebrate Halloween.

The festival was programmed by Chris O'Neill, head of cinema at the Triskel Arts Centre in Cork, Ireland, from 2011 to 2019.

Since 2020, it has been programmed by Michael Coull, the DCA's cinema programmer.

== Programme ==
=== 2016 ===
The 2016 festival took place from 28 April–1 May 2016, with the programme including four previews and a Wes Craven retrospective.

Year	Title	Director(s)	Notes
2015	Green Room	Jeremy Saulnier	Preview
1977	The Hills Have Eyes	Wes Craven	
2015	Evolution	Lucile Hadžihalilović	Preview
2015	Southbound	Radio Silence, Roxanne Benjamin, David Bruckner, Patrick Horvath	
1984	A Nightmare on Elm Street	Wes Craven	
1981	Time Bandits	Terry Gilliam	
1980	Hawk the Slayer	Terry Marcel	
2015	The Hexecutioners	Jesse Thomas Cook	
2015	Baskin	Can Evrenol	Preview
1996	Scream	Wes Craven	
1983	Krull	Peter Yates	
2015	Queen of Earth	Alex Ross Perry	Preview
1983	The Final Terror	Andrew Davis	
2005	Red Eye	Wes Craven	

=== 2017 ===
The 2017 festival took place from 27–30 April 2017, featuring a mix of previews, new titles and a retrospective of Stephen King classics.

Year	Title	Director(s)	Notes
2016	The Devil's Candy	Sean Byrne	
2007	The Mist	Frank Darabont	
2016	Egomaniac	Kate Shenton	
2016	The Void	Steven Kostanski, Jeremy Gillespie	
1979	Salem's Lot	Tobe Hooper	112-minute theatrical cut
1984	Firestarter	Mark L. Lester	
2016	The Autopsy of Jane Doe	André Øvredal	
2016	The Chamber	Ben Parker	
1982	Creepshow	George A. Romero	
1986	Stand by Me	Rob Reiner	
1980	The Shining	Stanley Kubrick	
2016	The Eyes of My Mother	Nicolas Pesce	
2016	Always Shine	Sophia Takal	
1989	Pet Sematary	Mary Lambert	

=== 2018 ===
The 2018 festival took place from 10–13 May 2018, with a special Tobe Hooper retrospective following his death the previous year.

Year	Title	Director(s)	Notes
2017	The Endless	Justin Benson, Aaron Moorhead	Preview
1974	The Texas Chain Saw Massacre	Tobe Hooper	
2017	The Cured	David Freyne	Preview
2017	M.F.A.	Natalia Leite	Preview
1976	Eaten Alive	Tobe Hooper	
1982	The Dark Crystal	Jim Henson, Frank Oz	
2017	Vampire Clay	Soîchi Umezawa	Preview
1981	The Funhouse	Tobe Hooper	
1932	The Old Dark House	James Whale	
2017	My Friend Dahmer	Marc Meyers	Preview
1985	Lifeforce	Tobe Hooper	

=== 2019 ===
The 2019 festival took place from 2–5 May 2019. A number of films from 1999 were screened to mark the 20th anniversary of the DCA's opening that year.

Year	Title	Director(s)	Notes
2019	Extremely Wicked, Shockingly Evil and Vile	Joe Berlinger	Preview
1999	Ring	Hideo Nakata	
2018	The Dead Center	Billy Senese	Preview
2018	Werewolf	Adrian Panek	Preview
1999	Existenz	David Cronenberg	
2019	Far From the Apple Tree	Grant McPhee	Preview
2018	Knife + Heart	Yann Gonzalez	Preview
1999	The Blair Witch Project	Eduardo Sánchez, Daniel Myrick	
2018	Level 16	Danishka Esterhazy	Preview
2019	The Hole in the Ground	Lee Cronin	
1971	A Clockwork Orange	Stanley Kubrick	
1979	Phantasm	Don Coscarelli	
2019	Those Who Deserve To Die	Bret Wood	World première

=== 2020 ===
Dundead festival did not take place in 2020 a result of the COVID-19 pandemic.

=== 2021 ===
A scaled-down programme of events took place in 2021 under the title Dundead Summer Camp, This took place from 9 to 11 July 2021.

Year	Title	Director(s)	Notes
2021	Werewolves Within	Josh Ruben	UK première
1975	The Amusement Park	George A. Romero	
2019	Climate of the Hunter	Mickey Reece	UK première
2020	Riders of Justice	Anders Thomas Jensen	Preview
2020	The World We Knew	WW Jones, Luke Skinner	Scottish première
2020	Alien on Stage	Lucy Harvey, Danielle Kummer	Scottish première

=== 2022 ===
The 2022 festival, the first full festival since 2019 as a result of the COVID-19 pandemic, took place from 28 April–1 May 2022.

Year	Title	Director(s)	Notes
2021	We're All Going to the World's Fair	Jane Schoenbrun	Preview
1973	Ganja & Hess	Bill Gunn	
2021	Dashcam	Rob Savage	Preview
1994	Interview with the Vampire	Neil Jordan	
1922	Nosferatu	F. W. Murnau	
2021	Straight to VHS	Emilio Silva Torres	Scottish première
2021	Upurga	Uģis Olt	UK première
1988	Vampire's Kiss	Robert Bierman	
1970	The Vampire Doll	Michio Yamamoto	
2021	Ultrasound	Rob Schroeder	Preview
2021	Good Madam	Jenna Cato Bass	Preview
1998	Blade	Stephen Norrington	

=== 2023 ===
The 2023 festival took place from 11–14 May 2023, with the programme including one European première, one UK première and three Scottish premières, as well as a five-film retrospective of David Cronenberg.

Year	Title	Director(s)	Notes
2022	The Origin	Andrew Cumming	Preview
1981	Scanners	David Cronenberg	
2023	Abruptio	Evan Marlowe	European première
2022	Dark Nature	Berkley Brady	Scottish première
1983	Videodrome	David Cronenberg	
1988	Dead Ringers	David Cronenberg	
2022	No More Time	Dalila Droege	UK première
2022	Polaris	Kirsten Carthew	Scottish première
1979	The Brood	David Cronenberg	
1973	Messiah of Evil	Willard Huyck, Gloria Katz	
2022	Satanic Hispanics	Alejandro Brugués, Mike Mendez, Demián Rugna, Gigi Saul Guerrero, Eduardo Sánchez	Scottish première
1986	The Fly	David Cronenberg	

== See also ==
- Dead by Dawn (film festival)
- FrightFest (film festival)
