= Safia Oakley-Green =

English actress (born 2001)

- Oakley-Green at the 2026 BFI London Film Festival
- Born: Safia Grace Oakley-Green; June 2001 (age 25); Southwark, London, England, United Kingdom
- Occupation: Actress
- Years active: 2021–present

Safia Grace Oakley-Green (born June 2001) is an English actress. She won a British Independent Film Award and a Scottish BAFTA for her performance in the horror film Out of Darkness (2022). She was named a 2023 Screen International Star of Tomorrow.

== Early life ==
Oakley-Green was born in Southwark, London before moving to Derbyshire. She is of Irish descent on her mother's side and Jamaican descent on her father's. Oakley-Green trained at the Television Workshop in Nottingham. She has a first class honours Psychology degree from the University of London.

== Career ==
In 2021, she appeared in the horror short film Requiem alongside fellow Television Workshop alum Bella Ramsey. The short picked up increased attention after Ramsey's performance in the HBO television series The Last of Us raised their profile.

Oakley-Green made her feature film debut in the 2021 biopic The Colour Room for Sky Cinema alongside Phoebe Dynevor. She made her television debut as Cinderella Jackson in the 2022 BBC One crime drama Sherwood. Also in 2022, she starred in the Scottish caveman horror Out of Darkness, previously entitled The Origin, for which she received the British Independent Film Award for Breakthrough Performance in December 2022. She later also given the best film actress award by BAFTA Scotland for the role.

In 2023, Oakley-Green had a recurring role as Andy in the first series of Disney+ comedy Extraordinary. She has roles in the second series of The Lazarus Project on Sky Max and the Paramount+ series The Burning Girls.

== Filmography ==
=== Film ===
Year	Title	Role	Notes
2021	Requiem	Mary	Short
2021	The Colour Room	Elsie	
2022	Out of Darkness	Beyah	
2022	She Said	Dancer	
2025	100 Nights of Hero	Kiddo	
2025	Anemone	Hattie	
2026	The Bluff	Elizabeth "Lizzy" Bodden	
2026	The State of Us	Rosie	

=== Television ===
Year	Title	Role	Notes
2022	Sherwood	Cinderella Jackson	5 episodes
2023	Extraordinary	Andy	3 episodes
2023	The Burning Girls	Joy Harris	4 episodes
2023	The Lazarus Project	Becky	Series 2
2026	It Gets Worse		
TBA	Legacy of Spies	Molly Gibson	

== Awards and nominations ==
Year	Award	Category	Work	Result	Ref
2022	British Independent Film Awards	Breakthrough Performance	Out of Darkness	Won	
2024	British Academy Scotland Awards	Best Actress in Film	Out of Darkness	Won	
