= Ramzan Miah =

British actor, model, dancer, and television (born 1993)

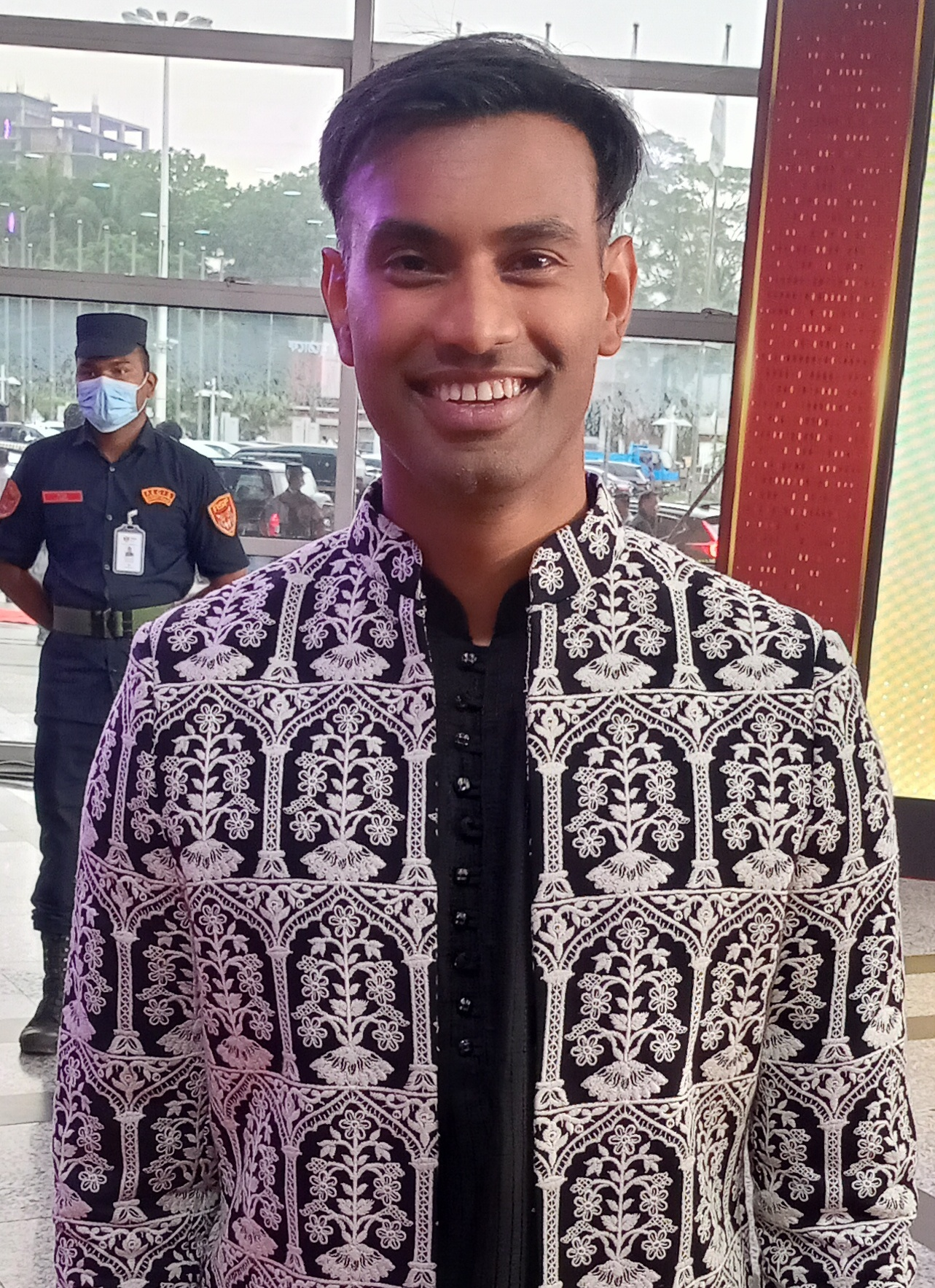
- Born: 19 July 1993 (age 33); Luton, England
- Education: Bird College
- Occupations: Actor, dancer, model
- Years active: 2010-present
- Awards: Male Model of the Year: 2022 British Bangladeshi Fashion and Lifestyle Awards; Hello! magazine rising star 2022

Ramzan Miah (born 17 July 1993) is a British actor, model, dancer, and television personality of Bangladeshi origin. Miah started his career in the entertainment industry as a model and later transitioned to acting. He is known for appearing in Ghost Stories, Rocketman, Disney's Aladdin, Everybody's Talking About Jamie, and Enola Holmes 2.

== Early life ==
Ramzan Miah was born and raised in Luton, England. His parents are from Bangladesh. He trained at Bird College in musical theatre and dance and graduated in 2016.

== Career ==
Miah made his acting debut at the age of 3 in Sylheti natoks as a child actor. He took a break from acting in natoks at the age of 15 and focused on his academic subjects. He resumed acting when he completed his GCSEs. He went on to play various roles in films including, Legacy (2015), Naca (2017), Ghost Stories (2017), The Devil's Harmony (a short film winner at Sundance 2020), Raindance 2020 (Best British Short Film at the London Critics Circle 2020, and BIFA nominee), and Everybody's Talking About Jamie (2021).

He has also worked as a dancer in Rocketman (2019) and Aladdin (2019). Miah is a part of the cast of Barbie, a comedy film, where he plays the role of a South Asian Ken.

He began his modeling career at the age of 17, modelling for L'Oréal, Boss, Paul Smith, Bulgari, Dior, G Star RAW, River Island, and Levi's, among others. He has also worked with clothing brands such as French Connection, Guess, Superdry, Burton, Abercrombie & Fitch and ASOS. In 2018, he worked for London Fashion Week as a Bangladeshi male model. He has been on the cover of magazines such as of Ice Today, Style Cruze, I-D and Kult Magazine and been featured in Grazia.

In addition to his work in film and modeling, Miah has also appeared on television. He was a model on an episode of The Apprentice UK in 2010. He has also appeared in TV series such as SAS: Rogue Heroes (2022), House of the Dragon (2022), Quiz (2020), and Corner Shop Show (2019). He starred as a lead guest on the BBC's Strictly Come Dancing Bollywood piece in 2022.

== Personal life ==
Aside from his acting and modeling career, Miah is also an advocate for inclusivity and diversity in the entertainment industry. He has spoken out about the lack of representation of South Asian actors in the media and has advocated for more opportunities for actors of colour. He has expressed interest in working on an English movie/series in Bangladesh. He is an ambassador of The Mix, a digital support service for young people.

== Awards ==
- Male Model of the Year: 2022 British Bangladeshi Fashion and Lifestyle Awards
- Hello! magazine rising star 2022
