= Patsy Ferran =

Spanish-British actress (born 1989)

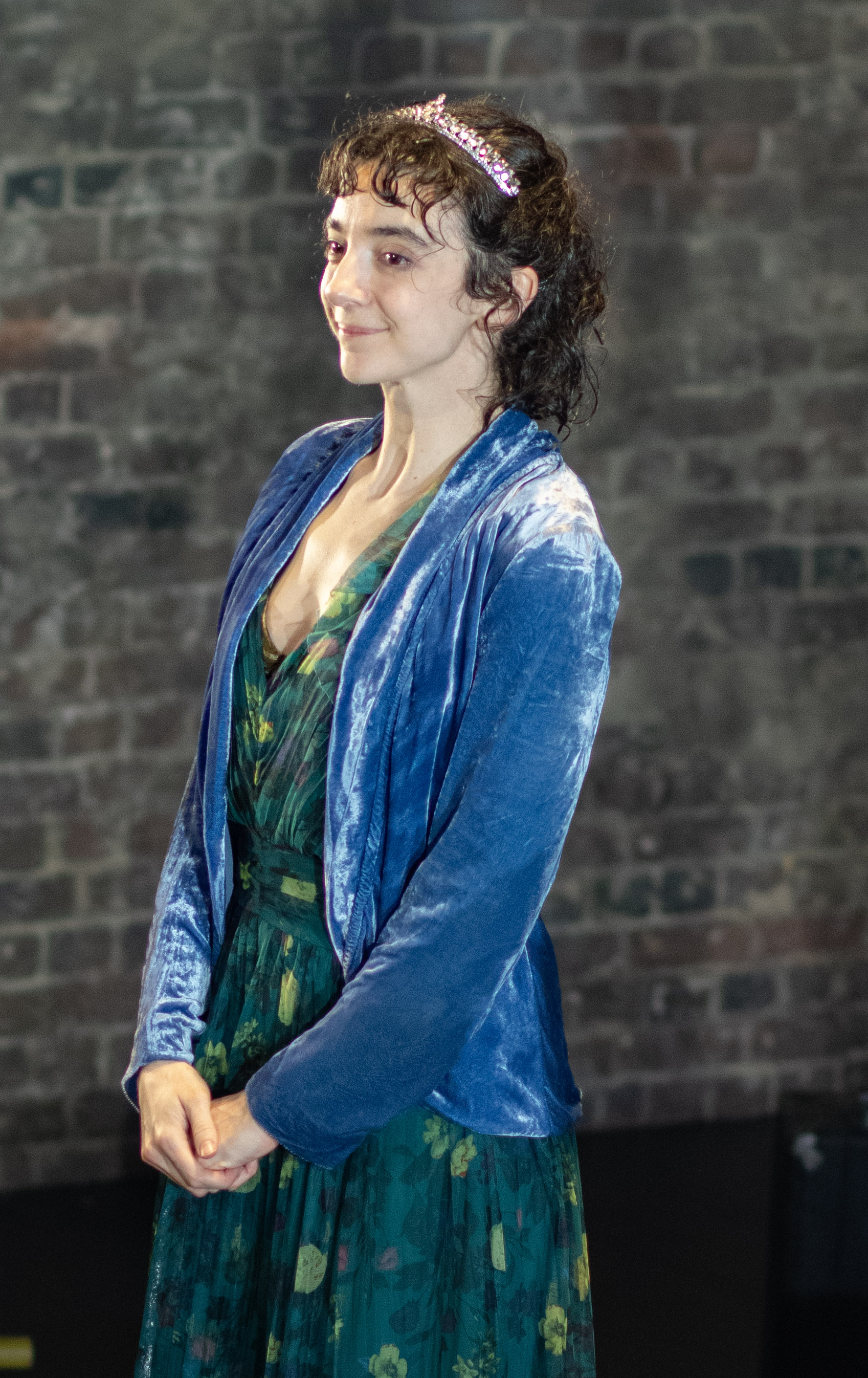
- Ferran on stage at the Noël Coward Theatre, London
- Born: Patricia Ferran; 25 November 1989 (age 36); Valencia, Spain
- Education: Royal Academy of Dramatic Art
- Occupation: Actor
- Years active: 2014–present

Patricia Ferran (born 25 November 1989) is a Spanish-British actress. She trained at the Royal Academy of Dramatic Art before becoming known for her roles on stage and screen. She has received a number of accolades including a Laurence Olivier Award.

Ferran started her career acting on the London stage acting in a revival of Noël Coward's Blithe Spirit (2014). She went on to win the Laurence Olivier Award for Best Actress for her role in the Tennessee Williams revival Summer and Smoke (2018). She was Olivier-nominated for her performance as Blanche DuBois in another Tennessee Williams revival A Streetcar Named Desire (2023).

She made her film debut in Tulip Fever (2017). She has since taken roles in Darkest Hour (2017), Living (2022), Firebrand (2023), and Mickey 17 (2025). On television, she had a regular supporting part in Jamestown (2017) and took roles in Black Narcissus (2020), Black Mirror (2025) and Miss Austen (2025).

== Early life and education ==
Ferran was born in Valencia, Spain, in 1989. Her father is from Barcelona and her mother is from Valencia. The family moved to England when Ferran was a child. She attended Notre Dame School, an all-girls convent school in Cobham, Surrey.

She read Drama and Theatre Arts at Birmingham University, and trained at the Royal Academy of Dramatic Art, graduating in 2014.

== Career ==
In 2017, Ferran made her early appearances in three films; the costume drama Tulip Fever, the romance drama God's Own Country, and the historical drama Darkest Hour. That same year she made her television debut acting in three projects; the Netflix miniseries Guerrilla, the British series Jamestown, and the TNT historical fiction series Will. In 2018 she acted in a Rebecca Frecknall-directed revival of the Tennessee Williams play Summer and Smoke playing Alma Winemiller at the Almeida Theatre. Michael Billington of The Guardian praised her performance declaring, that the production was built "around Patsy Ferran, who confirms her status as one of the most exciting actors on the British stage." For her performance she won the Laurence Olivier Award for Best Actress. In 2019 she played Björk in the coming of age film How to Build a Girl. The following year she played a nun in the miniseries Black Narcissus (2020).

In 2022, she had a supporting role in the drama Living starring Bill Nighy. That same year, she returned to the theatre taking a leading role as Blanche DuBois acting opposite Paul Mescal as Stanley Kowalski in the revival of the Tennessee Williams play A Streetcar Named Desire. For the production she reunited with director Rebecca Frecknall. The play received positive reviews with critics praising her performance. Demetrois Mattheou of The Hollywood Reporter noted, "[Ferran] joined the production just before it was to open...when Lydia Wilson had to withdraw due to injury. The rescue act makes her heartbreaking, very individual performance even more remarkable." He added, "Ferran enthusiastically gobbles up Williams’ lines, capturing the wit of the wobbly flirt perfectly, accompanied by a dry, bitter self-knowledge". For her performance she was nominated for the Laurence Olivier Award for Best Actress, losing to Jodie Comer in the one-woman show Prima Facie. She and Mescal reprised their roles at the Brooklyn Academy of Music in 2025.

== Acting credits ==
=== Film ===
Year	Title	Role	Notes
2017	Tulip Fever	Tart	
2017	God's Own Country	Robyn	
2017	Darkest Hour	Maid	
2019	How to Build a Girl	Björk	
2019	The Devil's Harmony	Kiera	Short Film
2021	Tom & Jerry	Joy	
2021	Mothering Sunday	Milly	
2022	Living	Fiona	
2023	Firebrand	Mary I	
2024	White Bird	Mille Petitjean	
2025	Mickey 17	Dorothy	
2025	Hot Milk	Nurse Julieta	
2025	Jay Kelly	Brenda	
2027	Jack of Spades		Post-production

=== Television ===
Year	Title	Role	Notes
2017	Guerrilla	Gwen	Miniseries, 2 episodes
2017	Jamestown	Mercy Myrtle	Recurring role, 24 episodes
2017	Will	Peg	Episode: "Your Houses"
2020	Black Narcissus	Sister Blanche	Miniseries, 3 episodes
2022	Life After Life	Pamela	Miniseries, 4 episodes
2025	Miss Austen	Jane Austen	Miniseries, 4 episodes
2025	Black Mirror	The guide / Kelly Royce	Episode: "Eulogy"
2026	Zog	Doctor Princess Pearl (voice)	52 episodes

=== Theatre ===
Year	Title	Role	Venue	Ref.
2014	Blithe Spirit	Edith	Gielgud Theatre	
2014	The Angry Brigade	Anna	Theatre Royal, Plymouth	
2014	The Angry Brigade	Anna	Oxford Playhouse	
2014	The Angry Brigade	Anna	Warwick Arts Centre	
2014	The Angry Brigade	Anna	Watford Palace Theatre	
2014	Treasure Island	Jim	National Theatre	
2015	The Merchant of Venice	Portia	Royal Shakespeare Company	
2016	As You Like It	Celia	National Theatre	
2017	Speech & Debate	Diwata	Trafalgar Studios	
2018	My Mum's a Twat	Girl	Royal Court Theatre	
2018	Summer and Smoke	Alma Winemiller	Almeida Theatre	
2018	Summer and Smoke	Alma Winemiller	Duke of York's Theatre	
2019	Three Sisters	Olga Sergeyevna	Almeida Theatre	
2020	Who's Afraid of Virginia Woolf?	Honey	Booth Theatre	
2020	A Christmas Carol	Various roles	Bridge Theatre	
2021	Camp Siegfried	Her	Old Vic	
2022	A Streetcar Named Desire	Blanche DuBois	Almeida Theatre	
2023	A Streetcar Named Desire	Blanche DuBois	Phoenix Theatre	
2023	Pygmalion	Eliza Doolittle	The Old Vic	
2025	A Streetcar Named Desire	Blanche DuBois	Noël Coward Theatre; Brooklyn Academy of Music	

=== Audio ===
Year	Title	Role	Notes
2022	North and South	Margaret Hale	BBC Radio
2024	The Mysterious Affair at Styles	Mary Cavendish	Audible original

== Awards and nominations ==
Year	Award	Category	Work	Result	Ref.
2014	Critics' Circle Theatre Award	Most Promising Newcomer	Blithe Spirit and Treasure Island	Won	
2015	Standard Theatre Awards	Emerging Talent Award	Treasure Island	Nominated	
2019	Laurence Olivier Award	Best Actress	Summer and Smoke	Won	
2019	Critics’ Circle Theatre Award	Best Actress	Summer and Smoke	Won	
2019	WhatsOnStage Award	Best Actress in a Play	Summer and Smoke	Nominated	
2023	Laurence Olivier Award	Best Actress	A Streetcar Named Desire	Nominated	
