= The Midwife's Apprentice =

1995 book by Karen Cushman

- Author: Karen Cushman
- Language: English
- Genre: Children's Historical Fiction
- Publisher: Houghton Mifflin
- Publication date: March 1995
- Publication place: United States
- Media type: Print (Hardback and Paperback)
- Pages: 122 pp
- ISBN: 0-613-00185-0
- OCLC: 173089913
- LC Class: PZ7.C962 Mi 1995

The Midwife's Apprentice is a children's novel by Karen Cushman. It tells of how a homeless girl becomes a midwife's apprentice—and establishes a name and a place in the world, and learns to hope and overcome failure. This novel won the John Newbery Medal in 1996.

Mary Beth Dunhouse, chair of the Newbery Award Selection Committee, wrote of the book, "The reader is drawn in from the first sentence when the author speaks of a 'rotting and moiling heap. 'And this is when the reader meets the central character, Brat--'unwashed, unnourished, unloved, and unlovely... who dreamed of nothing, for she hoped of nothing and expected nothing.' This homeless waif becomes the midwife's apprentice--a person with a name and a place in the world. Medieval England is well-evoked, and readers will find this world so compelling that they will keep turning pages to see what happens next."

In an interview in Scholastic Magazine, Ms. Cushman says, "The book took about 9 months to write, the same length of time it takes to make a child. Interesting, huh? I had done a lot of research on the Middle Ages for Catherine, Called Birdy, so I knew a lot about the time and place. The research I did was for specific about childbirth, herbs, and healing."

== Plot ==
In medieval Europe, a homeless orphan girl who has no name, and can recall being named Brat, attempts to nestle in a warm dung heap on a cold night. She wakes up to the taunts of village boys, and the words of the harsh and uncaring Jane Sharp, the local midwife. Jane takes the girl on as her apprentice and renames her "Beetle," but does not teach Beetle about midwifery for fear of competition.

Beetle learns what she can anyway, and starts to grow as a person through various experiences. She even has a chance to claim a new name, Alyce, after being mistaken for another girl with the same name. Alyce befriends a homeless, orphaned boy, who, with some prompting, names himself Edward after the King. She tells him to go to a local manor to get food and a job.

Jane helps a woman in labor with the help of Alyce, and word arrives the Lady of the Manor is in labor. Jane abandons the new mother to Alyce's care to the Lady. Alyce is kind to the woman and successfully delivers the baby, and the grateful parents pay her and name the child "Alyce Little." Soon after, a woman's son comes to Alyce asking her to deliver her baby. This is a more difficult birth, and Alyce is overwhelmed by her inability to help. Jane sweeps in and completes the job, and Alyce flees with her cat, not wanting to endure the shame.

In another town, she comes to an inn where the kindly owner gives Alyce work in exchange for food, and a scholar from Oxford, staying for the winter, teaches Alyce how to read and write. As time goes on, Alyce comes to miss little Edward. She returns to the village to check on him, and their reunion is like that of a brother and sister, but Alyce can't stay for long. She returns to the inn just in time to find a married couple begging for aid. It turns out the woman is in labor, but neither she nor her husband knew she was pregnant. Alyce is able to help, and the birth goes well, making Alyce realize that she truly wants to be a midwife. Filled with a new sense of self-purpose, she returns to the midwife's home and asks to be her apprentice again, declaring she won't stop coming to Jane's door until she's allowed back, and she will work harder than ever.

The story ends with Jane wordlessly letting Alyce in.

Preceded by Walk Two Moons	Newbery Medal recipient 1996	Succeeded by The View from Saturday
