= Requiem (2021 film) =

English drama short film

- Festival premiere poster
- Directed by: Em Gilberston
- Screenplay by: Laura Jayne Tunbridge
- Produced by: Michelle Brøndum
- Starring: Bella Ramsey; Safia Oakley-Green
- Cinematography: Joseph Guy
- Edited by: Oli Bauer
- Music by: Madison Willing
- Production company: National Film and Television School
- Release date: 2021
- Running time: 25 minutes
- Country: United Kingdom
- Language: English

Requiem is a 2021 British horror/drama short film directed by Em Gilberston, written by Laura Jayne Tunbridge, and produced by Michelle Brøndum. It stars Bella Ramsey and Safia Oakley-Green.

== Plot ==
In 1605, religious conservatism rules parts of England and witch trials are a present danger for nonconformist women. Evelyn attempts to evade the wrath of her father Minister Gilbert to be with her lover Mary. When Minister Gilbert uses his influence to have Mary condemned and burned as a witch, Evelyn unites the village women to rally for vengeance against him.

== Cast ==
- Bella Ramsey as Evelyn
- Safia Oakley-Green as Mary
- Simon Balcon as Minister Gilbert
- Sean Buchanan as Minister Shorter
- Jack Norris as Matthew Shorter
- Jack Condon as Abe
- Juliet Dante as Agnes
- Jason Adam as Josiah

== Production ==
The film was directed by Em Gilbertson and written by Laura Jayne Tunbridge. The film was produced by Michelle Brøndum. Filming took place at the Avoncroft Museum of Historic Buildings in Bromsgrove. The film's director Em Gilberston told PinkNews of the importance "for all queer people that we don't forget our history. We have to take lessons from the past to tackle the systemic prejudice still around us and fight for our future".

== Release ==
In March 2023 the short film was made available to view on the Alter YouTube channel. The film was shown at the Cleveland Film Festival on March 24, 2023, before it plays at the Lighthouse International Film Festival in June 2023.

== Reception ==
Beatrice Fanucci in Ireland's GCN described Ramsey's "heartwrenching performance". Lyra Hale in Fangirlish discussed how the film was "beautifully brought to life" by the performances of Ramsey and Oakley-Green.
