= Out of Darkness (2022 film) =

British film directed by Andrew Cumming

- Film poster
- Directed by: Andrew Cumming
- Screenplay by: Ruth Greenberg
- Produced by: Oliver Kassman; Wendy Griffin
- Starring: Safia Oakley-Green; Chuku Modu; Kit Young
- Cinematography: Ben Fordesman
- Edited by: Paolo Pandolpho
- Music by: Adam Janota Bzowski
- Production companies: Animal Kingdom; Escape Plan; Selkie Productions
- Distributed by: Signature Entertainment
- Release dates: 6 October 2022 (London); 9 February 2024 (United Kingdom)
- Running time: 87 minutes
- Country: United Kingdom
- Languages: English (text); Tola (spoken)
- Box office: $2 million

Out of Darkness (previously titled The Origin) is a 2022 British adventure horror thriller film directed by Andrew Cumming in his feature-length debut and starring Safia Oakley-Green and Chuku Modu.

Out of Darkness had its world premiere at the BFI London Film Festival on 6 October 2022. The film was nominated for five awards at the 2023 British Independent Film Awards, winning best breakthrough performance for Oakley-Green.

== Plot ==
In Upper Paleolithic Europe, 45,000 years ago, six humans arrived on the shores of unknown land in search of a better life: group leader Adem, his pregnant mate Ave, his younger brother Geirr, and his 11-year-old son Heron. Beyah, a young woman, and Odal, an older man, are also with them.

As they journey toward the mountains, searching for a cave to settle, the group encounters a mysterious creature, and Heron is abducted at night. The group is forced to follow Adem when he insists on pursuing it into the woods. They become lost in the forest, and Adem attempts to track the creature alone as darkness falls. He is attacked and is brought back to the group's camp by Geirr with mortal wounds. Beyah mercy kills Adem, and at her suggestion, all but Geirr cannibalize his body to avoid starving.

Geirr unsuccessfully attempts to lead the group through the woods. Odal, believing that they are being stalked by a demon, blames Beyah's menstrual cycle and attempts to sacrifice her with Ave's help. During the scuffle, Geirr is knocked unconscious, and Beyah escapes; Odal instead offers a replacement by stabbing Ave, but she manages to break his ankle in the process. With the forest lit by aurora borealis, Odal watches as the creature takes Ave's body. At dawn, Beyah finds Geirr, and they witness the creature killing Odal and ambush it, but it escapes. They discovered it was a female Neanderthal wearing a mask. They trail her to the mountain and find a cave where Beyah believes the Neanderthal lives.

After Beyah enters the cave, she is attacked by a male Neanderthal who pins her to the ground, attempting to strangle her. She feigns death and then stabs him, compelling him to roll off of her. Beyah retrieves her wooden spear and mortally wounds the Neanderthal. Then she continues into the cave, where she discovers an unharmed Heron and is confronted by the Neanderthal female. Geirr, hearing Beyah's screams, finishes off the dying male Neanderthal and continues through the cave to find Beyah. The female Neanderthal then attacks Geirr with a stone ax and kills him. The female Neanderthal threatens Beyah, who sets fur bedding on fire and escapes with Heron through a small vertical opening in the cave. The female Neanderthal attempts to escape but becomes stuck at the top of the opening, but while Heron tries to help her, Beyah kills her with a rock. She tells Heron the Neanderthals are monsters who killed the group, while he says, "They are like us," implying that they abducted him to feed and protect him.

The film ends with Beyah detailing their story; she seems to regret killing the Neanderthals, remarking they were just people as terrified of the unknown as her group. Heron shows Beyah Ave's body laid out in the cave, which had been prepared for a funeral by the Neanderthals. The two bury the dead, and Beyah, now claiming the cave, remarks, "She and the boy learned to survive, the first of a new people." Her last words in answer to Heron's question: "What do we do now?" are "We try again," presumably with the lessons that they have learned.

== Cast ==
- Safia Oakley-Green as Beyah
- Chuku Modu as Adem
- Kit Young as Geirr
- Iola Evans as Ave
- Luna Mwezi as Heron
- Arno Luening as Odal

== Production ==
Speaking to Screen Daily in 2021, Cumming called the project "a paleolithic horror film". He first discussed the film's idea with producer Oliver Kassman in 2015, and the pair invited Ruth Greenberg on board to script the project.

Kassman produced the film for Escape Plan and executive produced by David Kaplan and Sam Intili on behalf of Animal Kingdom. It was co-produced by Wendy Griffin of Selkie Productions. Financing came from Screen Scotland and the BFI, awarding funds from the National Lottery.

Principal photography took place during the COVID-19 pandemic lockdown in November 2020 around Gairloch in Scotland. The production company hired out the Gairloch Hotel, and all filming took place within a mile of the venue.

The film is entirely in an artificial language named Tola, invented by Daniel Andersson and based on Arabic and Basque.

== Release ==
Out of Darkness (then titled The Origin) had its world premiere at the BFI London Film Festival. The film had its Scotland premiere on 5 March 2023 as part of the 2023 Glasgow Film Festival. It was screened at Dundead in May 2023.

In May 2023, it was reported that Bleecker Street had acquired North American rights from Stage 6 Films. Shortly after, Signature Entertainment bought United Kingdom and Irish rights, and planned to release it later that year. In October 2023, Bleecker Street scheduled a theatrical release for 9 February 2024.

== Reception ==
=== Critical reception ===
On the review aggregator website Rotten Tomatoes, 86% of 112 critics' reviews are positive, with an average rating of 6.7/10. The website's consensus reads: "A survival thriller reduced to the bare essentials, Out of Darkness offers a chilling reminder that the horror of looming death might be humanity's most universal experience." Metacritic, which uses a weighted average, assigned the film a score of 68 out of 100, based on 18 critics, indicating "generally favorable" reviews.

In a positive review, Dennis Harvey of Variety wrote, "What works on-screen are the basic but invaluable elements of striking visuals and a mood of palpable danger that occasionally explodes into blunt violence. Further helping maintain a tenor of anxious vulnerability is Adam Janota Bzowski's original score, which is almost exclusively percussive." Glenn Kenny of RogerEbert.com gave the film three out of four stars and wrote, "The story told in Out of Darkness is ultimately sad more than terrifying, a parable about violence and the roots of human war. It's an impressively credible and gnarly journey back in time." Kevin Maher of The Times gave it 4/5 stars, writing, "It's not often that a disposable jump-scare horror will send you scrambling for a copy of Yuval Noah Harari's bestseller Sapiens, yet such is the allure of this quietly brainy British feature debut that extra reading seems almost essential."

Michael Atkinson of The Village Voice was more critical, writing, "The movie is not ultimately the horror film it's being marketed as, it's more like a cave-dwelling slasher film, with a late-in-the-game swivel toward interspecies tolerance and understanding that doesn't quite dovetail with the shredded bodies."

=== Accolades ===
The film received multiple nominations at the British Independent Film Awards, including best debut director for Cumming, best breakthrough for Oakley-Green, best music for Adam Janota Bzowski, best hair and make up for Niamh Morrison, and best debut screenplay for Ruth Greenberg. Oakley-Green won the British Independent Film Award for Breakthrough Performance on the night. Young and Oakley-Green were later given best film and film actress awards by BAFTA Scotland for the film, which won best feature film at the ceremony.
