= Karen Cushman =

American writer

- Cushman on Vashon Island
- Born: October 4, 1941 (age 85); Chicago, Illinois, US
- Education: Stanford University
- Occupation: Writer
- Writing career
- Genre: Young adult historical novels
- Notable works: Catherine, Called Birdy; The Midwife's Apprentice
- Notable awards: Newbery Medal; 1996

Karen Cushman (born October 4, 1941) is an American writer of historical fiction.

== Career ==
Cushman's 1995 novel The Midwife's Apprentice won the Newbery Medal for children's literature, and her 1994 novel Catherine, Called Birdy won a Newbery Honor. She has a bachelor of arts degree in Greek and English from Stanford University and master's degrees in human behavior and museum studies. For eleven years, she was adjunct professor in the Museum Studies Department at John F. Kennedy University before resigning in 1996 to write full-time. She lives and writes on Vashon Island, Washington.

== Books ==
- Catherine, Called Birdy (1994)
- The Midwife's Apprentice (1995)
- The Ballad of Lucy Whipple (1996)
- Matilda Bone (2000)
- Rodzina (2004)
- The Loud Silence of Francine Green (2006)
- Alchemy and Meggy Swann (2010)
- Will Sparrow's Road (2012)
- Grayling's Song (2016)
- War and Millie McGonigle (2021)
- When Sally O'Malley Discovered the Sea (2025)

== Other media ==
The Ballad of Lucy Whipple was made into a TV film, broadcast in 2001. Catherine Called Birdy was made into a film in 2022, see Catherine Called Birdy (film).

== Awards ==
- 1995 Newbery Honor for Catherine, Called Birdy
- 1995 Golden Kite Award for Catherine, Called Birdy
- 1996 Newbery Medal for The Midwife's Apprentice
- 1997 John and Patricia Beatty Award for The Ballad of Lucy Whipple, given by the California Library Association.
- 2004 Washington State Book Award for Rodzina
- 2007 Kerlan Award at the University of Minnesota's Children's Literature Research Collection for her contributions to the Kerlan Collection.
