= Dylan Holmes Williams =

British film director and writer

- Born: December 1992 (age 33)
- Occupations: Director; screenwriter; film editor
- Years active: 2016–present
- Notable work: The Devil's Harmony
- Awards: Sundance Film Festival (Grand Jury Prize)
- Website: dylanholmeswilliams.com

Dylan Holmes Williams (born in December 1992) is a British film director and screenwriter based in London.

== Biography ==
His first short film, The Nightmare on Deskteeth Street, premiered at BFI London Film Festival 2017.

In 2020, his second short film The Devil’s Harmony won the Jury Prize for International Fiction at Sundance Film Festival. In 2019, it won the Best UK Short Jury Prize at Raindance Film Festival, a Best Director award at Fantastic Fest, British / Irish Short Film of the Year at the London Film Critics Circle Awards and was nominated for a British Independent Film Award (BIFA) for Best British Short Film. In 2021, it was acquired by the Criterion Channel.

His third short film, Stilts, directed in 2019, was programmed by Film4 & Channel 4. It aired on Channel 4 in the UK and later before previews of Robert Eggers’ The Lighthouse at UK cinemas. Its North American premiere was at Slamdance Film Festival 2021.

In 2021, he directed two episodes of the third season of M. Night Shyamalan's Apple TV+ show Servant, followed by two episodes of the fourth season.

== Filmography ==
=== Film ===
Year	Title	Director	Writer	Editor	Notes
2016	Chubby Funny	No	No	Yes	
2017	The Nightmare on Deskteeth Street	Yes	No	No	Short film
2019	The Devil's Harmony	Yes	Yes	No	Short film
2019	Stilts	Yes	Yes	No	Short film
2020	Say Your Prayers	No	No	Yes	
2021	Catching the Bus	Yes	No	No	Short film

=== Television ===
Year	Title	Notes	Ref.
2022–2023	Servant	4 episodes	
2024	Doctor Who	2 episodes	
2025	The War Between the Land and the Sea	5 episodes	

=== Music videos ===
Year	Title	Artist	Ref.
2016	"4AM"	HUNTAR	
2016	"I'll Make It Worth Your While"	Artificial Pleasure	
2018	"Never Really Cared"	Banfi	
2018	"Confessions in the Pool"	Ash	
