= The Devil's Harmony =

Live action short film

- Film Poster
- Directed by: Dylan Holmes Williams
- Screenplay by: Jess O’Kane & Dylan Holmes Williams
- Produced by: Nathan Craig; Anthony Toma
- Starring: Patsy Ferran; Leo Suter; Guy Henry; Bobby Schofield
- Cinematography: David Wright
- Production company: Tatata Studios · Toma Productions
- Distributed by: Salaud Morisset
- Release date: September 2019 (Encounters)
- Running time: 14 minutes
- Country: United Kingdom
- Language: English

The Devil's Harmony is a live action short film directed by Dylan Holmes Williams in 2019.

In 2020, it won the Jury Prize for International Fiction at Sundance Film Festival. In 2019, it won the Best UK Short Jury Prize at Raindance Film Festival, a Best Director award at Fantastic Fest and British / Irish Short Film of the Year at the London Film Critics Circle Awards. It was nominated for a British Independent Film Award (BIFA) for Best British Short Film.

The Devil's Harmony was produced by Nathan Craig (Tatata Studios) and distributed worldwide by the International Production & Distribution company Salaud Morisset.

== Plot ==
Kiera is a bullied teenage girl and the captain of her high school's glee club. A mysterious epidemic has spread throughout the school, with many of the athletes from the snobbish, abusive squash team falling into inexplicable and unending sleep. It is revealed that Kiera is responsible for these events: frustrated by the lack of support from the unsympathetic school staff regarding her bullying, she has been taking revenge by leading the glee club to ambush her enemies with a low, ominous "devil's harmony" that causes them to fall into a vegetative state.

Kiera's scheme becomes complicated when the next target is Connor, an athlete who had previously rejected Kiera's advances but, after a change of heart, wants to leave the squash team and his old friends in order to be with her and pursue his secret love of singing. Unaware that he is the next target, he plans to invite his remaining team members to his house to announce the news and asks Kiera to come over that night. Kiera, attempting to save him, intentionally leads the club to the wrong house before leaving on her own to look for Connor. However, Connor's friends, incensed at his declaration, have locked him in his closet and trick Kiera into believing that he is sleeping with someone else.

Connor escapes the next morning and runs to the school, where he discovers that the entire student body is comatose. He encounters a vengeful Kiera with her glee club, but as the members harmonize, he breaks into song and reveals the truth before declaring his love for her. The glee club, shocked and betrayed, sing the devil's harmony, causing Connor and Kiera (who was not wearing the earplugs she usually used for protection) to fall asleep. Now leaderless, the film ends with the club standing quietly as the students around them sleep.

== Cast ==
In credits order
Patsy Ferran	as Kiera
Leo Suter	as Connor
Bobby Schofield	as Doug
Rest of cast listed alphabetically:
Jordan Ajadi	as Schmidt
Cassian Bilton	as Kornitzer
Guy Henry	as Headmaster Plugg
Ramzan Miah	as Lawrence
Matthew Morrison	as Philips
Kieran Slade	as Michael
Kit Young	as Tyrone

== Awards ==
Since its launch, the film has been selected in many festivals around the world.

Year	Festival	Award/Category	Status
2019	Encounters Film Festival	Brief Encounters Grand Prix	Nominated
2019	British Independent Film Awards (BIFA)	Best British Short	Nominated
2019	Raindance Film Festival	Jury Prize – Best UK Short	Won
2019	Sitges Film Festival	Official Fantastic Selection	Nominated
2019	PÖFF Tallinn Festival	International Short Film Competition	Nominated
2019	Austin Fantastic Fest	Short Fuse Award – Best Director	Won
2019	American Film Institute Festival	Official Competition	Nominated
2019	Underwire Film Festival	Best Film	Nominated
2020	Palm Springs International ShortFest	Best of the Festival	Nominated
2020	Sundance Film Festival	Short Film Grand Jury Prize	Won
2020	Berlin British Shorts Film Festival	Jury Award	Won
2020	London Film Critics' Circle Award	British Short Film of the Year	Won
2020	Florida Film Festival	Grand Jury Award – Best Short	Nominated
2020	San Francisco International Film Festival	Best Narrative Short	Nominated
2020	Norwegian Short Film Festival	Best International Short Film	Won
2020	London Short Film Festival	Best Short Film	Nominated
