= Catherine, Called Birdy =

1994 novel by Karen Cushman

- 1994 Edition
- Author: Karen Cushman
- Illustrator: Bryan Leister (1994 Cover Art)
- Language: English
- Genre: Historical Fiction
- Publisher: Clarion Books
- Publication date: 1994
- Publication place: England
- Media type: Print (hardback)
- Pages: 169
- ISBN: 978-03-9568186-2

Catherine, Called Birdy is the first children's novel written by Karen Cushman. It is a historical novel in diary format, set in 13th-century England. It was published in 1994, and won a Newbery Honor and Golden Kite Award in 1995.

== Plot ==
The story begins in September 1290, when Catherine describes her world: her father's manor, her father and mother themselves (her father is bawdy, loud, and disagreeable; her mother is kind and sweet), and the people she encounters daily. The novel is marked by the Catholic Saints' Days. Catherine is called "Birdy" because she keeps many birds as pets. She has three older brothers. The eldest, Robert, is a knight. He weds his betrothed though she is only 12, and she dies from complications while giving birth to their child. Catherine's second brother, Thomas, is in the king's service. Edward, with whom she corresponds and is closest, is a monk who lives in an abbey nearby.

Catherine's relationship with her parents is a pervasive element in the plot. Her mother wishes her to be an accomplished and docile lady, while her father wishes to make advantageous social connections through her marriage. Several suitors approach Stonebridge Manor intending to woo Lady Catherine, but all fall short of her expectations and devices. Eventually, Catherine's father demands that she marry an old, repulsive man she calls "Shaggy Beard" in her diary. She spends the year described in her diary fighting the marriage, devising various escapes and alternate versions of her life where she will run away and be a monk, or escape overseas and go on the Crusades. Catherine does not want to marry anybody, but she has to unfortunately.

One of the book's largest subplots occurs when her favorite uncle, George, comes home from the Crusades and falls in love with Catherine's best friend, Lady Aelis. Because George does not have a high position in society, they cannot marry, and both end up wedding others: George, an eccentric older Saxon businesswoman named Ethelfritha, who was struck by lightning; Aelis, a seven-year-old duke. Catherine begins to wonder about fate, love, and responsibility.

As the day of Catherine's wedding approaches, she runs away to her uncle and aunt. She realizes she will be the same no matter whom she marries; thus, she allows her uncle to take her home. But when she arrives, she is confronted with the happy news that Shaggy Beard has died in a tavern brawl and she is now engaged to his son, Stephen, who is clean, young, and educated. This match pleases her greatly, and she starts to dream about marrying him, counting down the days until she can see him.

Catherine, Called Birdy discusses everything from the mundane events of her life (killing fleas, spinning, and embroidery) to festivals and holidays (such as Easter or May Day, many of which are celebrated by the entire village) to her travels in England, which are limited (she goes, for example, to Lincoln with her father, or to spend a few days at Lady Aelis's manor).

== Development ==
In an interview with ipl2, Cushman said of this book, "I had been interested in the Middle Ages for a long time. I like the music, the costumes, the pageantry, and the color. It seems an interesting time, when western civilization was growing towards the Renaissance just like a child growing into adolescence. I first thought about writing books set at that time after reading about the lives of children in times past." Cushman describes the concept she had for the book, a diary of the intimate details of the life and thoughts of a young woman in medieval England: "I thought about what life might have been like for them when they had no power and little value. Especially girl children. I wondered how they coped with their lack of value and still kept a sense of their own worth; how they made choices when there were few options; how they survived when they had little power."

In a recorded interview on teachingbooks.net, Cushman says that she was 50 when she wrote this, her first book, and tells how she came to write it.

== Reception ==
Kirkus Reviews found "The period has rarely been presented for young people with such authenticity; the exotic details will intrigue readers while they relate more closely to Birdy's yen for independence and her sensibilities toward the downtrodden. Her tenacity and ebullient naivete are extraordinary; at once comic and thought-provoking, this first novel is a delight." Publishers Weekly wrote, "Despite the too-convenient ending, this first novel introduces an admirable heroine and pungently evokes a largely unfamiliar setting." Common Sense Media called it a "Spirited novel that offers warts-and-all view of the Middle Ages" and wrote, "It draws readers into a rich, well-realized world where the trappings are fascinatingly old-fashioned, but the characters are universal and relatable."

The book received the following accolades:

- California Book Award for Juvenile (Silver) (1994)
- Newbery Medal Honor (1995)
- Golden Kite Award (1995)
- Dorothy Canfield Fisher Children's Book Award Nominee (1996)
- Premi Protagonista Jove for Category 16–17 years (1999)

== Film adaptation ==
It was announced in February 2021 that Lena Dunham would write and direct a film based on the book for Working Title Films. The adaptation was then acquired by Amazon Studios.
