= List of The League of Gentlemen characters =

This article contains a list of the characters featured in media by the British comedy troupe known as The League of Gentlemen. All of the characters were created by the troupe, who are Jeremy Dyson, Mark Gatiss, Steve Pemberton and Reece Shearsmith.

== Appearances ==
Character	Seasons			
Character	1	2 (Note: The Christmas Special is included under Season 2.)	3	Anniversary Specials
Recurring characters
Ally Welles	Recurring	Recurring		Guest
Barbara Dixon	Recurring	Recurring	Recurring	Guest
Benjamin Denton	Recurring	Recurring		Recurring
Bernice Woodall	Recurring	Recurring	Guest	Recurring
Brian Morgan	Recurring	Recurring	Guest	Guest
Charlie Hull	Recurring	Recurring	Recurring	Guest
Edward Tattsyrup	Recurring	Recurring	Guest	Recurring
Ernest Foot	Recurring		Guest	
Geoff Tipps	Recurring	Recurring	Recurring	Recurring
Harvey Denton	Recurring	Recurring		Recurring
Henry Portrait	Recurring	Recurring		Guest
Hilary Briss	Recurring	Recurring		
Iris Krell	Recurring	Recurring	Guest (Note: Voice-only appearance in Season 3.)	Guest
Jed Tinsel	Recurring			
Judee Levinson	Recurring	Recurring	Guest	
Les McQueen	Recurring	Recurring	Guest	Guest
Maurice Evans	Recurring	Recurring		
Matthew Chinnery	Recurring	Recurring		Recurring
Mickey M. Michaels	Recurring	Recurring	Recurring	Recurring
Mike Harris	Recurring	Recurring	Recurring	Recurring
Pauline Campbell-Jones	Recurring	Recurring	Recurring	Guest
Ross Gaines	Recurring	Recurring	Recurring	Guest
Sam Chignell	Recurring	Recurring		
Stella Hull	Recurring	Recurring	Guest	Guest
Tubbs Tattsyrup	Recurring	Recurring	Guest	Recurring
Val Denton	Recurring	Recurring		Recurring
Al	Guest	Recurring		Recurring
Dave Parkes	Guest	Guest	Guest	Guest
Lance Longthorne	Guest		Recurring	
Ollie Plimsols	Guest	Guest	Guest	Guest
Phil Proctor	Guest	Guest	Guest	Guest
Pop	Guest	Recurring	Guest	Recurring
Herr Lipp		Recurring		Guest
Mike King		Recurring	Recurring	
Murray Mint		Recurring		Recurring
Pamela Doove		Recurring	Guest (Note: Voice-only appearance in Anniversary Specials.)	Guest
Papa Lazarou		Recurring	Recurring	Guest
Reenie Calver		Recurring	Guest	
Vinnie Wythenshawe		Recurring	Guest	
Alvin Steele		Guest	Recurring	

	Local shop	Dentons	Job centre	Plastics	Butchers	Hulls	Charity shop	Creme Brulée	Foots	Debt collectors	Legz Akimbo	Misc.	Misc.	Misc.	Misc.	Misc.	Misc.
Shearsmith	Edward	Benjamin	Ross	Geoff	Samuel	Stella	Vinnie	Patch	Peter	Lisgoe	Ollie	Bernice	Papa Lazarou	Judee	Pamela	Henry Portrait	Mike King
Pemberton	Tubbs	Harvey	Pauline	Mike	Maurice	Charlie	Reenie	Bob	Ernest	Barry	Dave	Herr Lipp	Barbara	Pop	Farmer Jed	Ally Welles	Mechanic
Gatiss	David	Val	Mickey	Brian	Hilary	Tony	Customer	Les McQueen	Sheila	Glen	Phil	Mr. Chinnery	Mama Lazarou	Iris	Lance	Alvin Steele	Mick McNamara

== Edward and Tubbs ==
Edward and Tulip "Tubbs" Tattsyrup, played by Reece Shearsmith and Steve Pemberton respectively, are a married sibling couple who are the proprietors of Royston Vasey's local shop, which they inherited from their mother and has apparently been in the Tattsyrup family for generations, located on the top of a hill some distance away from the town. Both have distinctly pig noses. In live shows, the actors hold their noses up with tape. Despite being complete outsiders to most of the other action in the show, they have become, arguably, the most popular and identifiable characters.

Edward, who claims to have served in the armed forces and had been in "a war", presumably Oman or the Falklands, has a distrust of outsiders and is likely to emerge from the back of the shop saying "Hello, hello? What's going on? What's all this shouting? We'll have no trouble here!", regardless of whether or not any shouting is actually going on. He challenges people with the question, "Are you local?", dismissing those who reply "no" with, "This is a local shop, for local people; there's nothing for you here" – one of the show's best-known catchphrases.

Tubbs, real name Tulip, though also scared of newcomers, dreams of visiting the "bright lights" of towns and cities, usually Swansea, but also places such as London and Plymouth, whose existence Edward has tried to keep from her ("There is a Swansea!"). She tends to ask "Are you local?" with both hope and fear mixed in her voice, but is afraid that visitors may take her "precious things" from the shelves of the shop, in particular, the snow globes on the counter. Tubbs has a childlike innocence which is only guided towards malevolent ends by Edward's influence.

Edward and Tubbs have a son, David, who was a mild-mannered civil engineer responsible for building a new road threatening to link Royston Vasey to the outside world. After they reunite at the end of Series 1, his parents keep him locked up in the attic, where he develops a bestial nature. During Series 2 they attempt to kidnap a wife for him. In the end the unwitting victim is Barbara (see below).

The couple are serial killers, responsible for a large number of murders in the area. Some of these occurred when trying to kidnap friends and a wife for David ("be careful, Tubbs...we don't want her to suffocate like the other three"); and with the intention of stopping the building of "New Road". Others seem to be simply for their gratification. For example, they kill a backpacker and the investigating police officer after Tubbs gives the game away - she yells out "We didn't burn him!".

At the start of Series 3, they are seen to have survived the fire set by the inhabitants of Royston Vasey at the end of Series 2. They are wrongly suspected of starting the nosebleed epidemic, which is ironic given the countless murders they actually are responsible for. They decide to follow "New Road" and contemplate beginning a new life with a new shop in London. Edward's glasses were broken in the fire leaving him unable to see properly, so Tubbs, using one of the snow globes as a map, leads them along a railway line, and it appears that they are both promptly killed by a speeding train.

In the final shot of Series 3 we see a brief glimpse of their grandchildren in Barbara's arms. They have the same pig noses as Edward and Tubbs.

The pair appear in the live show as their ghosts, although this is set in a continuity outside of the main series, much like the film, where they appear briefly and accidentally kill Jeremy Dyson.

In the 2017 specials, the pair re-appear as squatters in a flat in Royston Vasey, having avoided the speeding train by inches and narrowly survived. Their flat, number 9, in homage to Shearsmith and Pemberton's other creation, Inside No. 9, is investigated by a local council worker and an investigative journalist, who they both promptly capture and keep as hostages. Tubbs becomes addicted to one of their smartphones and is amazed by its new technology, whilst Edward negotiates the hostages' release through negotiator Gareth Chapman (David Morrissey), after they find out that Royston Vasey is under threat of being erased due to the local boundary changes.

Edward eventually talks by phone to the Prime Minister, who cancels the changes, leaving Tubbs and Edward to face the press. Their fame is short-lived when Chapman discovers that both hostages have had their faces cut off by the Tattsyrups. The couple go on the run from the police and Tubbs hides in a photo booth, which leads to Papa Lazarou's wife mine, leaving Edward to wonder about where she disappeared.

The couple's piggy noses may have something to do with the family's bestiality towards pigs. meaning that the reason for their strange noses are genetic. This is implied in the second episode of the first series where Tubbs is shown breast-feeding a piglet. The noses, and Edward's appearance in particular, may also be indicative of congenital syphilis.

Their ages are unknown with certainty. The Series 1 DVD biographies claim that Edward is 84 years old and Tubbs is 33, which is almost impossible given they share the same mother and have an adult son. The audio commentaries note a time in the 16th century when Tubbs betrayed Edward and that the couple got married in the 14th century, making them both over 700 years old.

== Barbara Dixon ==
The trans woman Barbara Dixon (voiced by Pemberton) is the proprietor of the local taxi firm, Bab's Cabs, and likes to regale passengers with graphic descriptions of her upcoming operation. She has a deep voice and a necklace with her name on it nestling in among her chest hair. Her face is briefly seen in Series 1 episode 6. At the end of Series 1 her operation is botched by substitute surgeon Mr. Chinnery (see below), with the result that in Series 2 Barbara cannot tell what sex she is any more.

To further confuse matters, Barbara is seen heavily pregnant in Series 3, and gives birth to twins strongly resembling Tubbs and Edward. Barbara was briefly married to the Tattsyrups' son, David. Their marriage was short-lived as angry townsfolk set fire to the Local Shop on their wedding night, killing David in the blaze. Despite the fact that she was kidnapped for the marriage, she genuinely fell in love with David and was grief-stricken when he died. She re-appears in the 2017 specials, claiming she has moved with the times and being disparaging about anyone using masculine and feminine pronouns.

In the radio series, Barbara joins a dating agency, and gets romantically linked with Mr. Ingleby, who funds the last part of her operation.

== The Dentons ==
Harvey Denton (Pemberton) and his wife Val (Gatiss) are a bizarre couple whose gaudy 1970s-style house is run in an insanely ordered manner. For examples, they have two rolls of toilet paper labelled "1s" and "2s," and colour-coded towels for every purpose, from hands and spills to pubic hair. They have identical twin daughters, Chloe and Radclyffe, played by twins Megan de Wolf and Rosy de Wolf respectively. With their long white dresses and their habits of turning up unexpectedly and speaking in unison, they are obvious references to the two girls in The Shining. Harvey's dream in life is to have a self-lowering toilet seat. Val's wish is to have a son.

Into this formula, their completely normal nephew Benjamin (Shearsmith) is interjected. Harvey and Val tell him to make himself at home which is obviously impossible. Harvey is obsessed with male masturbation, forever accusing Benjamin of masturbating, using an array of amusing euphemisms.

Harvey is deeply fascinated by toads and has had the basement converted into a special chamber for keeping his huge collection. He is not so fond of frogs, refusing to allow the use of "The "F" word" in his home.

He also owns a toad known to the Mapapa tribe of the Shakiti Hills as "the devil's toad". "If one were to squeeze its little yellow belly, one's heart's desire would be granted." With him and his wife, Val, that turned out to be true. He wished for a self-lowering toilet seat, while Val asked for her nephew, Benjamin, to return. Both wishes come true. Benjamin also made the mistake of killing two of Harvey's favourite toads, Sonny and Cher, named after the musical duo, by frying one on an electric heater and stepping on the other.

The Dentons have a "nude day," which they claim is the first Monday of every month. They cast aside all clothing and go about their daily duties—including going to the supermarket, the newsagents, and the post office—totally naked. When Benjamin walks in on them naked, they force him to strip off as well and answer the door naked. Benjamin surprises the caller and brings him back to the living room, where Harvey and Val are dressed, and Benjamin is humiliated.

As Series 1 progresses, it becomes clear that the pair, especially Val, whose greatest wish is to have a son, do not want Benjamin to leave. In the first series, they merely used diversionary tactics, such as telling him that all guests must babysit their daughters. In Series 2 their plans become more sinister: they lock Benjamin in his room, type up a letter made to look as if it was from Benjamin declaring that he wishes to stay with the Dentons, and construct a large chamber in the basement where they intend to keep him as a pet.

Harvey even publishes a pamphlet entitled "My Plan to Keep Benjamin Locked Up as Some Kind of Pet, by Harvey Denton"; even Val is repulsed. Benjamin discovers this plan and turns the table on Harvey and Val, trapping them in the chamber and forcing them to confess, before Chloe and Radclyffe chase him off with a shotgun. Rather than free their parents, they lock them in.

Though they are never expressly killed off, this is the last time Harvey and Val appear. The final shot of the couple is Harvey mouthing "I can't breathe!". They were not featured in Series 3 or the film. One of their previous routines appears in the live show and in the Christmas Special. Val is seen as head of "Solutions Inc.", though this may not be real, given that it took place in Charlie's dream. A relative identical to Harvey is briefly seen on the streets of Royston Vasey in the Victorian era, shaking a collection tin in a suggestive manner. Their absence is unusual for such important and frequently used characters.

As of the 2017 specials, Harvey has died due to unknown circumstances. Val has invited Benjamin to stay for the funeral, only to arrive to the home in disarray. The twins have now grown up and are glad to have new company in the house, and they bake a special cake for Benjamin which is laced with drugs from a toad that induces hallucinations. Benjamin is drugged and entered into a ritual by Val and the twins to resurrect Harvey, whose corpse is kept preserved in the basement.

The ritual is a success and Harvey returns within Benjamin's body. Much to the dismay of Val and the twins, Harvey goes on a cleanliness rampage, which prompts Val to encourage Benjamin to expel the spirit of Harvey via a toad that he earlier swallowed during the ritual. Benjamin succeeds and Val later escorts Benjamin to the train station and invites him to come visit again.

=== Benjamin Denton ===
The first character to be introduced, Benjamin is the only permanent non-local character. To illustrate his normality, Shearsmith wears no makeup of any kind in his portrayal of Benjamin. He is also an important character in some of the major storylines. Originally, he stopped at the Dentons' to stay the night before embarking on a hiking trip with a friend. His friend was murdered by Tubbs and Edward. Tubbs now permanently wears the friend's walking boots.

At the end of Series 1, he attempts to escape from Royston Vasey and is last seen entering Tubbs and Edward's shop. After some time missing, he returns at the start of Series 2, dressed in a grass skirt and coconut bra, covered in mud, and collapsing, uttering the word "local" as the camera zooms in on the snow globe he was carrying.

Though he cannot remember where he has been, he has a snow globe taken from the Local Shop. It is implied that Tubbs and Edward had attempted to keep Benjamin as a friend (or, based on how he is dressed, a wife) for David. Taking advantage of Benjamin's lacklustre state, the Dentons plan to keep him as a pet, although this is foiled when he recovers to a reasonable extent. After escaping the Denton's home, Benjamin is surprised to find that Royston Vasey has descended into anarchy as a result of the nosebleed epidemic.

At this point, he finds the snow globe in his pocket and remembers his experiences in the Local Shop and leads an angry mob there. The rioters wrongly interpret this to mean that Tubbs and Edward are responsible for the epidemic, and only when they begin to burn down the local shop in the final scenes of Series 2 does Benjamin realise his mistake. He does not appear in Series 3, presumably having escaped Royston Vasey at the end of Series 2.

Ben returns to Royston Vasey in the 2017 specials to attend the funeral of Harvey. He is drugged by Val and the twins and forced into a ritual to become a host for the spirit of Harvey. The ritual is a success, but Val encourages Benjamin to expel the spirit of Harvey. Benjamin succeeds and Val escorts him to the train station and invites him to visit again.

== Hilary Briss ==
Briss, played by Gatiss, is a butcher and proprietor of Hilary Briss and Son, Royston Vasey's local butchers. His wares include a secret "special stuff", a mysterious and highly addictive ingredient which, it is implied, is both illegal and hideously immoral. Many authority figures are "in" on Briss's activities, including Police Inspector Cox, Magistrate Maurice Evans (Pemberton) and Councillor Samuel Chignell (Shearsmith), all of whom become hopelessly addicted.

Though Briss only sells his "special stuff" to a select group of gentlemen customers, in Series 2 addiction to the "special stuff" leads to a haemorrhagic epidemic, marked by chronic nosebleeds. This results in the death of many local residents, including the mayor. The "special stuff" has reached a wider market through Evans' wife Eunice, who serves it at her sandwich stall. She has gained access to the "special stuff" through Maurice, who has managed to get his whole family addicted. The pure dose of "special stuff" which Briss serves was substantially less harmful, but Eunice cut the substance with her own paste, making it poisonous.

Before he can be caught, Briss escapes to the Caribbean, where he continues selling his "special stuff", this time in burgers, leaving behind his wife, who it turns out is a brown cow. Eunice is arrested along with Inspector Cox, while Sam and Maurice are last seen being caught by the authorities, with nosebleeds, burning evidence of the "special stuff". Maurice is known to have survived as he is mentioned by Eunice in Series 3, but it is unknown if Sam has also survived. In Series 3 Briss's shop is seen to be boarded up, with graffiti reading 'murderer' painted across the front.

Briss does not appear in Series 3, though a newspaper story indicates his antics have continued abroad in much the same way as before. In the film The League of Gentlemen's Apocalypse, he returns, clad in handcuffs, and being chased by the police across the moors. Whereas in the first two series, Briss is a fairly one-dimensional villain, in the film, he is fleshed out into the antihero of the piece, before being killed by Dr Erasmus Pea, the film's parody of occultist John Dee. This may be why, despite the film being set in a "bubble", he does not appear in the 2017 specials. He appears in The League of Gentlemen Live Again! in 2019 as the man who "rescues" the captive "wives" from Papa Lazarou's underground mine.

Though it is never revealed what "special stuff" consists of, many have assumed that it is human meat. The writers have denied this, stating that they can think of "nothing more mundane than cannibalism", and indicating that it is something much worse, while also claiming it is possible to determine its identity from clues in the series. The Series 1 DVD includes a fragment of brainstorming materials in its bonus section, on which the idea of the butcher selling human appendixes obtained from the local hospital is listed.

One of the most popular theories is that it is sausages laced with cocaine, after tying together possible clues throughout Series 1 and 2, including references to Goodfellas and Midnight Express, the nosebleeds, and the substance becoming more dangerous after being cut. Even the writers were apparently not sure what the special stuff was at the beginning of the series. When Briss takes Maurice along with him to receive a "special delivery" in a remote woodland, we see who supplies Briss with the special stuff: a tall ominous man accompanied by a short hunchbacked figure. It is evident that even Briss is terrified of them.

The only clue from the original live shows as to what the substance is that it apparently rhymes with "drawstring", which has led some to believe that the "special stuff" is circumcised foreskins. "Bris" is also the Yiddish name for the Brit milah, the Jewish circumcision ceremony. Some fans have combined the two theories and believe that the "special stuff" is sausages containing cocaine enclosed by foreskin sausage casing.

According to the character biography in Series 1, Briss says that his age "spans great oceans of time". It is not known what he means by this.

== Mr Chinnery ==
A cheerful and disarming man, Mr Matthew Chinnery (Gatiss) is the accident-prone local veterinarian (not "Dr Chinnery", as he is a veterinary surgeon). Most of the animals he treats end up dying, including a pregnant cow whose insides were mangled when he attempted to help the calf but put his hand up the wrong passage while a group of schoolchildren looked on, a sheepdog whom he mistakenly euthanised while the owner was out of the room fetching the actual patient, and a tortoise he blasted out of its shell while attempting to give it oxygen. He was also responsible for botching Barbara's operation. As a result of his many accidents, he gets increasingly upset.

In the Christmas Special, Mr Chinnery, who fears that he is on the verge of losing his sanity, told Bernice the story of how his great-grandfather Edmund Chinnery, the foremost vet of his time, was cursed to have any animal he touched "meet a dreadful end" and that his descendants would carry the curse after him. Bernice reassured him that there was "no such thing as curses" and that he, the doctor who first had the curse and his ancestor had had accidents similar to the curse primarily because they were scared of the curse and thought that they had it. She then told him to go and do his next job without any fear of the curse. He does not appear at all in Series 3, but does make an appearance in the film, The League of Gentlemen's Apocalypse, treating a giraffe and having a role in the film's climax. In the live show, he stands in for a magician and gives a new twist to the trick of pulling a rabbit out of a hat. He also re-appears in the 2017 specials treating a hedgehog and causing the death of a stray cat, his curse therefore never being lifted.

Many of Chinnery's disasters are parodies of scenes from the BBC's All Creatures Great and Small. Mark Gatiss's performance is reminiscent of Peter Davison, who played Tristan Farnon on that programme (Gatiss is also a famous fan of Doctor Who, in which Davison played the title character for three years). The name "Chinnery" almost certainly comes from actor Dennis Chinnery, who played three separate characters in Doctor Who. Coincidentally, Christopher Eccleston, the ninth Doctor, appeared in the League of Gentlemen as the owner of a cat theatre, set up in direct competition to Kenny Harris's Dog Cinema – Kenny Harris also played by Mark Gatiss. Mark Gatiss was also in an episode of Doctor Who called "The Lazarus Experiment". The wig that he wore playing Professor Richard Lazarus in this episode was the same wig which was used for Mr. Chinnery in The League of Gentlemen.

== Job Centre ==
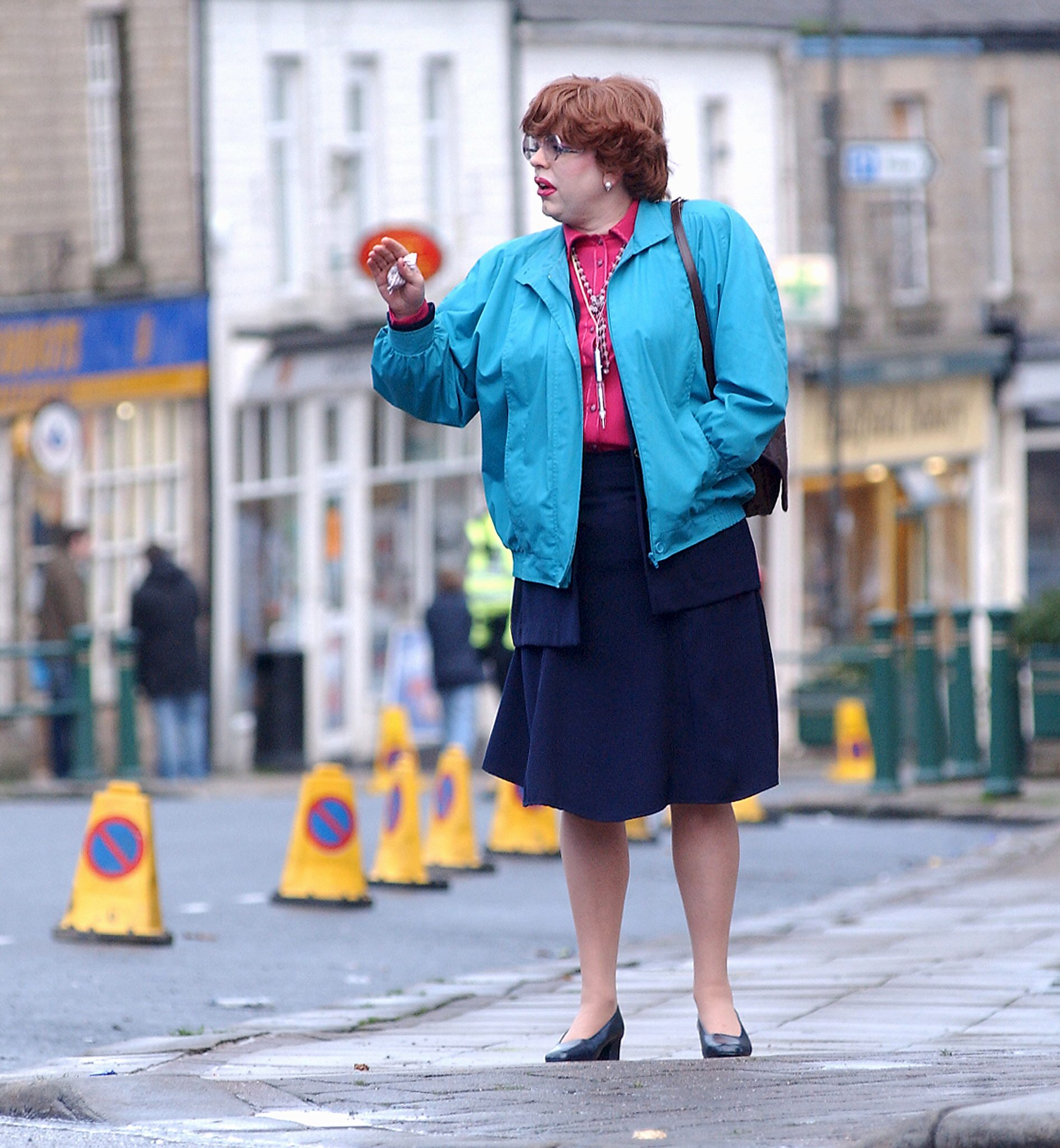
Steve Pemberton in character as Pauline Campbell-Jones

Pauline Campbell-Jones (Pemberton) is a Restart officer in charge of leading mandatory (and exceedingly condescending) Restart courses which the chronically unemployed are compelled to attend. Pauline makes no secret of her contempt for the "dole scum" who attend her course at Royston Vasey's Jobcentre, and her eventual humiliation at joining their sorry ranks is too much for her to bear. Pauline has an unusual obsession with pens (she has a tendency to bring one out whenever someone needs one) and has a startling similarity to Deirdre Barlow from Coronation Street (a fact commented on by Ross). Her catchphrase is "hokey-cokey, pig in a pokey!" which she says when she enters the classroom where her Restart courses take place. Pauline was accused by Cathy Carter-Smith of being a "psychotic 50-year-old lesbian", to which she responds "How Dare You! I'm 48!" Her star sign is Virgo. She has a framed photograph of herself and another woman naked, who was named on the commentary of the Series 2 DVD as a former lover of Pauline's named Terri Makepeace. In the commentary of the Series 1 DVD when asked whether she is in a relationship, Pauline says, rather sadly, "There was someone once", and the commentary also names that person as Terri Makepeace. When asked about her family, she claims that they are all dead.

Mickey and Ross are two of the people taking the Restart course. Mickey M. Michaels (Gatiss), a well-meaning simpleton who wants to be a fireman, grows increasingly close to Pauline throughout the series – Pauline has developed the nickname "Mickey Luv" for him. Ross Gaines (Shearsmith) is considerably more intelligent than Pauline and always tries to embarrass her when asked to perform tasks to the rest of the class. However, Pauline usually resorts to violence to secure the upper hand. Ross seems officious and does not appear to have any close friends or family – when Pauline once flicked through his address book it was empty apart from "Work" and "Mother". The course is also attended by a man named Colin.

At the end of Series 1, Ross reveals that he is an undercover agent who has been inspecting Pauline. Naturally, he fires her, forcing her to sit the Restart course which, in Series 2, is now being led by Cathy Carter-Smith (Shearsmith), who is just as bad as, if not worse than, Pauline. After Mickey stands up for her, she leaves the class and briefly works with him at the Burger Me fast-food restaurant but is fired when she spoils Ross's veggie burger in revenge. In an act of desperation Pauline, with the help of Mickey, takes Ross hostage in the Jobcentre and demands her job back. However, they are not noticed, partly due to the epidemic and partly due to the fact that no one realises Ross is missing. Ross eventually tricks Mickey and escapes, returning later to have Pauline arrested. As an interesting side note, moments before she is arrested, Pauline is about to take a bite from a sandwich which she had just bought from Eunice Evans' stall. When she sees Ross with a police officer, she drops the sandwich in surprise. Presumably, had she eaten the sandwich she would have been poisoned.

In Series 3, Pauline is serving time at HM Prison Clitclink alongside Eunice Evans, nicknamed "The Royston Poisoner," whom she bullies and extorts pens from for temporary possession of "The Exocet", an item featured later in Lance's joke shop. She is given early release when she strikes a deal with Ross to discover how Mickey's family has been cheating the employment system. However, she feels guilty for her involvement and she and Mickey sleep together and become engaged, cementing their love for each other. Mickey was dressed as a woman at the time and he asks Pauline if that was the reason she had sex with him, but she tells him it was not. Pauline then has sex with Ross to make sure he does not tell Mickey about their deal (although it is also implied she has actually been attracted to him all this time — these two liaisons and subsequent marriage suggest Pauline is bisexual), but he decides to tell him anyway. He claims that he is doing this because "you made me hate my job!" Pauline runs to get to Mickey before Ross exposes her, and is nearly hit by the speeding Legz Akimbo van (driven by Geoff) before being saved by Lance, who sacrifices his life to save hers. She and Mickey get married, and even Ross applauds the happy couple.

In the 2017 specials, Pauline appears to have regained her position in the job centre, and a familiar scene is played out with Mickey, Ross and other job seekers. Eventually, it is revealed that the setting is a care home and Pauline has dementia; Mickey and Ross are helping Pauline to regain her memories. They succeed; however, Pauline is soon murdered accidentally by Geoff in a mistaken identity murder after he mistook her for Mike's morbidly obese wife Cheryl (whom Mike had ordered him to kill), although her body is not shown. Mickey, who has finally acquired his dream position of a fireman, is last seen distraught over her death.

In the live show, there is a "Who Shot Pauline?" saga, featuring Ross, Mickey, and Cathy Carter-Smith as suspects.

== Geoff, Mike, and Brian ==
Geoffrey "Geoff" Tipps (Shearsmith), Mike Harris (Pemberton), and Brian Morgan (Gatiss) all work at the local plastics injection-moulding company (in the original radio series, this was a nuclear power plant). Mike is the most normal of the trio (like Shearsmith's portrayal of Benjamin Denton, Mike is portrayed by Pemberton with no added makeup), whilst Brian is slightly less intelligent, though still a good friend. Geoff is rather more tactless and distasteful, always aiming to perfect his comic timing with a series of ill-formed jokes. The three getting together always results in Geoff exploding in a fit of rage, often brandishing a gun and exclaiming "You knew I had this gun, Brian!" In Series 2, en route to an away day training session, they become lost in the woods and turn to barbarism in a parody of Deliverance. The reason Mike and Brian remain friends with Geoff despite his outbursts remains a mystery until Mike's wedding, when it is revealed that Mike once had sex with Geoff's ex-wife, while Brian is now married to her.

In Series 3 Geoff travels to London to become an unsuccessful stand-up comedian after being sacked by Mike, only to be accused of terrorism and having to return to Royston Vasey as police are searching for him in London. On the way back, he swerves his stolen van into a garden wall and is horribly disfigured. He is finally seen a great deal happier (albeit with his face heavily bandaged) in hospital surrounded by his friends, including Mike and his wife Cheryl, regaling them successfully with his comedy routine. The fact that his face has been disfigured concludes his story in Series 3: the search for him was based on a facial description, so he is no longer in danger of being caught by the police.

Brian is mentioned early in Series 3; where Geoff claims a rumour is going around that he was "bummed by some binmen." He appears in person later, having quit his job to search for his missing wife Katie, but eventually both he and his wife are imprisoned inside circus animals — along with Reenie, Charlie, and Bernice — by Papa Lazarou. Neither Mike nor Brian appears in The League of Gentlemen's Apocalypse; Geoff, however, is an important character in it as he overcomes his anger and cowardice to emerge as the hero — despite shooting Mark Gatiss at the end of the film when he takes the safety catch off Herr Lipp's gun. His film character noticeably differs from his television persona: instead of being angry, bitter, and nearly psychotic, he is more of a bumbling yet kind-hearted underdog.

In the 2017 specials, the trio are reunited when Geoff, now working part-time at the local garden centre, pitches a Dragon's Den-style idea to Mike and Brian, the latter having escaped the circus elephant. While Brian rejects the idea, Mike offers Geoff the money to kill his wife Cheryl instead in a mercy killing, Cheryl having since become morbidly obese and unable to leave her bed. Though suffering some false starts, Geoff goes up the stairs and appears to succeed. He phones Mike to deliver the news, only to discover to Mike's horror that he has gone to the wrong house, Mike and Cheryl having moved to a bungalow four years earlier. It is revealed that the unwitting victim is Pauline, though it is possible Geoff may have bungled the operation since Pauline's body is never shown.

== Les McQueen ==
Les McQueen (Gatiss) is former rhythm-guitar player for 1970s glam rock band Crème Brûlée (and still has plenty of copies of two of their albums: Just Desserts and Another Helping). He now works in the hospital laundry, longing for the old days when he would "walk into a Royston Vasey urinal and heads would turn". He constantly bothers other aspiring musicians he meets, boring them with tales of a now outdated and unfashionable music era. When they politely (or in some cases impolitely) ask him to leave them alone, he does so, stating sadly (as if he is trying to convince himself of it, rather than convince whoever he is talking to): "It's a shit business; I'm glad I'm out of it."

McQueen is one of the more "normal" inhabitants of Royston Vasey (when compared to other much more bizarre characters such as Tubbs, Edward and Papa Lazarou), as well as one of the more tragic characters. In his final appearance in Series 2 he is conned out of his redundancy package (which he was going to use to open a bar abroad) by the lead singer of Crème Brûlée, in the hopes of reuniting the band. In the commentary on the DVD, the writers mention an alternative ending where the reunion actually happens, and the band is a success. He makes a brief cameo appearance in Series 3 as the MC for the Little Miss Elegance Beauty Pageant.

In the live version of the show, he is introduced as just having had a major resurgence in his career, with a big record contract and a promising solo career. When he walks on stage he dances to the music before approaching the microphone and is fatally electrocuted. This is followed up in the second live tour, whereby he is waiting to audition for the "Commu-nativity". He talks about his career to a hooded teenager next to him, who turns out to be the Grim Reaper, waiting to lead the deceased McQueen to his afterlife.

Les returns in the 2017 specials where he now runs a moderately successful and steady floor polishing business. He is shown at the house of Slim Tim (Shearsmith), a DJ and music producer who lives a wealthy lifestyle due to his success in the rave scene of the 1990s. He discovers that Les is actually famous in the (fictional) country of Herzlovakia and that the country's fans would welcome his return to the scene. After Tim offers to relaunch his career, Les, at first shocked and delighted at this discovery, eventually decides to decline the offer as his job is now dependable and he appears to have genuinely moved on from the past. However, in the final scenes, he is shown in full 1970s glam costume at the train station, having decided to pursue his dream and heading to Herzlovakia, thus giving one of the few League characters a genuine happy ending.

== Rev. Bernice Woodall ==
The local vicar, Bernice (Shearsmith) does not believe in God or the teachings of the Bible, constantly berates parishioners for their sins and appears to take a perverse pleasure in humiliating people in the confessional booth. In a BBC Radio 7 League of Gentlemen night, Reece Shearsmith revealed that the original incarnation of Bernice was based on This Morning 's agony aunt, Denise Robertson.

Her original role in the radio series was as the local DJ. In the live show, she acted as an agony aunt on her own show called Hours of Agony, supposedly attempting to comfort, but really just insulting, an obese woman.

In the Christmas Special it emerges that Bernice witnessed her mother being kidnapped when she was a child, perhaps explaining her cynical outlook on the world. She plays an important role in the Christmas Special, hearing the problems of some of the locals, all the while battling with her past. At first, she has no sympathy for the people who tell her about their troubles, but gains more sympathy when Mr Chinnery arrives to describe his problem. When she has helped him "cure" himself of the curse, she regains her faith and is preparing the church for the next day when the kidnapper suddenly returns for her, revealing himself as Papa Lazarou. He kidnaps her, declaring "You're my wife now."

A picture of her is seen on a missing persons flier posted on the church noticeboard at the start of Series 3, and at the end she is briefly spotted in Papa Lazarou's big tent – trapped inside an elephant with Brian, Charlie, and various other people. She also makes an appearance in the movie as the person who organises the attempts to save Royston Vasey and seems to have had some foresight in the coming destruction of the town.

She returns to Royston Vasey in the 2017 specials having escaped the elephant and become the new foul-mouthed mayor of the town. Now with Murray Mint, she seeks to prevent the town from being erased from existence due to the local boundary changes. Though she succeeds, she regrets the decision, as it is revealed that she bargained with Papa Lazarou to release her on the condition that fracking would go ahead underneath Royston Vasey to create a "wife mine" for him.

== Mrs Levinson and Iris Krell ==
Middle class Judee Levinson (Shearsmith) and her grotesque cleaning lady Iris Krell (Gatiss) who both have troubled private lives, indulge in a regular microcosm of the class struggle. Each taunts the other — Mrs Levinson with tales of her luxury lifestyle and Iris with lurid stories of her sex life — in a constant game of one-upmanship. The stories usually turn to personal insults about upsetting events in each other's lives with increasingly catastrophic revelations.

These stories usually involve their unseen husbands. Judee's husband, Eddie, is said to be "King of the Carpet Warehouses," but in the final episode of Series 2, it is revealed that he became bankrupt and died of a heart attack at 42. Iris's husband, Ron, is alive and well, but Judee believes him to be nothing more than a sex-hungry prehistoric animal. Iris tells Judee "He has me doing things that would make a whore blush!"

At the end of Series 2, Iris finally snaps back at Judee after all her insults. This causes Judee to break down in tears, and it is revealed that they are mother and daughter. The story goes that a teen Iris gave birth to Judee but they were soon separated. Many years later, Judee hired Iris as a cleaner, but upon discovering Iris was her mother, nothing changed between them. This is taken a step further in the live show, where it is suggested not only that both are cleaners who take it in turns to pretend to be their unseen employer, but that they are father and son who have been pretending to be women all along.

In Series 3, Judee has started up a beauty salon with Charlie Hull called "Spit and Polish". The customers believe her to be giving the massages, when it is in fact Charlie. During this time, Judee develops a crush on Charlie. When people start demanding "extras", Charlie struggles with homosexuality when he finds himself attracted to Tony, the man with whom his wife, Stella, has had an affair. When he confesses to giving "extras", Judee fires him and Stella takes the opportunity to leave him after her gambling addiction finally pays off. Iris, meanwhile, appears to have a brief cameo in Pop's strip club, where her body is seen dancing and Pop thanks a woman called Iris for her services. She is also heard on one of the massage tapes in the beauty salon, asking Judee if she wants a cup of tea.

Iris briefly re-appears in the 2017 specials using a photo booth and being sent underground to what is eventually revealed to be Papa Lazarou's "wife mine".

== Charlie and Stella Hull ==
Charlie (Pemberton) and Stella (Shearsmith) are a husband and wife with a tempestuous relationship. They have grown to hate each other and quarrel endlessly, using unwilling third parties as mediators. These include their daughter's boyfriend Tony (Gatiss), a waiter, and a baby. Their daughter, Julie, is never seen. In the second live show, it is revealed that Julie died ten years previously when she drowned in the bath when Stella went to check the lottery numbers instead of looking after her ("It was a Rollover..." Stella cries). Also in this live show, the warring couple appeared to reignite some degree of unity and compassion with Charlie agreeing that Stella could "still buy her [Julie] clothes!"

Often, when their argument reaches its climax, the third party they used to mediate will either voice their displeasure or otherwise just awkwardly leave. At this point, Charlie and Stella usually appear to forget their argument and start talking to each other normally. Throughout the sketches in Series 1 and 2, it is revealed that Stella has a gambling addiction, and that she has had sex with other men, including Tony.

In the Christmas Special, the story is taken a step further, with both Charlie and Stella speaking to each other directly for the first time during their argument. Charlie visits the Reverend Bernice about a dream he keeps having where he is going to enter a line-dancing competition on Boxing Day. Frustrated with his obsession over his new hobby, Stella seeks help from her friend Donna (Liza Tarbuck), through the form of a secret organisation called "Solutions, Inc." (which is run by Val Denton and includes other local females such as Pauline, Vinnie & Reenie, Judee & Iris, and Pam Doove, all of whom wear white masks). She gives them three items belonging to Charlie, which they use to form a voodoo doll of him, saying that they will let her know the price when the deed is done. During the line-dancing competition, Charlie does well until he falls (Val throws the doll to the ground) and cannot stop dancing (Pauline burns the doll's feet) and is forced to douse himself with beer (the women use water) to stop himself. He receives an extremely low score, effectively ruining his hobby and his confidence.

Later, on a snowy day, Stella is relaxing on a bench with Lee (Mark Gatiss), Donna's husband, with whom she has been having an affair. She tells Lee about her success with Solutions, Inc., but Lee claims he has never heard of the organisation despite the help they apparently provided his and Donna's relationship. Suddenly, blood gushes from his throat and he falls over dead. One of the "Solutions" members then appears and reveals herself to be Donna. She used Charlie's razor to slit Lee's doll's throat, saying that this is the price and begins shouting for the police to arrest Stella, having framed her for Lee's murder. Unfortunately, Bernice cynically believes his story to be nothing more than a "cheese dream" and kicks him out of her church; he cries as he wanders off into the night.

In Series 3, Charlie forms a partnership with Judee Levinson at the "Spit and Polish" beauty salon, where he is soon asked to give "extras" to customers (i.e. helping them masturbate). After he gives an "extra" to Tony (with whom Stella has had an affair), he struggles with homosexuality after suddenly developing feelings for Tony himself and even desiring to share Stella with Tony. When Tony goes on a date with Judee, Charlie confesses to have given the "extras." As a result, Tony is disgusted and assaults him, before Judee fires him and Stella announces she has won on the pools and is going on holiday without him. To top it all, his order at the restaurant has to be cancelled, as they are out of calamari. Depressed and rejected, he wanders to the Windermere B & B, but it is closed for a private function. He gets caught up in the accident involving Pauline, Lance, Geoff and the Legz Akimbo van before being kidnapped by Keith Drop (aka Papa Lazarou) and imprisoned inside an elephant (although in his final appearance he is shown to be happy, as Brian was now keeping him company).

By the time of the 2017 specials, Charlie has escaped the elephant and is now in a homosexual relationship with a man called Gordon (Gatiss), while Stella is with a man named Scott who has physically abused her, as she is shown with a black eye and in a wheelchair. Once again using Luigi as a go-between, the couple are shown to still love each other and care deeply about each other yet cannot seem to move on.

Charlie is usually seen wearing a Rotherham United replica home shirt from the 1996 season.

== Charity Shop Workers ==
Vinnie Wythenshaw and Reenie Calver are two old ladies (Shearsmith and Pemberton) obsessed with carrier bags and whether the toys people donate have the "special mark". They are disorganised and skittish and have a particular dislike for the "Spastic" charity shop and "that Merrill", an unseen co-worker who works when they are "ill" on Thursdays. Reenie has a hearing disorder meaning that she misinterprets practically everything Vinnie or a customer says. They berate customers for being rude, even though their rudeness is often acceptable given the difficulty they have in processing even the simplest task.

In Series 3, Vinnie is killed when she falls off her motorised mobility scooter onto a large spike, while chasing a red plastic bag that flew out of the charity shop window. This bag plays an important role in connecting all the storylines in Series 3. It has great significance in the motor accident at the end of each episode, which links all the stories into one larger narrative, as the accident is seen from differing character's viewpoints.

Her replacement turns out to be Keith Drop, whom Reenie befriends after losing her best friend. However, Keith reveals his true identity to be Papa Lazarou. Reenie and Brian follow him back to his house, attempting to find out what has happened to Brian's wife, but both are then kidnapped and imprisoned, Reenie inside a crocodile, Brian in an elephant. Whilst the charity shop is briefly shown, neither Vinnie nor Reenie appear in the 2017 specials.

Papa Lazarou has also been taking the possessions of his "wives" to sell at the charity shop. This is why Brian begins to suspect that "Keith", aka Papa Lazarou, knows something about his wife's disappearance when he finds a brooch, that she was wearing on the day she went missing, for sale in the shop.

== Henry Portrait and Ally Welles ==
Two scruffy teenagers played by Pemberton and Shearsmith, who consider themselves to be film experts, but will only watch a film if it has a sufficient number of "killings". Named after, respectively, Henry: Portrait of a Serial Killer and Leslie Halliwell. When not browsing the horror section at the local video rental shop or sitting in the cinema, they wandering the streets playing the game "Who would win out of..." in which they pair up famous film characters in hypothetical duels. They are shown in the 2017 specials trying and failing to flog pirate DVDs to youths of films that are several years old.

== Papa Lazarou ==
Reece Shearsmith as Papa Lazarou

Papa Lazarou (Shearsmith) is the blackfaced, light-fingered proprietor of a travelling circus and freak show, The Pandemonium Carnival. In the first episode of series 2, Lazarou brings his circus to Royston Vasey. He sells pegs and collects wives. He breaks into a woman's house, repeatedly asking for "Dave". "Hello Dave" and "Is Dave there?" have since become his catchphrases. He frightens her into giving him her wedding ring, before declaring "you're my wife now".. He fled the town when he realised that everyone in Royston Vasey was stranger than he was.

In series 3, he took on the disguise of Keith Drop at the Charity Shop, and demonstrated elaborate approaches for keeping his wives, and anyone who attempted to rescue them, inside of his circus animals.

Papa Lazarou is briefly shown in the 2017 specials as the owner of the underground mine lying underneath a photo booth in the high street of Royston Vasey, where unsuspecting female victims go to take photos and get sent down a chute. When Tubbs is captured, she asks what the place is, to which Lazarou responds with a variation of one of his catchphrases: "It's a wife mine now!". He also featured in the Christmas special and The League of Gentlemen's Apocalypse.

When disguised as Keith in the third series, part of Papa Lazarou's flesh-coloured make-up was scratched off, revealing his familiar black and white colouration beneath. In his film appearance, he coughs up a hairball composed of his own black curly hair. Papa Lazarou does not seem to age. In the Christmas Special when he kidnaps Bernice's mother, he looks the same age as he does in the series.

According to interviews with Reece Shearsmith and Steve Pemberton broadcast on the BBC, Papa Lazarou is based on Peter Papalazarou, one of their past landlords. Many of Papa Lazarou's catchphrases are based on the telephone conversations that Reece used to have with Papalazarou, including an insistence on speaking to Steve, which generated the "Hello, Dave?" and "Is Dave there?" catchphrases.

Papa Lazarou has been listed as both the 8th and 14th most popular sketch of all time with British audiences, according to the Radio Times and Channel 4, respectively. In June 2020, during the George Floyd protests, The League of Gentlemen was withdrawn from distribution on Netflix due to the character's makeup resembling blackface.

== Herr Lipp ==
Herr Wolf Lipp (Pemberton) is a gay German teacher from Duisburg, who visits Royston Vasey leading a tour group of German students. He becomes obsessed with Justin Smart (Blake Ritson), a boy with whom he is staying. Justin's mother comes down with a nosebleed during the epidemic, leaving Lipp more time to spend with him. He has not quite mastered the English language, so he often makes mistakes which come out as double entendres.

He has been visiting Britain every year for over a decade, and has presumably come into contact with many schoolboys like Justin. In the penultimate episode of Series 2, he struggles to express his feelings for Justin before ending up throwing some drug-laced coffee in his face, causing him to collapse. When Lipp says goodbye to Mrs Smart, who survives the epidemic, having only been a "carrier", it is revealed that he and his wife, Lotte (Gatiss), buried Justin alive, with only a snorkel to breathe through. He leaves saying "See you next year, Justin! Tschüß!" before stroking the snorkel.

In the Christmas Special, a man named Matthew Parker (Shearsmith) reveals how, in 1975, he was part of an exchange programme and stayed with the Lipps, where Lipp conducted a boys' church choir while Lotte played the organ. He gradually comes to believe that Lipp is a vampire. When Lipp attempts to make advances on him, he misinterprets them as Lipp's attempts to make him into a vampire. In the end it is revealed that Lotte is a vampire, as well as the choirboys, whom she turned into vampires because the couple could not have children. Matthew flees the church, but the choirboys appear to consume Lipp before he can escape. He does not appear in Series 3.

In The League of Gentlemen's Apocalypse he appears as a much more sympathetic character than before. He discovers that he is a character in the programme and disguises himself as his creator, Steve Pemberton, blending in at home and treating his wife and children far better than the real Pemberton appears to. He becomes upset at his status as a one-joke character, feeling it better for him to die than to carry on without Free Will, threatening to shoot Mark Gatiss with a flintlock pistol during the film's climax. He is convinced by Geoff to hand over the gun. Geoff subsequently accidentally shoots Gatiss dead. He is last seen looking after some children seeking their parents after the apocalypse.

In the live show, he is allowed some audience participation by playing "Blind Man's Poof" with an unfortunate young man.

He is shown revisiting Royston Vasey in the 2017 specials, remarking that he wishes to "dig up some old friends", presumably meaning Justin, and watching a game of boys' football.

== Legz Akimbo ==
Legz Akimbo (Oliver Plimsoles, Dave Parkes, Phil Proctor) is a particularly earnest travelling theatre company. Ollie (Shearsmith) is the leader of the troupe. He writes, directs and produces all the work. He is still trying to cope with his discovery of his wife's lesbianism.

Phil (Gatiss) is gay. Dave (Pemberton) and Ollie are jealous of Phil's ability to get film and television roles. Both Phil and Dave hate Ollie. They drive in their van, nicknamed "Bessie", a possible homage to the car driven in Doctor Who, of which Gatiss is a longtime fan. Their troupe's slogan is "Legz Akimbo – Put Yourself in a Child!"

Gatiss' character, Phil Proctor, is no doubt named for Philip Proctor, a voice actor and longtime member of the radio comedy troupe, The Firesign Theatre, pioneers in the sort of bizarre, dense character comedy that the League explores.

In the first series, during a production of Everybody Out!, a play about homosexuality, at the local school in Royston Vasey, Phil is leaving the group at the end of the month as he has been "plucked for stardom" – a fact that Dave and Ollie put down to his homosexuality. By the end of the episode, Dave reveals that he is also leaving the group, leaving Ollie exasperated.

In Series 2, they are both back inexplicably, performing in a new play about homeless people called No Home 4 Johnny. They are seen trying to calm the homeless at the town hall during the nosebleed epidemic, but instead it triggers an angry mob to confront Mayor Vaughan and, eventually, Tubbs and Edward.

In Series 3, they have again reunited and are working on their latest play, Vegetable Soup, about the disabled, in the "Salmon of Knowledge" comedy club in London run by Geoff's old friend, Don Lynch (Gatiss). Ollie insists on trying out "extended improv" – meaning that Dave must order a cake from a bakery whilst pretending he is "deafblind", while Phil sits in a wheelchair. Phil pretends to lie on the pavement. When a man spots him, he complains to Ollie, whose rude behaviour ends up in him being assaulted. Later, Ollie, now himself in a wheelchair from his injuries, witnesses Geoff stealing the Legz Akimbo van and heading back to Royston Vasey.

They play an important connecting role in the second live tour, organising a "Commu-nativity" for the inhabitants of Royston Vasey.

Ollie's supposed email address was printed in the tour programme. One fan, after sending an email and discovering the address did not exist, decided to set up the account in his own name, thereafter acting as Ollie on the dedicated forums and MSN Messenger. This mystery lasted for a short while until his identity was revealed as being a fan, with the "real" Ollie (Shearsmith) having no affiliation with it, although it was referenced in a blog on the official website.

In the 2017 specials, Ollie has a dream where he has won an award for the production of one of his shows. In reality, he is a teacher of a Year 9 secondary school drama class. The students reveal that Phil and Dave have returned, and they and the students want him to perform one of his plays for them, which he does. However, this is also a dream. He is eventually shown to be stuck in his dead-end teacher job, where he has no respect from any of the students.

== Additional characters ==
- Ernest Foot (Pemberton), a widower who tries to be politically correct but always puts his foot in it. In Series 3, his brother Peter (Shearsmith) rehearses his funeral every weekend, long after his family has had enough; to get revenge, Ernest reveals his plans to marry Sheila (Gatiss), Peter's wife, by rehearsing at the time of Peter's funeral rehearsal and pretending he is already dead.
- Dr Ira Carlton (Pemberton) is the unsympathetic GP in Royston Vasey. If a patient's illness cannot be remedied by pills or medicines from a chemist, he refuses to treat them unless they buy his time by playing party games at his house. He has a habit of crunching Polo mints without sucking them. Dr Carlton is emphatic with his patients that "we'll do things PROPERLY". One of his patients is the tearful Mrs Beasley (Gatiss), who also visits the Charity Shop in Series 2. If the patients appear to demonstrate traits often ascribed to hypochondriacs, he orders them to "go out would you!".
- Olive Kilshaw (Shearsmith), who works for the Attachments Dating Agency. She is a condescending and arrogant woman who regularly and openly ridicules the clients of the agency who trust her to find them partners. She has a boyfriend of her own that she did not meet at the agency and tries to "help" Iain Cashmore (Pemberton), a man lacking self-confidence, to find a date in Series 2, despite taunting him about his appearance and inability to find a girlfriend.
- Pamela Doove (Shearsmith), a woman trying to be an actress. She cannot say a single easy line without putting on an unusual accent of which she is unaware and mispronouncing most of the words. She auditions for an orange juice commercial directed by Jed Hunter (Pemberton) in Series 2, but, instead of "Excuse me, has anyone got a bottle of orange juice," says (or rather shouts), "Eskeewd beef! Have anybody got any bokkle oran doove?" She inexplicably wins the part; the commercial goes on to become a widespread success. Pam later performs as a Nazi in Keith Drop's local production of The Diary of Anne Frank in Series 3. Jed also witnesses Geoff's appalling stand-up comedy in London in Series 3. Pamela is seen in the Christmas Special as part of "Solutions, Inc."; she asks for a bottle of orange juice in addition to the three items Stella needs to collect, and Val dismisses her. In the live shows, she attempts more auditions. In The League of Gentlemen Live at Dury Lane she auditions for a Shakespearian production, where she characteristically mangles Portia's "Quality of Mercy" speech from The Merchant of Venice. In The League of Gentlemen Are Behind You she auditions for Legz Akimbo's production of "Commu-nativity", in which she reads for the part of an angel. Asked to speak in tongues as part of the audition, she instead speaks perfectly normally in a quiet voice. In the 2017 specials, she is shown to now do the Shipping Forecast on BBC Radio 4.
- DJ Mike King (Shearsmith), the disc jockey at the local hospital. He plays a card game called "Go Johnny Go Go Go Go" (one of a series of card games he has made up) with two doctors, Mr Best (Pemberton) and Dr Simon (Gatiss), who are his childhood friends, in Series 2 and helps friend Lance get a new arm attached in Series 3. He is also seen as the DJ for the line-dancing competition in the Christmas Special attended by the Hulls.
- Owen Fallowfield (Gatiss), a mortician who loves his job, but is fired in Series 3 when certain activities are seen to have been inappropriate.
- Glen and Barry Baggs (Gatiss and Pemberton), debt collectors who are not good at their job, especially the obese Barry (Pemberton), who is childish and in permanent need of food. Their boss is Mr Lisgoe (Shearsmith), who deals with them violently. They appear in one episode in Series 3.
- Pop (Pemberton) is a lecherous Greek, the world's seediest landlord and its worst father, to his cringing sons Richie (Shearsmith) and Al (Gatiss). In Series 1 he disowns Richie after nine Maverick bars were stolen from his newspaper booth, and in Series 2 he ruins Al's chances of a relationship with a nurse called Patricia (Sian Gibson). Aside from owning a string of newsagents' and some tenements, Pop also owns a strip club which features in Series 3. When would-be tenants refuse to sign his contracts, he denounces them as being homosexual until they sign. In the 2017 specials, he returns to visit Al who is now married to Patricia with whom he has two daughters. Whilst his wife wishes Pop to leave, Pop decides to visit Richie at his delicatessen, where he forces him to anally receive an entire jar of piri-piri olives and nine Picnic bars (since Mavericks are no longer made). In a fantasy sequence, Al's wife dares him to fit in the olive jar, which he magically does and is trapped by Richie, declaring "I've got you". However, in reality, Richie has murdered Pop just as Al and his wife arrive. They are last seen glancing at a mincing machine as a way to get rid of Pop's body, presumably in reference to Hilary Briss's "special stuff".
- Christopher Frost (Shearsmith), store detective. Frost is a store detective who takes his work just a little too seriously, making a special effort to look inside prams, in case "baby turns out to be a 16-piece Queen Anne Breakfast set". He also targets people using wheelchairs, completely prepared to ask them to slide over in their seats in case they are sitting on a book or a plate, saying "Chalk 'em up!" It turns out he is a shoplifter himself in Series 2.
- Terry Lollard (Shearsmith) and Anne Hand (Pemberton), two religious door-to-door people who also sell loft conversions. Anne remains mostly silent and appears to have the mental age of a young child. They appear in one episode in series 3.
- Ken Sweeney, blind photographer. He has a shop on the high street, and is hired by Geoff as the photographer at Mike and Cheryl's wedding in series 1. He is seen briefly in Series 2 in the circus audience with a massive nosebleed.
- Lance Longthorne (Gatiss), a cockney joke shop owner with a sadistic sense of humour. He only has one arm and claims that the other was ripped from its socket by the Frankenstein monster at a young age. In Series 3 he gets a bigger role with his own story about being controlled by his new arm. His arm compels him to save Pauline from Geoff and he subsequently dies a hero.
- Little Don (played by Don Estelle), who runs a zoo on a town roundabout. He has a pig, a goat and a chimp. All three are stolen and killed by Edward, who creates a monster out of the body parts in an attempt to halt construction of the new road in Series 1.
- Kenny Harris (Gatiss), owner of the Dog Cinema. He is assisted by Shelley Shirley (Shearsmith) and Oshi Kurosawa (Pemberton). His rival is Dougal Siepp (Christopher Eccleston), who is more into cat films. They appear in one episode in Series 3.
- Dean Tavalouris (Shearsmith), a hopeless street magician who uses his camera to film tricks in the street (a couple of pensioners lose interest, while two youths reveal his secret and stub a cigarette out in his hand). He uses his camera to cover the aftermath of the big accident at the end of Series 3. Named after the renowned 1970s film production designer.
- Alvin (Gatiss) and Sunny Steele (Chrissie Furness), who run Windemere Guest House. Sunny regularly arranges and hosts bondage parties, at which Alvin, a plain man who is fond of gardening, is often left feeling awkward. In Series 3, Sunny and the attendees at one of her bondage parties are killed in a sex guru's machine after he has a heart attack and dies before he can switch the air back on, asphyxiating everyone else. Meanwhile, Alvin has an affair with Judith Buckle (Shearsmith), who works at a garden centre. After Alvin and Judith leave the Windermere Guest House, a BBC television crew arrive to film a show that involves quickly constructing something in someone's garden (Alvin's garden being the next one they work on) and leaving. The construction workers come close to discovering the bodies but are interrupted by Geoff when he crashes into Alvin's wall in the big accident at the end of each episode.
- Professor Erno Breastpinch'd (Gatiss), a man carrying out a survey on the streets of Royston Vasey in Series 3, but his only question is if a woman wants her breasts pinched.
- Mayor Larry Vaughan (Roy Chubby Brown, Series 2). Larry Vaughan is a reference to the film Jaws, where Amity Island's Mayor also has this name. Ironically, he is also extremely foul-mouthed, and his bad language usually gets him in trouble with the media. In the end he dies from a massive nosebleed just after assuring the public that the nosebleeds have stopped. His last words are "Urrrgggh...bastards". An interesting note would be that Roy Chubby Brown's real name is in fact Royston Vasey, so he is the namesake of the village in which almost all of the League of Gentlemen takes place.
- Murray Mint (Gatiss), Vaughan's right-hand man. He is fired when he hires Legz Akimbo to try and calm the homeless during the epidemic in Series 2. He is rehired by the new mayor, Bernice, in the 2017 specials. His name is an obvious pun on the Murray mint confectionery.
- Mick McNamara, the Stump Hole Caverns guide (Gatiss), who believes that he is responsible for the death of a small boy called Jay who once took part in his tour on a school trip. He appears in Series 1.
- Farmer Jed Tinsel (Pemberton), the frighteningly paranoid and jealous farmer. Several of his animals have been killed by Mr. Chinnery. He imprisons Andrew Ward (Gatiss), who worked at the local cash and carry in Series 1, because he had an affair with Tinsel's wife. Ward tries to get help from the Denton twins, but they simply ignore him.
- Cathy Carter-Smith (Shearsmith), Pauline's rival Restart officer whose behaviour is even more arrogant and patronising towards her clients. Cathy seems to be as obsessed with computers as Pauline is with pens. It is hinted in the first live show that she also shares Pauline's lesbian tendencies. Pauline has an intense dislike of Cathy, referring to her as a "tubby little tit-witch." In addition to the live shows, she appears in Series 2.
- Mr Ingleby (Shearsmith), a shopkeeper who insists on doing all the work in his shop himself, despite him being small (his height varies over the episodes). He only appears in the radio series; an escapologist called "Ingleby" is seen in Series 2 as part of Papa Lazarou's Pandemonium Carnival.
- Tish Guppy (Pemberton, Series 3), a massively self-centred fag hag. She appears friendly and welcoming but reveals herself to only care about maintaining her own social standing and self-importance. She is seen hanging around Camden with Phil in Series 3.
- Mr Wint and Mr Kidd, two construction workers who are seen planning for the new road in the beginning of "The Road to Royston Vasey". The pair inquire to Edward and Tubbs, with the intent of purchasing their land on behalf of PQ Construction. Unfortunately, Mr Kidd mentions that the road will bring strangers into their shop and invokes the wrath of the couple. The pair are subjected to ritualistic torture and sexual assault before Edward lets them go. However, he immediately chases after them with a crossbow, and their ultimate fate is left unclear. The two share their names with a pair of assassins in the Ian Fleming novel Diamonds Are Forever and the James Bond film of the same name.
- Grandma Bradley, a missing elderly woman. A missing persons poster was put up for her in "The Road to Royston Vasey". It is later shown that she has become trapped on the roof of the church and eventually dies there. She appears in Series 1.
- Tony Cluedo (Ted Robbins), Lead vocalist of Crème Brulee. The band reunited on tour without Les McQueen and subsequently refuses to have him back. The other members, Patch Lafeyette (Shearsmith) and Bob Chagnall (Pemberton) still currently write the songs. In Series 2, Les offers him his savings to fund the band but he takes them and disappears. Tony Cluedo also has asthma and regularly uses an inhaler.
- Nancy (Pemberton) and Noel Glass (Shearsmith), husband and wife and parents to Casey (Brooke Vincent), whom they enter regularly into beauty pageants despite her reluctance. While Casey is polite and quiet, her overbearing parents are stuck-up and rude, rejoicing as a child competing against their daughter falls and bursts into tears before taking the credit for their daughter's ensuing win. Casey is seen by her parents solely as a means of self-glorification and thus is neglected, at one point being nearly left behind in a car park after her inebriated parents drive off, returning for her as an afterthought. They appear in one episode in Series 3.
- Anthony 'Neds' Needham (Gatiss), an "adult baby" who is friends with the 13-year-old Tris (Gary Damer). Both are obsessive fans of the series Knight Rider, for which reason Neds converts a rusty Renault 5 into a talking car, Maxie Power, with a pre-recorded voice ("Let's solve some crime!" and "Hello, Neds" are two examples of its sayings) and the ability to drop paperclips at the press of a button (the shop had run out of drawing pins). Neds persuades Tris to accompany him in "Maxie Power" to fight crime. This goes awry, however, when they attempt to prevent a gang from robbing cigarettes from the cash and carry in Series 3. The pair are last seen trapped inside a burning warehouse.
- Dr Fish (Shearsmith), a Doctor at St Mary of Bethlehem Hospital who struggles to give bad news to patients ("How old would you have been next birthday?"). In Series 2, he attempts to apprise Mr Bamford (Gatiss), who would have been 45 next birthday, though will die in an "amount of time beginning with 2", of his terminal illness through obtuse film references. When this fails, he calls in Dr Lucas Wesley (Pemberton), only for him to attempt the same. Dr Wesley later reappears in Series 3, performing Lance Longthorn's illicit arm transplant, having been coerced by hospital DJ Mike King.
- Derek (Pemberton), a drunken vagrant who is actually revealed to be a practising dentist.
- Toddy (Gatiss), a bingo-caller who recounts a tragic tale of lost love at a local bingo hall.
