= Barbara Dixon =

Barbara Dixon or Dickson may refer to:

- Barbara Dixon, former president of Truman State University
- Barbara Dickson, Scottish actress and singer
- Barbara Dixon, a fictional character in the British comedy series The League of Gentlemen
