= Reece Shearsmith =

British actor, comedian and writer (born 1969)

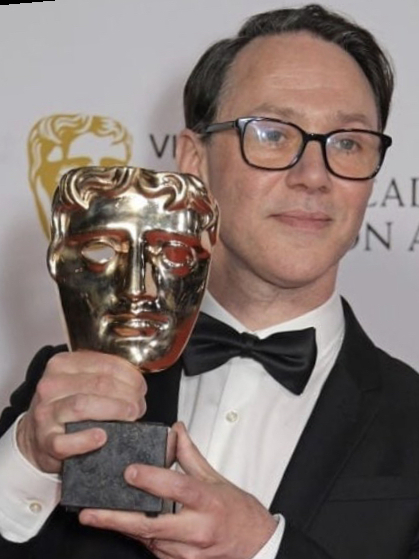
- Shearsmith in 2021
- Born: 27 August 1969 (age 57); Kingston upon Hull, England
- Education: Bretton Hall College
- Occupations: Actor; comedian; director; producer; writer; magician
- Years active: 1995–present
- Spouse: Jane Shearsmith (m. 2001)
- Children: 2

Reeson Wayne Shearsmith (born 27 August 1969) is a British actor, comedian and writer. He is a member of The League of Gentlemen, with Steve Pemberton, Mark Gatiss and Jeremy Dyson. Jointly with Pemberton, he created, wrote and starred in the sitcom Psychoville and the dark comedy anthology series Inside No. 9. Shearsmith also had notable roles in Spaced and The World's End.

== Early life ==
Shearsmith was born in Kingston upon Hull, East Riding of Yorkshire. He attended Andrew Marvell High School and then Bretton Hall College of Education, where he met Mark Gatiss and Steve Pemberton, fellow actors and comedians.

== Career ==
=== 1995–2005 ===
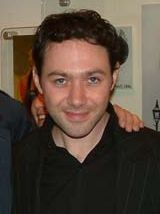
Shearsmith in 2003

The League of Gentlemen began as a stage act in 1995, transferred to Radio 4 as On the Town with The League of Gentlemen in 1997, and arrived on television on BBC Two in 1999. The last saw Shearsmith and his colleagues awarded a British Academy Television Award, a Royal Television Society Award and the prestigious Golden Rose of Montreux.

Following The League of Gentlemen, Shearsmith appeared in comedy programmes including Max and Paddy's Road to Nowhere as well as playing villain Tony in the Vic Reeves and Bob Mortimer comedy Catterick. He appeared in two episodes of the award-winning pop-culture comedy Spaced as Robot Wars-obsessed TA soldier Dexter, and played neurotic Doctor Flynn in hospital sitcom TLC alongside Alexander Armstrong.

=== 2005–2013 ===
From March 2006 to January 2007, he appeared in the West End as Leo Bloom in The Producers. In the 2008 English-language DVD release of the cult 2006 Norwegian animated film Free Jimmy, Shearsmith voiced the character of "Ante", a heavy-set, bizarrely dressed biker member of the "Lappish Mafia". In this, his voice is used along with Steve Pemberton and Mark Gatiss. Psychoville began June 2009 and marked his return to BBC2. The dark comedy series was written by Shearsmith and his League of Gentlemen writing partner Steve Pemberton. Both Shearsmith and Pemberton played numerous characters in the programme, which ran for two series and a Halloween special.

In 2010 Shearsmith appeared in the John Landis black comedy Burke & Hare. In 2011, Cameron Mackintosh's new musical Betty Blue Eyes opened in the West End, in which Shearsmith played downtrodden husband Gilbert Chilvers (a chiropodist) alongside Sarah Lancashire. In 2012, he appeared in Bad Sugar, a comedy pilot written by Sam Bain and Jesse Armstrong, along with Olivia Colman, Julia Davis and Sharon Horgan. A full series order was cancelled due to availability of the writers and cast. He also appeared in comedy pilot The Function Room.

In 2012, he was nominated for his first Laurence Olivier Award in the Best Actor in a Musical category for his performance in Betty Blue Eyes.

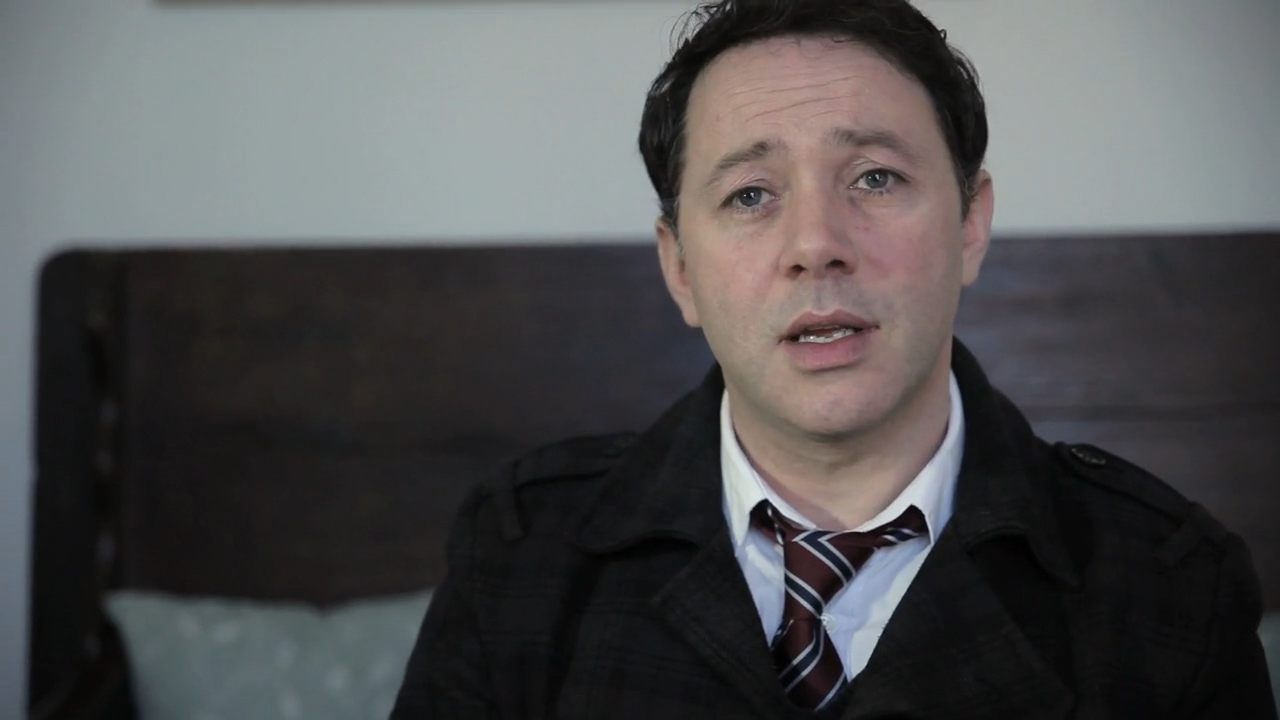
Shearsmith in 2013

In 2013, he played Patrick Troughton in An Adventure in Space and Time, a docu-drama about the conception and making of Doctor Who, which was written by Mark Gatiss. He worked with Vic Reeves and Bob Mortimer again in the first series of House of Fools as Martin the ghost and in the Christmas special as Santa. He made two guest appearances in Jeremy Dyson's Psychobitches as Old Mother Shipton in series one and Princess Margaret in series two. Also in 2013, he starred in Ben Wheatley's A Field in England as Whitehead and appeared in The World's End.

=== 2014–2020 ===
In 2014, Shearsmith and Pemberton returned to BBC Two with a new dark comedy series called Inside No. 9. Each episode of the anthology series takes place in a different "No. 9" location. Shearsmith and Pemberton play various characters in the series and have also directed two of the episodes. Also in 2014, he starred as Malcolm Webster in ITV drama series, based on a true story, The Widower.

He starred as Detective Sergeant Stone in Chasing Shadows, an ITV drama series about missing persons.

In 2015, he played Gagan Rassmussen in the Series 9 Doctor Who episode "Sleep No More", Steele in High-Rise directed by Ben Wheatley, Ray in Peter Kay's Car Share and Pastor John in the Christmas specials of Julia Davis' Hunderby. In February 2015, Shearsmith was interviewed by Adam Buxton on BBC Radio 4's Chain Reaction and he then interviewed Bob Mortimer.

He appeared in Hangmen at the Royal Court Theatre from Thursday 10 September to Saturday 10 October 2015.

In 2016, he appeared in Mid Morning Matters with Alan Partridge, American musical comedy series Galavant and dark comedy thriller Stag. He appeared live at Latitude Festival in Southwold, Suffolk.

A Christmas special of Inside No. 9 aired in December 2016 and a third series in 2017.

In 2017, Shearsmith appeared in the part-animated film Borley Rectory: The Most Haunted House in England. It was written and directed by Ashley Thorpe and co-starred Jonathan Rigby. Shearsmith also appeared in the title role in The Dresser at the Chichester Festival Theatre, as well as reuniting with The League of Gentlemen for three television specials, transmitted on BBC2 in December 2017.

Shearsmith appeared as himself in the 2018 short film To Trend on Twitter in aid of young people with cancer charity CLIC Sargent with fellow comedians David Baddiel, Steve Pemberton, Helen Lederer and actor Jason Flemyng.

=== 2020–present ===
In 2020, he received a nomination for the Laurence Olivier Award for Best Actor in a Supporting Role for his performance at The Old Vic as "the President" and "Jon" in A Very Expensive Poison (a play adapted from the account by Luke Harding of the murder of Putin critic, Alexander Litvinenko).

In June 2020, Netflix removed The League of Gentlemen from its platform due to concerns that Shearsmith's character, Papa Lazarou, resembled blackface. The series remained on BBC iPlayer with a content warning. Shearsmith denied that the character was intended to portray a Black man, stating that it was meant as "clown-like makeup" and was inspired by the scary figure of the Child Catcher in Chitty Chitty Bang Bang and the mannerisms of a former Greek landlord, Peter Papalazarou. British comedian, Gina Yashere, criticized this claim, stating, "That was not a clown. That was a golliwog. He didn't come up with anything. All he did was take all the horrible depictions of Black people on products as far back as the 1800s and reconstituted it, and said it's ironic."

In 2021, he appeared as a contestant in the 4th series of The Great Stand Up to Cancer Bake Off. For his performance in Series 5 of Inside No. 9, Shearsmith received a nomination for Best Male Comedy Performance at the 2021 British Academy Television Awards. In December 2021, Shearsmith and Pemberton toured the UK as Inside No.9: An Evening With Reece Shearsmith and Steve Pemberton answering fan questions and share behind-the-scenes stories from the series.

In April 2022, Shearsmith once again co-wrote and starred in the seventh series of Inside No. 9. The series premiered on 20 April 2022. In May 2022, Shearsmith starred as Peter in The Unfriend, alongside Frances Barber and Amanda Abbington. The play was written by Steven Moffatt and directed by Mark Gatiss. The play transferred to the West End in 2023. In September 2022, Shearsmith starred in Tom George's film See How They Run, where he played British film producer John Woolf. In 2023, Shearsmith starred as Professor Ware in Saltburn.

On 3 May 2024, it was announced that Shearsmith and Pemberton would write and star in a stage adaptation of the series called Inside No. 9 Stage/Fright which opened at the Wyndham's Theatre in London's West End from 18 January 2025 for a limited run until 5 April. It was directed by Simon Evans. Tickets for the 85 shows were released on 8 May 2024. Due to the success of the London run, the show toured the UK in autumn 2025 with final shows at the Hammersmith Apollo from 2 January 2026 to 6 January.

In 2025, Shearsmith was a contestant in the 20th series of Taskmaster, alongside Ania Magliano, Maisie Adam, Phil Ellis and Sanjeev Bhaskar.

In October 2026, Shearsmith published Things I Took From The Dark; the book topped the Hardback Non-Fiction chart in the UK, one week after its release.

== Personal life ==
Shearsmith is married to Jane Shearsmith, whom he first met while touring a play. They have two children together.

The University of Huddersfield awarded him an honorary doctorate of letters in 2003.

Shearsmith is a fan of Neil Hannon and his band The Divine Comedy.

== Works ==
=== Film ===
Year	Title	Role	Notes
1995	P.R.O.B.E. – The Devil of Winterborne	Andrew Powell	Video
1996	P.R.O.B.E. – The Ghosts of Winterborne	Andrew Powell	Video short
1997	Auton	Dr Daniel Matthews	Video
1999	This Year's Love	Tourist	
1999	The Comedy Trail: A Shaggy Dog Story	Edward Tattsyrup	TV special
2001	Birthday Girl	Porter	
2004	Shaun of the Dead	Mark	
2005	The Hitchhiker's Guide to the Galaxy	Additional Vogon voices	
2005	The League of Gentlemen's Apocalypse	Various	Also writer
2006	Free Jimmy	Ante (voice)	English dub
2006	The League of Gentlemen Are Behind You!	Various	Video
2008	The Cottage	Peter	
2010	Burke and Hare	Sergeant Mackenzie	
2010	Good Boy	Underdog	Short film
2012	Him Indoors	Gregory Brewster	Short film
2013	A Field in England	Whitehead	
2013	The World's End	Collaborator	
2015	High-Rise	Nathan Steele	
2017	Borley Rectory	V. C. Wall	
2021	In the Earth	Zach	
2021	Venom: Let There Be Carnage	Priest	
2022	See How They Run	John Woolf	
2023	Saltburn	Professor Ware	
2024	Wallace & Gromit: Vengeance Most Fowl	Norbot (voice)	
2026	Rogue Trooper	Bagman	

Key
†	Denotes films that have not yet been released

=== Television ===
Year	Title	Role	Notes
1995	Alas Smith and Jones	Unknown	
1995	London's Burning	Martin	Episode #8.2
1996	Friday Night Armistice	Performer	
1996	Mash and Peas	Jerry Berkowi	Episode: "American Sitcoms"
1998	Lenny Goes to Town	Unknown	Episode: "Brighton"
1998	Alexei Sayle's Merry-Go-Round	Phillip Arthurs	Episode #1.5
1998	In the Red	Broadcast Journalist	3 episodes
1999–2002, 2017	The League of Gentlemen	Various	22 episodes; also writer
2000	Randall and Hopkirk (Deceased)	Helium Harry	Episode: "Two Can Play at That Game"
2001	Spaced	Dexter	2 episodes
2002	TLC	Dr. Laurence Flynn	6 episodes
2002	Robbie the Reindeer: Legend of the Lost Tribe	Viking (voice)	Television film
2004	Catterick	Tony	6 episodes
2004	Monkey Trousers	Various	Television film
2004	Max and Paddy's Road to Nowhere	Bobster	Episode #1.3
2007	The Abbey	Dr. Darren	Television film
2007	Agatha Christie's Marple	Inspector Huish	Episode: "Ordeal by Innocence"
2007	Modern Men	Actor	
2007	Comedy Showcase	Freddie	Episode: "Ladies and Gentlemen"
2007	Christmas at the Riviera	Ashley	Television film
2008	New Tricks	Jeremy Kirk	Episode: "A Face for Radio"
2008	Coming Up	Lickle Bill Um	Episode: "Lickle Bill Um"
2009	Would I Lie to You?	Himself	Episode #3.8
2009	Mid Life Christmas	Vicar	Television film
2009–2011	Psychoville	Various	14 episodes; also writer
2010	The First Men in the Moon	Moon	Television film
2010	The Bear	Luka	Television film
2011	Eric and Ernie	Harry Wiseman	Television film
2012	The Hollow Crown	Davy	Episode: "Henry IV, Part II"
2012	Comedy Showcase	P.C. Bracket	Episode: "The Function Room"
2012	Swiftcover SwiftBrothers advertising campaign	Voice actor	
2012	Comedy Showcase	Greg	Episode: "Bad Sugar"
2012	Silent Night of the Living Dead	Actor	
2012–2013	Horrible Histories	Hollywood Producer #1	10 episodes
2013	An Adventure in Space and Time	Patrick Troughton	Television film
2013–2014	Psychobitches	Various	2 episodes
2014	The Widower	Malcolm Webster	3 episodes
2014	Chasing Shadows	DS Sean Stone	4 episodes
2014	House of Fools	Martin / Santa	2 episodes
2014	Dead Funny: Horror Stories by Comedians	Writer	
2014–2024	Inside No. 9	Various	Also writer and director; 53 episodes
2015	Peter Kay's Car Share	Ray the Fishmonger	Episode #1.3
2015	Doctor Who	Gagan Rassmussen	Episode: "Sleep No More"
2015	Hunderby	Pastor John	2 episodes
2016	Galavant	Neo of Sporin	Episode: "Love and Death"
2016	Mid Morning Matters with Alan Partridge	Jasper Jones	Episode: "Jasper + Chef"
2016	Stag	Wendy	2 episodes
2016	Diddy TV	Mr. Stockholm	4 episodes
2019	Good Omens	William Shakespeare; Furfur	Season 1: 1 episode Season 2: 3 episodes
2019–2025	The Adventures of Paddington	Mr. Curry (voice)	
2021	The Great Stand Up to Cancer Bake Off	Himself/contestant	Episode #4.3
2021	Foundation	Jerril	2 episodes
2022	The Witchfinder	Matthew Hopkins	Series 1 Episode 6
2024	3 Body Problem	Alan Turing	Episode: "Destroyer of Worlds"
2024	The Party's Over	Himself	BBC2 Inside No. 9 documentary
2025	Taskmaster	Himself	Contestant; Series 20
2025	The Wheel	Himself	Contestant
2026	LOL: Last One Laughing UK	Himself	Halloween special
TBA	Prodigies		

=== Stage credits ===
Year	Title	Role	Notes
1995	The League of Gentlemen	Various / writer	Edinburgh Fringe Festival
2001	The League of Gentlemen: A Local Show for Local People	Various / writer	UK tour
2001	The League of Gentlemen: A Local Show for Local People	Various / writer	Theatre Royal, Drury Lane
2002	'Art'	Yvan	Whitehall Theatre
2005	The League of Gentlemen Are Behind You!	Various / writer	UK tour
2005	As You Like It	Jacques	Wyndham's Theatre
2006	The Producers	Leo Bloom	Theatre Royal, Drury Lane
2008	The Common Pursuit	Nick	Menier Chocolate Factory
2009	Comedians	Phil Murray	Lyric Hammersmith
2010	Ghost Stories	Professor Phillip Goodman	Duke of York's Theatre
2011	Betty Blue Eyes	Gilbert Chilvers	Novello Theatre
2012	Absent Friends	Colin	Harold Pinter Theatre
2014	Cool Rider	Mr Stewart	Lyric Theatre, London
2015	Hangmen	Syd Armfield	Royal Court Theatre
2016	The Dresser	Norman	Duke of York's Theatre
2018	Hangmen	Syd Armfield	Atlantic Theater Company
2018	The League of Gentlemen Live Again!	Various / writer	UK tour
2019	A Very Expensive Poison	The President / Jon	The Old Vic
2022	The Unfriend	Peter	Minerva Theatre, Chichester
2023	The Unfriend	Peter	Criterion Theatre, London
2025	Inside No. 9 Stage/Fright	Various / writer	Wyndham's Theatre, London
2025	Inside No. 9 Stage/Fright	Various / writer	UK tour
2026	Inside No. 9 Stage/Fright	Various / writer	Hammersmith Apollo
2026	Jesus Christ Superstar	King Herod	Theatre Royal, Drury Lane

=== Publications ===
Year	Title	Role
2000	A Local Book for Local People	Writer
2026	Things I Took From The Dark: The Museum Of Me	Writer, illustrator

=== Radio ===
Year	Title	Role
1997	On the Town with The League of Gentlemen	Writer/Actor
2012	Bird Island	Ben Jones
2024	Uncanny	Guest
2025	High Cockalorum	Harvey / Librarian / DJ
2026	The Madness of George III	Willis
