= Steve Pemberton =

English actor and comedian (born 1967)

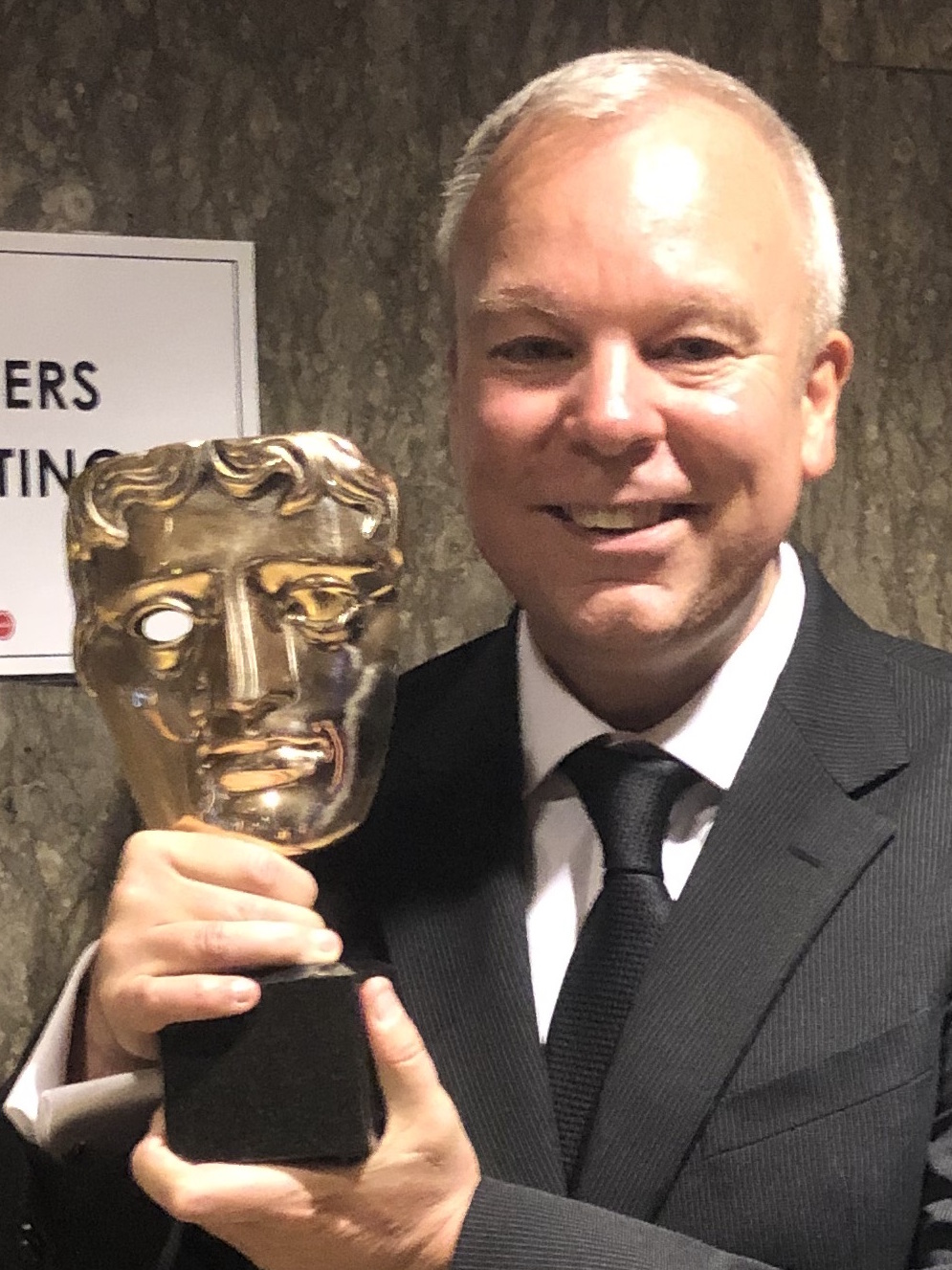
- Pemberton after winning a BAFTA for Inside No. 9 in 2019
- Born: 1 September 1967 (age 59); Blackburn, Lancashire, England
- Education: Bretton Hall College of Education
- Occupations: Actor, comedian, director, writer
- Years active: 1995–present
- Partner: Alison Rowles
- Children: 3

Steven James Pemberton (born 1 September 1967) is an English actor, comedian, director and writer.

Pemberton trained as an actor at the Bretton Hall College of Education, where he met Mark Gatiss and Reece Shearsmith. The three went on to create the BBC surrealist horror-comedy series The League of Gentlemen (1999–2002; 2017) and its film adaptation The League of Gentlemen's Apocalypse (2005) with Jeremy Dyson. Pemberton also co-created and starred with Shearsmith in the black comedy TV series Psychoville (2009–2011) and Inside No. 9 (2014–2024); for the latter, he has won four awards, including the BAFTA for Best Male Comedy Performance in 2019.

Pemberton's other notable television performances include Blackpool (2004), Shameless (2004), Benidorm (2007–2015), Doctor Who (2008), Whitechapel (2009–2013), Happy Valley (2014) and Mapp & Lucia (2014); additionally, his feature film credits include Lassie (2005), The Hitchhiker's Guide to the Galaxy (2005), Mr. Bean's Holiday (2007) and Better Man (2024).

== Early life ==
Pemberton was born in Blackburn, Lancashire on 1 September 1967 and grew up around Chorley, attending Saint Michael's Church of England High School in the town. He trained as an actor at Bretton Hall College of Education where he met Mark Gatiss and Reece Shearsmith.

== Career ==
=== Film and television ===
Pemberton's television performance credits include Whitechapel, Doctor Who, Benidorm, Under the Greenwood Tree, Hotel Babylon, The Last Detective, Randall and Hopkirk, Blackpool and Shameless. In 2004, he portrayed Dr Bessner in Death on the Nile and Harry Secombe in The Life and Death of Peter Sellers. He also appeared in the film Lassie (2005).

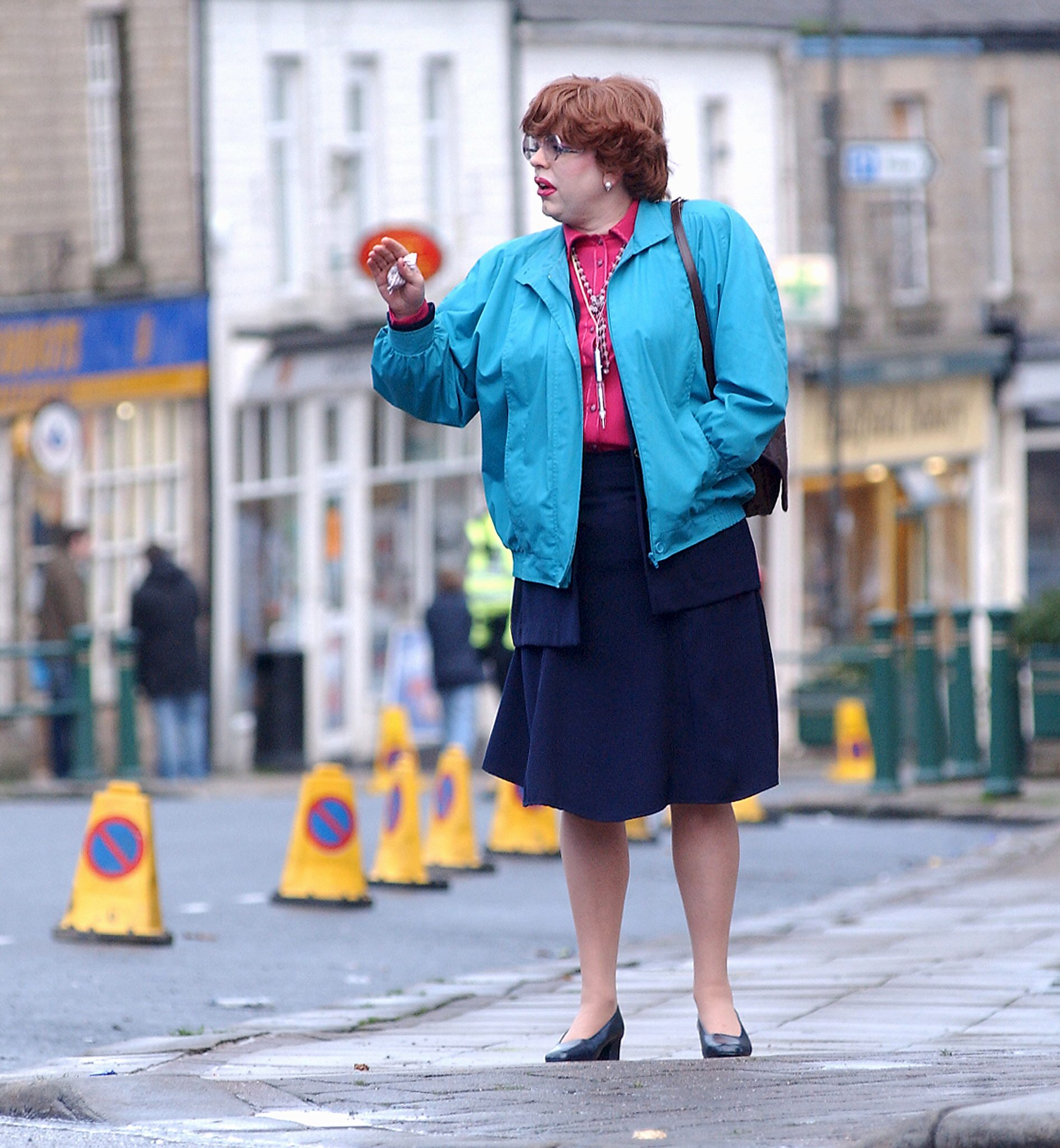
Pemberton as Pauline in The League of Gentlemen's Apocalypse

Pemberton is best known as being a member of the sketch comedy team The League of Gentlemen, along with fellow performers Mark Gatiss, Reece Shearsmith, and co-writer Jeremy Dyson, all of whom he met at Bretton Hall College in his late teens. The League of Gentlemen initially began as a stage act in 1995, then transferred to BBC Radio 4 as On the Town with the League of Gentlemen in 1997, and finally arrived on television on BBC Two in 1999. The latter has seen Pemberton and his colleagues awarded a British Academy Television Award, a Royal Television Society Award, and a Golden Rose of Montreux.

From 2007 to 2015, Pemberton appeared as Mick Garvey in Benidorm. Pemberton appeared in 43 episodes.

In the 2008 English language DVD re-release of the cult 2006 Norwegian animated film Free Jimmy, Pemberton voiced Mattis, a heavy-set and bizarrely-dressed biker member of the Lappish Mafia. In June 2009, Psychoville aired and marked Pemberton's return to BBC Two. It was co-written by Pemberton and his fellow League of Gentlemen member, Reece Shearsmith. Both of them play numerous characters in the series, similar to the format of The League of Gentlemen.

Pemberton portrayed Rufus Drumknott in 2010's Terry Pratchett's Going Postal. He appeared as Vice Principal Douglas Panch in the Donmar's 2011 production of The 25th Annual Putnam County Spelling Bee. In 2014, he played Georgie Pillson in an adaptation of E. F. Benson's Mapp and Lucia. He also wrote the adaptation, which featured his League of Gentlemen colleague Mark Gatiss. It was broadcast during Christmas 2014. Since 2014, he has starred as various characters in the dark comedy anthology series Inside No. 9, which he co-created with Shearsmith, airing on BBC Two. The series ran for 10 years ending with series 9 on 12 June 2024 with a documentary aired on 22 December 2024 titled "The Party's Over".

Pemberton reunited with his The League of Gentlemen colleagues in 2017 for three special episodes, transmitted in December 2017 on BBC2. He appeared as himself in the 2018 short film To Trend on Twitter in aid of young people with cancer charity CLIC Sargent with fellow comedians David Baddiel, Reece Shearsmith, Helen Lederer and actor Jason Flemyng.

In October 2021, Pemberton was nominated for Best Outstanding Comedy Actor at the inaugural National Comedy Awards for Stand Up to Cancer for his appearances in series 6 of Inside No. 9.

Pemberton was a contestant on the seventeenth series of the Channel 4 show Taskmaster in 2024.

Pemberton portrayed Peter Williams, the father of Robbie Williams in the singer's musical biopic film Better Man, directed by Michael Gracey which was released in late 2024.

=== Theatre ===
Pemberton's early work centred mainly around fringe theatre; he was a founding member of the 606 Theatre with Gordon Anderson, Tom Hadley, and producer Shane Walter. He has produced, performed in, and directed various stage productions.

In 2020 it was announced that Pemberton would join Aaron Taylor-Johnson on West End stage in Martin McDonagh's The Pillowman, directed by Matthew Dunster. However, due to the COVID-19 pandemic, the run was postponed until 2021. Pemberton said, "It's been a dark time for the performing arts and I can't wait to have the theatres open again. Unfortunately, The Pillowman has to be put to bed for now, but I very much hope that we'll be able to bring Martin's dazzling play to the West End before too long." The play was staged from 10 June 2023 to 2 September 2023 at the Duke of York's Theatre in London's West End with Lily Allen, Paul Kaye, Pemberton, and Matthew Tennison. The Guardian praised Pemberton's performance as "unfailingly excellent", although other reviews of the play were mixed.

On 3 May 2024, it was announced that Pemberton and Shearsmith would write and star in a stage adaptation of Inside No. 9 called Stage/Fright which opened at the Wyndham's Theatre in London's West End from 18 January 2025 for a limited run until 5 April, directed by Simon Evans. Tickets for the 85 shows were released on 8 May 2024. Due to the success of the London run, the show toured the UK in autumn 2025.

=== Other ===
Pemberton has written for Variety and was the assistant editor of the International Film Guide from 1991 to 1998.

== Personal life ==
Pemberton lives in North London, with his partner, Alison Rowles, and their three children: Lucas, Madeline, and Adam.

He also speaks German and French.

The University of Huddersfield awarded Pemberton an Honorary Doctorate of letters in 2003 alongside Mark Gatiss, Reece Shearsmith and Jeremy Dyson. In July 2024 he received two Honorary Fellowships which are from the University of Lancashire and University of York (alongside Reece Shearsmith).

Pemberton is a football fan and a supporter of Blackburn Rovers F.C.

== Filmography ==
=== Film ===
Year	Title	Role	Notes
1999	The Comedy Trail: A Shaggy Dog Story	Tubbs Tattsyrup	TV special
2001	Birthday Girl	Duty Sergeant	
2004	The Life and Death of Peter Sellers	Harry Secombe	
2004	Churchill: The Hollywood Years	Chester	
2005	The League of Gentlemen's Apocalypse	Tubbs / Pauline / Herr Lipp/ Self	Also co-creator and co-writer
2005	Lassie	Hynes	
2005	The Hitchhiker's Guide to the Galaxy	Mr. Prosser / Additional Vogon voices	Collectively credited as "The League of Gentlemen"
2005	Match Point	Detective Parry	
2007	Mr. Bean's Holiday	Vicar	
2007	I Could Never Be Your Woman	Censor	
2008	Free Jimmy	Mattis (voice)	English version
2011	Corvus	Vic	Short film
2012	National Theatre Live: She Stoops to Conquer	Hardcastle	
2012	Football Managers	Oliver	Writer
2018	Take Rabbit	Man	Short film
2018	To Trend on Twitter	Himself	Short film
2024	Better Man	Peter Williams	

=== Television ===
Year	Title	Role	Notes
1995	Alice in Russialand	Various Characters	TV film
1996	Mash and Peas	Fritz	Episode: "American Sitcoms"
1998	In the Red	Lawrence Boot-Heath	Mini-series; 2 episodes
1998	Lenny Goes to Town	(unknown)	Episode: "Stoke on Trent"
1999–2002, 2017	The League of Gentlemen	Various Characters	Series 1–4; 22 episodes. Co-creator and co-writer
1999	The Comedy Trail: A Shaggy Dog Story	Tubbs Tattsyrup	TV Special
2000	Gormenghast	Professor Mule	Mini-series; Episode #1.3
2000	Randall and Hopkirk (Deceased)	Sergeant Liddel	Episode: "Drop Dead"
2002	Legend of the Lost Tribe	Viking (voice)	TV film
2002	Spheriks	Kaz (2002) (voice)	
2004	Blackpool	Adrian Marr	Mini-series; 6 episodes
2004	Agatha Christie's Poirot	Dr. Bessner	Episode: "Death on the Nile"
2004	Shameless	Eddie Jackson	2 episodes: "Meet the Gallaghers" and "We're Going to the Moon"
2005	The Last Detective	Edward Netherton	Episode: "Friends Reunited"
2005	Riot at the Rite	Critic	TV film
2005	Under the Greenwood Tree	Mr. Shinar	TV film
2006	Hotel Babylon	Mr. Daniels	Episode #1.3
2007	The Bad Mother's Handbook	Leo Fairbrother	TV film
2007	Kingdom	Jack Thriplow	Episode #1.2
2007	The Old Curiosity Shop	Mr. Short	TV film
2007–2015	Benidorm	Mick Garvey	Regular; 43 episodes (Series 1–7)
2008	Agatha Christie's Marple	Henry Wake	Episode: "Murder is Easy"
2008	Tim and Eric Awesome Show, Great Job!	Eric's Drums	Episode: "Jazz"
2008	Doctor Who	Strackman Lux	2 episodes: "Silence in the Library" and "Forest of the Dead"
2009	Minder	Vlad the Imposter	Episode: "A Matter of Life and Debt"
2009–2011	Psychoville	Various Characters	14 episodes. Also co-writer
2009–2013	Whitechapel	Edward Buchan	18 episodes. Writer of 2 episodes
2010	Terry Pratchett's Going Postal	Drumknott	Mini-series; 2 episodes
2010	The First Men in the Moon	Sun	TV film
2012	Mr Stink	Sir Derek Dimble	TV film
2012	Sport Relief 2012	Mick Garvey	Episode: Benidorm meets Britain's Got Talent
2012–2013	Horrible Histories	Hollywood Producer #3	3 episodes
2013	Heading Out	Jonathan Walters	Episode #1.4
2013	Psychobitches	Dian Fossey	Mini-series; Episode #1.2
2014	Mapp & Lucia	Georgie Pillson	3 episodes. Also writer
2014	Happy Valley	Kevin Weatherill	6 episodes
2014	Toast of London	Francis Bacon	Episode: "Fool in Love"
2014–2024	Inside No. 9	Various Characters	53 episodes. Co-writer and director
2015	Lewis	Ian Tedman	2 episodes: "One for Sorrow: Parts 1 and 2"
2015	Professor Branestawm Returns	Professor Algebrain	TV film
2016	Camping	Robin	Mini-series; 6 episodes
2016	Tracey Ullman's Show	Colin	Episode #1.2
2017	Midsomer Murders	Timothy Benson	Episode: "Red in Tooth & Claw"
2018	The Interrogation of Tony Martin	Tony Martin	TV film
2018	The League of Gentlemen Live Again!	Various Characters	TV Special
2019	Bounty Hunters	(unknown)	Episode #2.1
2019	Britannia	Emperor Claudius	2 episodes: "Imperial Visit" and "May the Gods Speak"
2019–2021	Worzel Gummidge	Mr. Braithwaite	6 episodes
2019, 2023	Good Omens	Mr. Glozier	2 episodes: "Hard Times" and "Nazi Zombie Flesheaters"
2020	Death in Paradise	Neil Henderson	Episode: "Switcharoo"
2020	Killing Eve	Paul	Recurring role; 5 episodes
2022	Ladhood	The Gardener	2 episodes: "Initiative" and "TV"
2022	Brassic	Mr. King	Episode: "Murder Mystery"
2023	The Power of Parker	Sandy	3 episodes
2024	Taskmaster	Himself - Contestant	Series 17; 10 episodes
2024	The Read	Narrator	Episode: "The Remains of the Day"
2024	The Cleaner	Donald	Series 3; Episode 2: "The Baby"
2024	Alma's Not Normal	Uncle Dickie	Series 2; Episodes 3 and 5
2024	The Party's Over	Himself	BBC2 Inside No. 9 documentary
2025	Missing You	Titus	4 episodes
2025	The Hack	Rupert Murdoch	3 episodes

== Stage credits ==
Year	Title	Role	Venue
1995	The League of Gentlemen	Various / writer	Edinburgh Fringe
2001	The League of Gentlemen: A Local Show for Local People	Various / writer	UK tour
2001	The League of Gentlemen: A Local Show for Local People	Various / writer	Theatre Royal, Drury Lane
2002	Art	Mark	Whitehall Theatre
2005	The League of Gentlemen Are Behind You!	Various / writer	UK tour
2006, 2007, 2009, 2010	The Rocky Horror Show	Guest narrator	Various
2007	The Drowsy Chaperone	Man in Chair	Novello Theatre
2009	The 25th Annual Putnam County Spelling Bee	Vice Principal Douglas Panch	Donmar Warehouse
2012	She Stoops to Conquer	Mr Hardcastle	Olivier Theatre, Royal National Theatre
2016	Dead Funny	Brian	Vaudeville Theatre
2018	The League of Gentlemen Live Again!	Various / writer	UK tour
2023	The Pillowman	Tupolski	Duke of York's Theatre
2025	Inside No. 9 Stage/Fright	Various / writer	Wyndham's Theatre
2025	Inside No. 9 Stage/Fright	Various / writer	UK tour
2026	Inside No. 9 Stage/Fright	Various / writer	Hammersmith Apollo

== Awards and nominations ==
Year	Award	Category	Work	Result	Ref
2002	Laurence Olivier Award	Best Entertainment	The League of Gentlemen (with Jeremy Dyson, Mark Gatiss, and Reece Shearsmith)	Nominated	
2015	Royal Television Society	Best Comedy Performance - Male	Inside No. 9	Won	
2018	Writers' Guild of Great Britain	Best TV Situation Comedy	Inside No. 9 Epidode: 'Zanzibar' (with Reece Shearsmith)	Won	
2019	Royal Television Society	Best Comedy Performance - Male	Inside No. 9	Won	
2019	2019 British Academy Television Awards	Best Male Comedy Performance	Inside No. 9 Epidode: 'Bernie Clifton's Dressing Room'	Won	
2021	National Comedy Awards for Stand Up to Cancer	Best Outstanding Comedy Actor	Inside No. 9	Nominated	
2025	Laurence Olivier Award	Best Entertainment or Comedy Play	Inside No. 9 Stage/Fright (with Reece Shearsmith)	Nominated	
