= The League of Gentlemen =

British comedy television series

- Genre: Sitcom; Black comedy Surreal humour Comedy horror
- Created by: Jeremy Dyson; Mark Gatiss; Steve Pemberton; Reece Shearsmith
- Written by: Jeremy Dyson; Mark Gatiss; Steve Pemberton; Reece Shearsmith
- Directed by: Steve Bendelack
- Starring: Mark Gatiss; Steve Pemberton; Reece Shearsmith
- Music by: Joby Talbot
- Country of origin: United Kingdom
- Original language: English
- No. of series: 4
- No. of episodes: 22

Production
- Running time: 30–60 mins.

Original release
- Network: BBC Two
- Release: 11 January 1999 – 31 October 2002
- Release: 18 December – 20 December 2017

Related
- Psychoville; Inside No. 9

The League of Gentlemen is a British surreal comedy horror series that premiered on BBC Two in 1999. The programme is set in Royston Vasey, a fictional town in northern England, and follows the lives of bizarre characters, most of whom are played by three of the show's four writers—Mark Gatiss, Steve Pemberton, and Reece Shearsmith—who, along with Jeremy Dyson, formed the League of Gentlemen comedy troupe in 1995. The series originally aired for three series from 1999 until 2002, and was followed by a film The League of Gentlemen's Apocalypse (2005), a stage production The League of Gentlemen Are Behind You! (2005), and another live show, The League of Gentlemen Live Again! (2018)

The BBC announced in August 2017 that three new episodes would be produced to commemorate the 20th anniversary of the group's first appearance on BBC Radio 4. The aforementioned episodes aired on BBC Two on 18–20 December 2017.

The series was filmed mainly in Hadfield, Derbyshire; other locations include Bacup, Lancashire; Glossop, Gamesley, and Hope Valley in Derbyshire; Marsden, Todmorden, and Sowerby Bridge in West Yorkshire; and Mottram in Greater Manchester.

== History ==
Three of the four members of the League of Gentlemen (Steve Pemberton, Mark Gatiss and Reece Shearsmith) met at Bretton Hall College of Education. They met their final member – Jeremy Dyson – later in their comedy career. He does not act as such in the franchise but does have a few small cameo roles throughout the series. The stage show began in late 1994, and it was not long before the team took as their name the title of a 1960 Jack Hawkins film, The League of Gentlemen.

In 1997, they were awarded the Perrier award for comedy at the Edinburgh Festival Fringe and their radio series On the Town with the League of Gentlemen, debuted on BBC Radio 4. On the Town was set in the fictional town of Spent. They won a Sony Award for this six-episode run. In 1999 the show moved to television and quickly acquired a cult following; three series were produced, the first airing in 1999, the second in 2000 and the third in 2002.

A Christmas special was broadcast in December 2000, after the airing of the second series. For television, Spent was renamed Royston Vasey – the real name of comedian Roy Chubby Brown, who appears in the series, notably as the Mayor of Royston Vasey in series 2. Its influence can be seen on later series, particularly Little Britain, the first series of which was directed by Steve Bendelack and script-edited by Gatiss.

Filming took place mainly on location in the north Derbyshire town of Hadfield and consequently had no live audience. A laugh track was added to the first and second series, by inviting a studio audience to watch a playback of the completed episodes as well as the filming of certain interior scenes, such as the Dentons'. The laughter track was dropped from the Christmas Special and series 3 when shown in the United Kingdom.

The group took the show on tour for the first time in 2001, using a mixture of old and new material. In early 2005 a special one-off sketch was broadcast on the BBC for Comic Aid, a charity benefit for the tsunami disaster. In this, two of the most popular characters, Tubbs and Papa Lazarou, kidnapped Miranda Richardson. A feature-length film, The League of Gentlemen's Apocalypse, was released on 3 June 2005. Later in the same year, the League toured the UK with their new pantomime-themed show, The League of Gentlemen Are Behind You!, which ran from October to mid-December.

In September 2006, the unofficial website reported that The League of Gentlemen were to 'reunite' at the beginning of 2007, most likely to plan for the fourth series. Shearsmith and Pemberton appeared on The Russell Brand Show on 22 December 2006. When asked "Will there be any more of The League of Gentlemen?", Shearsmith simply replied "Yes" but was quick to change the subject and not reveal anything about a new series. On the official website, Shearsmith's blog entry for 23 May 2007 stated that the troupe had recently met up in London's West End: "We discussed our next project – it seems we have hit upon something. Early days – but exciting nevertheless."

Shearsmith and Pemberton later collaborated to create another dark comedy series, Psychoville (2009); Gatiss appeared in one episode. In May 2008, Shearsmith confirmed that although he and Pemberton would be making Psychoville without the other members of the League, the League would reunite in the future. The three also performed together in the fourth series of Horrible Histories, in which they play American film producers who hear film pitches from historical figures. Shearsmith and Pemberton also wrote and starred in the black comedy anthology series Inside No. 9, which premiered on BBC Two in 2014. Gatiss appeared in two episodes, in 2022 and 2024.

A one-off radio show, The League of Gentlemen's Ghost Chase, was broadcast on 28 October 2010 for Halloween. Unlike other shows, this was not a scripted dark comedy but a documentary of the members spending a night at the Ancient Ram Inn, reputedly the most haunted hotel in the country.

Speaking to BBC Radio 6 in October 2016, Mark Gatiss spoke about the desire of the creators to revive the programme in some form with Brexit forming a suitable background to revive it.

In April 2017, both Gatiss and Shearsmith confirmed that the programme would be returning for an anniversary special. The BBC announced in August 2017 that three special new episodes were to be produced, to be aired in December 2017.

== Writing and inspiration ==
One source of inspiration is the town of Alston in Cumbria. Gatiss has said in interview that the local shop was inspired by a shop in the village of Rottingdean in East Sussex, and that he was influenced growing up around the former Winterton Hospital asylum near Sedgefield in County Durham.

The majority of the inhabitants of the village – male and female – are played by Reece Shearsmith, Steve Pemberton, and Mark Gatiss. The script was written by these three, and Jeremy Dyson. Dyson, not an actor like the others, appears only in cameo roles. As there are usually only three actors on screen at any one time, the different characters mostly play out their own stories in several serialised sketches, rarely crossing into each other's storylines.

Only rarely do actors "meet themselves". Exceptions include Papa Lazarou facing the Reverend Bernice in the Christmas Special (both Reece Shearsmith), Les McQueen buying a magazine from Pop's son (both Mark Gatiss), and Alvin Steele buying food from Iris at a supermarket checkout in Series 2, both Mark Gatiss.

The idea is taken further in The League of Gentlemen's Apocalypse, when the characters meet the actors (especially when Herr Lipp meets his creator, Steve Pemberton). In the live shows, when Pam Doove was auditioning for a part in the Christmas Nativity Play, directed by Ollie Plimsolls, Pam had to audition in front of Ollie's Legz Akimbo colleague Dave (Pemberton), who said that Ollie couldn't make it "for obvious reasons". Shearsmith plays both Pam and Ollie in the television series.

=== Royston Vasey ===
Royston Vasey is a fictional English town featured in the BBC television comedy series The League of Gentlemen. The exterior shots for the series were filmed in Hadfield, Derbyshire, and, according to the writers of the series, the town is based on Alston in Cumbria. The preceding radio series On the Town with the League of Gentlemen was set in the equally fictional and almost identical town of Spent.

Royston Vasey draws on the upbringing of all the League of Gentlemen's members—Mark Gatiss, Steve Pemberton, Reece Shearsmith and Jeremy Dyson—all of whom were raised in the north of England. Royston Vasey is the real name of British stand-up comedian Roy Chubby Brown. Brown played the part of the town's mayor in a cameo appearance.

==== Description ====
The town as it appears in the TV show has a sign which ominously declares "Welcome to Royston Vasey. You'll never leave!" The first building many visitors come across is the "Local Shop". The Local Shop is located some distance from the town itself on a lonely hilltop moor.

==== Events in the fictional town ====
In the first television series of The League of Gentlemen a construction company called PQ Construction threatens the isolation of Royston Vasey by building a "New Road" near the Local Shop. The project is first delayed when a monster (later revealed to be parts of a goat, a pig and a chimp crudely stitched together by Edward Tattsyrup) is unearthed on the construction site and comes to an end in the final episode when the owner of PQ Construction, David Tattsyrup, is revealed to be the son of Edward and Tubbs who convince him to "live locally".

In the second series Royston Vasey receives visits from both a travelling circus and a group of German exchange students. The town becomes gradually overrun by a deadly nosebleed epidemic which causes a high percentage of the town's residents to experience incessant bleeding and death, usually within 24 hours. Eventually the epidemic devastates the town, with the Ministry of Health running riot in a desperate attempt to stop the plague.

The cause of the nosebleeds can be traced to a substance known only as the "Special Stuff", a highly addictive and mysterious foodstuff served by demonic butcher Hilary Briss, which becomes deadly when cut with sandwich paste. However, the surviving local residents mistakenly accuse Edward and Tubbs of spreading the disease and burn the Local Shop to the ground.

In the third and final series, several of the residents of Royston Vasey are involved in a traffic collision, which leaves Lance Longthorne and Laurence Llewelyn-Bowen dead, and Geoff Tipps facially disfigured. The travelling circus also returns.

In the film The League of Gentlemen's Apocalypse, the town is on the verge of destruction when the League of Gentlemen – Jeremy Dyson, Mark Gatiss, Steve Pemberton, and Reece Shearsmith – agree to stop writing for Royston Vasey. This causes meteorites to rain from the sky until the entire town is razed to the ground. The destruction of Royston Vasey can only be prevented when all four of the writers are killed, but it transpires that the entire ordeal was conceived by Dyson while unconscious in a hospital.

In the anniversary specials, which aired on BBC Two in December 2017, the town faces being merged into a neighbouring area under boundary changes, which would wipe Royston Vasey off the map.

==== Other ====
The League of Gentlemen book, A Local Book for Local People, released between the second and third series, describes Royston Vasey's history in a brochure, from its beginnings, as mentioned in an appendix to the Domesday Book as "an hutte with a pigge outside" to the construction of the town hall in the late 1930s, as designed by Albert Speer. The endpapers of the book show real maps of northern England turned upside down and with fictional place names, Royston Vasey corresponding to the real town of Settle, North Yorkshire (close by to Panties/Giggleswick).

The town's most featured landmarks include the Local Shop, an angelic war memorial, H. Briss & Son Butchers, the St Mary of Bethlehem hospital, the Windermere B&B, and the local Job Centre.

== Filming location ==
Filming of the television series mainly took place in the Derbyshire village of Hadfield, located in a Pennines valley. The League considered a number of filming locations before settling on Hadfield. Another town to feature prominently in the series was Bacup in Rossendale, and the West Yorkshire town of Todmorden was used for some later scenes. Other locations include Glossop, Gamesley, and Hope Valley in Derbyshire; Marsden and Sowerby Bridge in West Yorkshire; and Mottram in Greater Manchester.

The "Local Shop" is a purpose-built building on nearby Marsden Moor.

== Characters ==
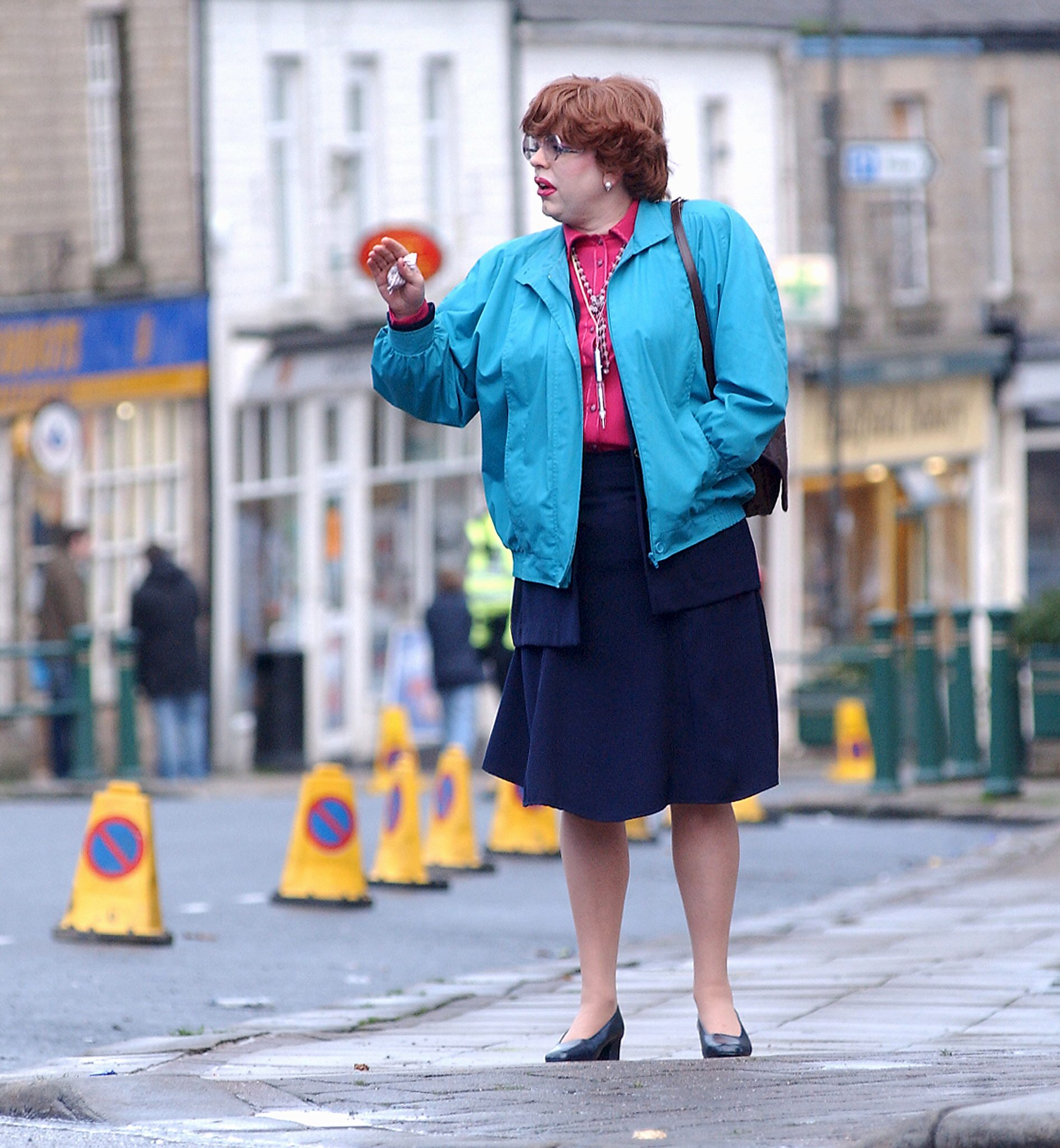
Steve Pemberton in character as Pauline Campbell-Jones

The League of Gentlemen have played in total nearly a hundred characters, many created in the early stage shows, others during the span of the television series and some especially for the team's film. Most of the characters live in Royston Vasey.

== Episodes ==
Series	Episodes	Originally released	
Series	Episodes	First released	Last released
1	6	11 January 1999	15 February 1999
2	6	14 January 2000	18 February 2000
Christmas Special		27 December 2000	
3	6	26 September 2002	24 October 2002
Anniversary Specials	3	18 December 2017	20 December 2017

As well as the normal episodes, The Making of the League of Gentlemen documentary was broadcast on 27 October 2002.

=== Series 1 (1999) ===
No.	Title	Original release date
1	"Welcome to Royston Vasey"	11 January 1999
Benjamin Denton arrives in Royston Vasey to stay with his relatives: Uncle Harvey; Auntie Val; and twin cousins Chloe and Radclyffe. His friend Martin drops into Tubbs and Edward Tattsyrup's local shop; and we are introduced to pals/workmates Geoff, Brian, and Mike; and to Restart Course leader Pauline.
2	"The Road to Royston Vasey"	18 January 1999
Tubbs and Edward deal with a pair of construction workers on the new road. Meanwhile, Pauline continues her brutal treatment of the unemployed; and we are introduced to Les McQueen, a former musician whose glory days are long behind him.
3	"Nightmare in Royston Vasey"	25 January 1999
Mr. Chinnery, a veterinarian, tries a new method of treating an old woman's pet tortoise's anaemia, and Geoff goes to Lance's joke shop to get a treat to secure his being best man at Mike's wedding.
4	"The Beast of Royston Vasey"	1 February 1999
Primary school drama group "Legz Akimbo" give a talk on homosexuality entitled "Everybody Out". Meanwhile, the zoo goes missing and the corpse of a grotesque beast is found on the moor.
5	"Love Comes to Royston Vasey"	8 February 1999
While Mike and Cheryl tie the knot and Geoff gives a memorable best-man speech, Barbara places an ad in the lonely-hearts column and gets a reply from an unexpected caller. Also, Henry and Ally torment a man when watching Trois Couleurs Bleu in the cinema.
6	"Escape from Royston Vasey"	15 February 1999
Tubbs and Edward find out that the construction manager for the dreaded "New Road" is their son David, who has not been "local" in the long time since he left to attend university in London. Mr. Chinnery disembowels a cow.

=== Series 2 (2000) ===
No.	Title	Original release date
7	"Destination: Royston Vasey"	14 January 2000
Papa Lazarou brings his Pandemonium Carnival to Royston Vasey and finds that the locals are even stranger than he is. Pauline meets her replacement at the Job Centre and Uncle Harvey's new toad seems to have mythical powers.
8	"Lust for Royston Vasey"	21 January 2000
A tour bus of German exchange students, led by Herr Lipp, arrives in Royston Vasey. Pauline and Mickey get jobs at Burger Me. Dr Chinnery attempts a little dental work on an iguana. Uncle Harvey and Auntie Val nurse Benjamin back to health.
9	"A Plague on Royston Vasey"	28 January 2000
Tubbs and Edward take inventory at The Local Shop, and decide that David needs a bride. After being sacked from Burger Me, Pauline and Mickey confront Ross at the Job Centre. Hilary is outraged when Maurice brings his wife to a top secret meeting. A young couple signs a contract with Pop to live in Royston Vasey.
10	"Death in Royston Vasey"	4 February 2000
Benjamin wakes up to find that it is his aunt and uncle's 'Nude Day' and they insist he joins them. A flatulent dog causes concern for Dr Chinnery; Edward and Tubbs start their trip to find David a wife.
11	"Anarchy in Royston Vasey"	11 February 2000
Pauline is still holding Ross hostage at the Job Centre, but no one has noticed. Les discovers Crême Brulée have reunited without him. Tubbs and Edward have traveled to the local supermarket in search of a 'No-Tail' for David. Maurice arrives at Hilary's shop in a panic, worrying about the health inspections, while Eunice's sandwiches are suddenly a hot item.
12	"Royston Vasey and the Monster from Hell"	18 February 2000
Barbara and David's big day has arrived, but Royston Vasey is in chaos from the epidemic. The police have a good idea what is causing the deadly illness, though the torch-wielding locals have errantly decided to take care of matters themselves. Meanwhile, Dr. Chinnery accidentally electrocutes a falcon, Judee discovers that Iris is her mother and Benjamin escapes the clutches of his Auntie Val and Uncle Harvey and gathers the locals to destroy the Local Shop.

=== Christmas Special (2000) ===
Title	Original release date
"Yule Never Leave"	27 December 2000
Bernice listens to three different disturbing tales: Charlie talks about a recurring nightmare involving Stella and a voodoo spell; a tramp talks about how he came to suspect that Herr Lipp was a vampire; Mr Chinnery recounts how his great-grandfather became infected with an ancestral curse which now affects him after an incident with monkey balls.

=== Series 3 (2002) ===
No.	Title	Original release date
13	"The Lesbian and the Monkey"	26 September 2002
Ross springs Pauline from jail – provided she can find evidence to convict Mickey and get him off the Dole.
14	"The One-Armed Man Is King"	3 October 2002
Lance goes to hospital in order to have a second arm grafted onto his body. He receives a woman's arm that has a life of its own.
15	"Turn Again Geoff Tipps"	10 October 2002
Fired from his job, Geoff heads down to London to become a stand-up comedian. Meanwhile, Legz Akimbo practise role-playing for a play about disability.
16	"The Medusa Touch"	17 October 2002
Alvin and Sunny host a small group of fellow "Sexplorers" to a trial of a new auto-erotic asphyxiation machine. While Alvin slips away to tryst with his mistress, everyone else accidentally dies.
17	"Beauty and the Beast (Or, Come into My Parlour)"	24 October 2002
Charlie and Judee team up to form their own beauty parlour, but Charlie ends up performing hand-jobs for male customers and ends up falling in love with one, Tony.
18	"How the Elephant Got Its Trunk"	31 October 2002
Vinnie dies trying to collect a plastic bag, so Reenie hires a new charity-shop helper, Keith Drop. When Brian tells Keith that his wife went missing when the circus came to town, it is discovered that Keith has a secret identity.

=== Anniversary Specials (2017) ===
Title	Original release date
"Return To Royston Vasey"	18 December 2017
Some familiar faces return to the town of Royston Vasey, with old scores to settle and some old friends to dig up – with more bad blood than an abattoir with septicaemia.
"Save Royston Vasey"	19 December 2017
Boundary changes threaten to wipe the town from the map forever. The fight to save Royston Vasey from administrative annihilation comes from unexpected and surprising directions – all of them local.
"Royston Vasey Mon Amour"	20 December 2017
The local authorities, local newspaper and local police all play their part as the developing situation in Royston Vasey reaches its earth-shattering climax. What dark forces have been unleashed in the amphibarium?

== Film ==
The film was made in 2005. The plot is that Royston Vasey is coming to an end and that the locals appear in the real world to try to save it. In the beginning Jeremy Dyson is killed by Tubbs, Edward and Papa Lazarou.

== Live tours ==
Year	Title	Shows	Notes
2000–2001	The League of Gentlemen: A Local Show for Local People	57 dates	DVD release
2005	The League of Gentlemen Are Behind You!	38 dates	DVD release
2018	The League of Gentlemen Live Again!	48 shows	Released as a BBC Two special

== Reception ==
In 2003, its creators were listed in The Observer as among the 50 funniest acts in British comedy. In 2004, Radio Times listed Papa Lazarou as the 8th funniest comedy sketch of all time.

The series was cited as an inspiration for the later Canadian television series Death Comes to Town, a reunion project for the Canadian sketch comedy troupe The Kids in the Hall.

In June 2020, during the George Floyd protests, the show was withdrawn from distribution on Netflix due to the character Papa Lazarou's makeup resembling blackface. The series was kept on the BBC iPlayer streaming service but a content warning was added before each episode.

=== Accolades ===
- BAFTA award
- Royal Television Society award
- Golden Rose of Montreux
- A Very English Caper.

== Books ==
- A Local Book for Local People (2000) London: 4th Estate, ISBN 1-84115-346-X
- The League of Gentlemen: Scripts and That (2003) London: BBC Worldwide, ISBN 0-563-48775-5
- The League of Gentlemen's Book of Precious Things (2007) London: Prion, ISBN 1-85375-621-0

== See also ==
- List of films based on British sitcoms
