= The Marvell College =

Coordinates: 53°46′18.1″N 0°15′35.5″W

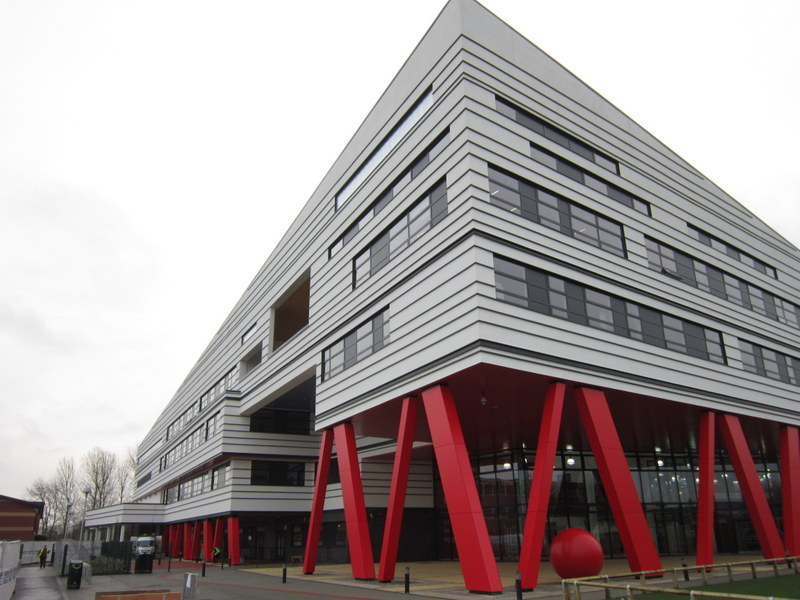

Location
- Barham Road; Kingston upon Hull, East Riding of Yorkshire, HU9 4EE; England

Information
- Type: Academy
- Established: 1953
- Local authority: Hull City Council
- Trust: Hull Collaborative Academy Trust
- Department for Education URN: 142391 Tables
- Ofsted: Reports
- Headteacher: Damian Matthews
- Gender: Co-educational
- Age: 11 to 16
- Website: http://www.themarvellcollege.com/

The Marvell College is a co-educational secondary school located in Kingston upon Hull in the East Riding of Yorkshire, England. The school is named after Andrew Marvell, a 17th century metaphysical poet and politician.

The school opened in 1953 as Barham High School and Jervis High School. The schools were named after HMS Barham and HMS Jervis, former Royal Navy war ships. Barham was exclusively for girls and Jervis exclusively for boys. The two schools were later combined into a single co-educational school which was later renamed first Andrew Marvell School and then Andrew Marvell College. Previously a foundation school administered by Birmingham City Council, in September 2016 Andrew Marvell College converted to academy status and was renamed The Marvell College. The school is now sponsored by the Hull Collaborative Academy Trust.

The Marvell College offers GCSEs, BTECs and Cambridge Nationals as programmes of study for pupils. The school relocated into new buildings in January 2013. Since this time the school has made its facilities (mainly sports facilities) available to the local community outside of school hours.

== Notable alumni ==
- Reece Shearsmith, Actor and Comedian.
- Paul Cooke, Rugby League Player for Hull FC and Hull KR.
