= The League of Gentlemen's Apocalypse =

2005 British comedy film

- Theatrical release poster
- Directed by: Steve Bendelack
- Written by: Jeremy Dyson; Mark Gatiss; Steve Pemberton; Reece Shearsmith
- Based on: The League of Gentlemen by Jeremy Dyson; Mark Gatiss; Steve Pemberton; Reece Shearsmith
- Produced by: Greg Brenman; Ed Guiney
- Starring: Mark Gatiss; Steve Pemberton; Reece Shearsmith; Peter Kay; Victoria Wood; Simon Pegg; Michael Sheen
- Cinematography: Rob Kitzmann
- Edited by: Tony Cranstoun
- Music by: Joby Talbot
- Production companies: Universal Pictures; FilmFour; Tiger Aspect Pictures; Hell's Kitchen International
- Distributed by: Magnolia Pictures (United States); United International Pictures (international)
- Release date: 3 June 2005 (United Kingdom)
- Running time: 92 minutes
- Countries: United Kingdom; Ireland
- Language: English
- Budget: £4.2 million
- Box office: $2.4 million

The League of Gentlemen's Apocalypse is a 2005 disaster horror comedy film based on the British television series The League of Gentlemen. It is directed by Steve Bendelack at his directorial debut and written by the series' cast along with Jeremy Dyson.

Starring Mark Gatiss, Steve Pemberton and Reece Shearsmith, who reprise their roles from the TV series, along with Michael Sheen, Victoria Wood, David Warner, Alan Morrissey, Bruno Langley, Bernard Hill, Simon Pegg and Peter Kay who appear in guest roles, the film follows the series' characters as they enter the real world and meet their creators while the setting, the fictional town of Royston Vasey, is facing a series of apocalyptic events.

It is a British-Irish venture produced by FilmFour, Tiger Aspect Films and Universal Pictures. The film was released on 3 June 2005 in the United Kingdom.

== Plot ==
Jeremy Dyson (played by Michael Sheen) proposes to the other members of The League of Gentlemen a new series in which everyone in Royston Vasey wakes up with a tail. The other writers are keen to move on to new projects instead. He is confronted by three characters from the series - Papa Lazarou, Edward and Tubbs - and tries to run but falls off a cliff.

At the church the vicar, Bernice Woodall, tells Pauline Campbell-Jones and Mr. Chinnery that there are signs of The Apocalypse occurring. Hilary Briss has escaped from prison and holds Herr Lipp hostage, using him to hijack a car driven by Geoff Tipps. Fleeing fireballs, Briss leads them through a door in the church crypt, emerging in the real town of Hadfield, Derbyshire, the setting for Royston Vasey in The League of Gentlemen television series.

With the situation explained to them by Lazarou and the Tattsyrups, Briss, Herr Lipp and Geoff Tipps travel to London. Lipp pretends to be his creator, Steve Pemberton, and goes to his home where he discovers Pemberton has been neglecting his family. Briss and Tipps read through The League of Gentlemen's new project, a historical horror called The King's Evil, while Briss chases after an escapee Pemberton and re-captures him.

Returning to the hideout, Briss discovers that Tipps has written himself into The King's Evil as the hero. Lipp meanwhile has become deeply attached to Pemberton's family, in particular his children. He searches Pemberton's belongings for his notes.

Briss takes Pemberton to Hadfield, where Pemberton telephones Reece Shearsmith. Shearsmith thinks that Briss is playing a joke on him, so Briss comes to the phone. Shearsmith initially believes that Mark Gatiss is joining in on the "joke" when he opens a door and Gatiss is standing right in front of him. Shearsmith and Gatiss find and capture Herr Lipp, and they travel to Hadfield.

They go back to Royston Vasey via the dimensional door and swap hostages, but Pemberton is killed by a stray gunshot. Dr Erasmus Pea, the villain of The King's Evil, tries to persuade Briss to leave Royston Vasey and join him, but Briss refuses. Pea kills his fellow characters and turns them into a gigantic homunculus, which Briss fights. Shearsmith and Gatiss climb up the wall of the church to escape but Shearsmith falls to his death.

Briss kills the monster but is stabbed in the back by Pea. Before dying he tells Tipps that he is the only one who can save Royston Vasey. Tipps fights Pea while Gatiss tries to return to the real world but is held at gunpoint by Lipp. Tipps kills Pea using part of the homunculus. In the church, Lipp says he will kill Gatiss. The other characters try to dissuade him, saying that once all the writers are dead, Royston Vasey will cease to exist and they will die.

Lipp claims that they will in fact be better off, because as long as they're controlled by someone else they have no free will and can never change for the better. Tipps tells Lipp that because he saved the day and can therefore change, Lipp need not kill Gatiss. He persuades Lipp to hand him the gun, only for Tipps to accidentally fire it and kill Gatiss.

With all the writers now apparently dead, the residents of Royston Vasey prepare for the worst. Instead, everything calms down and The Apocalypse is averted. The characters realise they now have free will. Herr Lipp adopts some orphaned children, the vet, Mr Chinnery, finds a rabbit and is able to take care of it without killing it, and Bernice and Pauline become romantically involved.

Tipps leaves the church, waving goodbye to Edward, Tubbs and Papa Lazarou. It appears that Royston Vasey can continue to exist independently of its dead creators. In a mid-credits scene, Dyson is revealed to be alive but in a coma after falling off the cliff. Everyone else in the world now has a tail.

== Characters ==
Nearly all of the action involves the characters Herr Lipp, Hilary Briss and Geoff Tipps, played by Steve Pemberton, Mark Gatiss and Reece Shearsmith respectively. Other characters such as Mr Chinnery, Pauline Campbell-Jones, Mickey Michaels, Barbara Dixon, Reverend Bernice Woodall, Tubbs & Edward Tattsyrup and Papa Lazarou also feature.

The actors also play themselves, and three other characters from their new project, a 17th-century Gothic horror entitled The King's Evil. Visual effects are used to show several characters played by the same actor interacting at once. The fourth member of The League of Gentlemen, Jeremy Dyson, who is not an actor, is played by Michael Sheen.

== Cast ==
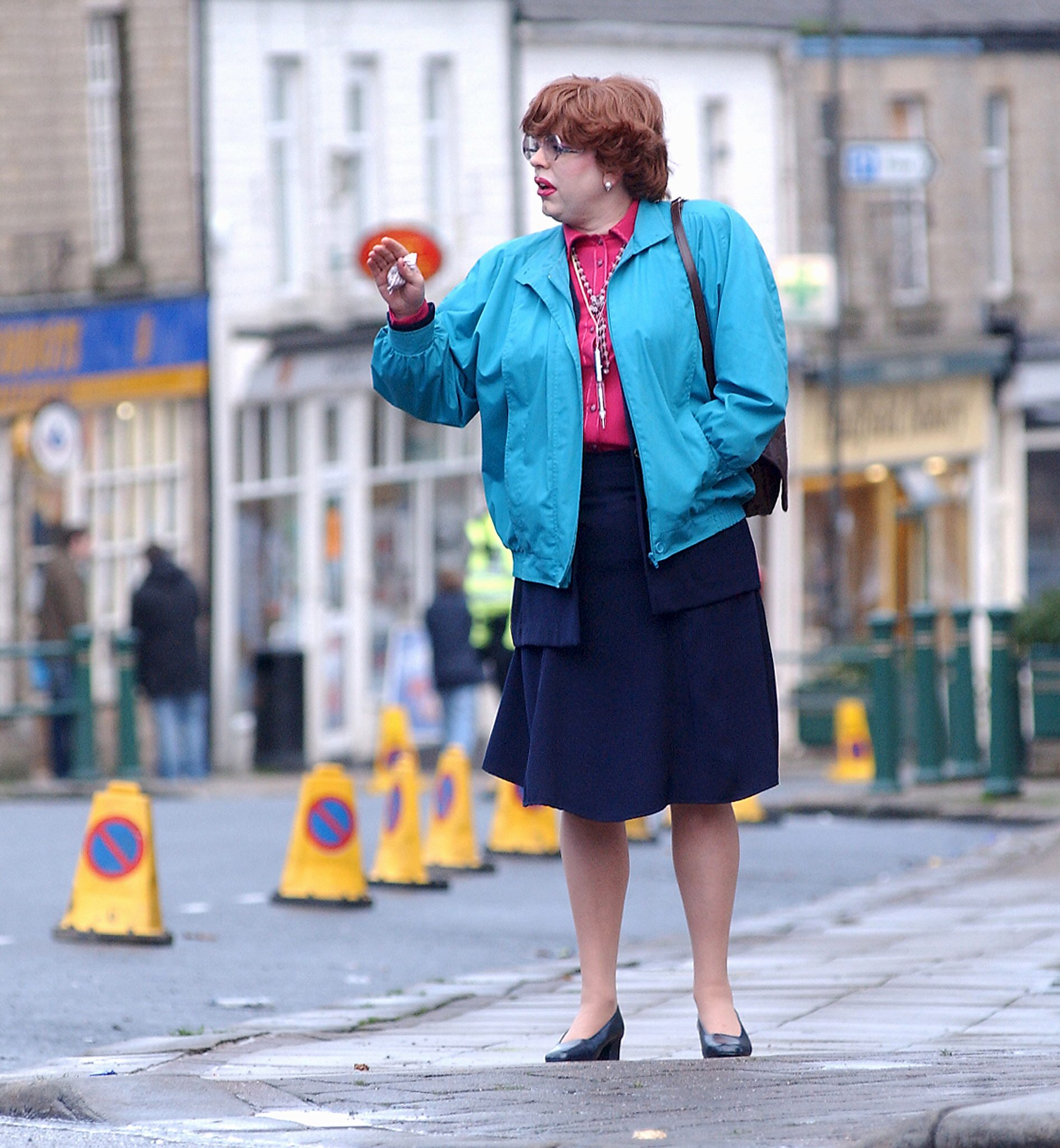
Steve Pemberton in character as Pauline during the filming of The League of Gentlemen's Apocalypse

- Mark Gatiss as himself / Matthew Chinnery / Hilary Briss / Mickey / Sir Nicholas Sheet-Lightning
- Steve Pemberton as himself / Tubbs / Pauline / Herr Lipp / Lemuel Blizzard
- Reece Shearsmith as himself / Edward / Papa Lazarou / Geoff / Bernice / Father Halfhearte / Red Devil
- Michael Sheen as Jeremy Dyson
- Emily Woof as Lindsay
- Danielle Tilley as Dahlia
- Bruno Langley as Damon
- Alan Morrissey as Johnny
- Liana O'Cleirigh as Claire
- Victoria Wood as Queen Mary II
- David Warner as Dr. Erasmus Pea
- Bernard Hill as King William III
- Simon Pegg as Peter Cow
- Peter Kay as Simon Pig
- Liam Cunningham as Director
- Rachel Rath (uncredited) as Homunculus

== Reception ==
The film premiered to generally positive reviews, with review-aggregation website Rotten Tomatoes shows that 83% of critics gave the film a positive review, with an average of 6.8 out of 10, based on 8 reviews.

== Soundtrack ==
Track listing

1. "Apocalypse Theme"- 1:47
2. "Little Brown Fish"- 3:45
3. "Leaving for London"- 1:03
4. "Meteors"- 2:25
5. "Pig Funeral"- 0:52
6. "Storm Over Royston Vasey"- 1:21
7. "Stripped Down Theme"- 0:57
8. "Have You Seen Me?"- 1:33
9. "Dr Pea"- 2:00
10. "Into the Crypt"- 1:21
11. "An Humunculus"- 4:30
12. "The Kings' Evil"- 1:55
13. "Herr Lipp in the Attic"- 1:32
14. "Herr Lipp Unmasked"- 2:21
15. "Arise Sir Geoffrey"- 1:19
16. "Back in Royston Vasey"- 3:54
17. "Hilary Versus the Humunculus"- 3:09
18. "It's a Miracle"- 3:02
19. "End Titles"- 3:26

^{Soundtrack references:}
