= The League of Gentlemen Live Again! =

2018 comedy tour

- Tour by The League of Gentlemen
- Tour poster
- Start date: 6 August 2018
- End date: 29 September 2018
- Legs: 1
- No. of shows: 47

The League of Gentlemen concert chronology
- The League of Gentlemen Are Behind You! (2005); The League of Gentlemen Live Again!

The League of Gentlemen Live Again! was a comedy stage show by The League of Gentlemen (made up of Mark Gatiss, Reece Shearsmith, Steve Pemberton and Jeremy Dyson). It was their first stage show since The League of Gentlemen Are Behind You! in 2005, and followed the 2017 BBC Two television specials celebrating the 20th anniversary of the show. It was presented by Phil McIntyre Entertainment.

The tour was filmed at the Eventim Apollo, London in September 2018 and was released on 19 November 2018 before being broadcast on BBC Two on 21 April 2019.

== Tour dates ==
Date	City	Country	Venue
6 August 2018	Barnstaple	England	Queen's Theatre
7 August 2018	Barnstaple	England	Queen's Theatre
8 August 2018	Weston-super-Mare	England	The Playhouse
9 August 2018	Weston-super-Mare	England	The Playhouse
10 August 2018	Exeter	England	Northcott Theatre
11 August 2018	Torquay	England	Princess Theatre
13 August 2018	Portsmouth	England	Guildhall
14 August 2018	Cambridge	England	Corn Exchange
15 August 2018	Ipswich	England	Regent Theatre
17 August 2018	Dublin	Ireland	3Arena
18 August 2018	Belfast	Northern Ireland	SSE Arena
20 August 2018	Buxton	England	Opera House
21 August 2018	Southport	England	Southport Theatre
22 August 2018	York	England	Barbican
23 August 2018	Carlisle	England	Sands Centre
24 August 2018	Sunderland	England	Empire Theatre
25 August 2018	Sunderland	England	Empire Theatre
26 August 2018	Sunderland	England	Empire Theatre
28 August 2018	Glasgow	Scotland	SEC Armadillo
29 August 2018	Glasgow	Scotland	SEC Armadillo
30 August 2018	Edinburgh	Scotland	Playhouse
31 August 2018	Leeds	England	First Direct Arena
1 September 2018	Manchester	England	Manchester Arena
2 September 2018	Nottingham	England	Motorpoint Arena
4 September 2018	Kingston upon Hull	England	Bonus Arena
5 September 2018	Oxford	England	New Theatre
6 September 2018	Cardiff	Wales	Motorpoint Arena
7 September 2018	Cardiff	Wales	Motorpoint Arena
8 September 2018	Plymouth	England	Pavilions
9 September 2018	Nottingham	England	Motorpoint Arena
11 September 2018	Brighton	England	Brighton Centre
12 September 2018	Brighton	England	Brighton Centre
13 September 2018	Birmingham	England	Arena
14 September 2018	Birmingham	England	Arena
15 September 2018	Leeds	England	First Direct Arena
16 September 2018	Liverpool	England	First Direct Arena
18 September 2018	Blackpool	England	Opera House
19 September 2018	Sheffield	England	City Hall
20 September 2018	Sheffield	England	City Hall
21 September 2018	Sheffield	England	City Hall
22 September 2018	Manchester	England	O2 Apollo
23 September 2018	London	England	The O2
25 September 2018	Bournemouth	England	International Centre
26 September 2018	London	England	Eventim Apollo
27 September 2018	London	England	Eventim Apollo
28 September 2018	London	England	Eventim Apollo
29 September 2018	London	England	Eventim Apollo
