= Rachel Rath =

Irish actress

Rachel Rath (born 2 October 1976, Gorey, County Wexford, Ireland) is an Irish film, television and theatre actress.

She has appeared in the films The Actors (2003), Laws of Attraction (2004), Ella Enchanted (2004) and Anton (2007). She has worked on a number of occasions with novelist and playwright Irvine Welsh, including starring in the European premiere of his play Babylon Heights and featuring in his short film directorial debut Nuts.

She also appeared in three feature films for Robbie Moffat: Cycle (2005), Axe Raiders (2005), and Dark Side of Heaven (2006). She founded 'The Attic Studio' with director Graham Cantwell in 2003, a network of Irish-based actors, writers and directors.

== Filmography ==
- Anton (2007) Detective Byrne
- The League of Gentlemen's Apocalypse (2005) Homunculus
- Ella Enchanted (2004) Moss the Elf
- Laws of Attraction (2004) Chambermaid
- The Actors (2003) Actor in Richard III

== Television series and guest spots ==
- Bachelors Walk (2003) - Waitress
