= The League of Gentlemen Are Behind You! =

Stage show by The League of Gentlemen

- Tour by The League of Gentlemen
- Start date: 12 October 2005
- End date: 14 December 2005
- Legs: 1
- No. of shows: 53

The League of Gentlemen concert chronology
- The League of Gentlemen: A Local Show For Local People (2001-02); The League of Gentlemen Are Behind You!; The League of Gentlemen Live Again! (2018)

The League of Gentlemen Are Behind You! was a pantomime-themed stage show by The League of Gentlemen. It was their second major UK tour; it premiered in 2005. The whimsical, pantomime nature of the show was a departure from their trademark dark humour. Almost all the material performed was new and original.

A performance filmed at the Hammersmith Apollo, Hammersmith, was released on DVD Video.

== Shows ==
The tour dates were as follows;

Date	City	Country	Venue
12 October 2005	Bristol	England	Bristol Hippodrome
13 October 2005	Bristol	England	Bristol Hippodrome
14 October 2005	Bristol	England	Bristol Hippodrome
15 October 2005	Bristol	England	Bristol Hippodrome
17 October 2005	Manchester	England	Carling Apollo Manchester
18 October 2005	Manchester	England	Carling Apollo Manchester
19 October 2005	Manchester	England	Carling Apollo Manchester
20 October 2005	Scarborough	England	Futurist Theatre
21 October 2005	Birmingham	England	National Indoor Arena
22 October 2005	Birmingham	England	National Indoor Arena
24 October 2005	Nottingham	England	Theatre Royal, Nottingham
25 October 2005	Nottingham	England	Theatre Royal, Nottingham
26 October 2005	Leicester	England	De Montfort Hall
27 October 2005	Ipswich	England	Regent Theatre, Ipswich
28 October 2005	Ipswich	England	Regent Theatre, Ipswich
30 October 2005	Cambridge	England	Cambridge Corn Exchange
31 October 2005	Blackpool	England	Opera House Theatre, Blackpool
1 November 2005	Blackburn	England	King George's Hall, Blackburn
3 November 2005	Oxford	England	New Theatre Oxford
4 November 2005	Oxford	England	New Theatre Oxford
5 November 2005	Bournemouth	England	Bournemouth International Centre
8 November 2005	Newcastle upon Tyne	England	Newcastle City Hall
9 November 2005	Newcastle upon Tyne	England	Newcastle City Hall
11 November 2005	Sunderland	England	Sunderland Empire Theatre
12 November 2005	Sunderland	England	Sunderland Empire Theatre
13 November 2005	Glasgow	Scotland	Scottish Event Campus
15 November 2005	Southport	England	Southport Theatre
16 November 2005	Blackburn	England	King George's Hall, Blackburn
17 November 2005	Grimsby	England	Grimsby Auditorium
18 November 2005	Brighton	England	Brighton Centre
19 November 2005	Brighton	England	Brighton Centre
21 November 2005	Grimsby	England	Grimsby Auditorium
22 November 2005	Bradford	England	St George's Hall, Bradford
23 November 2005	Bradford	England	St George's Hall, Bradford
24 November 2005	Bradford	England	St George's Hall, Bradford
25 November 2005	Llandudno	Wales	Venue Cymru
26 November 2005	Llandudno	Wales	Venue Cymru
27 November 2005	Croydon	England	Fairfield Halls
28 November 2005	Plymouth	England	Plymouth Pavilions
30 November 2005	Southend-on-Sea	England	Cliffs Pavilion
1 December 2005	London	England	Hammersmith Apollo
2 December 2005	London	England	Hammersmith Apollo
3 December 2005	London	England	Hammersmith Apollo
4 December 2005	London	England	Hammersmith Apollo
5 December 2005	Cambridge	England	Cambridge Corn Exchange
6 December 2005	Portsmouth	England	Portsmouth Guildhall
7 December 2005	Manchester	England	Carling Apollo Manchester
8 December 2005	London	England	Hammersmith Apollo
9 December 2005	London	England	Hammersmith Apollo
10 December 2005	London	England	Hammersmith Apollo
12 December 2005	Leicester	England	De Montfort Hall
13 December 2005	Sheffield	England	Sheffield City Hall
14 December 2005	Sheffield	England	Sheffield City Hall
