= A Local Book for Local People =

2000 British comedy book

- Language: English
- Genre: Comedy
- Set in: Royston Vasey
- Published: 2000 (4th Estate)
- Publication place: England
- Media type: Print
- ISBN: 978-1-84115-346-9
- OCLC: 59573688

A Local Book For Local People is a 2000 book by the British comedy team behind The League of Gentlemen. It is similar to comedy books by Monty Python and The Goodies in that it is a collection of loose material collected in a scrap book format. The material is connected by Tubbs, who has found the various snippets on the moors.

The Local Book is notable in that the material is much more risqué than the television series.

== Reception ==
Mark Sanderson of the Evening Standard called the book "handsomely produced". The Courier-Mail reviewer John Cokley found the book to be "rude, lewd, obscene, anti-nature, satirical, hardly funny". David Chapman of Worcestershire, West Midlands, Herefordshire, and Shropshire Counties Publications found the book to have "a peculiar Pandora's box" of various items.

Chris Titley, a writer for The Press, thought Local Book was "the most imaginative of the TV books" in the vein of the trademark Monty Python humor. Leicester Mercury said of the book, "you'll just laugh. Unstoppably, hysterically." Martin Rowson of The Independent found the work to be "over-produced and over-designed to the point of total unreadability" and recommended against reading it.
