= Southport Theatre =

Coordinates: 53.652°N 3.006°W

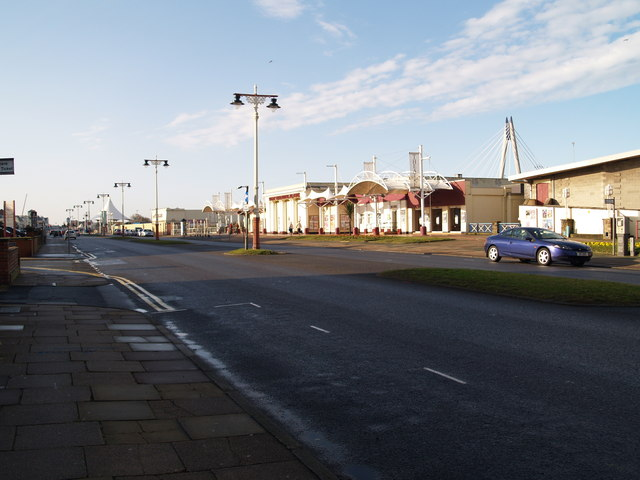
Floral Hall and Southport Theatre Comp

Southport Theatre was a theatre in Southport, England owned by Sefton Council. The theatre presented a programme of touring shows, opera and children's shows throughout the year. The theatre was also a popular choice for national and international conferences & exhibitions and underwent a £40m renovation as part of the overall redevelopment of the Southport area.

Bliss Space (Southport) Ltd, the lease holder and operating company for Southport Theatre & Convention Centre (STCC) went into liquidation on 19 May 2020.
