= Psychobitches =

- Genre: Sketch show, comedy, drama
- Written by: Jeremy Dyson; Bert Tyler-Moore; George Jeffrie; Ben Cavey; Pippa Brown; Ali Crockatt; Lucy Montgomery; David Scott; Seb Cardinal; Dustin Demri-Burns
- Directed by: Jeremy Dyson
- Starring: Various
- Country of origin: United Kingdom
- Original language: English
- No. of series: 2
- No. of episodes: 11+Pilot

Production
- Executive producers: Saskia Schuster; Ben Cavey; Lucy Lumsden; Sophie Clarke-Jervoise
- Producer: Pippa Brown
- Editor: Peter Hallworth
- Production company: Tiger Aspect Productions

Original release
- Network: Sky Arts
- Release: 21 June 2012 – 23 December 2014

Psychobitches is a Sky Arts British sketch comedy show directed by Jeremy Dyson, in which famous women from history and fiction seek help from a psychologist (played by Rebecca Front).

== Broadcast history ==
Psychobitches was originally aired as a one-off pilot in 2012, as part of the Sky Arts Playhouse Presents self-contained TV plays. The pilot was originally aired on 21 June 2012 as episode 11 of series one of Playhouse Presents and lasted 30 minutes.

After the successful pilot, a five-part series was released in 2013 during series two of Playhouse Presents (episodes 7, 9, 11, 13 and 14).

Following the success of the first series, a full six-episode series was commissioned by Sky Arts as its own entity and was aired from 25 November 2014 with a double bill.

== Regular cast ==
The cast featured Rebecca Front as The Therapist, with Sharon Horgan, Julia Davis, Michelle Gomez, Catherine Tate, Samantha Spiro, Frances Barber, Katy Brand, Selina Griffiths, Morgana Robinson, Seb Cardinal and Dustin Demri-Burns all playing multiple roles.

== Episodes ==
Series	Episodes	Originally released	
Series	Episodes	First released	Last released
Pilot	1	21 June 2012	
1	5	30 May 2013	27 June 2013
2	6	25 November 2014	23 December 2014

=== Pilot (2012) as part of Playhouse Presents ===
Title	Directed by	Written by	Original release date
"Playhouse Presents: Psychobitches"	Jeremy Dyson	Jeremy Dyson, Laurence Rickard, Simon Carlyle, Morwenna Banks, Bert Tyler-Moore, George Jeffrie	21 June 2012
Cast: Rebecca Front as the Therapist, Catherine Tate as Eva Braun and Édith Piaf, Sharon Horgan as Jane Austen and Frida Kahlo, Katy Brand as Joan of Arc and George Eliot, Sheila Reid as Mother Teresa, Sam Spiro as Mary Whitehouse and Judy Garland, Selina Griffiths as Beatrix Potter, Andy Nyman as Sarah, Abraham's wife and Kathy Burke as The Mona Lisa

=== Series 1 (2013) as part of Playhouse Presents ===
No. overall	No. in series	Title	Directed by	Written by	Original release date
1	1	"Playhouse Presents: Psychobitches Part One"	Jeremy Dyson	Jeremy Dyson, Simon Carlyle, Bert Tyler-Moore, George Jeffrie, Ali Crockatt, Pelham Levy, Lucy Montgomery, David Scott, Freddy Syborn, Holly Walsh	30 May 2013
Cast: Rebecca Front as the Therapist, Mark Gatiss as Joan Crawford, Frances Barber as Bette Davis, Llewella Gideon as Rosa Parks, Samantha Spiro as Audrey Hepburn, Julia Davis as Sylvia Plath, Sharon D. Clarke as Nina Simone, Katy Brand as Emily Brontë, Selina Griffiths as Charlotte Brontë, Sarah Solemani as Anne Brontë, Sharon Horgan as Eva Peron, Katy Brand as Jacqueline du Pre, Sheila Reid as Margot Fonteyn
2	2	"Playhouse Presents: Psychobitches Part Two"	Jeremy Dyson	Jeremy Dyson, Bert Tyler-Moore, George Jeffrie, Ali Crockatt, Lucy Montgomery, David Scott, Jessie Cave	6 June 2013
Cast: Rebecca Front as the Therapist, Selina Griffiths as Beatrix Potter, Katy Brand as Diana Dors, Samantha Spiro as Marilyn Monroe, Frances Barber as Doris Stokes, Samantha Spiro as Mary, mother of Jesus, Mathew Baynton as Jesus, Sharon Horgan as Virginia Woolf and Cleopatra, Sharon D Clarke as Bessie Smith, Steve Pemberton as Dian Fossey and Julia Davis as Enid Blyton
3	3	"Playhouse Presents: Psychobitches Part Three"	Jeremy Dyson	Jeremy Dyson, Bert Tyler-Moore, George Jeffrie, Ali Crockatt, Lucy Montgomery, David Scott, Holly Walsh, Julia Davis, Jamie Lennox, Louis Waymouth	13 June 2013
Cast: Rebecca Front as the Therapist, Samantha Spiro as Liz Taylor, Selina Griffiths as Amalia Freud, Joanna Scanlan as Barbara Woodhouse, Reece Shearsmith as Old Mother Shipton, Julia Davis as Joy Adamson, Jack Whitehall as Diana Spencer, Sharon Horgan as Leni Riefenstahl, Selina Griffiths as Marie Curie, Sharon Horgan as Madame de Pompadour and Samantha Spiro as Golda Meir
4	4	"Playhouse Presents: Psychobitches Part Four"	Jeremy Dyson	Jeremy Dyson, Ali Crockatt, David Scott, Freddy Syborn, Derren Litten	20 June 2013
Cast: Rebecca Front as the Therapist, Ted Robbins as Emmeline Pankhurst, Samantha Spiro as Barbara Castle, Julia Davis as Helen of Troy, Michelle Gomez as Mary, Queen of Scots, Tamsin Egerton as Nancy Spungen, Sharon Horgan as Eve, Julia Davis as Helen Keller and Katy Brand as Mary Shelley
5	5	"Playhouse Presents: Psychobitches Part Five"	Jeremy Dyson	Jeremy Dyson, Bert Tyler-Moore, George Jeffrie, Ali Crockatt, Lucy Montgomery, David Scott, Derren Litten, Kathy Burke	27 June 2013
Cast: Rebecca Front as the Therapist, Sharon Horgan as Boudica, Samantha Spiro as Jackie Kennedy, Julia Davis as Mary Pickford, Zawe Ashton as Eartha Kitt, Kathy Burke as Mona Lisa, Sarah Solemani as Anne Frank, Frances Barber as Catherine the Great, Sheila Reid as Betty Ford, Harry Enfield as "Mrs." Alfred Hitchcock, Samantha Spiro as Queen Victoria and Tom Stuart as Prince Albert

=== Series 2 (2014) ===
No. overall	No. in series	Title	Directed by	Written by	Original release date
6	1	"Playhouse Presents: Psychobitches"	Jeremy Dyson	Jeremy Dyson, Bert Tyler-Moore, George Jeffrie, Ali Crockatt, David Scott, Holly Walsh, Kathy Burke, Seb Cardinal, Dustin Demri-Burns, Dafydd James, Ben Lewis, Dan Swimer	25 November 2014
Cast: Rebecca Front as the Therapist, Michelle Gomez as Mary Queen of Scots, Sharon Horgan as Unity Mitford, Samantha Spiro as Jessica Mitford, Sophie Ellis-Bextor as Nancy Mitford, Morgana Robinson as Anna Nicole Smith, Selina Griffiths as Marie Antoinette, Doon Mackichan as Catherine Howard, Samantha Spiro as Betty Knox, Seb Cardinal as Jack Wilson, Dustin Demri-Burns as Joe Keppel, Seb Cardinal as Janis Joplin, Kathy Burke as the Queen Mother, Reece Shearsmith as Princess Margaret, Frances Barber as Elizabeth I, Sharon Horgan as Tammy Wynette, Katy Brand as Medusa, Michelle Gomez as Margaret Thatcher and Morgana Robinson as Venus
7	2	"Playhouse Presents: Psychobitches"	Jeremy Dyson	Jeremy Dyson, Ali Crockatt, Lucy Montgomery, David Scott, Seb Cardinal, Dustin Demri-Burns, Toby Davies	25 November 2014
Cast: Rebecca Front as the Therapist, Katy Brand as Emily Brontë, Selina Griffiths as Charlotte Brontë, Sarah Solemani as Anne Brontë, Morgana Robinson as Bo Peep, Sharon Horgan as Anna Sewell, Seb Cardinal as Anne Boleyn, Andy Nyman as Henry VIII, Jeremy Dyson as Branwell Brontë, Sharon Horgan as Carmen Miranda, Samantha Spiro as Katharine Hepburn, Liza Tarbuck as Miss Muffet, Jack Whitehall as Prince Charming, Sheridan Smith as Sleeping Beauty, Morgana Robinson as Linda McCartney and Frances Barber as St Catherine
8	3	"Psychobitches"	Jeremy Dyson	Jeremy Dyson, Ali Crockatt, Lucy Montgomery, David Scott, Toby Davies	2 December 2014
Cast: Rebecca Front as the Therapist, Mark Benton as Mrs Noah, Sharon Horgan as Bonnie Parker, Pippa Brown as Coco Chanel, Samantha Spiro as Amelia Earhart, Selina Griffiths as Amy Johnson, Sharon Horgan as Grace Kelly, Michelle Gomez as Ingrid Bergman, Samantha Spiro as Janet Leigh and Lucille Ball, Morgana Robinson as Mary Magdalene, Frances Barber as Whistler's Mother, Tom Stuart as Bob Hope and Martha Howe-Douglas as Pocahontas
9	4	"Playhouse Presents: Psychobitches"	Jeremy Dyson	Jeremy Dyson, Bert Tyler-Moore, George Jeffrie, Ali Crockatt, David Scott, Seb Cardinal, Dustin Demri-Burns, Toby Davies	9 December 2014
Cast: Rebecca Front as the Therapist, Selina Griffiths as Marie Antoinette, Samantha Spiro as Barbara Stanwyck, Katy Brand as Gertrude Jekyll, Dustin Demri-Burns as Lady Godiva, Sharon Horgan as Lucrezia Borgia, Zawe Ashton as Nefertiti, Dustin Demri-Burns as Pandora, Sharon Horgan as PL Travers, Johnny Vegas as Salome, Frances Barber as Thora Hird, Michelle Gomez as Wallis Simpson
10	5	"Psychobitches"	Jeremy Dyson	Jeremy Dyson, Ali Crockatt, David Scott, Dafydd James, Ben Lewis, Jeremy Front, John Kearns	16 December 2014
Cast: Rebecca Front as the Therapist, Sheila Reid as Mother Teresa, Katy Brand as Medusa, Doon Mackichan as Delilah, Miranda Richardson as Enid Blyton, Michelle Gomez as Florence Nightingale, Katy Brand as Georgia O'Keeffe and Isadora Duncan, Frances Barber as Josephine Joseph, Jack Whitehall as Maria von Trapp, Selina Griffiths as Marie Stopes and Dustin Demri-Burns as Nora Ephron
11	6	"Psychobitches"	Jeremy Dyson	Jeremy Dyson	23 December 2014
Cast: Rebecca Front as the Therapist, Kevin Eldon as Witch of Endor, Morgana Robinson as Daphne du Maurier, Frances Barber as Barbara Cartland, Seb Cardinal as Fanny Cradock, Samantha Spiro as Gracie Fields, Meera Syal as Hera, Michelle Gomez as Hildegard von Bingen, Sharon Horgan as Simone de Beauvoir, Sheila Reid as Shirley Temple, Doon Mackichan as the Statue of Liberty, Dustin Demri-Burns as Stygian witch Alarm, Liza Tarbuck as Stygian witch Dread, Seb Cardinal as Stygian witch Horror, Marc Wootton as the goddess Kali, Mathew Baynton as the Witch of Wookey Hole and Richard E. Grant as Witchfinder General Matthew Hopkins
