= Beyond a Joke =

Beyond a Joke may refer to:

- Beyond a Joke (1972 TV series), a British comedy sketch programme
- "Beyond a Joke" (Red Dwarf), a 1997 television episode of Red Dwarf
- Beyond a Joke (2009 TV series), a British documentary series
- Beyond a Joke: Inside the Dark World of Stand-up Comedy, a non-fiction book by Bruce Dessau
