= Ghost Stories (play) =

2010 one-act horror play

- Original West End production logo
- Original language: English
- Written by: Jeremy Dyson; Andy Nyman
- Genre: Horror

Premiere
- Date: 4 February 2010
- Place: Liverpool Playhouse, Liverpool

Ghost Stories is a one-act horror play written by Jeremy Dyson and Andy Nyman.

== Background ==
The play was conceived after Nyman walked past the theatre which had hosted The Woman in Black for over 30 years, and he realised there hadn't been a horror play produced since that time. He contacted his childhood friend Jeremy Dyson with the idea of a new horror play like The Vagina Monologues, with three narrators on stage telling ghost stories. The two were commissioned by Sean Holmes, the newly appointed artistic director of the Lyric Hammersmith theatre in London, to write the play.

== Production history ==
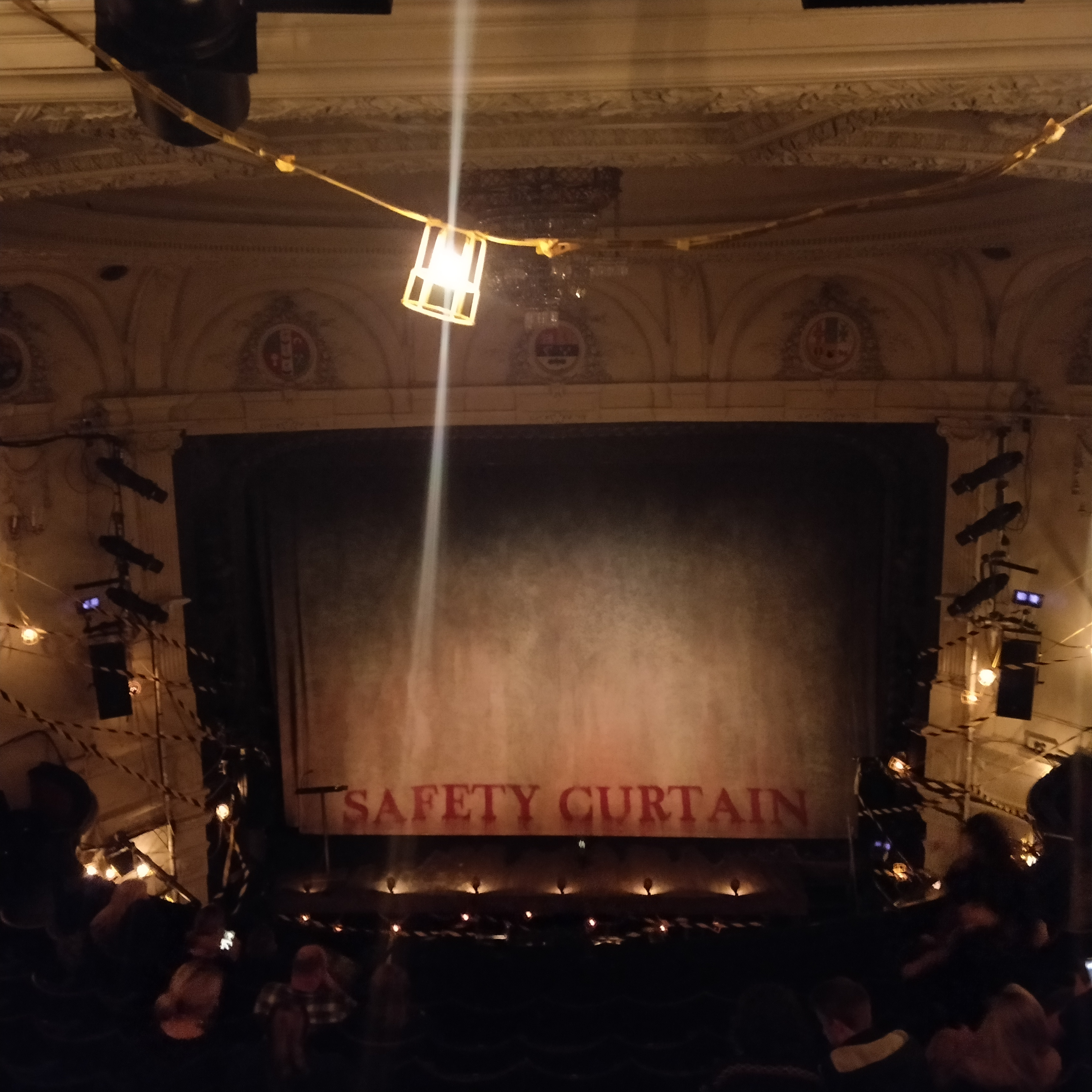
Ghost Stories auditorium, Ambassadors Theatre, 2019

=== UK productions ===
The play made its world premiere at the Liverpool Playhouse on 4 February 2010 in a co-production with the Lyric Hammersmith where it transferred on 1 March 2010. Following the run, it transferred to the Duke of York's Theatre in London's West End where it played from 25 June 2010 until 19 June 2011. The original cast featured the play's co-creator Andy Nyman as Professor Phillip Goodman, David Cardy as Tony Matthews, Ryan Gage as Simon Rifkind and Nicholas Burns as Mike Priddle. From 9 November 2010, Reece Shearsmith took over from Nyman as Goodman.

The production was revived at the Arts Theatre on 13 February 2014 and ran until March 2015.

The play was revived again at the Lyric Hammersmith, marking the end of co-director Holmes' tenure as artistic director at the theatre from 29 March until 11 May 2019. To coincide with this revival, on 4 April 2019, the play text was published by Nick Hern Books. The production transferred to the Ambassadors Theatre in London's West End from 4 October to 4 January 2020.

Following the 2019 revival, the play began its first UK tour from January 2020 at The Alexandra, Birmingham. However on 27 March 2020 it was announced the remainder of the tour had been cancelled due to the COVID-19 pandemic. Another UK tour began in January 2025, opening at the Churchill Theatre, Bromley, touring until September 2025. Following the tour, the production will return to the West End at the Peacock Theatre for a Halloween season from 30 September to 8 November 2025.

=== Other global productions ===
In 2015, the show was produced at the Sydney Opera House before going on an Australian National Tour concluding at the State Theatre Centre of Western Australia in October 2016. The play was also performed in Toronto (2011), Russia (2012), Peru (2015), China (2018), Finland (2018) and The Netherlands (2019).

== Plot ==
The play is notable for running only 80 minutes (with no interval) and for its publicized warnings advising against anyone under the age of 15 attending. The marketing of the show outside the theatre is unusual in that there are no production photographs, just stills and video monitors showing the shocked reactions of audience members. An announcement at the end of the play asks the audience to "keep the secrets of Ghost Stories" so that new audiences do not have the experience spoiled with any prior information about the play.

Its plot and specific moments are sampled from various TV series and films including, most obviously, the episode ‘During Barty’s Party’ from Beasts by Nigel Kneale, Don’t Look Now, Halloween and Le Serpent.

Reviews of the show have confined themselves to outlining the basic structure of the plot, which revolves around Dr. Goodman, a Professor of Parapsychology delivering a lecture on ghost stories. In the lecture, he discusses a website featuring ghostly pictures, scienceofghosts.com. He has recorded interviews with three people who claim to have had a supernatural experience. Each story seems to hinge on guilty feelings. As each interview is played back, the story is re-enacted on stage. The stories are recounted by a night watchman, a teen driver and a businessman awaiting his first child. These stories are then drawn together at the end, with a twist, as it becomes clear that the Professor is a participant in the stories and not simply a narrator.

== Critical reception ==
Reviewing the 2010 production, The Guardian called the stories "as substantial and troubling as the fake ectoplasm manifested by a dodgy medium" while, in the same newspaper, a real-life psychic ghost hunter was quoted as saying the play "was refreshing, and made me jump, several times." After revisiting the play in 2019, the newspaper concluded it had become more elegant over the years, but remained "more playful than petrifying." Time Out called the play a "harrowing, 80-minute nightmare thrill."

== Cast and characters ==
Character	Liverpool / Hammersmith / West End	West End	Hammersmith	West End	UK tour		West End
Character	2010	2014	2019		2020	2025	
Professor Philip Goodman	Andy Nyman	Paul Kemp	Simon Lipkin	Simon Lipkin	Joshua Higgott	Dan Tetsell	Jonathan Guy Lewis
Tony Matthews	David Cardy	Phillip Whitchurch	Garry Cooper	Garry Cooper	Paul Hawkyard	David Cardy	David Cardy
Simon Rifkind	Ryan Gage	Chris Levens	Preston Nyman	Preston Nyman	Gus Gordon	Eddie Loodmer-Elliott	Preston Nyman
Mike Priddle	Nicholas Burns	Gary Shelford	Richard Sutton	Richard Sutton	Richard Sutton	Clive Mantle	Clive Mantle
The Others*	Lewis Peploe	Dino Fetscher	Roly Botha	Lloyd McDonagh	Lloyd McDonagh	Lloyd McDonagh	Lloyd McDonagh

*Previously credited as "Fight and Movement Director" as part of the creative team until the 2025 West End revival

=== Notable replacements ===
==== West End (2010) production ====
- Professor Philip Goodman - Reece Shearsmith

== Creative teams ==
=== Original Liverpool and London production ===
- Written by Jeremy Dyson and Andy Nyman
- Directed by Jeremy Dyson, Andy Nyman and Sean Holmes
- Associate Director Sean Holmes and Joe Murphy
- Designed by Jon Bausor
- Lighting by James Farncombe
- Sound by Nick Manning
- Special Effects by Scott Penrose

== Film adaptation ==
A film adaptation premiered in 2017, starring Nyman in a reprisal of his role as Professor Philip Goodman, Paul Whitehouse as the night watchman, Alex Lawther as the student, and Martin Freeman as the businessman.
