= The Tractate Middoth =

1911 ghost story by M.R. James

- Short story by M.R. James
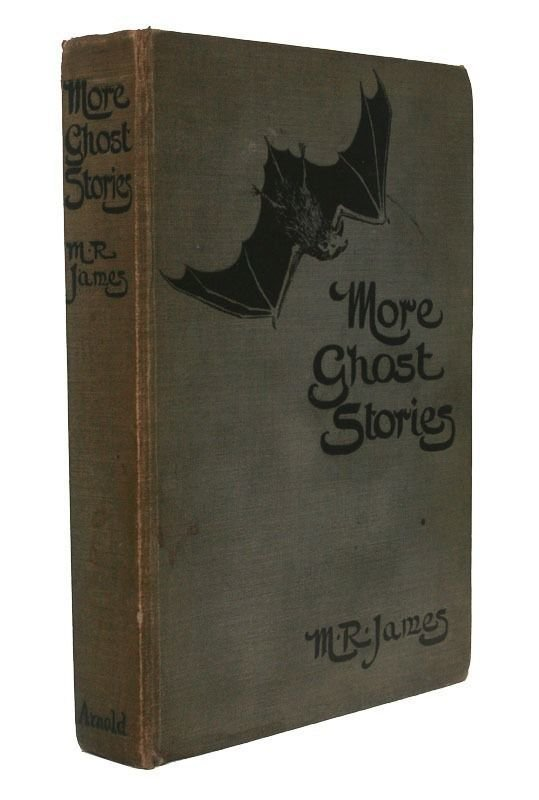

Text available at Wikisource
- Country: England
- Language: English
- Genre: Horror

Publication
- Published in: More Ghost Stories of an Antiquary
- Publisher: Edward Arnold
- Publication date: 1911

"The Tractate Middoth" is a short ghost story by the English author M. R. James. It was published in 1911 in More Ghost Stories of an Antiquary, James's second collection of ghost stories.

== Plot summary ==
Mr. Garrett, an employee of a university library, (Note: Identified by Darryl Jones as the Cambridge University Library.) searches for a Mishnaic book - Talmud: Tractate Middoth, with the commentary of Nachmanides - for an impatient library patron named John Eldred. While searching, he encounters a black-clad clergyman who also seems interested in the book. The clergyman's appearance– his head appears to be enshrouded in cobwebs and he smells of mould and dust– gives Garrett a severe shock and he faints. He is sent home to recover and later decides to recuperate at the seaside.

On the train to his destination, he meets the elderly Mrs. Simpson and her daughter, proprietors of a boarding house who offer him lodgings. Over the course of his stay, they become very friendly. The Simpsons confide in him that they are losing a struggle with a rival heir to the estate of an eccentric clergyman named Rant, who died two decades earlier. As they describe the situation, Garrett realizes that John Eldred is the rival heir. The Tractate Middoth supposedly contains a hidden secret will and testament by Rant that would supersede an earlier version favouring Eldred. Garrett decides to help the Simpsons by preventing Eldred from destroying this document.

Returning to the library, he finds that the Tractate Middoth has been found already and shipped to Eldred at the Rant estate. He follows the book on another train, but arrives too late to stop Eldred from receiving the parcel. As he stalks Eldred back to the Rant mansion, he sees a dark form clutching a mass of cobwebs emerge from the shadows at the side of the road, whereupon Eldred drops dead. An inquest finds black dust on the dead man's face and in his mouth, but the real cause of death is heart failure. The Tractate Middoth becomes evidence. When it appears that Eldred had been tearing out a page when he died, the missing will is discovered and decrypted, written in a coded script that looks like Hebrew. By its terms, Mrs. Simpson inherits the estate formerly possessed by Eldred, and Garrett and her daughter marry.

== Publication ==
"The Tractate Middoth" was first published in More Ghost Stories of an Antiquary in 1911. In 1931, it was collected in The Collected Ghost Stories of M. R. James. It has since been anthologised many times, including in The Supernatural Reader in 1953.

== Adaptations ==
On 7 May 1951, an American television adaptation of "The Tractate Middoth" was broadcast as "The Lost Will of Dr. Rant", as part of the Lights Out mystery series. It starred Leslie Nielsen.

On 28 April 1959, it was adapted as "A Mass of Cobwebs" by Brian Batchelor for the BBC's Thirty-Minute Theatre. It was produced by Robin Midgley and starred Peter Howell as William Garrett, with Edgar Norfolk as Eldred. It was first broadcast on the Light Programme on 28 April 1959 and received its first repeat 59 years later on 27 August 2018 on BBC Radio 4 Extra.

On 26 February 1966, a version of the story adapted by Dennis Webb was broadcast by ATV and Thames Television as part of the Mystery and Imagination series of ghost story adaptations. It starred Giles Block, David Buck, and John Crocker. The episode was wiped after broadcast, and only audio recordings are known to have survived.

On 25 December 2007, the story was read on BBC Radio 4 by Derek Jacobi as part of the M R James at Christmas series.

On 25 December 2013, a version of the story, The Tractate Middoth, adapted by Mark Gatiss, was broadcast on BBC2 as part of the long-running A Ghost Story for Christmas series. It starred Sacha Dhawan, John Castle, Louise Jameson, Una Stubbs, David Ryall, Eleanor Bron, Nick Burns, and Roy Barraclough.
