= Playhouse Presents =

British anthology TV series (2012–2014)

- Season two title card
- Starring: Various
- Country of origin: United Kingdom
- Original language: English
- No. of series: 3
- No. of episodes: 33

Production
- Production location: UK
- Running time: 30 minutes
- Production company: Sky Arts

Original release
- Network: Sky Arts 1
- Release: 12 April 2012 – 19 June 2014

Playhouse Presents is an anthology series of self-contained TV plays, made by British broadcaster Sky Arts. The series started airing on 12 April 2012, on Sky Arts. Each episode is written by a different writer and stars a different cast. The second series began airing in April 2013. A third season began airing 1 May 2014.

Sky Arts announced that they were ordering a five-part spin-off of the third play, Nixon’s The One. They said the full cast, including Harry Shearer as Nixon and Henry Goodman as Kissinger, were slated to return for the series run, which was to be filmed in September 2012. The series was scheduled to broadcast in 2013.

The four-part adaptation of A Young Doctor's Notebook starring Jon Hamm and Daniel Radcliffe was also broadcast as under the Playhouse Presents banner in December 2012. It became the most successful series in the history of Sky Arts and a second series was commissioned, airing in late 2013.

Sky Arts announced two films, Foxtrot and Nightshift, for the Playhouse Presents strand in late 2013. While it initially appeared that these would be broadcast as one-offs, they ended up being aired as part of the third season. A Christmas special titled "Marked", starring Kiefer Sutherland, Stephen Fry, and Kevin McNally, was broadcast in December 2014.

== Episodes ==
Series	Episodes	Originally released	
Series	Episodes	First released	Last released
1	11	12 April 2012	21 June 2012
2	14	18 April 2013	4 July 2013
3	8	1 May 2014	19 June 2014

=== Series 1 (2012) ===
No. overall	No. in series	Title	Directed by	Written by	Original release date
1	1	"Minor Character"	Richard Curson Smith	Will Self	12 April 2012
David Tennant stars as Will, a cynical writer whose reminiscences about a dinner party with his group of friends leads him to make some startling realisations about himself, his friends, his life, and his place in it.
2	2	"Nellie & Melba"	Christine Gernon	Paul O'Grady and Sandi Toksvig	19 April 2012
Set in 1979, it centres around a 51-year-old man named Neville (Paul O'Grady) and his mother Melba (Sheila Hancock) who perform as a double act and dream of stardom.
3	3	"Nixon's The One"	Ed Bye	Judith Owen	26 April 2012
Harry Shearer stars as Richard Nixon, in a play based on the Watergate tapes.
4	4	"King of the Teds"	Jim Cartwright	Jim Cartwright	3 May 2012
Starring Tom Jones as Ron, Alison Steadman as Tina, and Brenda Blethyn as Nina. Aging singer Ron is troubled by the failure of his musical career, and his fading marriage to Tina. When their old friend Nina visits for the first time in 40 years, fond reminiscences soon give way to explosive revelations.
5	5	"City Hall"	Richard Loncraine	Rhashan Stone	10 May 2012
Olivia Williams stars as Dorothy Green, a working-class mum who lands the job of London Mayor after her defiant stand against rioters becomes an internet hit. Co-starring Rhashan Stone, Lucy Punch and Martin Shaw.
6	6	"Care"	Amanda Boyle	Chloe Moss	17 May 2012
Middle class and middle aged, district nurse Natalie (Gina McKee) has become trapped in an existence of meaningless routine until she’s drawn into the lives of two very different women - Elsie (Margaret Jackman), an elderly lady nearing the end of her life and Sammy (Aimee Kelly), the 12-24v in-car power adapter girl next door, who seemingly has everything to live for.
7	7	"The Snipist"	Matthew Holness	Matthew Holness	24 May 2012
In this black drama starring Douglas Henshall, we follow a lone sniper struggling to maintain sanity in a dystopian, rabies-ridden alternate 1970s Britain ruled over by an ominous Ministry of Information. Ordered to watch and protect stranded survivors, the Snipist must fend off attacks from rabid dogs and protect what remains of his own humanity, but is reality exactly as he sees it? In a dark journey through the recesses of the human mind, he rediscovers the grim reality of mankind's own animalistic instincts.
8	8	"Walking the Dogs"	Jeremy Brock	Helen Greaves	31 May 2012
In this comedy drama based on a real life incident, known as the Michael Fagan incident of 1982, we follow the Queen (Emma Thompson), one of her staff (Russell Tovey) and an intruder (Eddie Marsan) over the dramatic half hour which he spends in her bedroom.
9	9	"The Man"	Iain Softley	Sandi Toksvig	7 June 2012
Stephen Fry, Zoë Wanamaker, Stellan Skarsgård and Hayley Atwell star in Sandi Toksvig’s chilling look at how an unelected few decide the fate of the masses.
10	10	"The Other Woman"	Mike Barker	Joshua St Johnson	14 June 2012
Trevor Eve, Geraldine James, Richard E Grant and Tom Ellis get caught in the blurred lines between real life and fiction.
11	11	"Psychobitches"	Jeremy Dyson	Jeremy Dyson	21 June 2012
This comedy puts history’s most famous women into the psychiatrist’s chair. Starring Rebecca Front as the therapist, and featuring Catherine Tate as Eva Braun and Édith Piaf, Sharon Horgan as Jane Austen and Frida Kahlo, Katy Brand as Joan of Arc and George Eliot, Sheila Reid as Mother Teresa, Samantha Spiro as Mary Whitehouse and Judy Garland, Selina Griffiths as Beatrix Potter, Andy Nyman as Sarah, Abraham’s wife and Kathy Burke as The Mona Lisa.

=== Series 2 (2013) ===
No. overall	No. in series	Title	Directed by	Written by	Original release date
12	1	"Hey Diddly Dee"	Marc Warren	Marc Warren	18 April 2013
A dark comedy-drama about the tension during rehearsals for a West End play about Andy Warhol, starring Kylie Minogue, Mathew Horne, Peter Serafinowicz, David Harewood, Paul Kaye and Lee Boardman.
13	2	"Snodgrass"	David Blair	David Quantick	25 April 2013
Based on a novella by Ian R MacLeod, the story follows a fifty-year-old John Lennon, played by Ian Hart, and explores what his life would have been like if he had walked out on The Beatles in 1962.
14	3	"The Call Out"	Carlo Gabriel Nero	Carlo Gabriel Nero	2 May 2013
Based on a short story by Leonard B. Francavilla, it follows Policeman Len (Stephen Graham) as he discovers the loneliness of the city when he meets widow Samantha Bond and elderly woman Vanessa Redgrave during a call to a disturbance on the seventh floor of a block of flats.
15	4	"Pavement Psychologist"	Idris Elba	Idris Elba	9 May 2013
A drama about the relationship between an accountant (Anna Friel), and a charismatic homeless man (Nonso Anozie).
16	5	"Mr Understood"	Kate Hardie	Kate Hardie	16 May 2013
Tom Brooke plays Gary, a young transvestite battling with issues of self-doubt, portrayed through the personification of his inner voice, Frank (Tommy McDonnell). An encounter with fellow transvestite Jim (Neil Dudgeon) helps Gary accept himself, as Jim's inner voice Linda (Claire Skinner) displays his own insecurities.
17	6	"Stage Door Johnnies"	Catherine McCormack	Catherine McCormack and Laura Power	23 May 2013
Filmed in a 'mockumentary' style, the story follows five local enthusiasts as a production of Romeo and Juliet starring Suranne Jones and John Nettles arrives in their town. The fans consist of Marco (Alex MacQueen), an amateur critic, Tony (Steve Evets) a man who makes gifts for the stars, Susan (Anna Calder-Marshall) and Meg (Felicity Montagu), two women who John Nettles has a restraining order against and Ralph (Tom Davis), the quiet observer of the group.
18	7	"Psychobitches Part One"	Jeremy Dyson	Jeremy Dyson, Bert Tyler-Moore, George Jeffrie, Ali Crockatt, David Scott, Lucy Montgomery, Kathy Burke, Derren Litten, Holly Walsh and Freddy Syborn	30 May 2013
The first of a five-part series starring Rebecca Front as a therapist, who talks to various iconic women from history including Julia Davis as Sylvia Plath, Sharon Horgan as Eva Peron, Samantha Spiro as Audrey Hepburn, Mark Gatiss as Joan Crawford, Frances Barber as Bette Davis, Kathy Burke as Mona Lisa, Katy Brand as Mary Shelley and Katy Brand, Selina Griffiths and Sarah Solemani as the Brontë family.
19	8	"Cargese"	Matt Smith	Simon Stephens	30 May 2013
A drama about two teenagers stuck on a council estate. Carl (Craig Roberts) is about to go to college leaving Stephen (Joe Cole) alone to look after his dying mother and mentally challenged brother resulting in Stephen's behaviour to become erratic.
20	9	"Psychobitches Part Two"	Jeremy Dyson	Jeremy Dyson, Bert Tyler-Moore, George Jeffrie, Ali Crockatt, David Scott, Lucy Montgomery and Jessie Cave	6 June 2013
The second of a five-part series starring Rebecca Front as a therapist, who talks to various iconic women from history. In this episode the patients are played by Julia Davis, Sharon Horgan, Samantha Spiro, Frances Barber, Mathew Baynton, Katy Brand, Sharon D. Clarke, Selina Griffiths and Steve Pemberton. The episode includes Diana Dors, Marilyn Monroe, Doris Stokes, The Virgin Mary, Virginia Woolf, Gala Dalí, Cleopatra, Bessie Smith, Dian Fossey, Enid Blyton and Beatrix Potter.
21	10	"Ragged"	Johnny Vegas	Andrew Lynch and Johnny Vegas	6 June 2013
Starring Ricky Tomlinson and Stephen Walters, this story is based on Ricky’s true experiences campaigning for justice in an effort to overturn a verdict which sent him to jail for 2 years in the early 1970s. During his time in prison and on hunger strike, Ricky’s life is changed forever by a prison governor who encourages him to read Robert Tressell’s book The Ragged Trousered Philanthropists.
22	11	"Psychobitches Part Three"	Jeremy Dyson	Jeremy Dyson, Bert Tyler-Moore, George Jeffrie, Ali Crockatt, David Scott, Lucy Montgomery, Julia Davis, Jamie Lennox, Holly Walsh and Louis Waymouth	13 June 2013
The third of a five-part series starring Rebecca Front as a therapist, who talks to various iconic women from history. In this episode the patients are played by Julia Davis, Sharon Horgan, Samantha Spiro, Selina Griffiths, Joanna Scanlan, Reece Shearsmith and Jack Whitehall. The episode includes Elizabeth Taylor, Amalia Freud, Barbara Woodhouse, Old Mother Shipton, Joy Adamson, Diana Spencer, Leni Riefenstahl, Marie Curie and Madame de Pompadour.
23	12	"Gifted"	Marc Evans	Angela Pell	13 June 2013
Rhys Ifans plays Chris, an outsider with a secret ability, who falls in love for the first time with Mona (Sarah Smart). Eventually learning to accept and embrace his unusual 'gift'.
24	13	"Psychobitches Part Four"	Jeremy Dyson	Jeremy Dyson, Ali Crockatt, David Scott, Derren Litten and Freddy Syborn	20 June 2013
The fourth of a five-part series starring Rebecca Front as a therapist, who talks to various iconic women from history. In this episode the patients are played by Julia Davis, Sharon Horgan, Samantha Spiro, Katy Brand, Tamsin Egerton, Michelle Gomez and Ted Robbins. The episode includes Emmeline Pankhurst, Barbara Castle, Helen of Troy, Lot's Wife, Mary Queen of Scots, Nancy Spungen, Eve and Mary Shelley.
25	14	"Psychobitches Part Five"	Jeremy Dyson	Jeremy Dyson, Kathy Burke, Ali Crockatt, David Scott, Derren Litten, Lucy Montgomery, Bert Tyler-Moore and George Jeffrie	27 June 2013
The last of a five-part series starring Rebecca Front as a therapist, who talks to various iconic women from history. In this episode the patients are played by Julia Davis, Sharon Horgan, Samantha Spiro, Zawe Ashton, Frances Barber, Kathy Burke, Harry Enfield, Sheila Reid, Sarah Solemani and Tom Stuart. The episode includes Boudica, Jackie Kennedy, Mary Pickford, Eartha Kitt, Mona Lisa, Anne Frank, Catherine the Great, Betty Ford, Alfred Hitchcock and Queen Victoria.

=== Series 3 (2014) ===
No. overall	No. in series	Title	Directed by	Written by	Original release date
26	1	"The Dog Thrower"	Jon Ronson	Jon Ronson	1 May 2014
Lonely man Jonah (Tim Key) begins throwing his dog in the air and catching him after witnessing a charismatic man (Matthew Perry) doing the same in a local park. His actions make him popular with the locals but after a photographer becomes interested in the performances the publics opinion becomes much more negative.
27	2	"Nosferatu in Love"	Peter Straughan	Peter Straughan	8 May 2014
While on location in the Czech Republic for a remake of the vampire classic, our tormented lead (Mark Strong) flees the set in full Dracula costume. Teaming up with petty crook Fonso, his revenge against his director and his wife will involve his best acting talents - and twelve thousand rats.
28	3	"The Cruise"	Stewart Sugg	Stewart Sugg	15 May 2014
Mobile Hairdresser Jacky is one week from her silver anniversary dream cruise. But is husband Andys hesitation just simple concern - or are darker forces at play? Starring Jane Horrocks & Jason Watkins.
29	4	"Nightshift"	Bruce Goodison	Jimmy Gardner	22 May 2014
Daniel Mays and Ashley Walters star as contrasting police officers getting through a long nightshift in South-East London.
30	5	"Foxtrot"	Polly Stenham	Polly Stenham	29 May 2014
Billie Piper and Alice Sanders star as kidnappers whose boss (Lindsay Duncan) and victim (Ben Whishaw) disrupt their plans.
31	6	"Space Age"	Lawrence Gough	Nick Moran and Ralf Little	5 June 2014
Richard Wilson and Simon Callow star as two ageing men who gain a new lease of life thanks to a voluntary space mission.
32	7	"Damned"	Natalie Bailey	Jo Brand and Morwenna Banks	12 June 2014
Jo Brand and Alan Davies star as stressed social workers struggling to keep control of their private lives and chaotic office.
33	8	"Timeless"	Tony Smith	Tim Firth	19 June 2014
Cara Delevingne and Sylvia Syms star in a touching drama about the burgeoning relationship between a World War II widow and her great-granddaughter.

== Broadcast ==
Playhouse Presents premiered on 4 January 2015 on BBC First.
