= Paul Warren (actor) =

British actor (born 1974)

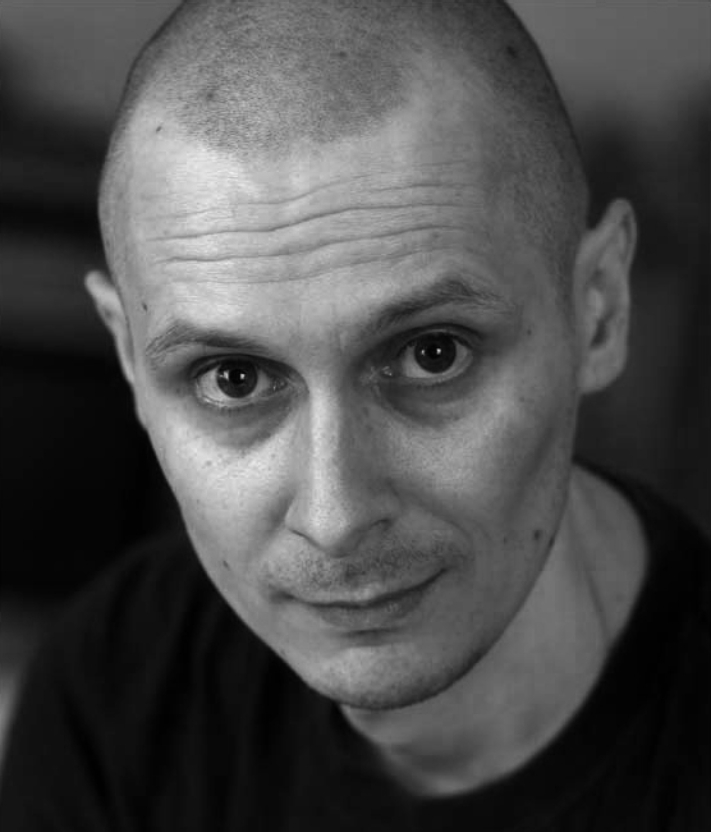
- Paul Warren 2024
- Born: 28 October 1974 (age 51); West London, England
- Occupation: Actor
- Years active: 2005–present
- Website: paulwarren.actor

Paul Warren (born 28 October 1974) is a British actor. He is best known for playing characters wearing heavy prosthetic makeup and/or creature suits, most notably in Star Wars and the Marvel Cinematic Universe, in films and television series such as Captain America: The First Avenger (2011), Thor: The Dark World (2013), Guardians of the Galaxy (2014), Star Wars: The Force Awakens (2015), Star Wars: The Last Jedi (2017), Andor (2022), and The Marvels (2023).

Warren also had creature acting roles in Beetlejuice Beetlejuice (2024), Clash of the Titans (2010), World War Z (2013), Ghost Stories (2017), Willow (2022) and Unwelcome (2023).

== Early life ==
Paul Warren was born in West London.

== Career ==
He began his film career in 2006 as a body double for Daniel Radcliffe on the film Harry Potter and the Order of the Phoenix (2007): "I spent much of my time 20ft up in the air on the hydraulic broomstick system and doing other physically demanding activities during the shoot, whilst building a good rapport with the cast/crew and a reputation as a versatile performer".

Later that same year, he was recommended to Stan Winston Studio as a good choice to portray an emaciated version of the title character (played by Mike Vogel) in The Deaths of Ian Stone. Crediting Winston and his team, he said, "This door opening into the world of acting under silicone and foam latex, is what ultimately led to a film career playing characters in heavy prosthetics and creature suits".

His first creature performing role was in 2009, where he played a tortured soul who pulls the boat across the River Styx in the remake of Clash of the Titans.

In 2010, Warren was used as a visual effect double for skinny Steve Rogers in Captain America: The First Avenger. He was the original template for Skinny Steve in the pre-production VFX head replacement tests and was on set for the recruitment scene as a visual reference. Body double duties for the rest of production (which total about 5% according to director Joe Johnston) were performed by stage actor Leander Deeny.

On getting the role of Varmik, one of the Hassk triplet's in Star Wars: The Force Awakens, he says, "It felt very surreal. I wasn't told what it was that I was being asked to go in for; only that the production was putting together a team of core creature performers for a film at Pinewood Studios. I had been recommended to them by creature designer and makeup artist Martin Rezard, who I had worked with previously on Guardians of the Galaxy and Thor: The Dark World."

Varmik is of particular interest to Star Wars fans due to his origin: "The character is based on 2 classic pieces of Ralph McQuarrie's Star Wars production art from 1975. The cantina showdown and early Chewbacca designs. The former is a particular favorite of J. J. Abrams' that he wanted to bring to life on screen."

In Star Wars: The Last Jedi, Warren plays a dowager alien called Gatha Elbaphay in the Canto Bight casino. The character created quite a buzz online when it was revealed by director Rian Johnson that the animatronic space pug Awgree she holds was based on Carrie Fisher's very own pet pooch Gary, affectionately known on set as Space Gary.

Warren is credited as Quadpaw performer in the Star Wars television series Andor. He was also a Troll in episode 6, season 1 of the TV series Willow. Both were produced by Lucasfilm.

During the 2020 COVID-19 pandemic, Warren joined the cast and crew of the killer goblin film Unwelcome. As well as playing the Redcap goblin Mr. Sniff, he also took on a new role of Creature Movement Coach for Nick Chopping's stunt team.

2023 saw Paul working once again with Neal Scanlan's creature workshop on the much anticipated sequel to Beetlejuice titled Beetlejuice Beetlejuice. He played the role of Shrinker Tom and was a puppeteer in the waiting room performing the hand for the man in a box.

Occasionally he still steps out from behind the prosthetics, for example when he provided mime/movement for Steven Spielberg's Ready Player One in 2018 and when he was a special action performer on Kingsman: The Secret Service (2014) for that stunt scene in the church choreographed by the late Brad Allan.

== Filmography ==
=== Film ===
Year	Title	Role	Notes
2006	Children of Men	Injured Refugee	
2007	The Deaths of Ian Stone	Emaciated Ian	
2007	Harry Potter and the Order of the Phoenix	Harry Potter	Body double
2010	Hereafter	Dying Hospital Patient	
2010	Clash of the Titans	Charon's Tortured Soul	
2010	Harry Potter and the Deathly Hallows – Part 1	Ministry Wizard	
2011	X-Men: First Class	Young Magneto	Body double
2011	Captain America: The First Avenger	Skinny Steve Rogers	Pre-production visual effects body double
2012	Wrath of the Titans	Hermes	Deleted scene
2013	Jack the Giant Slayer	The Not-So-Strong Man	
2013	The Tractate Middoth	Rant's Ghost	BBC film shown on Christmas Day 2013
2013	Thor: The Dark World	Marauder Creature	
2013	The Last Days on Mars	Infected Marko	
2013	World War Z	Russian Zombie	Also visual effects movement reference
2014	Kingsman: The Secret Service	Church congregation	Stunts
2014	Guardians of the Galaxy	Toothless	
2015	Star Wars: The Force Awakens	Varmik	Credited as creature and droid puppeteer
2017	Ghost Stories	Woolly	
2017	Star Wars: The Last Jedi	Gatha Elbaphay	Credited as creature and droid puppeteer
2018	Ready Player One	IOI (special movement)	
2018	Ghost Stories	Woolly	
2021	Lair	Abyzou	
2023	The Marvels	Skrull	Also played the character 'Toothless' (deleted scene)
2023	Unwelcome	Redcap Mr Sniff	Also creature movement coach
2024	Beetlejuice Beetlejuice	Tom - Shrinker	Also was a waiting room puppeteer for the man in a box

=== Television ===
Year	Title	Role	Notes
2008	That Mitchell and Webb Look	Cricketer	Episode #2.3
2008–2009	Sorry, I've Got No Head	Witchfinder	7 episodes
2010	The Legend of Dick and Dom	Goblin	Episode: "Beastly"
2010	Pete versus Life	Paul the Tramp	Episode: "Fankoo"
2010	The Bill	Drug Addict	Episode: "Tombstone"
2011	How TV Ruined Your Life	Paul the Tramp	Episode: "Aspiration"
2011	Holby City	Drug Addict	Episode: "Rescue Me"
2010–2011	EastEnders	Dan Pearce	
2012	Peep Show	Supply Teacher	Episode: "Business Secrets of the Pharaohs"
2014	Rev.	Steve's Mate	Episode #3.4
2016	Houdini and Doyle	First Alien	Episode: "The Monsters of Nethermoor"
2022	Willow	Troll	Episode: "Prisoners of Skellin"
2022	Andor	Quadpaw Performer	Season 1 Episode 6
