= Ghost Stories (2017 film) =

- Theatrical release poster
- Directed by: Jeremy Dyson; Andy Nyman
- Written by: Jeremy Dyson; Andy Nyman
- Based on: Ghost Stories by: Jeremy Dyson; and Andy Nyman
- Produced by: Claire Jones; Robin Gutch
- Starring: Andy Nyman; Paul Whitehouse; Alex Lawther; Martin Freeman
- Cinematography: Ole Bratt Birkeland
- Edited by: Billy Sneddon
- Music by: Frank Ilfman
- Production companies: Altitude Film Entertainment; Warp Films; Catalyst Global Media; Screen Yorkshire
- Distributed by: Lionsgate
- Release dates: 5 October 2017 (London Film Festival); 6 April 2018 (United Kingdom)
- Running time: 98 minutes
- Country: United Kingdom
- Language: English
- Box office: $4.2 million

Ghost Stories is a 2017 British anthology horror film written and directed by Jeremy Dyson and Andy Nyman, based on their 2010 stage play of the same name. It stars Nyman reprising his role from the play, as a man devoted to debunking fraudulent psychics, who is tasked with solving three unexplained paranormal events. Paul Whitehouse, Alex Lawther and Martin Freeman co-star as the individuals who attest to the supernatural encounters.

The film premiered at the London Film Festival on 5 October 2017 and was released nationwide in the United Kingdom on 6 April 2018 by Lionsgate. It received positive reviews from film critics.

== Plot ==
In 1979, Philip Goodman's strict Jewish father threw his sister out of the family for dating an Asian man. As an adult, Goodman is lonely and single; he is also a well-known professor and television presenter whose show is devoted to debunking fraudulent psychics, which he regards as his life's work to stop people's lives being ruined by superstition the way his family's was. He receives an invitation to visit a famed 1970s paranormal investigator, Charles Cameron, who inspired him as a boy, but who has been missing for decades and is now living in a caravan, sick and impoverished. Cameron asks him to investigate three incidents of supposedly real supernatural ghost sightings.

The first case is a night watchman, Tony Matthews, whose wife has died of cancer and who feels guilty that he stopped visiting his daughter, who suffers from locked-in syndrome. He was haunted by the spirit of a young girl while working in a disused asylum for women. The second is a teenager, Simon Rifkind, who is obsessed with the occult and has a poor relationship with his parents. His car breaks down after running over a creature in the woods. Goodman, although unsettled by the second case, believes that each of them has an obvious rational explanation: the supposed victims imagined them, based on their neuroses. The third case is a financier in the City, Mike Priddle, who was plagued by a poltergeist, while awaiting the birth of his child. His wife's ghost appeared to him as she died giving birth to an (it is implied) inhuman child. Suddenly, the financier commits suicide with a shotgun.

Goodman returns to Cameron, who tears a latex mask off his face, revealing himself to be Priddle. Goodman at first believes that he is the victim of an elaborate hoax, but reality soon breaks down altogether. Priddle leads Goodman back in time to the scene of a childhood incident in which he watched two bullies entice a mentally disabled boy into a drain, where he died of an asthma attack. Goodman has felt guilty all his life about his failure to rescue the victim. The decaying corpse of the bullied boy appears, tormenting Goodman and leading him to a hospital bed, where he is made to lie down. The ghoul lies on top of him and forces his finger into Goodman's mouth as Goodman cries "No, not again!" implying this is a recurring event.

In the real world, Goodman is in a hospital with tubes in his mouth. He suffers from locked-in syndrome after a suicide attempt in his car. All the characters and events Goodman has experienced were inspired by the staff and objects in his hospital room. The doctors incorrectly believe him to be in a persistent vegetative state with no awareness of his surroundings. The junior doctor predicts that Goodman is "here for keeps", without a chance of recovery. As he leaves the room, the senior doctor says to his junior colleague: "I hope his dreams are sweet". The hospital cleaner, in contrast, chats to Goodman and moves a mirror to give him a different view.

== Cast ==
Main

- Andy Nyman as Philip Goodman, a famous professor and television presenter, whose show is devoted to debunking fraudulent psychics and explaining paranormal events.
  - Samuel Bottomley as Young Goodman, portraying Philip Goodman as a teenager.
- Martin Freeman as Mike Priddle/Charles Cameron
- Paul Whitehouse as Tony Matthews
- Alex Lawther as Simon Rifkind

Supporting

- Deborah Wastell as Mrs Goodman
- Amy Doyle as Esther Goodman
- Daniel Hill as Mr Goodman
- Ramzan Miah as Esther's Boyfriend
- Nicholas Burns as Mark Van Rhys
- Louise Atkins as Steph
- Neil Finnighan as Security Guard
- Christine Dalby as Beth Hooper
- Maggie McCarthy as Jean Hooper
- Lesley Harcourt as BBC Local Newsreader
- Jake Davies as Desi Callahan/Kojak
- Oliver Woollford as Nico Freer
- Callum Goulden as Marcus Perry
- Macie Allen as Tilly
- Kobna Holdbrook-Smith as Father Richard Emery
- Joe Osborne as Mr Rifkind
- Maria Major as Mrs Rifkind
- Paul Warren as Woolly
- Ryan Oliva as Hellion
- Emily Carding as Maria Priddle

Voices

- Jill Halfpenny as Peggy Van Rhys
- Anthony Davis as the Radio DJ
- Mike Aarons as Mike from Barnet
- Derren Brown as Betty
- Elaine Dyson as Mrs Rifkind
- Billy Sneddon as the National Breakdown Assistant Caller

Jeremy Dyson has an uncredited appearance as the DJ at Philip's Bar Mitzvah.

Martin Freeman, Andy Nyman and one or two others on set, apparently made up the name Leonard Byrne to fool the rest of the cast, crew and media, into thinking that the character of Charles Cameron, which was actually just Martin Freeman in a prosthetic mask, was a real person.

== Production ==
Ghost Stories filmed at locations including Leeds (Leeds City Varieties music hall, Harehills Labour Club, Chapel Allerton and Holbeck), Saltaire, Harewood Estate, Harrogate and Hornsea in 2016.

The exterior of pub ("The 10th Number") where Philip Goodman meets Tony Matthews was The Merry Monk at 109 Kirkstall Hill, Leeds. It was demolished in 2017. The church where Goodman meets Father Richard Emery is Holy Trinity Church, Cookridge.

== Reception ==
On review aggregator website Rotten Tomatoes, the film holds an approval rating of 85% based on 131 reviews, and an average rating of 7.11/10. The website's critical consensus reads, "Ghost Stories offers a well-crafted, skillfully told horror anthology that cleverly toys with genre tropes while adding a few devilishly frightful twists." On Metacritic, the film has a weighted average score of 68 out of 100, based on 27 critics, indicating "generally favourable reviews".

Ghost Stories was described by Peter Bradshaw of The Guardian as "an anthology of creepy supernatural tales in the intensely English tradition of Amicus portmanteau movies from the 1960s." He gave it 4/5 stars. David Stratton of The Australian also gave it 4/5 stars, writing: "This is a low-tech affair, and all the more interesting for it. You never know quite where it's going, but it doesn't let up for a moment." Andrew Whalen of Newsweek wrote: "Ghost Stories has more genuine scares than most horror movies, so it almost seems a bit unfair when it's funny too."

Jeannette Catsoulis of The New York Times was more critical of the film, writing: "Managing to feel at once painfully slow and bafflingly truncated, this creaky triptych of not-so-scary tales is a tame curiosity of movie nostalgia." Jake Wilson of The Age gave it 2/5 stars, writing: "It's a letdown to find that there's nothing at the bottom of a box of tricks which in themselves are not as clever as they could have been."
