= Messiah (Derren Brown special) =

- Created by: Derren Brown, Andy Nyman
- Directed by: Ben Caron
- Presented by: Derren Brown
- Country of origin: United Kingdom
- No. of episodes: 1

Production
- Executive producers: Derren Brown, Andrew O'Connor, Anthony Owen
- Producer: Debbie Young
- Cinematography: Chris Yacoubian
- Editors: Tristram Giff (film); Alex Pickering (online)
- Running time: 60mins

Original release
- Network: Channel 4
- Release: 7 January 2005

Messiah is a Derren Brown special originally shown on Channel 4 on 7 January 2005 at 21:00. In the episode, Brown travels to the United States to try to convince five influential figures that he has special abilities in their particular field of expertise: psychic powers, Christian evangelism, New Age theories, alien abduction and contacting the dead, with the objective of getting them to endorse him as a practitioner in their field.

The concept of the show is to highlight the power of suggestion with regard to beliefs and people's abilities, and failure to question them. Brown makes it quite clear that if any of the subjects accused him of trickery he would immediately come clean about the whole thing, a rule similar to one of the self-imposed rules of the perpetrators of the Project Alpha hoax. Using a false name each time, he succeeds in convincing four "experts" that he has powers, who openly endorsed him as a true practitioner. The fifth expert, the Christian evangelist Curt Nordheilm, is reserved in his response; whilst impressed by Brown's performance, he does not agree to a public endorsement without at least meeting him again. Brown concludes with his impressions of the experience and summary of how belief systems work.

== Psychic Powers ==
Derren Brown asked a leading figure at a psychic training school in Sedona, Arizona to go into another room and draw a number of simple pictures on any topic she wished. After each picture had been completed, Brown would have his prediction of what the picture was of written down by the other members of the training school in the room with him. He was mostly correct, the one slight error being a cross instead of a Star of David (though he did state it was some kind of religious imagery - maybe a cross?). On one occasion when Brown was telling the participant to draw the next picture, he instructed the lady to "let some ideas sail into your mind" and not to go "overboard on detail". She drew a boat on water.

== UFO Abductee ==
Derren Brown contacted a leading proponent of UFO abductions, claiming, under his pseudonym, to have been abducted. He further claimed that, since his abduction, he was able to sense a person's medical history and current medical state by touch alone. He invited the lady, and her husband, to decide between them which one he should 'read'. Turning his back and closing his eyes, he waited while one of them made physical contact with him. At this point he stated that the person touching him had or was having trouble sleeping, and had some problem with their heart or throat. Turning around, he further informed the lady that she had had something serious with her throat but that it had been 'decades' ago. He asked if he was close, to which she replied he was exactly correct. She further characterised his reading as 100% accurate. She very sincerely endorsed him to camera, and invited him to speak at a meeting of her group. He declined the invitation.

== New-Age Theories ==
Derren Brown instructed a leading new-age theorist to sleep with a machine attached to her pillow for five days. She was told that this machine used crystal technology to record her dreams. In fact it was simply a box with a switch which turned a LED on and off. Brown recalled the dreams correctly, including the fact that some were in black-and-white instead of colour. (Twelve per cent of people dream only in black and white). The participant was so impressed that she invited Brown to appear on her radio show the next day, which he declined.

== Evangelism ==
Brown performed seemingly 'instant conversions' on a group consisting of members of the public, almost all of whom were atheists and non-believers. After the first 'instant conversion' many of the group reportedly chose to leave, concerned by what they had just witnessed. Brown then attempted to 'convert' another individual and then the remainder of the group at once. After this, participants were questioned and most declared a belief in, or openness to the idea of, God or "something". At the end of the segment, a notice on screen announced that the participants had all been "de-converted" before they left. In conclusion, the pastor neither endorsed Brown's abilities as genuine nor denied them, but noted this was an unfamiliar form of conversion experience to him. Instead, he asked for another meeting with Brown before any public endorsement could be considered, which Brown turned down.

== Contacting the Dead ==
Brown explained that many mediums use a technique called cold reading. To illustrate this he arranged a clairvoyant demonstration with "fairly sceptical New Yorkers". During the séance Brown convinced three women into believing that he was in contact with deceased loved ones and during the performance many tears were shed. Afterwards it was explained to the participants that it was a trick, and those appearing agreed to broadcasting the event.

== Conclusion ==
Derren Brown ends the episode with a monologue, describing his impressions of the experience. His conclusion is that belief systems work in similar ways: that people tend to hear only things that support their own ideas and ignore contradictory evidence; this principle is known in psychology as confirmation bias. More subtly Brown leaves viewers questioning whether, by not achieving his stated objective, he is cleverly demonstrating this principle himself: Brown admits his own scepticism is also subject to this principle and claims success because none of his subjects asked him if the experience was real, however he makes no further reference to his goal of convincing all his subjects to agree to a public endorsement.
