= The Tractate Middoth (film) =

2013 British television ghost story

- Title screen
- Based on: "The Tractate Middoth" by M. R. James
- Written by: Mark Gatiss
- Directed by: Mark Gatiss
- Starring: Sacha Dhawan as William Garrett; John Castle as John Eldred; Louise Jameson as Mary Simpson; Charlie Clemmow as Anne Simpson; Una Stubbs as Miss Chambers; David Ryall as Dr Rant; Paul Warren as Rant's Ghost; Eleanor Bron as Mrs Goundry; Nick Burns as George Earle; Roy Barraclough as Hodgson

Production
- Producer: Susie Liggat
- Running time: 36 minutes

Original release
- Network: BBC Two
- Release: 25 December 2013

Related
- A Ghost Story for Christmas

The Tractate Middoth is a short film which is part of the British supernatural anthology series A Ghost Story for Christmas. Produced by Susie Liggat, it is the first installment to be written and directed by Mark Gatiss, who has helmed every subsequent episode as of 2025. It is based on the ghost story of the same name by M. R. James, first published in the collection More Ghost Stories of an Antiquary (1911), and first aired on BBC Two on 25 December 2013.

It stars Sacha Dhawan as William Garrett, a student working part-time at a university library, who is pulled into a conflict between cousins Mary Simpson (Louise Jameson) and John Eldred (John Castle) involving their uncle's inheritance. John's search for an elusive Mishnaic tractate in the library proves to be a vital clue, though William quickly discovers there's more to it than meets the eye.

Gatiss had been heavily influenced by the original 1971–1978 run of A Ghost Story for Christmas, the majority of episodes having been based on stories by James. Having hosted the BBC documentary series A History of Horror (2010), Gatiss had been approached to host a documentary about James, but turned it down until it was agreed he could make a new episode of A Ghost Story for Christmas to accompany it. The series had returned in 2005, though only sporadically, with this being the first instalment since "Whistle and I'll Come to You" (2010). Gatiss chose "The Tractate Middoth" due to it being one of his favourite James stories.

== Synopsis ==
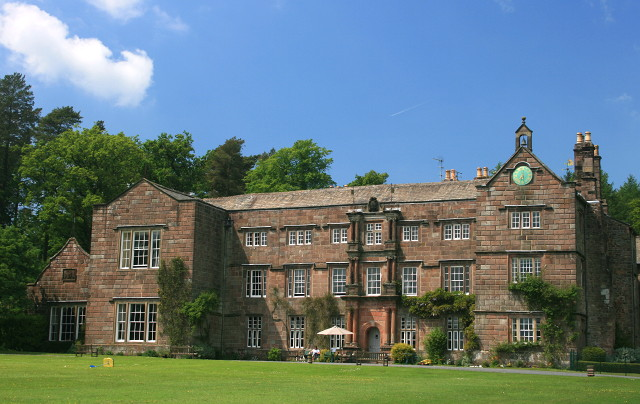
Browsholme Hall stood in for Bretfield Manor in the drama

Mary Simpson (Louise Jameson) is called to the deathbed of her clergyman uncle, Dr Rant (David Ryall), at his imposing home, Bretfield Manor. She arrives just as her cousin, John Eldred (John Castle), is leaving. Rant tells Mary there is something she must know.

Twenty years later William Garrett (Sacha Dhawan), a student working part-time at a university library, is sent by the library attendant 'Sniffer' Hodgson (Roy Barraclough) to search for a Mishnaic tractate for an impatient library patron named John Eldred. Eldred is strangely reluctant to fetch the book himself, and seems to recognise and is afraid of the swirling dust at the far end of the library. While searching for the book Garrett encounters a black-clad clergyman who also seems interested in the book. As the clergyman turns Garrett sees him - his head is enshrouded in cobwebs and he smells of mould and dust – which vision causes Garrett a severe shock and he faints. He is sent home to recover and is persuaded by his friend George Earle (Nick Burns) to recuperate at the seaside.

On the train to his destination Garrett meets the comical Miss Chambers (Una Stubbs). He is met at the station by the impoverished widow Mary Simpson and her daughter Anne (Charlie Clemmow), who are forced to take in "ruddy lodgers" to make ends meet. The Simpsons confide in him that they are losing a struggle with a rival heir to the estate of her deceased uncle, an unpleasant clergyman named Dr Thomas Rant. She explains, "I had an old uncle, a Dr Rant. He wasn't a distinguished man. And not a nice one, either. He was a priest. Though I'm sure I don't know how he got to be one. He never did any duties, as far as I could tell, in the late part of his life. And he wasn't what you'd call 'Christian' in his ways. He hadn't any wife, or family, only one niece, that's me, and one nephew, my cousin John. But he didn't really like either of us." On his deathbed Rant had told Mary Simpson that he had left his considerable estate to his nephew John Eldred - but tells her there is a later will leaving everything to her - if she has the wits to find it. He gives her the clue that the will is in English, though she won't recognise it as such, and is hidden in a printed book elsewhere. He passes her a further clue - a slip of paper on which is written '11334'. At the funeral Rant's former housekeeper Mrs Goundry (Eleanor Bron) warns Mary Simpson, "Twisted, 'e was. Twisted. Where others 'ave a soul, 'e 'ad a corkscrew. Don't trust 'im ... in life or death." As they describe the situation, Garrett realizes that the man at the library is John Eldred - the rival heir. The tractate supposedly contains the hidden secret will that would supersede the earlier last will and testament. Garrett decides to help the Simpsons by preventing Eldred from destroying this document.

Returning to the library, Garrett realised that '11334' is the catalogue number for the copy of the Tractate Middoth that Eldred had been so interested in. He finds that the tractate has been sent by train to Eldred at Bretfield Manor. Following the book in the next train, he arrives too late to stop Eldred from collecting the parcel. Garrett stalks Eldred through the countryside, and as Eldred sits on a stile to open the book to tear out and destroy the will a strange black spot appears on the page before him and spreads. The black hand of the awful dark figure of Rant reaches out for the face of Eldred, as spiders run about the heavy cobwebs on Rant's dead and twisted face. Eldred drops dead. An inquest finds the cause of his death is heart failure. The tractate becomes evidence. When it appears that Eldred had been tearing out a page when he died, the missing will is discovered and decrypted, written in a script that looks like Hebrew but when read in a mirror proves to be English. By its terms, Mrs. Simpson inherits the estate formerly possessed by Eldred. She visits the property, followed by Garrett and Anne hand in hand - but as they enter, an ominous dusty shadow is in the doorway behind them, and a spider follows them in.

== Cast ==
- Sacha Dhawan as William Garrett
- John Castle as John Eldred
- Louise Jameson as Mary Simpson
- Charlie Clemmow as Anne Simpson
- Una Stubbs as Miss Chambers
- David Ryall as Dr Rant
- Paul Warren as Rant's ghost
- Eleanor Bron as Mrs Goundry
- Nick Burns as George Earle
- Roy Barraclough as Hodgson
- Mathew McQuinn as Labourer (as Mathew Foster)
- Messalina Morley as Female student

== Production ==
=== Writing ===
Gatiss says the story is one of his favourite M. R. James tales and decided to set his version in the 1950s. He created the character of Garrett's eccentric fellow traveller Miss Chambers (Una Stubbs), whom he encounters on the train to the seaside town where he hopes to recuperate from his shock in the library. In a 2013 interview recorded for the British Film Institute Gatiss said that, despite his desire to be faithful to and "honour" the original, there was no reason for Dr Rant to come back as a ghost and behave the way it did in the story, so he created the character of the housekeeper Mrs Goundry (Eleanor Bron) to emphasise the "twisted" character of Rant. He changed the happy ending of the original to something more ominous.

On being refused permission to use dust during the appearances of the spectre of Dr Rant in Chetham's Library the production instead used bulrushes to create the swirling effect.

=== Locations ===
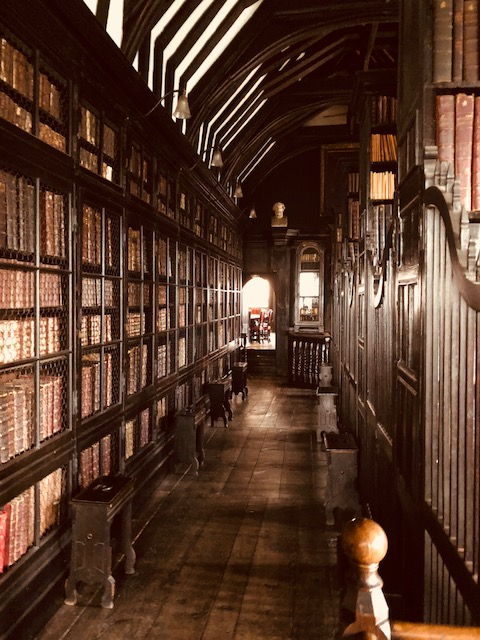
Interior of Chetham's Library used in the drama

Locations in the drama included Chetham's Library in Manchester, and Browsholme Hall, Cow Ark in Lancashire, which stood in as Bretfield Manor. Scenes were also filmed at Stonyhurst College, where students in 1950s costumes appeared as background artists. This featured as the university buildings housing the library.

== Home video ==
"The Tractate Middoth" was first released on DVD in 2022 by 2 Entertain along with "The Dead Room" (2018), "Martin's Close" (2019), and "The Mezzotint" (2021) on a single DVD titled Ghost Stories.
