= Elizabeth Arnold (children's writer) =

English children's writer

Susan Elizabeth Arnold
- Born: 15 December 1944 (age 81); Leicester, United Kingdom
- Education: Open University
- Occupation: Children’s author
- Writing career
- Language: English
- Years active: 1995–present
- Genre: Children’s literature

Susan Elizabeth Arnold (born 15 December 1944) is an English writer of children's fiction. Her best-known works form a trilogy set among Gypsies in the New Forest of Southern England.

== Family ==
She was born in Leicester. Her family moved several times during her childhood. She was the eldest of five sisters, including triplets. Having left school at 15, she later took a City and Guilds course for science technicians, and eventually gained an Open University degree in science and technology. In 2011 she was living with her husband in Southampton. Her own favourite children's book is Lewis Carroll's Alice in Wonderland, which was " the first book I became truly aware of, from the age of about two. My father used to read it to me at bedtime."

== Folklore ==
Having worked for many years as a school science technician and a quality control manager, Elizabeth Arnold came to write The Parsley Parcel, her first novel, out of a love of folklore, and originally with adults in mind rather than children. Set among Gypsies in the New Forest, it was shortlisted for the Beefeater (Whitbread) Children's Book Award in 1995, appeared in paperback in 1996, and was reissued in 1998. An audio version read by Nerys Hughes also appeared in 1998. The book formed the basis for a seven-part Gypsy Girl ITV series in 2001. The main character is Freya, a Romany girl with benign magic powers, played on TV by Gemma Gregory, with Eleanor Bron as her great-grandmother. The Freya or Gypsy Girl Trilogy was completed with Gold and Silver Water, and A Riot of Red Ribbon.

Arnold has written about how she came to name her character: "Freya was a Romany child, and in ancient Romany culture a child had three names. A formal name; a pet or nickname, and a secret name. The secret name is whispered by a mother to her child only twice; at the moment of birth and once more when the child is old enough to remember.... I chose Freya as my heroine's formal name. Freya, named after the goddess Freya born on Friday. This was important because in The Parsley Parcel, special magic would be worked on Good Friday. Her pet name was Chime. Why? Because she was a Chime-Child, a gypsy girl born with special powers to work special enchantments. Her secret name? It's a secret, of course, that she and I will share forever."

== Other work ==
Other chapter books by Elizabeth Arnold have included The Gold-Spectre, and Spin of the Sunwheel, which was nominated for the Carnegie Medal in 1999 – a young-adult fantasy novel from Mammoth Books of London (her regular publisher). Scraggy Flies High, Thief in the Garden, and The Triple Trouble Gang are storybooks for younger children. She contributed to a book of children's stories sold in aid of tsunami victims, edited a book of children's stories written by children, and provided a story for the anthology Hipp-O-Dee-Doo-Day, sold in aid of Children's Hospices UK.
