= Gypsy Girl (TV series) =

- Genre: Drama
- Written by: Elizabeth Arnold; Carol Noble
- Starring: Gemma Gregory; Fionnuala Ellwood
- Country of origin: United Kingdom
- Original language: English
- No. of seasons: 1
- No. of episodes: 7

Original release
- Network: ITV (CITV)
- Release: 19 February – 2 April 2001

Gypsy Girl is a 2001 British television series that ran on CITV.

== Overview ==
Gypsy Girl began airing in February 2001. Made up of seven episodes, the show is based on Elizabeth Arnold's three-book series consisting of The Parsley Parcel, Gold and Silver Water, and A Riot of Red Ribbon. It centred on a Romani girl, Freya Boswell (played by Gemma Gregory), and her family, who lived in a typical caravan on the corner of a typical suburban street. Her great-grandmother was played by Eleanor Bron.

Freya was often called "Gyppo", a derogatory term, by a boy who disliked her. To make the show an accurate representation of Romany life, the show relied on an advisor with Romany expertise to construct the Romany caravans, camp, attire. For her role, Gregory received horse-riding lessons. She debuted as a professional singer, performing the show's title track. Gregory said in an interview, "It was really nerve wracking. I've been acting for ages, so that doesn't worry me, but the singing was something new. I had no experience but it was fantastic to do. The song is wicked as well."

== Cast ==
- Gemma Gregory as Freya Boswell
- Eleanor Bron as Romany Gran, Freya's great-grandmother
- Thomas Jamerson as Tashar, Freya's brother. He is "cool" and "enigmatic".
- Gary Webster as Kokko George, Freya's uncle. He is a violin player and "a fun-loving scallywag".
- Olivia Winstone as Mary, Freya's friend
- Lloyd Owen as Jack, Emma's husband. Their baby has gone missing.
- Fionnuala Ellwood as Emma, Jack's wife. Their baby has gone missing.
- Leslie Grantham as "a sinister second-hand car salesman"

== Reception ==
In The Hill and Beyond, the authors Alistair D. McGown and Mark J. Doherty praised the series for being an "excellent" show that "harked back to seemingly lost values". They wrote, "Though it was roundly marketed as a British Sabrina, and probably only commissioned in the hope that it would be, the reality was that the stories it told were rather more thoughtful."
