= Eleanor Bron =

English actress (born 1938)

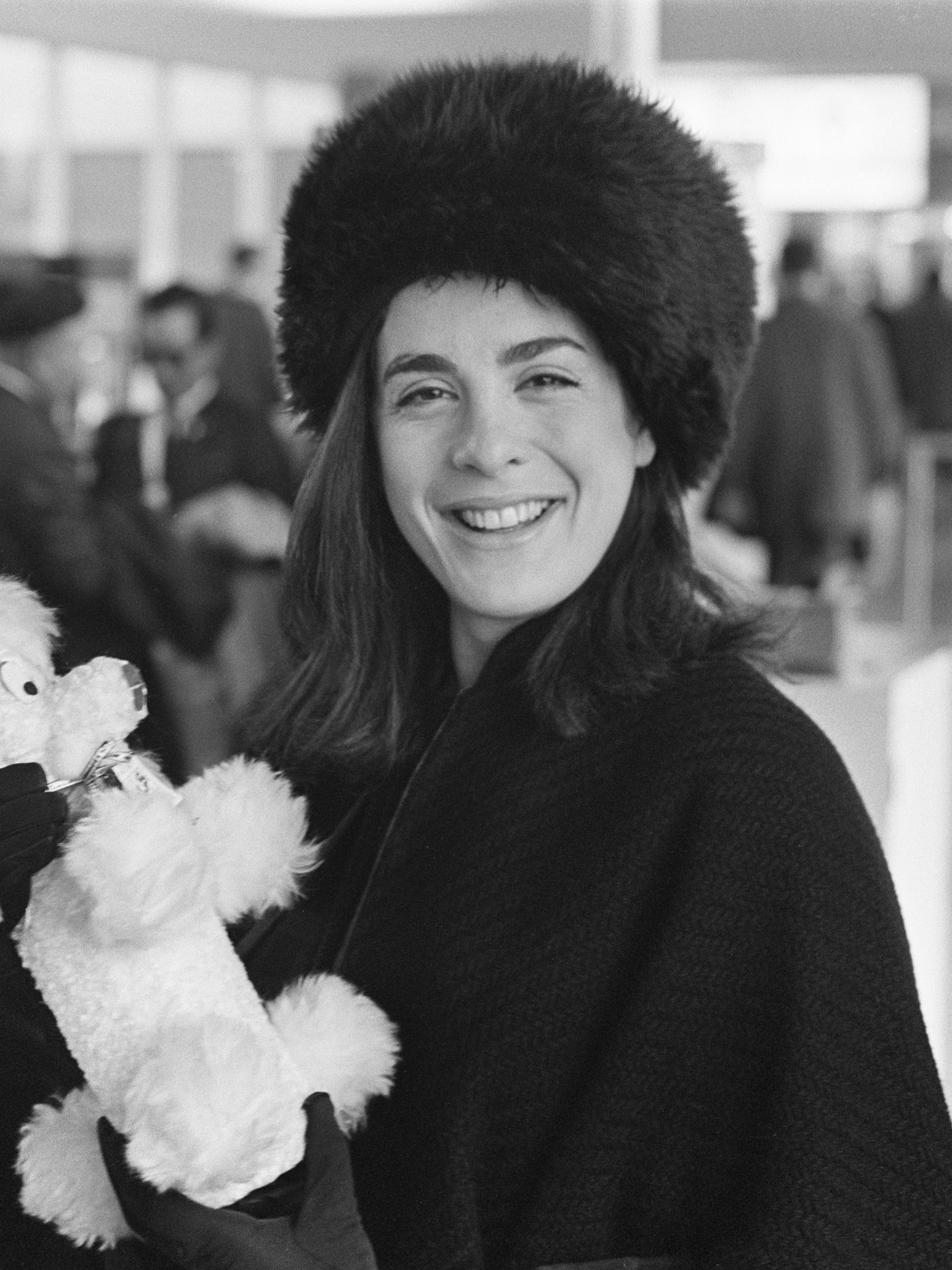
- Bron in 1968
- Born: 14 March 1938 (age 88); Stanmore, Middlesex, England
- Education: Newnham College, Cambridge
- Occupations: Actress; author
- Years active: 1959–2019
- Partner: Cedric Price (died 2003)

Eleanor Bron (born 14 March 1938) is an English stage, film and television actress, and an author. Her film roles include Ahme in the Beatles musical Help! (1965), the Doctor in Alfie (1966), Margaret Spencer in Bedazzled (1967) Hermione Roddice in Women in Love (1969), and Mrs Minchin in A Little Princess (1995). She has appeared in television series such as Yes Minister (1982), Doctor Who (1985) and Absolutely Fabulous.

== Early life ==
Bron was born on 14 March 1938 in Stanmore, Middlesex, into a Jewish family. Before her birth, her father Sydney had legally changed his name from Bronstein to Bron, in an effort to enhance his newly founded commercial enterprise, Bron's Orchestral Service. Her elder brother was the record producer Gerry Bron.

She attended the North London Collegiate School and then Newnham College, Cambridge, where she read Modern Languages. She later characterised her time at Newnham as "three years of unparalleled pampering and privilege".

== Career ==
=== Early work ===
Bron began her career in the Cambridge Footlights revue of 1959, titled The Last Laugh, in which Peter Cook also appeared. The addition of a female performer to the Footlights was a departure; until that time it had been all-male, with female characters portrayed in drag.

=== Film appearances ===
Bron's film appearances include the role of Ahme in the Beatles' film Help! (1965); her name may have been one of the inspirations for Paul McCartney when he composed "Eleanor Rigby". Other roles included the doctor who grounds Michael Caine's character in Alfie (1966), the unattainable Margaret Spencer in Peter Cook and Dudley Moore's film Bedazzled (1967), Hermione Roddice in Ken Russell's Women in Love (1969), and Sisters McFee and MacArthur in The National Health (1973).

She also appeared in the films Two for the Road (1967) alongside Albert Finney and Audrey Hepburn, and A Touch of Love (1969) with Sandy Dennis and Ian McKellen. She later appeared in film adaptations of Black Beauty (1994), and A Little Princess (1995).

=== Television work ===
Bron's earliest work for television included appearances on David Frost's Not So Much a Programme, More a Way of Life, My Father Knew Lloyd George and BBC-3, where she performed in sketches with John Fortune; they had already worked together at Peter Cook's Establishment Club. Later, her work included such programmes as Where Was Spring? (1969, also alongside Fortune), World in Ferment (1969), and After That, This (1975).

She collaborated with novelist and playwright Michael Frayn on the BBC programmes Beyond a Joke (1972) and Making Faces (1975).

From the mid-1970s, Bron made occasional appearances with the Monty Python team, such as The Secret Policeman's Ball series of concerts in support of Amnesty International. She adapted the Jilly Cooper novel Emily for television in 1976. She appeared in "Equal Opportunities", a 1982 episode of the BBC series Yes Minister, playing a senior civil servant in Jim Hacker's Department. Hacker plans to promote her—ostensibly to strike a blow for women's rights—only to be sorely disappointed.

In 1979 Bron appeared as Maggie Hartley, a stage actress accused of murder, in an episode of the popular British legal series Rumpole of the Bailey, entitled "Rumpole and the Show Folk", which starred Leo McKern in the title role. She and Leo McKern had appeared together in Help!. She appeared as Mary in The Day Christ Died (1980), and played Mrs Barrymore in the 1983 TV movie The Hound of the Baskervilles which starred Ian Richardson as Sherlock Holmes. That year also saw her appearance in an episode of Tales of the Unexpected (Series 6, The Tribute).

Bron appeared twice in the original series of Doctor Who. She had a brief comedic scene in the serial City of Death (1979) alongside John Cleese, which was at the suggestion of its co-writer Douglas Adams. The pair are art critics in Denise Rene's art gallery in Paris who are admiring the TARDIS (which they think to be a piece of art), when the Doctor (Tom Baker), Romana (Lalla Ward), and Duggan (Tom Chadbon) rush into it and it dematerialises. Bron's character, believing this to be part of the work, states that it is "Exquisite, absolutely exquisite!" She also had the main guest billing as the villain Kara in the Colin Baker era serial Revelation of the Daleks (1985). Bron later appeared in the Doctor Who audio drama Loups-Garoux (2001) starring Peter Davison, in which she played the wealthy heiress Ileana de Santos.

Bron played an art critic again in 1990, appearing in the BBC sketch comedy show French and Saunders in a parody of an Andy Warhol documentary. Later she made frequent appearances in Jennifer Saunders' television series Absolutely Fabulous. Bron played, via flashback, the recurring character of Patsy's mother, a woman who "scattered bastard babies across Europe like a garden sprinkler". After giving birth, she would always say "Now take it away! And bring me another lover." In 1992, she played Maria Lazlos in an episode of the first series of Heartbeat. She had a supporting role in the 1994 BBC ghost story The Blue Boy, and also appeared in the BBC's biographical TV movie Saint-Ex in 1996. She also narrated an episode on Wild Discovery.

=== Stage appearances ===
In 1973 Bron appeared in the West End musical The Card. Throughout the 1980s she appeared in Amnesty International's The Secret Policeman's Ball live benefit shows, working alongside Peter Cook and Rowan Atkinson, starting with the stage show that preceded those, A Poke in the Eye (With a Sharp Stick) in 1976. In 2005 she appeared at the Liverpool Empire Theatre in the musical play Twopence to Cross the Mersey. She appeared in the role of an abbess in Howard Brenton's play In Extremis, staged at Shakespeare's Globe in 2007. She also appeared in the dramatised version of Pedro Almodóvar's film All About My Mother, which opened at the Old Vic theatre in the late summer of 2007.

Bron also gave the premiere performance of The Yellow Cake Revue (1980), a series of pieces for voice and piano written by Peter Maxwell Davies in protest against uranium mining in the Orkney Islands. Bron has written and performed new verses for Camille Saint-Saëns' The Carnival of the Animals. She has also performed and recorded the female reciter part in William Walton's Façade (entertainment) with the Nash Ensemble.

=== Since 1985 ===
In 1985 Bron was selected, for her authoritative tone, to become "the voice of BT" and can still be heard on various British telephone error messages such as "The number you have dialled has not been recognised, please check and try again".

In 1998, Bron appeared as Frau Luther in episode 2 "Stuckart" of the BBC Radio 4 adaptation of Fatherland, a novel by Robert Harris.

In 2001 and 2002, she appeared in the BBC radio comedy sketch show The Right Time, along with Graeme Garden, Paula Wilcox, Clive Swift, and Neil Innes. Another notable radio appearance was in The Further Adventures of Sherlock Holmes in the 2002 episode "The Madness of Colonel Warburton". In 2001 she played the great-grandmother in the seven-part ITV series Gypsy Girl, based on books by Elizabeth Arnold.

In 2006, she narrated the BBC Radio 4 adaptation of the Craig Brown book 1966 and All That. Her other voice work includes a recorded tour of Sir John Soane's Museum in London, England.

In April 2010, Bron, along with Ian McKellen and Brian Cox, appeared in a series of TV advertisements to support Age UK, the charity recently formed from the merger of Age Concern and Help the Aged. All three actors gave their time free of charge.

In June 2010, she guest-starred in Foyle's War in the episode "The Russian House". She appeared in the long-running British TV series Midsomer Murders as Lady Isobel DeQuetteville in the episode "The Dark Rider", first aired on ITV1 on 1 February 2012, later returning to the series in 2019 when she appeared as Maxine Dobson in "The Miniature Murders."

On 25 December 2013, Bron appeared on BBC One in The Tractate Middoth, an adaptation of the M.R. James ghost story The Tractate Middoth. On 25 July 2014, she joined the cast of radio soap The Archers, playing the part of Carol Tregorran. She last appeared in the programme in September 2018. The part of Carol was taken over by Mia Soteriou in March 2026.

In November–December 2019, Bron read Salley Vickers's Grandmothers in 10 parts on BBC Radio 4.

== Personal life ==
Bron was the partner of the architect Cedric Price for many years until his death in 2003; they had no children. Bron is a pescetarian.

== Filmography ==
Year	Title	Role	Notes
1965	Help!	Ahme	
1966	Alfie	The Doctor	
1967	Two for the Road	Cathy Manchester	
1967	Bedazzled	Margaret	
1969	A Touch of Love	Lydia	
1969	Women in Love	Hermione Roddice	
1970	Cucumber Castle	Lady Margerie Pee	TV movie
1973	The National Health	Sister McFee / Sister Mary MacArthur	
1979	Rumpole of the Bailey	Maggie Hartley	Series 2, Episode 3 ('Rumpole and the Show Folk')
1979	Doctor Who	Art Gallery Visitor	Cameo; City of Death Part 4
1980	The Day Christ Died	Mary	TV movie
1982	Yes Minister	Undersecretary Sarah Harrison	Series 3, Episode 1 ('Equal Opportunities')
1983	The Hound of the Baskervilles	Mrs Barrymore	
1985	Turtle Diary	Miss Neap (Flora)	
1985	Doctor Who	Kara	Series 22, Episode 6 ('Revelation of the Daleks')
1987	Little Dorrit	Mrs. Merdle	
1994	Deadly Advice	Judge	
1995	Black Beauty	Lady Wexmire	
1995	A Little Princess	Mrs Minchin	
1996	Saint-Ex	Marie de Saint-Exupéry	
2000	The House of Mirth	Mrs. Julia Peniston, Lily's Aunt	
2001	Iris	Principal	
2002	The Heart of Me	Mrs. Burkett / Madeleine and Dinah's mother	
2004	Love's Brother	Signora Carmellina	
2004	Wimbledon	Augusta Colt	
2010	StreetDance 3D	Madame Fleurie	
2010	Foyle's War	Elsa Konstantin	Series 6, Episode 1 ('The Russian House')
2012	Hyde Park on Hudson	Daisy's Aunt	
2012	Midsomer Murders	Izzy de Quetteville	Series 15, Episode 1 ('The Dark Rider')
2013	The Tractate Middoth	Mrs Goundry	
2014	Stella	Anna Jackson	
2015	Life in Squares	Aunt Mary	
2020	Midsomer Murders	Maxine Dobson	Series 21, Episode 2 ('The Miniature Murders')

== Selected theatre performances ==
- Elena Andreyevna in Uncle Vanya by Anton Chekhov. Directed by Michael Elliott at the Royal Exchange, Manchester (1977)
- Monica Reed in Present Laughter by Noël Coward. Directed by James Maxwell at the Royal Exchange, Manchester (1977)
- Margaret Barrett in A Family by Ronald Harwood. World premiere directed by Casper Wrede at the Royal Exchange, Manchester (1978)
- Heartbreak House by George Bernard Shaw. Directed by Jonathon Hales at the Royal Exchange, Manchester (1981)
- Jean Brodie in The Prime of Miss Jean Brodie by Muriel Spark. Directed by John Dove at the Royal Exchange, Manchester (1984)
- Jocasta in Oedipus by Sophocles. Directed by Casper Wrede at the Royal Exchange, Manchester (1987)
- Lady Caroline Pontefract in A Woman of No Importance at the Vaudeville Theatre, London (2017)

== Writer ==
She is the author of several books, including Life and Other Punctures, a 1978 account of bicycling in France and Holland on a Moulton bicycle; and Cedric Price Retriever, an inventory of the contents of the bookshelves of her late partner, architect Cedric Price.

=== Publications ===
- Bron, Eleanor; Fortune, John (1972). Is Your Marriage Really Necessary?. Methuen. ISBN 0-413-29450-1.
- Bron, Eleanor (1978). Life and Other Punctures. A. Deutsch. ISBN 978-0-233-97008-0.
- Bron, Eleanor (1985). The Pillow Book of Eleanor Bron, or, An Actress Despairs. Jonathan Cape Ltd. ISBN 0-224-02142-7.
- Bron, Eleanor (1988). Eleonora Duse. Blackwell. ISBN 0-86068-569-1.
- Bron, Eleanor (1997). Double Take. Orion. ISBN 1-85799-883-9.
- Bron, Eleanor; Hardingham, Samantha (2006). Cedric Price Retriever. Institute of International Visual Art. ISBN 1-899846-42-5.

== Cultural influences ==
She is mentioned in the Yo La Tengo song "Tom Courtenay": "...dreaming 'bout Eleanor Bron, in my room with the curtains drawn...".
