= The Psychic (play) =

2026 play

- Original language: English
- Written by: Jeremy Dyson; Andy Nyman
- Genre: Psychological thriller

Premiere
- Date: 29 April 2026
- Place: York Theatre Royal

The Psychic is a psychological thriller play by Jeremy Dyson and Andy Nyman.

== Production history ==
The play made its world premiere at the York Theatre Royal from 29 April (with a press night on 6 May) running until 23 May 2026. The production is directed by Dyson and Nyman, set and costume designed by Rae Smith, lighting designed by Zoe Spurr, sound designed by Nick Manning, illusions designed by Chris Fisher and video designed by Duncan Mclean. Full casting was announced on 24 May 2026.

== Cast and characters ==
Character	York
Character	2026
Sheila Gold	Eileen Walsh
Rosa	Frances Barber
Tara	Megan Placito
Robert Hamm	Dave Hearn
Deepak	Jaz Singh Deol
Nisha	Nikhita Lesler
Mark	Charlie Blanshard
