= Selina Griffiths =

British actress (born 1969)

- Born: Selina Jane Griffiths; 1969 (age 56–57); Richmond upon Thames, London, England
- Education: Central School of Speech and Drama
- Occupation: Actress
- Children: 2
- Parent(s): Annette Crosbie; Michael Griffiths

Selina Jane Griffiths (born 1969) is a British actress mostly known for her performances in sitcoms. She played Pauline Maltby in the ITV comedy series Benidorm. She is the daughter of Annette Crosbie.

== Early life ==
Selina Griffiths is the daughter of Annette Crosbie and Michael Griffiths. She trained at the Central School of Speech and Drama and has appeared in several plays. Having graduated from the Central School of Speech and Drama, she made her professional stage debut at London's Lyric Theatre in The Way of the World alongside Barbara Flynn, with whom she appeared in television's Cranford.

== Career ==
Griffiths has appeared in many television programmes, including Doctor Finlay and Drop the Dead Donkey and playing Janet in The Smoking Room.

In autumn 2007 she co-starred with Deborah Findlay in the BBC1 costume drama series Cranford playing Miss Caroline Tomkinson. In January 2011 she appeared as a frightened passenger in the BBC1 comedy series Come Fly With Me, which is written by Matt Lucas and David Walliams.

In February 2011, she appeared as Pauline in Benidorm, reprising the role in the 2016 & 2018 series and through March–April appeared in the Jeremy Dyson play adaption of Roald Dahl's Twisted Tales.

In March 2012 she appeared as Yvonne Bradshaw in the BBC3 series Being Human. Later that year she played several roles, including Beatrix Potter, in Sky's Psychobitches (part of Playhouse Presents), appearing in four episodes. She also plays Connie in BBC comedy Cuckoo.

Airing on 26 May 2013, Griffiths appeared in episode 2 (Nobody's Darling) of Case Histories.

In 2014 she appeared in the TV show Jonathan Creek. In 2015 she appeared as Elspeth Rice in ITV's Midsomer Murders episode 17.4 "A Vintage Murder".

In February 2017 she appeared as a primary school head teacher Miss Anstis in the BBC sitcom Not Going Out starring Lee Mack and Sally Bretton. She reprised the role in April 2019, and again in 2023, by which time the character had become a secondary school headteacher.

In January 2019 she appeared as Ruth Thundersby in BBC's Father Brown.

In 2024, she appeared in the Disney+ series Rivals as Enid Spinks, based on the Jilly Cooper novel of the same name.

== Filmography ==
- Doctor Finlay "Old Flames" (1995) as Pamela
- The Smoking Room (2004–2006) as Janet, 16 episodes
- Cranford (2007) as Caroline Tomkinson
- Benidorm (2011, 2016–2018) as Pauline Maltby, an alcoholic, 16 episodes
- Holy Flying Circus (2011) as Production Person 2/Personal Assistant to BBC Head of Rude Words
- Playhouse Presents (TV series) "Psychobitches" (2012) as Beatrix Potter/Anna Freud
- Being Human "Hold the Front Page" (2012) as Yvonne Bradshaw
- Cuckoo (2012–2014, 2018) as Connie, 11 episodes
- Case Histories TV series episode 2 (2013) as Sacha
- Trollied "Christmas Special" (2013) as Helen
- Count Arthur Strong episode 3 "The Radio Play" (2013) as Rachael
- Jonathan Creek "The Sinner and the Sandman" (2014) as Alison Chater
- Midsomer Murders "A Vintage Murder" (2015) as Elspeth Rice
- Not Going Out (2017, 2019, 2023) "Charlie", "Facts of Life", "Day Out" as Miss Anstis
- Quacks "The Bishop's Appendix", "The Duke's Tracheotomy" (2017) as Matron
- Early Man (2018) as Magma (voice)
- Father Brown "The Passing Bell" (2019) as Ruth Thundersby
- Doctors (2019) "Trouble in Mind" as Anna Butler
- Dial M for Middlesbrough (2019) as Mary
- The Larkins (2021–2022) as Norma Norman
- Rivals (2024–) as Dame Enid Spink
