= Beyond a Joke (2009 TV series) =

2009 British documentary about sitcoms

Beyond a Joke is a 2009 ITV3 documentary series exploring the social context of classic and contemporary British sitcoms. The documentary featured clips from the sitcoms and interviews with a variety of celebrities and experts, including John Cleese, Paul Nicholas, Tony Benn, Carla Lane, Jonathan Harvey, Don Warrington, Ian Lavender, Nina Myskow, Andrew Sachs, Edwina Currie and Vanessa Feltz. It was narrated by Dave Lamb.

== Episodes ==
No.	Title	Original release date
1	"Class Apart"	4 May 2009
A examination of the influence of class on 1970s and 1980s comedy.
2	"The Birds The Blokes And The Bees"	11 May 2009
A consideration of the way sitcoms deal with sex, love and romance.
3	"Politically Incorrect"	18 May 2009
A look at the humour of politically incorrect sitcoms.
4	"Working Life"	25 May 2009
Considering the economic situation of the 1970s and 1980s, a look at how sitcoms dealt with political issues.
5	"The Legacy"	1 June 2009
A look at the extent to which contemporary sitcoms have taken influence from classic sitcoms, as well as looking to the future.
