= Le Serpent =

Le Serpent may refer to:

- Le Serpent (1973 film), or Night Flight from Moscow, a Cold War spy thriller directed by Henri Verneuil
- Le Serpent (2006 film), or The Serpent, a French thriller directed by Éric Barbier

== See also ==
- Serpent (disambiguation)
