= Beyond a Joke (1972 TV series) =

- Genre: Comedy sketch show
- Starring: Eleanor Bron, John Bird, Barrie Ingham
- Country of origin: United Kingdom

Original release
- Network: BBC2

Beyond a Joke is a BBC comedy sketch show series broadcast in 1972 starring Eleanor Bron, John Bird and Barrie Ingham with writing contributions from Michael Frayn. Sketches from the series were shown in 2014 on The Comedy Vaults: BBC Two’s Hidden Treasure, part of BBC2's 50th birthday celebrations.
