= Nicholas Burns (actor) =

English actor (born 1977)

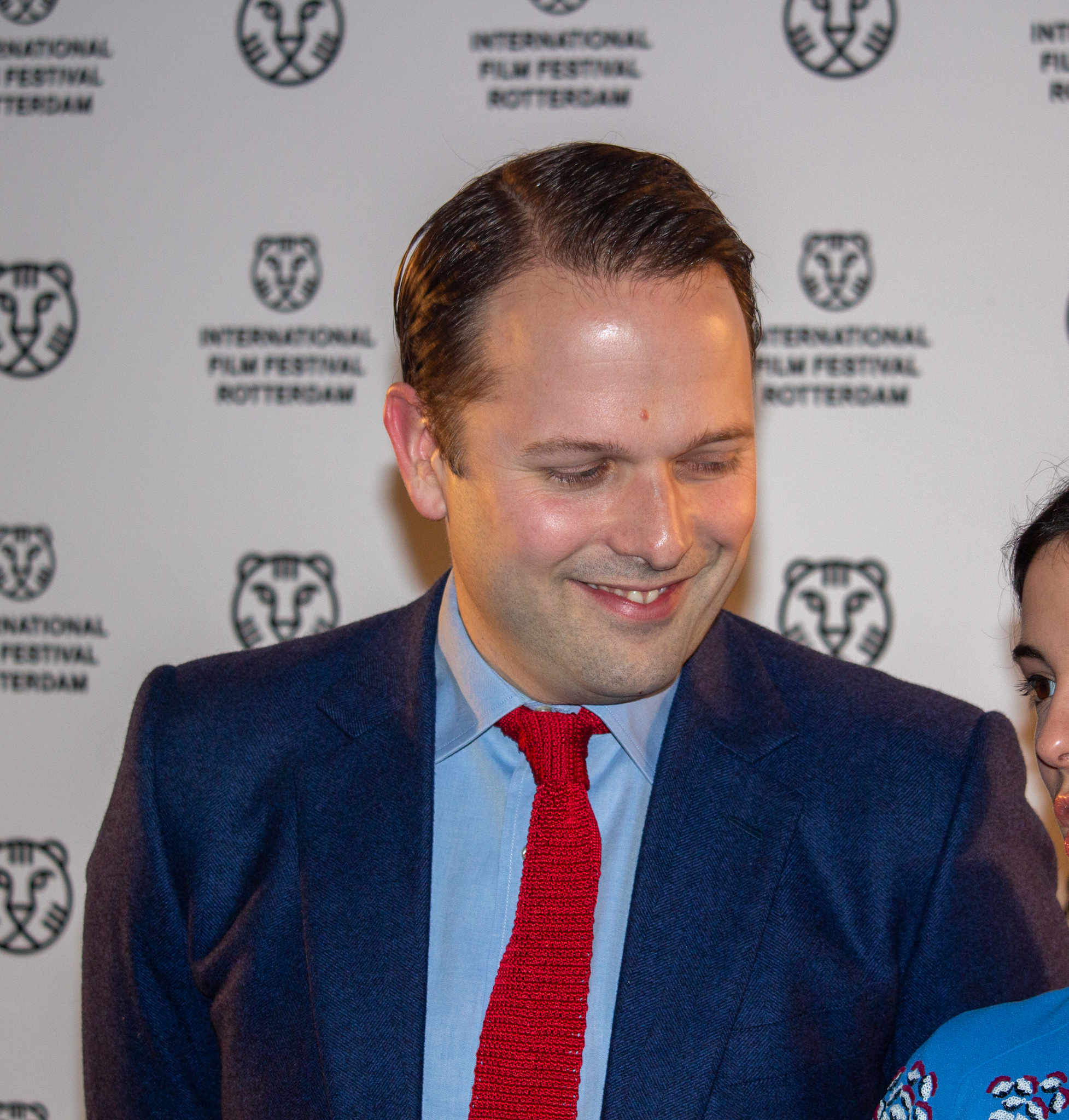
- Burns at the IFFR 2015
- Born: 1977 (age 48–49); Derby, England
- Education: London Academy of Music and Dramatic Art
- Occupation: Actor
- Years active: 2002–present
- Known for: Nathan Barley; Benidorm
- Children: 3

Nicholas Burns (born 1977) is an English actor, best known for his comic performance as the title character in Nathan Barley (2005). He played Martin Weedon in the ITV sitcom Benidorm (2007–2009, 2014) and Alex in No Heroics (2008). His other credits include The Mighty Boosh (2005), The IT Crowd (2007), Doctor Who, The Crown, (both 2017), Manhunt (2019), Strike (2020), The Serpent Queen (2022–2024), A Small Light and Black Mirror (both 2023).

== Early life ==
Burns was born in 1977 in Derby, and educated at Repton School. He trained at the London Academy of Music and Dramatic Art (LAMDA).

== Career ==
In 2005, Burns played the titular leading role in the Channel 4 comedy Nathan Barley. Burns has had recurring roles in the TV series Absolute Power, Roman's Empire, and the sketch show Man Stroke Woman. Burns also made an appearance in The Mighty Boosh as the ruler of the planet Xooberon; in The IT Crowd as Jerome, the director of a musical called Gay!; and in episode "At Bertram's Hotel" of Agatha Christie's Marple as Jack and Joel Britten. He had the role of an Australian tennis coach in The McClintock Factor, a mockumentary chronicling the rise and fall of the former media tycoon and internet blogger Jeremy McClintock.

Burns played a main role as Martin Weedon in the first three series of the ITV holiday comedy Benidorm, alongside a cast that included Abigail Cruttenden, who played his wife, Sheridan Smith and Johnny Vegas.

In 2014 he began playing Errol's father, Ben, in the BBC series Uncle and he starred in all 3 series (2014 - 2017).

Burns' stage credits include Much Ado About Nothing at the Sheffield Crucible Theatre, the satire The Madness of George Dubya and Ghost Stories, both of which transferred to London's West End, Penelope Skinner's The Village Bike at the Royal Court, The Recruiting Officer at the Donmar Warehouse and Pinero's The Magistrate at the Royal National Theatre, a production included in season 4 of National Theatre Live.

In April 2013, he returned to Benidorm as Martin Weedon, for series 6 of the show in 2014.

In 2020, Burns appeared in series four of Strike and in Small Axe. In 2022, he played the role of Antoine de Bourbon in Starz's The Serpent Queen, alongside Samantha Morton and Liv Hill.

In 2023, he starred as Keith Holligan in the series 6 episode "Demon 79" of Netflix's Black Mirror, alongside Anjana Vasan and in A Small Light as Victor Kugler.

== Personal life ==
Burns is a lifelong supporter of Derby County F.C. He has two sons and a daughter, Arthur, Ralph and Dora.

== Filmography ==
=== Film ===
Year	Film	Role	Notes
2013	The World's End	Collaborator	
2014	War Book	James	
2015	The Lady in the Van	Giles Perry	
2017	Ghost Stories	Mark Van Rhys	
2018	The Little Stranger	Peter Baker-Hyde	
2019	Hope Gap	Gary	
2020	Emma	Mr. Cole	
2021	Censor	Sanderson	
2022	Allelujah	Minister	

=== Television ===
Year	Title	Role	Notes
2002	Surrealissimo: The Scandalous Success of Salvador Dali	Young Artist	Television film
2002	The Bill	Simon Beaumont	Episode: "005"
2002	EastEnders	Adam	1 episode
2002	The House That Jack Built	Richard Asquith	Episode: "Dogs Don't Wear Hard Hats"
2003	Manchild	Max	Episode #2.4
2003	The Inspector Lynley Mysteries	Mick Cambrey	Episode: "A Suitable Vengeance"
2003	Cambridge Spies	Rightwing Student	Episode #1.1
2003–2005	Absolute Power	Nick Mayer	12 episodes
2004	A Touch of Frost	DC Tranter	Episode: "Dancing in the Dark"
2004	Swiss Toni		Episode: "Speed Date"
2005	The Mighty Boosh	The King	Episode: "Fountain of Youth"
2005	Nathan Barley	Nathan Barley	7 episodes
2005–2007	Man Stroke Woman	Various	12 episodes
2006	Fear of Fanny	Christopher	Television film
2006	Born Equal	Michael	Television film
2007	Agatha Christie's Marple	Jack & Joel Britten	Series 3, episode: "At Bertram's Hotel"
2007	Roman's Empire	Seb	5 episodes
2007	The IT Crowd	Jerome	Episode: "The Work Outing"
2007	Comedy Showcase	Rick Parish	Episode: "Other People"
2007–2009, 2014	Benidorm	Martin Weedon	Series regular, 23 episodes (series 1–3, 6)
2008	Never Better	Charlie	Episode: "First Week Euphoria"
2008	No Heroics	The Hotness	6 episodes
2009	Monday Monday	Nathan	Episode #1.3
2009	Misfits	PC Wilson	Episode #1.2
2009	Mister Eleven	Eddie	2 episodes
2010	Trinny & Susannah: From Boom to Bust	Leonard	Television film
2011	The Sinking of the Laconia	Captain Coutts	Television film
2011	Psychoville	Mark	Episode: "Hancock"
2012	New Tricks	DCI Rosser	Episode: "Blue Flower"
2012	Switch	Julian	Episode #1.3
2012	Eggbox	Mr. Bruce	Television film
2013	Agatha Christie's Poirot	Inspector Meadows	Episode: "The Big Four"
2013	The Tractate Middoth	George Earl	Television film
2014	The Crimson Field	Major Gerard Yelling	Episode #1.3
2014–2017	Crackanory	Various	4 episodes
2014–2017	Uncle	Ben	11 episodes
2015	Coalition	Ed Balls	Television film
2015	The Vote	Kenneth Robson	Television film
2015–2016	Marley's Ghosts	Michael	9 episodes
2016	Houdini & Doyle	Frederick Batch	Episode: "In Manus Dei"
2016	Drunk History	Policeman	Episode: "Battle of Waterloo/Arthur Conan Doyle"
2016	A Midsummer Night's Dream	Theseus	Television film
2017	Doctor Who	Lord Sutcliffe	Episode: "Thin Ice"
2017	The Crown	Anthony Nutting	Episodes: "Lisbon" and "Misadventure"
2017	The Tunnel	Richard Carver	2 episodes
2018	Wannabe	Neil Clark	4 episodes
2018	Midsomer Murders	Barrett Lounds	Episode: "Drawing Dead"
2019	Manhunt	DI Richard Ambrose	3 episodes
2019	Harlots	Lord Leadsom	8 episodes
2020	Strike	Torquil	Episode: "Lethal White: Part 3"
2020	Red, White and Blue	Mr. Purling	Part of Small Axe anthology
2022	SAS: Rogue Heroes	Pilot	Episode #1.3
2022–2024	The Serpent Queen	Antoine de Bourbon	13 episodes
2023	A Small Light	Victor Kugler	TV miniseries, 7 episodes
2023	Black Mirror	Keith Holligan	Episode: "Demon 79"
2026	Death in Paradise	Rory Lyons	Episode #15.8
