= Andy Nyman =

English actor, director and writer

- Born: Andrew Nyman; 13 April 1966 (age 60); Leicester, Leicestershire, England
- Education: Guildhall School of Music and Drama
- Occupations: Actor; director; writer; singer; magician
- Years active: 1989–present
- Spouse: Sophie Abbott (?–2025; her death)
- Children: 2
- Website: AndyNyman.com

Andrew Nyman (born 13 April 1966) is an English actor, director, writer, singer and magician. He is best known for his work with illusionist Derren Brown and for co-creating and starring in the horror play Ghost Stories and its film adaptation with Jeremy Dyson. He has been nominated for the Laurence Olivier Award for his performances in the West End revivals of Fiddler on the Roof, Hello, Dolly! and The Producers.

== Early life and career ==
Nyman's first noteworthy performance was in 2000 as Keith Whitehead in Dead Babies, an adaptation of the Martin Amis novel of the same name. Soon after he appeared alongside Jon Voight, David Schwimmer and Leelee Sobieski in Jon Avnet's 2001 Emmy award-winning film Uprising as a Polish-Jewish freedom fighter.

His next film role was in the 2003 film Coney Island Baby as a gay French gun dealer. In 2006 he appeared in horror-comedy Severance, Herman Brood biopic Wild Romance and British romcom Are You Ready for Love?. That same year Nyman won the award for best actor at the 2006 Cherbourg-Octeville Festival of Irish & British Film for his role as Colin Frampton in Shut Up and Shoot Me. In 2007, Nyman appeared as one of the leads in the Frank Oz film Death at a Funeral, starring opposite Matthew Macfadyen, Ewen Bremner and Keely Hawes. In 2008, he starred as Patrick, a sleazy reality show producer, in Charlie Brooker's E4 horror satire Dead Set, and appeared in BBC Four's supernatural drama series Crooked House.

Nyman portrayed the recurring character Jonty de Wolf in Channel 4's semi-improvised show Campus. In 2013, he appeared in Kick-Ass 2, as "The Tumor". He did voice over work as the character Bag for the series Sarah & Duck and Chuggington, and portrayed a young Winston Churchill in the BBC drama Peaky Blinders. In 2014 Nyman played the role of Charles Guiteau in the Stephen Sondheim musical Assassins at the Menier Chocolate Factory, and appeared in the film Automata with Antonio Banderas and Dylan McDermott.

In 2014, Nyman was one of 200 public figures who were signatories to a letter to The Guardian opposing Scottish independence in the run-up to September's referendum on that issue.

== Work with Derren Brown ==
As an accomplished magician and mentalist, Nyman has frequently collaborated with psychological illusionist Derren Brown. He is the co-creator and co-writer of the television shows Derren Brown – Mind Control and Trick of the Mind. He and Brown wrote Russian Roulette, Séance and Messiah, as well as three series of Trick of the Mind. He also co-wrote and co-directed four of Brown's stage shows, all of which have toured and played the West End. For Something Wicked This Way Comes they were awarded the 2006 Olivier Award for Best Entertainment.

Their fourth show Enigma was also nominated for Olivier Award 2010, and he was nominated for the Lew Grade Award at the 2007 BAFTA Awards for his work on Derren Brown: The Heist (alongside collaborators Derren Brown, Simon Mills and Ben Caron). Nyman shares some of his magic "know-how" in the DVD, Insane. Their latest collaboration is entitled Sacrifice, which opened in March 2015 in the UK, and was premiered on Netflix in 2018.

== Work with Jeremy Dyson ==
=== Ghost Stories ===
Nyman is co-creator of the long-running horror stage-play Ghost Stories. The show opened at the Liverpool Playhouse on 4 February 2010; from there it moved to the Lyric Theatre Hammersmith, before transferring to the Duke of York's Theatre in the West End, opening on 25 June 2010.

Since then it has played in Moscow and Toronto, and was nominated for two Olivier Awards in 2011, Best Sound and Best Entertainment. Nyman and Jeremy Dyson co-wrote the show and co-directed it along with Sean Holmes. The stage play Ghost Stories finished after 1,000 shows in the Duke of York's, on 15 March 2015.

A film adaptation premiered in 2017, starring Nyman, Paul Whitehouse and Martin Freeman.

=== The Warlock Effect ===
Nyman and Dyson are co-authors of the 2023 novel The Warlock Effect, a thriller about a magician who becomes involved with espionage in the 1950s. It was published by Hodder & Stoughton, and Nyman also narrated an audio version.

=== The Psychic ===
Nyman and Dyson have co-created a new stage play called The Psychic which had its world premiere at the York Theatre Royal from 29 April to 23 May 2026.

== Personal life ==
Nyman is Jewish and attended Jewish summer camp.

== Filmography ==
=== Film ===
Year	Title	Role(s)	Note
1999	The Criminal	Forensic Scientist 1	
2000	Dead Babies	Keith	
2000	Being Considered	Shoe Salesman/Chauffeur	
2003	Coney Island Baby	Franko	
2005	Zemanovaload	Bruce Robenitz	
2005	Shut Up and Shoot Me	Colin	
2006	Played	Danny	
2006	Severance	Gordon	
2006	Wild Romance	Leo Leitner	
2006	Are You Ready for Love?	Barry Schneider	
2007	Death at a Funeral	Howard	
2007	This Is What It Is	Chris	
2008	The Brothers Bloom	Charleston	
2009	The Tournament	Tech Eddie	
2010	Black Death	Dalywag	
2011	The Glass Man	Martin Pritte	
2013	Kick-Ass 2	The Tumor	
2014	ABCs of Death 2	Coke Dealer	Segment "A" (A is for Amateur)
2014	Autómata	Tom Ellis	
2015	Shaun the Sheep Movie	Nuts (voice)	
2015	Bone in the Throat	Ronnie the Rug	
2015	Minions	Additional voices	
2017	Despicable Me 3	Clive the Robot (voice)	
2017	Ghost Stories	Professor Phillip Goodman	Also a co-writer and a co-director
2017	Star Wars: The Last Jedi	Jail Guard	
2018	The Commuter	Tony	
2019	Judy	Dan	
2019	A Shaun the Sheep Movie: Farmageddon	Nuts (voice)	
2021	Jungle Cruise	Sir James Hobbs-Cunningham	
2024	That Christmas	Mr. Beccles (voice)	
2024	Wicked	Governor Frexspar Thropp	
2026	Shaun the Sheep: The Beast of Mossy Bottom	Nuts (voice)	

=== Television ===
Year	Title	Role	Notes
1989	Birds of a Feather	John	Episode: "Substitute"
1989	The Woman in Black	Jackie	Television film
1989-1995	The Bill	Various characters	3 episodes
1991	Five Children and It	Baker's Boy	Episode: "Episode Four"
1992	Archer's Goon	Museum Attendant	Episode #1.4
1995	Health and Efficiency	The Photographer	Episode: "You Bet Your Life"
1995	New Voices	Jim	Episode: "Spendaware Family"
1997	EastEnders	Neil Kaplan	1 episode
2000–2001	Peak Practice	Rob Hallet	2 episodes
2001	Baddiel's Syndrome	Ian the Valet Parker	Episode: "In the Valley of the Blind"
2001	Uprising	Calel Wasser	Television film
2002	The League of Gentlemen	Carl	Episode: "Turn Again Geoff Tipps"
2004	Coming Up	Leon	Episode: "Tame"
2008	Dead Set	Patrick Goad	5 episodes
2008	Crooked House	Nicholas Duncalfe	2 episodes
2008–2013	Chuggington	Chatsworth and Dunbar and Felix (voices)	62 episodes
2009	Comedy Showcase	Jonty de Wolfe	Episode: "Campus"
2009–2011	Campus	Jonty de Wolfe	7 episodes
2010	Captain Biceps	Civilians (voice)	Episode: "Taupeman"
2010–2011	The Cat in the Hat Knows a Lot About That!	Barry and Tango and Zapata (voices)	UK version only
2011	Timmy Time	Voice	Episode: "Timmy's Cookie"
2012	Chuggington: Badge Quest	Dunbar (voice)	Episode: "Safeguarder Wilson"
2012	Shaun the Sheep	Nuts (voice)	Episode: "Shaun the Fugitive"
2012	Olly the Little White Van	Various voices	Episode: "Train Trouble"
2012, 2014	Psychobitches	Various characters	2 episodes
2013	Holliston	Axl the Cat (voice)	Episode: "Blobby"
2013	Peaky Blinders	Winston Churchill	3 episodes
2013–2017	Sarah & Duck	Various voices	36 episodes
2015	The Eichmann Show	David Landor	Television film
2015	Ballot Monkeys	Gerry Stagg	5 episodes
2015	Shaun the Sheep: The Farmer's Llamas	Nuts	Television film
2016	Power Monkeys	Gerry	6 episodes
2017	Election Spy	James	9 episodes
2018	Wanderlust	James Marcham	4 episodes
2019	Hanna	Jacobs	3 episodes
2020	Shaun the Sheep: Adventures from Mossy Bottom	Voice	TV series
2021	Unforgotten	Dean Barton	6 episodes
2021	Grantchester	Roy Reeves	Episode #6.1
2021	Shaun the Sheep: The Flight Before Christmas	Additional voices	Television film
2022	Dodger	Sir Thomas Pettigrew	Episode: "Mummy"
2022, 2026	The Capture	Home Secretary Rowan Gill	8 episodes
2023	A Small Light	Hermann van Pels	7 episodes
2025	The Bombing of Pan Am 103	Edwin Bollier	Episode: 1.3

=== Theatre ===
Year	Title	Role	Venue
2010	Ghost Stories	Professor Phillip Goodman (also co-director and co-writer)	Liverpool Playhouse
2010	Ghost Stories	Professor Phillip Goodman (also co-director and co-writer)	Lyric Theatre Hammersmith
2010	Ghost Stories	Professor Phillip Goodman (also co-director and co-writer)	Duke of York's Theatre
2012	Abigail's Party	Laurence Moss	Menier Chocolate Factory
2012	Abigail's Party	Laurence Moss	Wyndham's Theatre
2014-15	Assassins	Charles J. Guiteau	Menier Chocolate Factory
2015	Hangmen	Syd	Wyndham's Theatre
2018-19	Fiddler on the Roof	Tevye	Menier Chocolate Factory
2019	Fiddler on the Roof	Tevye	Playhouse Theatre
2022	Leopoldstadt	Hermann	Princess of Wales Theatre
2022	Hangmen	Syd	John Golden Theatre
2024	Hello, Dolly!	Horace Vandergelder	London Palladium
2024-25	The Producers	Max Bialystock	Menier Chocolate Factory
2025-26	The Producers	Max Bialystock	Garrick Theatre
2026	The Psychic	Co-director and co-writer	York Theatre Royal

== Awards and nominations ==
=== Theatre ===
Year	Award	Category	Work	Result	Ref.
2006	Laurence Olivier Award	Best Entertainment	Something Wicked This Way Comes	Won	
2010	Laurence Olivier Award	Best Entertainment	Enigma	Nominated	
2011	Laurence Olivier Award	Best Entertainment	Ghost Stories	Nominated	
2018	Drama Desk Award	Unique Theatrical Experience	Derren Brown: Secret	Won	
2019	Evening Standard Theatre Award	Best Musical Performance	Fiddler on the Roof	Nominated	
2020	Laurence Olivier Award	Best Actor in a Musical	Fiddler on the Roof	Nominated	
2025	Laurence Olivier Award	Best Actor in a Supporting Role in a Musical	Hello, Dolly!	Nominated	
2026	Evening Standard Theatre Award	Best Musical Performance	The Producers	Nominated	
2026	Laurence Olivier Award	Best Actor in a Musical	The Producers	Nominated	

=== Other ===
- 2006 – Cherbourg-Octeville Festival of Irish and British Film – Best Actor – Shut Up and Shoot Me
- 2008 – Member of the Inner Magic Circle
