= Jeremy Dyson =

British screenwriter (born 1966)

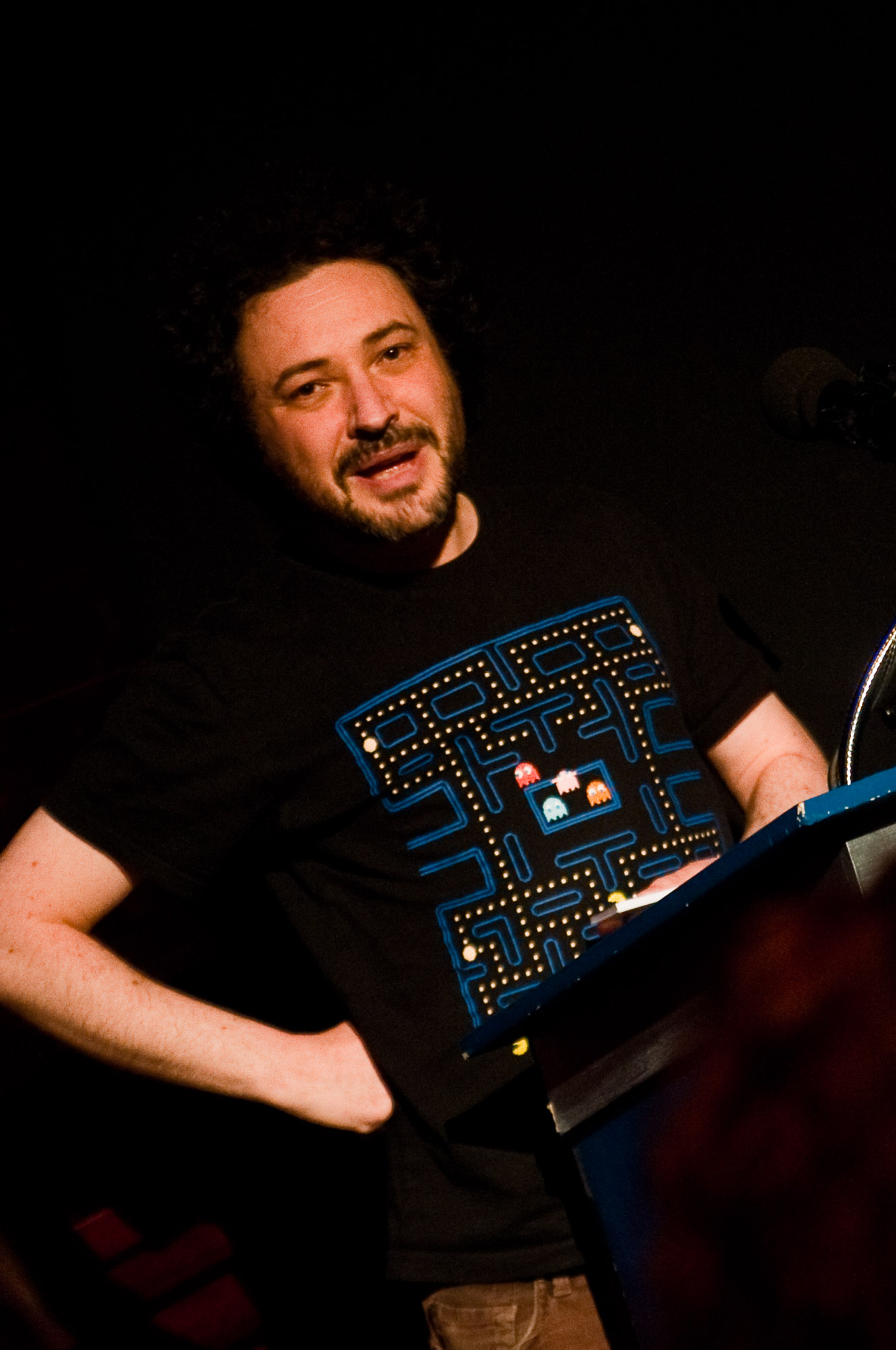
- Dyson at the Fantastic Films Weekend in 2010
- Born: 14 June 1966 (age 60); Leeds, West Yorkshire, UK
- Education: Leeds Grammar School
- Alma mater: University of Leeds (B.A.); Northern Film School (M.A.)
- Occupations: Writer; screenwriter; author; musician
- Years active: 1993–present
- Spouse: Nicola Clarke (m. 2002)
- Children: 2

Jeremy Dyson (born 14 June 1966) is a British author, musician and screenwriter who, along with Mark Gatiss, Steve Pemberton and Reece Shearsmith, is one of the League of Gentlemen. He also created and co-wrote the West End show Ghost Stories and its film adaptation.

== Early life ==
Dyson was born in Leeds, West Yorkshire, England, son of Elaine Saville and Melvin Dyson. He has one older brother, Andrew Dyson, and a younger sister, Jayne Dyson. He was educated at Leeds Grammar School, now The Grammar School at Leeds. He studied Philosophy at the University of Leeds and later completed an MA in screenwriting at the Northern Film School. He lived in Highbury, London, but now lives in Ilkley, West Yorkshire. Jeremy is also Jewish, raised in a kosher home; though no longer practising, it often appears in his work.

== Career ==
Dyson is the co-creator of the West End play Ghost Stories, and a member of the sketch comedy team The League of Gentlemen, the latter along with fellow performers Mark Gatiss, Steve Pemberton, and Reece Shearsmith, all of whom he met while they were studying at Bretton Hall drama school. The League of Gentlemen initially began as a stage act in 1995, which was then transferred to BBC Radio 4 in 1997 as On the Town with the League of Gentlemen, and then became a television series on BBC Two in 1999. The latter saw Dyson and his colleagues awarded a British Academy Television Award, a Royal Television Society Award, and the prestigious Golden Rose of Montreux.

Dyson has written several books including Bright Darkness: Lost Art of the Supernatural Horror Film, a non-fiction guide to horror films, and two collections of short stories entitled Never Trust a Rabbit – short-listed for the Macmillan Silver Pen award – and The Cranes That Build The Cranes which won the 2010 Edge Hill award. Five stories from Never Trust a Rabbit were read on BBC Radio 4 in 2000. In 2023, following the closure of the NatWest bank, the Leeds location of the Cash-Point Oracle from Never Trust a Rabbit was given historical landmark status by Google. His novel What Happens Now was published on 6 April 2006 to favourable reviews and was nominated for the Goss first novel award.

He co-created (with Simon Ashdown) the BAFTA-nominated television series Funland, which aired on BBC Three, and wrote the Billy Goats Gruff episode of the BBC's 2008 series Fairy Tales. He worked as script editor and writer on BBC One's BAFTA-award-winning The Armstrong & Miller Show (2007–2010), where he created the licentious Brabbins and Fyffe, parodying Flanders and Swann, accident-prone historian Dennis Lincoln Park, disapproving lingerie saleswomen Lisa and Yvonne and the 'Kill Them' sketches, among others. He was the script editor of BBC Two sitcom Grandma's House (2010), BBC Three's Dead Boss (2012) and Walking and Talking (2012) for Sky Atlantic. In 2010 his short story "The Bear" – a story about identity – was read as part of the Twenty Minutes strand on BBC Radio 3.

Due to Dyson's self-confessed lack of acting skills, he does not appear in The League of Gentlemen television series or any of its offshoots, apart from very brief cameos. He worked as the assistant producer instead. In the film adaptation he is played by Michael Sheen, although Dyson appears in the background of a few scenes.

Dyson has an interest in the supernatural fiction of English writer Robert Aickman and has adapted Aickman's work in a number of media. With Andy Nyman, he co-wrote and co-directed the supernatural-themed stage production Ghost Stories. The play broke box office records at the Liverpool Playhouse and Lyric Hammersmith theatres, where it had its first run between February and April 2010. It transferred to the Duke of York's Theatre in the West End in June 2010, where it ran for thirteen months. In January 2011, he returned to the Lyric Hammersmith with Roald Dahl's Twisted Tales, the first stage adaptation of Roald Dahl's short stories Tales of the Unexpected. A film adaptation of Ghost Stories, directed by Dyson and Nyman, and starring Nyman, premiered in 2017.

Dyson was script editor on the BBC Two comedy-thriller The Wrong Mans written by James Corden, Mathew Baynton and Tom Basden. The show is about a pair of lowly office workers who become unwittingly embroiled in a deadly criminal conspiracy. Its first series was broadcast in 2013. He has written and acted as script supervisor for the BBC sketch comedy series Tracey Ullman's Show and Tracey Breaks the News starring Tracey Ullman.

Alongside his writing work, Dyson plays keyboards in a pop band called Rudolf Rocker, and has previously been a member of Leeds band, Flowers for Agatha in the 1980s.

In September 2025, BBC Radio 4 premiered Dyson's original comedy drama High Cockalorum, set in West Yorkshire in 1978 and inspired by a true story. The drama, which featured Mark Gatiss, Reece Shearsmith, Steve Pemberton and Monica Dolan, celebrated Bradford City of Culture and as part of the BBC's "Contains Strong Language Festival".

Following Ghost Stories, Dyson and Nyman co-wrote and co-directed a new psychological horror play The Psychic which opened at the York Theatre Royal in April 2026.
