= Phase 4 Films =

Canadian film distribution company

Phase 4 Films, Inc.
- Type: Subsidiary
- Industry: Film; Animation
- Predecessor: Peace Arch Entertainment; Telegenic
- Founded: 1996; 30 years ago
- Founder: Berry Meyerowitz
- Defunct: 2015; 11 years ago
- Fate: Folded into Entertainment One
- Headquarters: Toronto, Ontario, Canada
- Area served: North America
- Key people: Berry Meyerowitz (president & CEO)
- Services: Film distribution; Home video; Digital distribution
- Owner: KaBoom! Kids KaBoom! DVD
- Parent: Entertainment One (2014–2015)
- Subsidiaries: KaBoom! Entertainment Inc.

Phase 4 Films was a Canadian independent film distribution company headquartered in Toronto. It had two branches in the U.S.: Los Angeles, California and Fort Mill, South Carolina. Its subsidiary, Kaboom! Entertainment markets children's entertainment with companies such as Corus Entertainment.

== History ==
Phase 4 Films traces its history to Telegenic, a family-oriented film distributor that was founded in 1996. Berry Meyerowitz purchased Telegenic in 2000 and renamed it as "Kaboom! Entertainment". In 2006, Peace Arch Entertainment Group, which later merged with ContentFilm, purchased Kaboom!. Berry Meyerowitz founded Phase 4 Films in April 2009 when he bought back their North American distribution business.

In 2011, Phase 4 announced a new Canadian television venture along with Take 5 Development. In 2012, they partnered with Kevin Smith's SModcast Pictures to distribute those films in the U.S. and Canada. Phase 4 acquired ESI Distribution in 2014 and signed distribution deals with The Criterion Collection and Shout! Factory. On June 2, 2014, Phase 4 Films itself was acquired by Entertainment One.

== Trademark infringement lawsuit ==
In 2013, Phase 4 acquired the rights to the Canadian animated feature The Legend of Sarila for distribution in the U.S. Instead of releasing it as the creators intended, Phase 4 adjusted the title to Frozen Land, then focused its marketing around text and disc art like that of Disney's Frozen, in addition to trailers and promotions casting it as resembling Frozen, though the film's story actually drew its inspiration early 20th century Inuit culture and had no resemblance to Frozen whatsover. In late December 2013, Disney filed a trademark infringement lawsuit against Phase 4 in California federal court, seeking an injunction against the continued distribution of Frozen Land in the U.S. Disney alleged that less than three weeks prior to the release of its animated feature film Frozen, Phase 4 Films Theatrically released The Legend of Sarila, which garnered "minimal box office revenues and received no significant attention."

To trade off the success of Disney's animated film and "[t]o enhance the commercial success of Sarila, the defendant redesigned the artwork, packaging, logo, and other promotional materials for its newly (and intentionally misleadingly) retitled film to mimic those used by [Disney] for Frozen and related merchandise." While film titles cannot be trademarked by law, Disney cited a number of alleged similarities between the new Phase 4's Frozen Land logo and Disney's original one.

By late January 2014, the two companies had settled the case; the settlement stated that the distribution and promotion of The Legend of Sarila and related merchandise must use its original title and Phase 4 must not use trademarks, logos or other designs confusingly similar to Disney's animated release. Phase 4 was also required to pay Disney $100,000 until January 27, 2014, and make "all practicable efforts" to remove copies of Frozen Land from stores and online distributors until March 3, 2014.

== Filmography ==
Year	Movie	US	Canada
2015	American Milkshake	DVD	
2015	Darkroom	DVD	
2015	Miss Meadows	DVD	
2015	Glass Chin	Theatrical	N/A
2015	Not Human	N/A	DVD
2015	10 Cent Pistol	N/A	
2015	The Rainbow Kid	N/A	
2015	Walter	DVD	
2014	Alien Uprising	DVD and Blu-Ray	
2014	Ask Me Anything	All media	
2014	The Boxcar Children	N/A	
2014	Butcher Boys	DVD	
2014	Devil's Mile	N/A	
2014	Take Care	N/A	
2014	Some Girl(s)	DVD	
2014	Legacy of Rage	N/A	DVD
2014	A Country Christmas	DVD	
2014	A Merry Friggin' Christmas	All media	
2014	Hit by Lightning	All media	
2014	Saturday Morning Massacre	N/A	DVD
2014	Switchmas	DVD	
2014	Brazilian Western	N/A	DVD and Blu-Ray
2014	Fort Bliss	N/A	DVD
2014	Black Rock	N/A	DVD
2014	Patrick		DVD
2014	Prisoners of the Sun	DVD	DVD
2014	Palo Alto	All media	DVD
2014	A Night in Old Mexico	Theatrical	N/A
2014	Come Morning	Video-on-Demand	
2014	Goodbye World	Video-on-Demand	
2014	Jamesy Boy	All media	
2014	The Day of the Siege: September Eleven 1683	DVD	
2014	The Wedding Pact	DVD	N/A
2014	After the Dark	All media	
2014	Agent F.O.X.	All media	
2014	Free Ride	Theatrical	N/A
2014	The Culture High	All media	
2014	Bucksville	All media	
2013	Otto the Rhino	All media	
2013	Apartment 1303 3D	All media	
2013	Miss Dial	All media	
2013	Crave	All media	
2013	Bold Eagles	All media	
2013	The Jungle Book: Return 2 The Jungle	All media	
2013	The Jungle Book	All media	
2013	The Short Game	All media	
2013	Adventures in the Sin Bin	All media	
2013	Compulsion	All media	
2013	I Declare War	N/A	All media
2013	Crazy Kind of Love	N/A	All media
2013	The Crash Reel	All media	All media
2013	Generation Um...	All media	
2013	Hemorrhage	Video-on-Demand	
2013	The Dirties	DVD	iTunes and Website
2013	Drones	Theatrical	
2013	The Black Dahlia Haunting	Video-on-Demand	All media
2013	Assault on Wall Street	Direct-to-DVD	
2013	Eden	Theatrical	N/A
2013	Dark Tourist	Theatrical	N/A
2013	An Easter Bunny Puppy	DVD	N/A
2013	A Talking Cat!?!	DVD	N/A
2013	Caroline and Jackie	All media	
2012	A Christmas Puppy	DVD	N/A
2012	Bad Kids Go to Hell	All media	
2012	Creature		
2012	Extracted	All media	All media
2012	Backwards	N/A	All media
2012	My Awkward Sexual Adventure	N/A	All media
2012	Heathens and Thieves	All media	All media
2012	Little Red Wagon	Theatrical	DVD
2012	Alter Egos	N/A	
2012	Sassy Pants	N/A	
2012	Scary or Die	Video-on-Demand	N/A
2012	Sushi Girl	Theatrical	All media
2012	Parasitic	N/A	DVD
2012	Smitty	DVD and TV	
2012	See Girl Run	N/A	TV
2012	Dracula Reborn	DVD and Video-on-Demand	
2012	Wonder Women! The Untold Story of American Superheroines	N/A	
2012	Electrick Children	Theatrical	Theatrical
2012	That's What She Said	N/A	Theatrical
2012	Barrio Tales	All media	N/A
2012	Hick	All media	N/A
2012	Tetherball	All media	N/A
2012	A Good Funeral	All media	N/A
2012	Bindlestiffs	N/A	Theatrical
2012	House Hunting	DVD	N/A
2012	A Little Bit of Faith	All media	N/A
2012	Ivan the Incredible	All media	N/A
2011	The Voyages of Young Doctor Dolittle	All media	N/A
2011	In the Name of the King: Two Worlds	N/A	DVD and Blu-Ray
2011	Chick Magnet	All media	All media
2011	Blubberella	N/A	All media
2011	Horrid Henry: The Movie	N/A	All media
2011	Flesh Wounds	All media	All media
2011	Hopelessly in June	N/A	All media
2011	Mayor Cupcake	All media	All media
2011	Lucky	Theatrical	N/A
2011	Rid of Me	N/A	Theatrical
2011	The Legend of Hell's Gate: An American Conspiracy	All media	N/A
2011	Knockout	Theatrical	N/A
2011	Absentia	DVD	N/A
2011	InSight		N/A
2011	Another Happy Day	Theatrical	N/A
2011	Red State	N/A	All media
2011	Budz House	DVD	
2011	Guilty Hearts	DVD	N/A
2011	Doggie B	Theatrical	N/A
2011	Kiss the Bride	All media	
2011	Open Gate	All media	N/A
2011	Contract Killers	N/A	DVD
2011	Kill Katie Malone	All media	N/A
2011	Sweet Karma	N/A	DVD
2011	Dear Lemon Lima	Theatrical	N/A
2011	Stories USA	All media	DVD
2011	Lost Colony: The Legend of Roanoke	All media	N/A
2011	The Wild Soccer Bunch 2	All media	N/A
2011	Grizzly Park	All media	N/A
2011	Freddy Frogface	All media	All media
2010	Looking for Jackie	All media	N/A
2010	God Send Me a Man	All media	N/A
2010	Veronika Decides to Die	Video	N/A
2010	The Tomb	DVD	N/A
2010	Crush	All media	N/A
2010	Deadland	DVD	N/A
2010	Kikkerdril	DVD	N/A
2010	Ultimate Heist	DVD	N/A
2010	Finding Bliss	Theatrical	N/A
2010	The Killing Room	N/A	DVD
2010	Bloodrayne: The Third Reich	All media	
2010	Caged Animal	DVD	N/A
2010	Terror Trap	All media	All media
2010	Hanna's Gold	All media	N/A
2010	Love & Distrust	All media	
2010	Supreme Champion	All media	
2010	Nic & Tristan Go Mega Dega	All media	
2010	Road Kill	DVD	N/A
2010	The Dead Undead	All media	N/A
2010	Enemies Among Us	All media	All media
2010	The Babysitters	DVD and Blu-Ray	
2010	My Babysitter’s a Vampire: The Movie	N/A	DVD
2010	Harm's Way	DVD	N/A
2010	Vidal Sassoon: The Movie	All media	N/A
2010	The Final Storm	DVD	N/A
2010	What Would Jesus Do?	All media	
2010	Good Intentions	Video	N/A
2010	Freestyle	Theatrical	N/A
2010	Order of Chaos	DVD	N/A
2010	Let God Be the Judge	All media	N/A
2010	Machete Joe	All media	All media
2010	The Freebie	Theatrical	N/A
2010	Drones	All media	All media
2010	American Maniacs	Video	N/A
2010	Gnomes and Trolls: The Forest Trial	All media	
2010	Journey to Promethea	All media	
2010	Nexus	All media	
2010	Perfect Life	Video	N/A
2010	Scar	All media	
2010	Wushu Warrior	All media	
2010	Cornered!	N/A	DVD
2010	Attack on Darfur	Theatrical and DVD	N/A
2010	Race	DVD	
2010	Don't You Forget About Me	DVD	
2010	Dead Man Running	All media	All media
2010	Brotherhood	All media	DVD
2010	Hugh Hefner: Playboy, Activist and Rebel	All media	DVD
2010	Forget Me Not	All media	All media
2010	The Nutcrackers	All media	N/A
2010	Rampage	DVD	
2010	Outrage: Born in Terror	Theatrical	N/A
2010	I Do & I Don't	DVD	N/A
2010	Bob and Margaret	DVD	N/A
2010	Among Dead Men	All media	All media
2010	Adventures of Power	All media	N/A
2009	The No Sit List	All media	N/A
2009	Luke and Lucy: The Texas Rangers	All media	All media
2009	Police Patrol	All media	
2009	Poker Run	All media	N/A
2009	Booky's Crush	All media	All media
2009	Adopted	All media	All media
2009	All American Orgy	All media	All media
2009	Red Hook	All media	All media
2009	Fifty Dead Men Walking	All media	N/A
2009	Midnight Movie	N/A	DVD
2009	Rigged	DVD	N/A
2009	Baby Blues	DVD	N/A
2009	Fling	DVD	DVD
2009	JCVD	N/A	DVD
2009	Paraiso Travel	Theatrical	DVD
2009	Rock the Paint	N/A	DVD
2009	Familiar Strangers	DVD	
2008	Disco Worms	DVD	
2008	Exit Speed	DVD	
2008	A Christmas Proposal	DVD	
2008	Christmas Town	DVD	
2008	At Jesus' Side	DVD	
2008	The Coverup	DVD	
2008	Goat Story	DVD	
2008	The Missing Lynx	Theatrical	N/A
2008	XIII: The Conspiracy	N/A	N/A
2008	The Poker House	All media	
2008	House of Fallen	All media	
2008	Garrison	All media	
2008	Guns	All media	
2008	Sticks and Stones	All media	
2007	Booky & the Secret Santa	All media	N/A
2007	Where Is Winky's Horse?	All media	
2007	Hack!	DVD	N/A
2007	Ten Inch Hero	All media	
2007	My Friend Bernard	All media	
2007	The Big Slice	DVD	N/A
2006	A Crime	DVD	N/A
2006	Guilty Hearts	All media	
2005	Buckaroo: The Movie	All media	
2005	Wheelmen	All media	
2003	The Wild Soccer Bunch	All media	
2001	The Last Brickmaker in America	All media	
