= David Bateson =

English actor (born 1960)

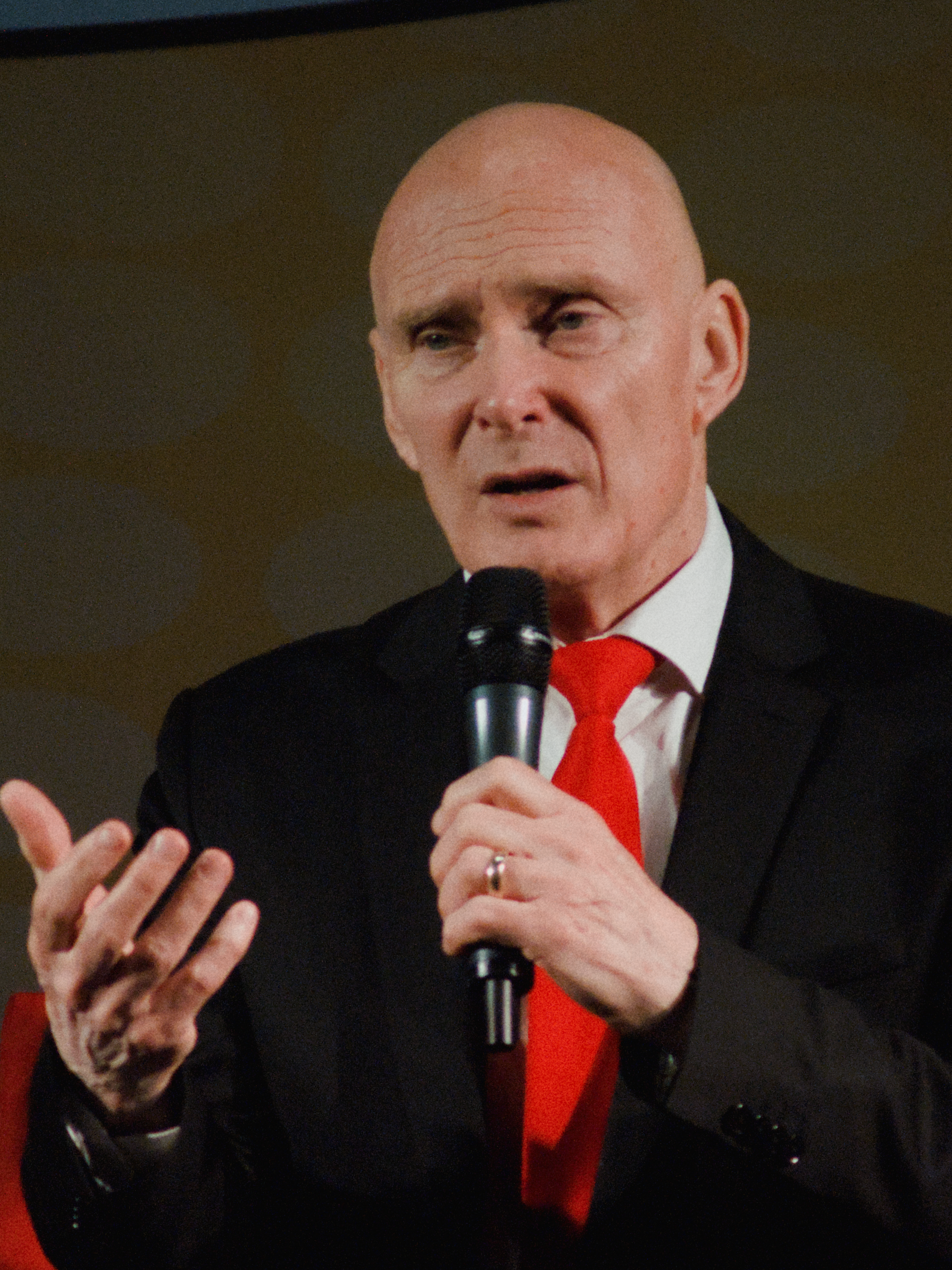
- Bateson in 2026
- Born: 9 February 1960 (age 66); Durban, South Africa
- Occupation: Actor
- Years active: 1994–present

David Bateson (born 9 February 1960) is a South African-born British actor who holds both British and Danish citizenship. He is best known for providing the voice of Agent 47, the protagonist of IO Interactive's stealth game series Hitman, having played the role since 2000 in each of the franchise's eight main games.

== Early life ==
David Bateson was born in Durban on 9 February 1960 to his English parents. He has said that the family moved between South Africa and England at least 13 times and that he attended nine schools overall, which "made [him] a little confused as to [his] identity for a while".

== Career ==
Bateson landed his first role when he played Hother in the 1994 film Prince of Jutland. He also played the part of a young sailor in the 1996 film Breaking the Waves, along with the main role in the 2002 short film Debutanten. He also acted alongside Mads Mikkelsen in the 1999 short film Tom Merritt, and would again act with Mikkelsen in a 2025 update for Hitman: World of Assassination.

Bateson's most notable role is that of Agent 47, the protagonist of IO Interactive's stealth game series Hitman. He has provided the voice and motion capture for the character in every entry in the series since 2000. Bateson landed the role after doing voiceover for another project in the same building that housed IO Interactive's studio for Hitman: Codename 47. Despite bearing an uncanny resemblance, he has refuted the popular belief that Agent 47's physical appearance was based on him, dismissing it as a coincidence. Addressing fan backlash following the revelation that he had been replaced without warning by American actor William Mapother for Hitman: Absolution, Bateson revealed that IO Interactive were ignoring his efforts to contact them and later confirmed on his website that he had been "unceremoniously dropped from the franchise" but was unable to comment further for "legal reasons". He was rehired for the voice role before the game's release, though Mapother's motion capture work remained intact. Despite the major setback, Bateson said in June 2025 that Absolution is his favorite game in the Hitman series. Mapother returned for the subsequent game to voice Dino Bosco, an arrogant Italian actor Agent 47 must kill.

Bateson voiced Virgil in the 2020 indie game Lightmatter, his first non-Hitman video game voice role. He voiced Bowser in the Danish dub of the 2023 film The Super Mario Bros. Movie, dubbing Jack Black's voice. He has also worked extensively in Danish television series and narrated various Lego commercials.

== Personal life ==
Bateson previously lived in England and South Africa; he is now a long-time resident of Denmark, where he is based in Copenhagen, holds Danish citizenship, and speaks fluent Danish. He is a member of both the British and Danish actors' unions.

== Filmography ==
=== Film ===
Year	Title	Role	Notes
1994	Prince of Jutland	Hother	
1996	Breaking the Waves	Young Sailor	
1999	Tom Merritt	Tom Merritt	Short film
2000	Help! I'm a Fish	Commander Shark, General Crab	Voice
2002	One Hell of a Christmas	Tommy	
2003	Stealing Rembrandt	Stor Mand	
2008	Sunshine Barry and the Disco Worms	Jimmy, Manager, Nature Speaker	Voice
2009	Headhunter	Dr. Leipmann	
2011	Freddy Frogface	Bardini, Blacksmith, Carlo Androkles, Ole Antonioni	Voice
2012	Ivan the Incredible	Butcher, Teacher, Grumpy Fisherman	Voice
2023	The Super Mario Bros. Movie	Bowser	Voice, Danish dub
2026	The Super Mario Galaxy Movie	Bowser	Voice, Danish dub

=== Video games ===
Year	Title	Role	Notes
2000	Hitman: Codename 47	Agent 47	
2002	Hitman 2: Silent Assassin	Agent 47, Agent 17	
2004	Hitman: Contracts	Agent 47	
2006	Hitman: Blood Money	Agent 47	
2012	Hitman: Absolution	Agent 47	
2016	Hitman	Agent 47	
2018	Hitman 2	Agent 47	
2020	Lightmatter	Virgil	
2021	Hitman 3	Agent 47	

=== Television ===
- Den Enes Død (1994)
- Carl Th. Dreyer: My Métier (1995) (documentary)
- Kun en Pige (1995) – Korrespondent
- Krystalbarnet (1996)
- Spoon River (1996)
- Another You (1997)
- Midnight Angels (1998)
- Daddyfox (2000) – Court Police Officer 2
- Debutanten (2002) (short) – Bill
- Langt fra Las Vegas (2001 – 2003) – Irer
- A Royal Family (TV, 2003) – Narrator (English version)
- The Core (2005) (documentary) – Niels Bohr
- Hero of God (2006)
- Anna Pihl (TV, 1 episode, 2008) – Mr.Reed
- Klovn (TV, 1 episode, 2008) – Dave
- Disco Ormene (2008) – Voice
- Maj & Charlie (TV, 1 episode, 2008) – Fitness Chef
- Aurum (2008) – Mark Boland
- Livvagterne (TV, 5 episodes, 2010) – Shane
- The Dark Side of Chocolate (2010) (documentary) – Narrator
- Borgen (TV, 2 episodes, 2010 – 2011) – Additional voices
- The Micro Debt (2011) (documentary) – Narrator
- The Life and Death of Thomas Simeon (2011) – Narrator (voice)
- A Tribute to J. J. Abrams (2013) (short) – Voice of Bouncer
- Taming the Quantum World (2013) (documentary) – Narrator
- Aftenshowet (TV, 2 episodes, 2013 – 2014) – Himself
- Exodus: Humanity Has A Price (2014) – Commander
- Monte Carlo Elsker USA (2014) – Speaker
- Upstart (2014)
- Huldra: Lady of the Forest (2016) – Mike
- Digital Romance (2016) (short) – Kane
- Bitter Grapes (2016) (documentary) – Narrator
- Ø (TV, 5 episodes, 2016) – Tommy
- Real Life Hitman (2016) (short) – Agent 47 (voice)
- Level up Norge (TV, 1 episode, 2017) – Agent 47 (voice)
- The Messenger (short, 2018) – Narrator / Boss
- Below the Surface (TV, 1 episode, 2019) – British newsreader (voice)
- Breeder (2020) – Speaker
- Kamikaze (TV, 1 episode, 2021) – Bengt
- A Taste of Hunger (2021) – Michelin Announcer
- The Orchestra (TV, 3 episodes, 2022) – Mablewood
- The Exigency II: Course of Action (TBA) – Hideout Guard (voice)
- The Somerdahl Murders (TV, 2 episodes, 2023) – Eric Windfeldt
