= The Politician's Husband =

2013 BBC television series

- Written by: Paula Milne
- Directed by: Simon Cellan Jones
- Starring: David Tennant; Emily Watson; Ed Stoppard; Lucy Hutchinson; Roger Allam
- Composer: Adrian Johnston
- Country of origin: United Kingdom
- Original language: English
- No. of series: 1
- No. of episodes: 3

Production
- Executive producers: David Aukin; Paula Milne
- Producer: Hal Vogel
- Running time: 57 minutes
- Production company: Daybreak Pictures

Original release
- Network: BBC Two
- Release: 25 April – 9 May 2013

Related
- The Politician's Wife

The Politician's Husband is a three-episode British television drama, first shown on BBC Two between 25 April and 9 May 2013. Written by Paula Milne, it makes a pair with her 1995 drama The Politician's Wife.

== Plot ==
Senior Cabinet minister Aiden Hoynes and his wife Freya Gardner are a high-flying golden political couple. Hoynes resigns from his post as part of a planned leadership bid, which is thwarted when his friend, the equally ambitious Bruce Babbish, condemns Aiden's resignation and inflammatory resignation speech. Babbish is aided by Chief Whip Marcus Brock, who plans to help the former in his own leadership bid. Freya, who had to temporarily stall her career to look after her and Aiden's two children, Noah and Ruby, replaces Aiden in Cabinet. Away from Westminster, husband and wife face an uncertain future as they come to terms with the diagnosis that Noah has Asperger syndrome.

Desperate to salvage his political career, Aiden convinces Freya to bide her time until an opportune moment in which she can pledge support to her husband's position, thus undermining the current Prime Minister. However, soon afterward, on a television interview, Freya is asked point-blank if she supports her husband's reasons for resigning, and she reluctantly says she does not. Aiden initially reacts with rage but later reasons that it was the only answer his wife could give if she hoped to save her job. The two seem to make up, but then Aiden rapes Freya later that night. Aiden leaves the room crying and later apologises to his wife for his actions.

Aiden and Freya slowly attempt to mend their relationship. Undermining their efforts are the necessity that Freya work closely with Bruce due to the close linkage of their departments (Work and Pensions, and Welfare and Employment, respectively), leading Aiden to become paranoid that his wife and Bruce will have an affair. The couple's au pair Dita attempts to seduce Aiden, is rebuffed, then later quits and tells numerous tabloids she and Aiden were having an affair. Freya stands by her husband, believing his claims of innocence. Aiden, however, has become convinced that Freya is now sleeping with Bruce, though unknown to him Freya has already rejected Bruce's attempts at seducing her. Aiden's father Joe stays with the family to fill in for Dita.

Aiden arranges a meeting with Bruce, telling him that he wants to repair their relationship for Freya’s sake. He presents Bruce with a groundbreaking proposal to address the urgent need for elderly care by offering incentives to qualified immigrants, managed by a local start-up firm. Bruce agrees to the proposal and prepares to present it, holding a meeting with the management company. While Bruce is occupied, Aiden delivers a speech in the House of Commons condemning the current government as lacking in ethics—a statement that makes headlines. The following day, Bruce is forced to resign after it is revealed that the firm representatives he met were actually undercover journalists, tipped off by Aiden, and that they possess video footage of him soliciting and accepting bribes.

Bruce confronts Aiden and Freya, accusing them of having conspired against him. Freya doesn't believe the accusation but later finds a draft of the plan in Aiden's home office. She accuses him of being unable to cope with no longer being "on top" in the relationship and confronts him over how his deception nearly ended her own career. Then, she becomes mortified when she realises that was his intent. Aiden accuses Freya of sleeping with Bruce and claims his scheme was meant to restore things to the way they originally were, before realising that this means the end of their marriage.

That night, Aiden's father berates him for what he has done. The next morning, the couple's daughter, Ruby, finds Aiden's father dead in the back yard, having died walking back from Aiden's office. After the funeral, Freya makes arrangements for Aiden to move out.

Six months later, Aiden has seemingly been elected Prime Minister, with Freya as his Deputy Prime Minister. They only remain married for political purposes. They share a brief private moment before their first cabinet meeting, staring at each other emotionlessly. As the cabinet files in, a brief exchange with Marcus Brock reveals that it is Freya, not Aiden, who has been elected Prime Minister.

== Cast ==
=== Main cast ===
- David Tennant as Aiden Hoynes, Secretary of State for Business, Innovation and Skills
- Emily Watson as Freya Gardner, Minister of State for Transport, Secretary of State for Work and Pensions, and later Prime Minister of the United Kingdom.
- Oscar Kennedy as Noah Hoynes, Aiden and Freya's son
- Lucy Hutchinson as Ruby Hoynes, Aiden and Freya's daughter
- Ed Stoppard as Bruce Babbish, Secretary of State for Work and Pensions then Secretary of State for Business, Innovation and Skills
- Roger Allam as Marcus Brock, Chief Whip of the House of Commons

=== Guest/supporting cast ===
- Jack Shepherd as Joe Hoynes, Aiden's father and Professor of Politics at the London School of Economics
- Chipo Chung as Lian Hooper
- Simon Chandler as Cliff Lyman, Chair of the Business, Innovation and Skills Committee
- Malcolm Scates as Kenny Moss
- Anamaria Marinca as Dita Kowalski, the Hoynes' au pair
- Luke Neal as Drew Bailey

Writer Paula Milne has stated that characters' surnames were drawn from the American political drama, The West Wing.
