= The Harrowing (Inside No. 9) =

- Inside No. 9 episode
- Episode no.: Series 1 Episode 6
- Directed by: David Kerr
- Written by: Steve Pemberton; Reece Shearsmith
- Original air date: 12 March 2014
- Running time: 30 minutes

Guest appearances
- Aimee-Ffion Edwards as Katy; Helen McCrory as Tabitha; Poppy Rush as Shell; Sean Buckley as Andras

Episode chronology
← Previous "The Understudy"	Next → "La Couchette"

"The Harrowing" is the sixth and final episode of the first series of British dark comedy anthology series Inside No. 9. It aired on 12 March 2014 on BBC Two. The episode was written by Steve Pemberton and Reece Shearsmith, and stars Shearsmith, Aimee-Ffion Edwards, Helen McCrory, Poppy Rush and Sean Buckley. While comedic in places, "The Harrowing" makes extensive use of gothic horror elements transmuted into a modern context. The plot follows Katy (Edwards), who has been hired to housesit for eccentric siblings Hector (Shearsmith) and Tabitha (McCrory). They rarely leave the house, but have an event to attend. They tell Katy about their bedridden, disabled brother Andras (Buckley), who cannot speak but will ring a bell if he needs assistance. Katy is joined by her friend Shell (Rush) once Hector and Tabitha leave, and, upon hearing Andras's bell, the pair reluctantly head upstairs. The episode takes place in Hector and Tabitha's mansion, which is kept deliberately cold and filled with paintings depicting Hell. The writers experimented with a variety of possible endings, hoping to make the episode's close both interesting and scary.

Critics agreed that the episode was the most gothic and scary of the series, with journalists writing for The Sunday Times saying that "The Harrowing" would be best avoided by those of a nervous disposition. Critics writing in the Metro felt that the episode was a poor finale for the series, and that the episode's ending was unsatisfying. By contrast, Alex Hoskins, writing for the Cheddar Valley Gazette, felt the episode's ending was very strong, and Bruce Dessau described "The Harrowing" as an excellent end to the series. On an Empire online list, "The Harrowing", particularly its final scene, was selected as the 17th best TV moment of the year. The episode was watched by 833,000 people on its first showing, which was 4.7% of the audience.

== Production ==
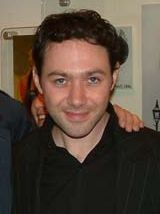
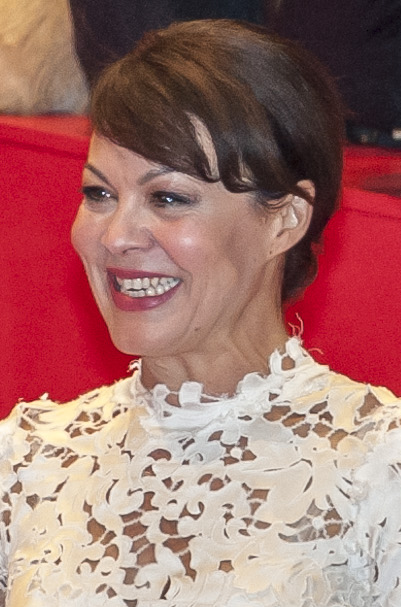
Shearsmith (left, pictured in 2003) and McCrory (right, pictured 2015) played siblings Hector and Tabitha

Writers Steve Pemberton and Reece Shearsmith, who had previously worked together on The League of Gentlemen and Psychoville, took inspiration for Inside No. 9 from "David and Maureen", episode 4 of the first series of Psychoville. This episode, in turn, was inspired by Alfred Hitchcock's Rope. "David and Maureen" took place entirely in a single room, and was filmed in only two shots. At the same time, the concept of Inside No. 9 was a "reaction" to Psychoville, with Shearsmith saying that "We'd been so involved with labyrinthine over-arcing, we thought it would be nice to do six different stories with a complete new house of people each week. That's appealing, because as a viewer you might not like this story, but you've got a different one next week." As an anthology series with horror themes, Inside No. 9 also pays homage to Tales of the Unexpected, The Twilight Zone and Alfred Hitchcock Presents.

As the format of Inside No. 9 requires new characters each week, the writers were able to attract actors who may have been unwilling to commit to an entire series. "The Harrowing" starred Aimee-Ffion Edwards as Katy, Helen McCrory as Tabitha, Shearsmith as Hector, Poppy Rush as Shell and Sean Buckley as Andras. "The Harrowing" was the only episode in the series in which Pemberton did not star; Shearsmith played a character in all but "Last Gasp". Comedy critic Bruce Dessau noted that Shearsmith's role was actually relatively minor, saying that the house was the real star.

Pemberton and Shearsmith are fans of classic horror films, and the episode displays inspiration from the likes of Alfred Hitchcock's filmography and the Hammer Horror films. Pemberton called the episode the "most genre" of the series, while Shearsmith described it as their attempt to produce a "full on ... gothic horror-esque" episode. The writers utilised the horror norm of a gothic mansion rather than bringing horror into a normal home. This route, Shearsmith suggested, has now become atypical. The setting allowed the writers to mix modern elements with traditional gothic horror, sometimes for comedic effect (a reference to "something called broadbands"), and sometimes to add to the horror (mobile phones cannot be used, as the characters are in a "dead zone"). While the writers did want the episode grounded in reality, they also wanted to make more use of gothic horror tropes than they had in other episodes of Inside No. 9. "The Harrowing" was advertised with a poster homage to classic horror films. The poster was designed by Graham Humphreys, a graphic designer known for his work on horror film posters. The episode's name was taken from the Harrowing of Hell, the story of Jesus Christ's descent to Hell in Christian theology.

The character Katy is initially hired to babysit, though it turns out that there is no baby. Previous horror films, including When a Stranger Calls, have made use of a babysitter as a plot device, and an urban legend involves a babysitter downstairs with a threat upstairs. Both the viewer and the babysitter learn about the environment together, with both beginning in a position of ignorance. For Pemberton, the device works because the character has been moved from a safe environment into the unknown. In "The Harrowing", he suggests, it is obvious that there is something in the bedroom. The writers experimented with different endings, in an attempt to make the bedroom's contents interesting and genuinely scary.

== Plot ==
External videos
- "I'm not a vampire" Katy meets Hector in the mansion's kitchen
- "Who lives here, The Munsters?"; Shell sees the inside of Hector and Tabitha's mansion

Katy Hepworth has been hired to take care of Hector and Tabitha's mansion while the two go out for the evening. They usually never leave the house, but have a rare event to attend. Tabitha greets Katy at the door and explains that the house is always kept at −3 °C as Hector and Tabitha's disabled brother, Andras, needs the air to be at this temperature. The paintings on the house's walls depict the Harrowing of Hell. After meeting Hector, Katy is disturbed by Tabitha's descriptions of Andras, who, it is claimed, does not have a mouth. He instead keeps a bell, which he never uses, beside his bed. Katy is told not to go upstairs.

Hector and Tabitha leave. Katy is spooked by the house, especially when she finds a stuffed cat on the sofa. She sees an old photograph of Hector, Tabitha and Andras as children, but Andras does not look disabled. Katy's friend Shell arrives and plays with Hector's stairlift, sending it upstairs. Katy warns Shell not to break anything, and is startled to see the now-live cat. Katy tries to call her father so she can leave, but the house has no mobile phone signal and the house phone's party line is tied up. As she prepares to leave, the stairlift returns downstairs and Andras's bell rings. Katy is scared of going upstairs, but, at Shell's insistence, the two go to check on him.

Katy and Shell explore and enter Hector's bedroom, where they find a circle of salt around the bed. They hear the bell again and trace the sound to Andras's room. When Katy opens the bed's curtains, Andras's deformed body is revealed; he is tied to the bed and gagged, wearing only a cloth nappy. Katy goes to untie him, believing that Hector and Tabitha have kept him prisoner. Shell asks how Andras could have rung the bell if his hands were tied. Hector and Tabitha appear and show that it is they who rang the bell. Hector sings some of "Lord of the Dance" with his guitar; Tabitha stops him. They quote Dante's Inferno and explain that Hell is cold, as the text says, so the house must be kept refrigerated for Andras. They say he was possessed at age ten by Castiel, demon of mischief, but Castiel needs a new human host every fifty years, and Andras is now dying. Katy was chosen as the next host after a mutual friend at Tabitha and Hector's church recommended her to them. It is revealed that Shell also attends the church, and she helped them to lure Katy. Shell implies that the church's members protect the earth from being overrun by demons.

Tabitha and Hector prepare to inject Katy with a sedative, informing her to remove her blazer and blouse, but she fights back. She runs downstairs only to find that the door is locked. Shell arrives and says that Katy cannot escape. Shell says she wanted to be Castiel's new human host, but she is too weak, whereas Katy has the strength of character needed to keep the demon contained. Shell injects Katy, who collapses. Upstairs, Katy is shown stripped to her underwear and is tied to a chair and gagged while Shell feeds Andras his "last supper": rusks and baby milk, the only food he can manage. Hector, Tabitha and Shell leave Katy alone to become acquainted with Castiel, who, they say, will possess her as Andras dies. Andras advances on Katy. As she screams through the gag and struggles, Andras advances and repeatedly cries: "Mischief!"

== Reception ==
Critics variously called "The Harrowing" the "nastiest", "most Gothic" and most horrorific episode of Inside No. 9. It was described as "unashamedly macabre" by Metro journalists, and "a genuine fright fest" by Dessau. Despite both reviews characterising "The Harrowing" as one of the weaker episodes of the series, it was called "very creepy" in the Liverpool Echo, and the closing scene was described as extremely scary in the Metro. Critics writing for The Sunday Times said that the episode "really is best avoided by those of a nervous disposition", and the sentiment was echoed in the Cheddar Valley Gazette, where it was suggested that the character of Andras "certainly warranted the warning of disturbing scenes" given before the episode.

Concerning the comedic elements of "The Harrowing", Sunday Times critics said that "comedy doesn't come blacker than this". Jack Seale, of the Radio Times, said that viewers would "marvel at how [the writers could] pepper the elegant script with gags without breaking the spell". Dessau also felt that the script was "great", and commented on a "particularly pithy" joke, "just when you least expect it". Nick Rutherford and Keith Watson, writing for the Metro, downplayed the comedy of the episode, saying that "the odd defiantly bad joke... pierced the darkness". They felt that "The Harrowing" was a weak instalment of Inside No. 9, giving it three out of five stars. The ending, these critics suggested, was "a bit of a cop out" rather than "daring". For them, unlike in other Inside No. 9 scripts, there was no twist. Alex Hoskins, writing for the Cheddar Valley Gazette, acknowledged that the "ending will most likely have sparked an online outcry", but felt that "it was fantastic, fearless and a perfect end to [the] series". Dessau shared a positive view, saying that the series ended "on an absolute high", with one of his favourite episodes.

=== Viewership and recognition ===
"The Harrowing" was watched by 833,000 people, which was 4.7% of the audience. This was a recovery from the series low of the previous week's "The Understudy", but was fewer viewers than any of the first four episodes. The average viewing figures for the series were 904,000 people, or 4.9% of the audience, lower than the slot average of 970,000 (5.1% of the audience).

Due in part to her appearance in the episode, Edwards was shortlisted for WalesOnline's "Daffta" award for best actress, but lost in the public vote to Eve Myles. For Hallowe'en 2014, ezine Den of Geek listed "31 scary TV episodes that truly terrified us". Phoebe-Jane Boyd selected "The Harrowing", commenting on its divergence from previous episodes of Inside No. 9 and the clash of humour and horror tropes. Describing the character of Andras, she explained that "Seeing him jerkily moving towards [Katy] with glee, hissing 'mischief'...' straight into camera, is shocking, unexpected, and above all, just horrible." "The Harrowing", particularly its final scene, was selected as Empire Online's 17th greatest television moment of 2014. "Though there are dark laughs in the episode", it was claimed on the website, "the ending is pure nightmare fodder, the babysitter helpless as a Castiel-possessed man advances, hissing, 'Mischief!' Steve Pemberton and Reece Shearsmith, we both salute you and request you contribute to our therapy bills".
