= Bruce Mackinnon =

English actor and writer

- Born: 17 October 1978 (age 47); Esher, Surrey, England
- Occupations: Actor; writer

Bruce Mackinnon (born 17 October 1978) is an English actor and writer who has appeared in various television programmes and films.

== Early life ==
Mackinnon was born in Esher, Surrey and was educated at Eton College, before studying drama at The University of Manchester.

== Career ==
Mackinnon began his career in the comedy duo "Mat and Mackinnon" with Mathew Horne. MacKinnon has starred in TV shows such as The Office, The Catherine Tate Show, Smack the Pony and for HBO Rome. Movie credits include Life and Death of Peter Sellers, The Duchess and Vanity Fair. He has also written for television shows such as The Catherine Tate Show, Alistair MacGowan, Johnny Vaughan and for Dara Ó Briain on Live Floor Show. In 2012, Mackinnon was selected to play Sir Andrew Aguecheek in the RSC's 2012 production of Twelfth Night, directed by David Farr. In 2014 Mackinnon has appeared in Inside No. 9 for the BBC, Utopia for Channel 4 and the Marvel Studios movie Guardians of the Galaxy.

In 2015 MacKinnon starred in Showtime / Hat Trick Productions Episodes. In 2022 he appeared as Isaac in Ghosts.

== Partial filmography ==
- The Office (2002, TV Series) - Jimmy the Perv
- Trevor's World of Sport (2003, TV Series) - Marcus
- My Hero (2003, TV Series)
- Absolute Power (2003, TV Series) - Line Up Reception
- The Life and Death of Peter Sellers (2004) - Reporter #1 - Britt at Hospital
- Vanity Fair (2004) - Casino Boy
- Fat Slags (2004) - Minion 1
- Agatha Christie's Marple (2004, TV Series) - Scamper
- The Catherine Tate Show (2004–2005, TV Series) - Tony, Man on Train
- Things to Do Before You're 30 (2005) - Colin
- Rome (2005, TV Series) - Priscus Maevius
- Home Again (2006, TV Series) - Mark
- Jekyll (2007, TV Mini-Series) - Malcolm
- The Duchess (2008) - Sir Peter Teazle
- Lewis (2008) - Conan Jones
- Taking the Flak (2009, TV Series) - Harry Chambers
- Big Top (2009, TV Series) - Boyco
- M.I. High (2010) - The Octopus
- Freddy Frogface (2011) - (voice)
- Tad, The Lost Explorer (2012) - The Mummy (voice)
- All at Sea (2013, TV Series) - Mr. Atkinson
- United Passions (2014) - Louis Muhlinghaus
- Guardians of the Galaxy (2014) - Vorker, One-Eyed Ravager
- Inside No. 9: "The Understudy" (2014) - Malcolm (voice)
- The Bad Education Movie (2015) - Grant Dodd (Security Guard)
- Lovesick (2016, TV Series) - Hotel Manager
- The Mercy (2018) - Barman
- Bohemian Rhapsody (2018) - Reporter 2
- Kill Ben Lyk (2018) - Banker Ben Lyk
- Final Fantasy XIV: Shadowbringers (2019, Video Game) - Chai-Nuzz / Tolshs Aath (voice)
- Silky Hotel (2021, TV short) - Jonathan Sosidge
- The Loud House (2025) - King of England, Earl of Nuttingham (voices, in "Europe Road Trip: A Knight to Remember")
