= Prince of Jutland =

1994 film by Gabriel Axel

- Promotional poster for the film under the title Royal Deceit
- Directed by: Gabriel Axel
- Written by: Gabriel Axel; Erik Kjersgaard
- Produced by: Kees Kasander
- Starring: Christian Bale; Gabriel Byrne; Helen Mirren; Kate Beckinsale; Brian Cox
- Cinematography: Henning Bendtsen
- Edited by: Jean-François Naudon
- Music by: Per Nørgård
- Production companies: Les Films Ariane; Woodline Films Ltd. Kenneth Madsen Filmproduktion A/S; Canal+ Films Roses
- Distributed by: Constantin Film
- Release date: 19 August 1994
- Running time: 109 minutes
- Countries: France; United Kingdom; Denmark; Germany; Netherlands
- Languages: English; Danish

Prince of Jutland, also known as Royal Deceit and Thrones & Empires, is a 1994 drama adventure film co-written and directed by Gabriel Axel and starring Christian Bale, Gabriel Byrne, Helen Mirren, and Kate Beckinsale. It is an adaptation of the Danish legend of prince Amleth, drawing upon the 12th-century works of Saxo Grammaticus, which was also the inspiration for Shakespeare's Hamlet.

The film featured the debut film performances of David Bateson and Andy Serkis.

== Plot ==
Prince Amled witnesses the murders of his father, King Hardvendel of the Danes, and Amled's brother. The perpetrators are Fenge (the king's brother) and his henchmen. This trauma seems to drive Amled instantly insane, and he enters a semi-catatonic state. His inability to bear witness saves him from being killed as well. The king and prince's bodies are brought back to Amled's distraught mother, Geruth, at their castle.

Fenge tells Geruth that he arrived on the scene after her husband and son were murdered, and he doesn't know who is responsible. She believes his story and leans on him for support. Fenge is crowned king and announces that Geruth is his queen. During the burning of the funeral pyres, Amled observes that fire "destroys even a great king."

Amled continues to act erratically, but Fenge wonders if the prince is truly insane or simply pretending. His men take Amled into the woods and leave him with a maiden named Gunvor. Amled and Gunvor have sex, after which she confesses that Fenge sent her to seduce Amled, but she promises not to reveal that he is sane. They continue their relationship in secret.

While most men are away from the castle on business, Amled kills Fenge’s right-hand man, Ribold. He then reveals to Geruth that he has been sane all along, and tells her that Fenge is the murderer of their loved ones. She promises to never sleep with Fenge again and asks Amled to kill his uncle and take the crown.

The henchman Frovin finds Ribold's bloody tunic in a pig trough, and Fenge discovers Gunvor is pregnant with Amled's child. Now sure that the prince is sane, Fenge announces that he is sending Amled to visit Duke Aethelwine in the Kingdom of Lindsey on the isle of Great Britain. As Gunvor watches Amled's ship sail away, Fenge's henchman Ragnar murders her.

On the voyage, Amled finds a message that Fenge has written to Aethelwine, asking Amled to be executed. He alters the message so that it seems Fenge wants two henchmen, Aslak and Torsten, to be killed. During Amled’s first night in Lindsey, the servants are hanged. Amled feigns shock and ignorance, so Aethelwine pays him a large amount of damages in gold.

The Kingdom of Lindsey is fighting a war and suffers defeat in battle. Amled leads the soldiers in guerilla warfare against the invading army, resulting in a surprise victory. He marries Aethelwine's daughter, Ethel, and sets sail for home.

On their journey, Amled and Ethel stay at the home of Bjorn, a trusted friend. Amled is informed that Fenge believes him to be dead. He returns to the castle and sends Geruth to Bjorn's home for safety. Amled ties up Fenge’s drunken men in tapestries and sets fire to the castle’s great hall. The prince then awakens Fenge, takes him to the hall, and kills him with a knife. Amled sits outside and watches the hall burn down.

His revenge complete, the common people gather to see Amled crowned king by Geruth, with Ethel by his side. The people applaud their new leaders.

== Cast ==
- Gabriel Byrne as Fenge
- Helen Mirren as Geruth
- Christian Bale as Amled, son of Hardvendel and Geruth
- Brian Cox as Aethelwine
- Steven Waddington as Ribold
- Kate Beckinsale as Ethel
- Tony Haygarth as Ragnar
- Freddie Jones as Bjorn
- Tom Wilkinson as Hardvendel, King of Danes
- Saskia Wickham as Gunvor
- David Bateson as Hother
- Andy Serkis as Torsten
- Mark Williams as Aslak
- Ewen Bremner as Frovin
- Philip Rham as Aelfred, son of Aethelwine
- Richard Dempsey as Sigurd

== Reception ==
Spectrum Culture: "Overall, Prince of Jutland is an unusual, refreshing, and slightly bleak film. The deliberate artistic and stylistic choices that make it work also, at times – such as with the slightly clumsy fight sequences – don’t pay off and leave the film feeling a little flat."

Variety: "Despite a sturdy English-speaking cast, and a director whose rep with the 1987 “Babette’s Feast” still carries arthouse echoes, pic is a deliberate deconstruction of the Shakespeare play, shorn of familiar elements...“Prince of Jutland’s” only concession to mainstream entertainment values is Per Norgaard’s bright score in the pic’s first half.

Time Out: "A major disappointment after the delightful Babette's Feast"

DoBlu: "Most of the budget must have been sunk into the cast’s paychecks, resulting in basic sets for the historical Jutland setting. Expect cable telefilm standards for sets and costumes."

Helen Mirren .net: "But the film’s major flaw is its best concern – it looks like the 12th century in all its blandness. There’s not much for the eye and the film doesn’t waste much on action either. Maybe that was a budget question, but a bit more cinematic feel would have improved the film."

== See also ==
- Germanic Heroic Age
- Late Antiquity
- List of historical period drama films
