= Paula Milne =

British screenwriter

Paula Milne is a British screenwriter. Her works include The Politician's Wife, The Virgin Queen, Chandler & Co, Die Kinder, Second Sight, Driving Ambition, Small Island and Endgame.

Her first single drama was A Sudden Wrench, after working on titles such as Coronation Street and Juliet Bravo.

She also devised the BBC medical drama Angels.

== Notable works ==
=== Television ===
- 1982: A Sudden Wrench (Play for Today episode)
- 1982: John David (Play for Today episode)
- 1976 - 1979: Coronation Street
- 1980: Juliet Bravo
- 1984: Driving Ambition
- 1990: Die Kinder
- 1994–1995: Chandler & Co
- 1995: The Politician's Wife (Channel 4)
- 1996: The Fragile Heart (Carnival/Channel 4)
- 2000-2001: Second Sight (TV serial)
- 2006: The Virgin Queen (TV serial)
- 2009: Small Island (BBC TV movie) (based on the novel of the same name by Andrea Levy)
- 2011: The Night Watch (BBC) (based on the novel of the same name by Sarah Waters)
- 2012: White Heat (ITVP/BBC)
- 2013: The Politician's Husband (BBC)
- 2016: HIM (ITV)
- 2017: The Same Sky (ZDF)

=== Film ===
- 1995: Mad Love (Touchstone Pictures)
- 1996: Hollow Reed (Scala/Channel 4 Films)
- 2000: I Dreamed of Africa (Paramount) (based on the novel of the same name by Kuki Gallmann)
- 2009: Endgame
