= Jo Stone-Fewings =

English actor

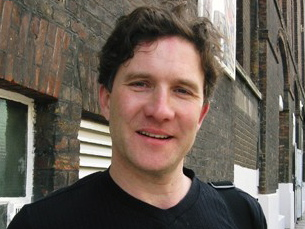
- Stone-Fewings at the Old Vic Theatre, 2009
- Born: Jonathan Stone-Fewings
- Education: Royal Welsh College of Music & Drama
- Occupation: Actor
- Years active: 1989–present
- Spouse: Nancy Carroll (m. 2003)
- Children: 2

Jonathan Stone-Fewings is an English actor. He studied at Hereford College of Arts and at the Welsh College of Music and Drama, and began his career in 1989. He has been a member of the Royal Shakespeare Company (RSC) since 1994. He first performed with the National Theatre playing Barrildo in Declan Donnellan's Fuenteovejuna at the Cottesloe Theatre.

In 2008 he took over the lead role of Richard Hannay in The 39 Steps at the Criterion in London's West End. He performed the role of Gerry in the revival of Brian Friel's Dancing at Lughnasa at the Old Vic in London and has recently performed the role of Orsino in Twelfth Night for the RSC.

In 2015 he was appointed a Fellow of Hereford College of Arts.

== Personal life ==
He has been married to actress Nancy Carroll since 2003. The couple have two children.

== Selected theatre credits ==
Year	Title	Role	Director	Notes
2015	King John	John	James Dacre	Royal & Derngate; Shakespeare's Globe
2014	Richard III	Buckingham	Jamie Lloyd	Trafalgar Studios
2014	The Big Meal	Sam/Robbie	Michael Boyd	Theatre Royal Bath
2012	The Way of the World	Mirabell	Rachel Kavanaugh	Chichester Festival Theatre, co-starring Penelope Keith
2011	A Midsummer Night's Dream	Theseus/Oberon		RSC
2011	The City Madam	Luke Frugal		RSC
2010	The Invisible Man		Ian Talbot	The Menier Chocolate Factory; London
2009	Twelfth Night	Orsino	Gregory Doran	RSC – the Courtyard Theatre; London transfer to the Duke of York Theatre in December
2009	Dancing at Lughnasa	Gerry	Anna Mackmin	The Old Vic
2008	The 39 Steps	Richard Hannay	Maria Aitken	The Criterion, West End
2007	The Country Wife	Sparkish	Jonathan Kent	Theatre Royal Haymarket, co-starring Toby Stephens as Horner
2007	Angels in America	Joe Pitt	Daniel Kramer	UK tour
2006	See How They Run	Lance Corporal Clive Winton	Douglas Hodge	Duchess Theatre, co-starring Digby and Nancy Carroll
2005	King Lear	Edgar	Steven Pimlott	Minerva Theatre Chichester, co-starring David Warner
2005	The Scarlet Letter	Arthur Dimsdale	Phyllis Nagy	Minerva Theatre Chichester, co-starring Elizabeth McGovern
2004	The Astonished Heart / Still Life	Dr. Christian Faber/ Dr. Alec Harvey	Phillip Wilson	Liverpool Playhouse double bill, co-starring Nancy Carroll
2004	Unthinkable	Oliver Soper	Josie Rourke	Crucible Theatre, Sheffield
2003	CrazyBlackMothafuckin'self	Raef	Josie Rourke	Royal Court Jerwood Theatre Upstairs
2002	The Shadow of a Boy	Shadow	Erica Whyman	NT Loft
2002	King John	Phillip The Bastard	Gregory Doran	RSC – Swan Theatre
2001	Twelfth Night	Orsino	Lindsay Posner	RSC
2000	The Taming of the Shrew	Lucentio	Lindsay Posner	RSC
1999	Richard III	Duke of Buckingham	Elijah Moshinsky	RSC – Royal Shakespeare Theatre, Savoy Theatre
1998	Cymbeline	Guiderius	Adrian Noble	RSC – Royal Shakespeare Theatre, Barbican, New York City and Washington, D.C.
1997	The Merry Wives of Windsor	Fenton	Ian Judge	RSC – Royal Shakespeare Theatre, Barbican
1996	Henry VIII	Earl of Surrey	Gregory Doran	RSC – Swan Theatre, Young Vic, New York City and Washington, D.C.
1996	The Misanthrope	Julian	Lindsay Posner	Young Vic
1996	War and Peace	Nikolai Rostov	Polly Teale	NT Cottesloe
1994	The Park	The Son	David Fielding	RSC – The Pit, Barbican 1995
1994	Henry VI, Part 3	George, Duke of Clarence	Katie Mitchell	RSC
1993	The Importance of Being Earnest	John Worthing	James Maxwell	Manchester Royal Exchange
1992	One Over The Eight	Oliver	Alan Ayckbourn	Stephen Joseph Theatre, Scarborough
1989	Ghetto	Alex	Nicholas Hytner	NT Olivier

=== Reviews and articles ===
- "Jo Stone-Fewings On ... Stepping into a Global Hit" by Kate Jackson, whatsonstage.com (16 June 2008)
- "The Big Interview", Official London Theatre Guide (11 June 2008)
- "The 39 Steps Celebrates", Official London Theatre Guide (14 May 2008)
- "Photo Flash; Stone-Fewings Joins 39 Steps", Broadway World (24 April 2008)
- "Stone-Fewings Steps into New Role", Official London Theatre Guide] (18 March 2008)
- "The Country Wife" by Michael Coveney, whatsonstage.com (10 October 2007)
- "Angels In America" by Michael Coveney, whatsonstage.com (27 June 2007)
- "See How They Run" by Michael Coveney, whatsonstage.com (30 June 2006)
- "Twelfth Night" by Maxwell Cooter, whatsonstage.com (4 January 2002)
- "The Taming of the Shrew" by Maxwell Cooter, whatsonstage.com (8 November 1999)
- "Cymbeline" by Birna Helgadóttir, whatsonstage.com (26 March 1998)

== Television and film ==
Year	Title	Role	Director	Notes
2024	White Bird	Jean Paul Beaumier	Marc Forster	Film
2018	Trust	Dennis		5 episodes
2017	The Crown	Collins		
2017	Silent Witness	Chris Tresize	David Richards	Episode: "Remembrance"
2016	Father Brown	Nero Hound	Paul Gibson	Episode 4.5 "The Daughter of Autolycus"
2014	Inside No. 9	Macduff (voice)	David Kerr	Episode: "The Understudy"
2009	New Tricks, Series 6, Episode 8	Tom Eldridge		1 episode, "Meat Is Murder"
2009	Misfits	Jeremy	Tom Green	Episode 1 & 2
2005	Doctor Who	Davitch Pavale	Joe Ahearne	2 episodes: "Bad Wolf" and "The Parting of the Ways"
2004	Midsomer Murders	Danny Pinchel	Peter Smith	ITV 1 episode, "A Tale of Two Hamlets"
2004	Unstoppable	Agent Gabriel	David Carson	Film with Wesley Snipes, American accent
2003	Seven Wonders of the Industrial World	William Jacomb	Christopher Spencer	BBC 1 episode "The Great Ship", narrated by Robert Lindsay
2003	Wondrous Oblivion	Mr. Pugh	Paul Morrison	Award-winning comedy/drama
2003	The Bill	Sean Skinner	Peter Butler	2 episodes
2003	In Search of Shakespeare	Player	Gregory Doran	BBC, Produced by Michael Wood
2003	Mine All Mine	Danny Baveystock	Sheree Folkson	ITV
2002	Young Arthur	Jack	Mikael Solomon	American production
2000	Best of Both Worlds	Martin Sullivan	David Richards	BBC
1999	All The King's Men	Lt. Alec Beck	Julian Jarrold	BBC, award-winning TV film with Maggie Smith and David Jason
1999	Peak Practice	Jeff Loudon	Ken Hannam	ITV, 1 episode, "Not Waving But Drowning"
1992–1993	Medics	Dr. Toby Maitland Evans	Jean Stewart	11 episodes
1992	Moon And Son	Ian	Robert Tronson	1 episode "Past, Present and Future"
1991	Waiting for God	Bob	Michael Aitkens	BBC 1 episode "Young People"
1991	Casualty	Mark Sutton	Charles McDougall	BBC 1 episode "Dangerous Games"
1991	Soldier Soldier	Lt. Richard Gardner	Laurence Moody	4 episodes
1991	American Friends	Undergraduate King Lear	Tristam Powell	Co-starring Alfred Molina and produced by Michael Palin
