= Lucy Hutchinson (actress) =

British former child actress (born 2003)

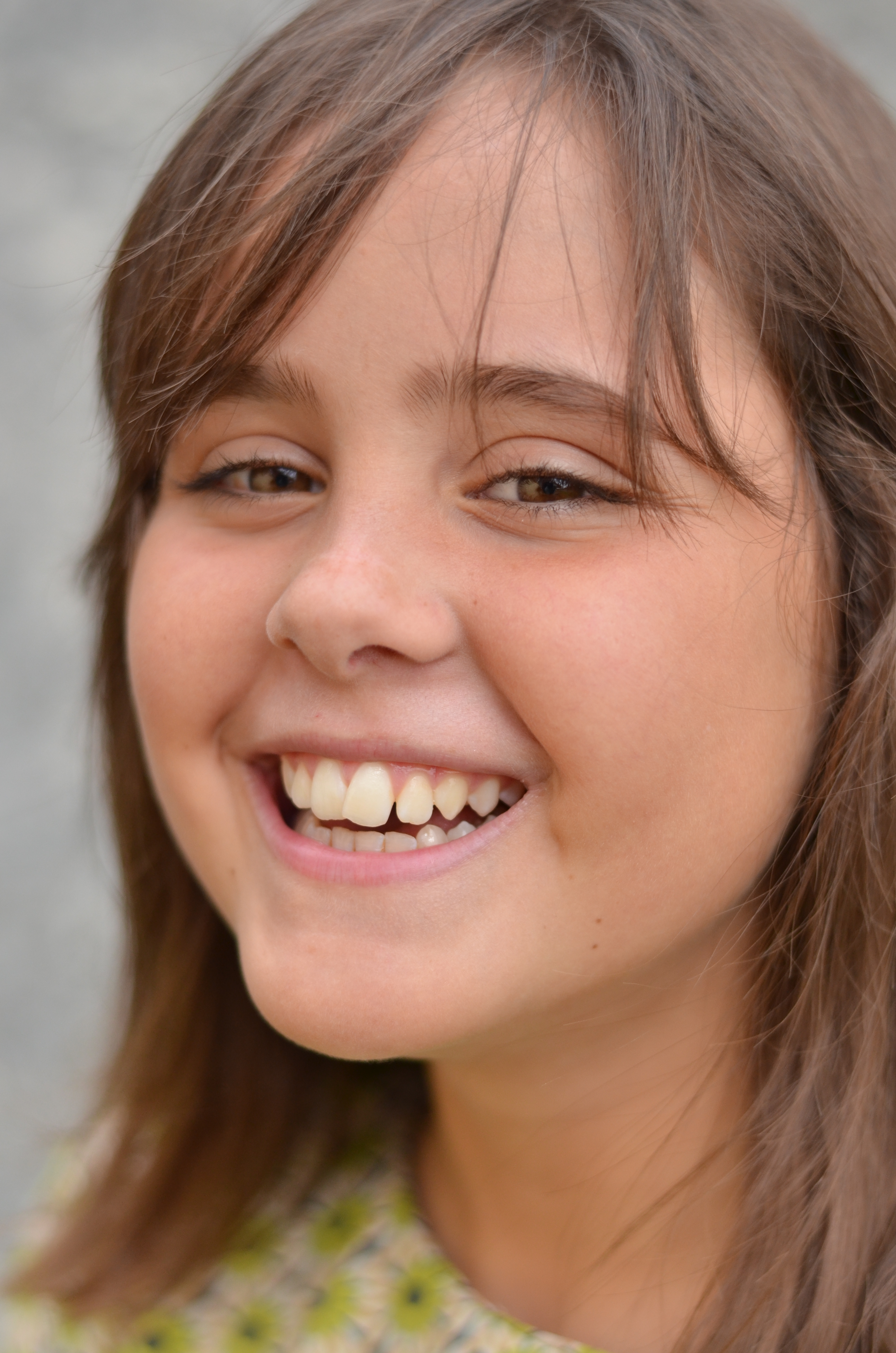
- Hutchinson, August 2015
- Born: Lucy Rose Hutchinson; 18 July 2003 (age 23); Lewisham, London, England
- Occupation: Actress
- Years active: 2008–2016

Lucy Rose Hutchinson (born 18 July 2003) is a British former child actress, best known for playing young Elizabeth Shaw in Ridley Scott's Prometheus.

== Biography ==
Hutchinson's first acting experience came in the 2008 film Dustbin Baby, based on Jacqueline Wilson's 2001 novel of the same name. In Dustbin Baby, she played the younger version of the lead character April, seen in flashbacks. Hutchinson was five at the time of filming, and was described by director Juliet May as "one of the most remarkable five year olds I have ever met", saying that "it's like she's not acting at all". Prior to her appearance in Dustbin Baby, Hutchinson had attended a local drama group for children, and was signed up with an agency. Her father said that she got the role because "she was the right face in the right place ... She was incredibly lucky but that doesn't deter from how well she did in getting it."

After the release of Dustbin Baby, Hutchinson played roles in British television programmes EastEnders, Doc Martin and Psychoville. Her film debut came when she filmed scenes for the American film Prometheus, in which she played a younger version of the main character, Elizabeth Shaw. Hutchinson said "It was really good and I think the experience was great for me as well. It was filming at Pinewood, it is such a big place and that showed me what other sets were being built there which was good. I have never really been to a big set before, I just thought 'wow'. I know it was a big scene, Ridley Scott told me it was a really big scene. I was quite confident and just thought 'yeah I am going to do this'."

Hutchinson subsequently made appearances on radio, stage and television, including roles in Little Crackers, The Politician's Husband, Not Going Out and Inside No. 9. She had main roles in CBBC's Dani's Castle and the BBC sitcom The Kennedys. Hutchinson also performed at the Royal National Theatre in a production of Emil and the Detectives from 11 November until 20 March, featuring other later-successful child actors Seb Sargent and Louis Partridge, a rehearsal for which was attended by Queen Elizabeth II and The Duke of Edinburgh.

As of 2012, then-eight-year-old Hutchinson attended school in Croydon, where she lived with her parents, Gary and Anna, and older brother.

== Filmography ==
=== Film and television ===
Year	Title	Role	Notes	References
2008	Dustbin Baby	Young April Johnson	TV film	
2009	EastEnders	Stacey Slater's imaginary daughter	3 episodes	
2011	Psychoville	Chloe Groves	3 episodes	
2011	Doc Martin	Ella	Episode: "Don't Let Go"	
2012	Prometheus	Young Elizabeth Shaw	Feature film	
2012	The Poison Tree	Young Biba	TV film	
2012	Little Crackers	Young Rebecca Front	Episode: "Rebecca Front's Little Cracker: Rainy Days & Mondays"	
2013	The Politician's Husband	Ruby Hoynes	3 episodes	
2013	Not Going Out	Nancy	Episode: "Magic"	
2014	Terry and Brenda	Kelly	Short film	
2014	Inside No. 9	Tamsin	Episode: "Last Gasp"	
2015	Mr. Bean	Little Girl	Comic Relief special sketch: "Funeral"	
2015	Dani's Castle	Leonie	Main role	
2015	The Kennedys	Emma	Main role	
2016	Casualty	Chloe	1 episode "The Best Day of My Life"	

=== Stage ===
Year	Title	Role	Notes	References
2013	To Kill a Mockingbird – Play	Scout	Play won the 2014 Samuel French Best Play Revival WhatsOnStage Award	
2013–2014	Emil and The Detectives – Play	Pony		

=== Radio ===
Year	Title	Role	Notes	References
2014–present	Home Front	Jessie Moore	Longlisted for 2015 Best Actor or Actress in a Debut Role BBC Audio Drama Award	
2014	Dangerous Visions	Anna	Radio 4 drama; episode "The Illustrated Man"	
2015	Earthsea	Serret	Radio 4 adaptation of Earthsea; episode 1, "Shadow"	
2015	All Those Women	Emily	Radio 4 drama; main role	
