= The Politician's Wife =

British television series

- Written by: Paula Milne
- Directed by: Graham Theakston
- Starring: Juliet Stevenson; Trevor Eve; Ian Bannen; Anton Lesser; Frederick Treves; Minnie Driver
- Composer: Barrington Pheloung
- Country of origin: United Kingdom
- Original language: English
- No. of series: 1
- No. of episodes: 3

Production
- Production location: England
- Cinematography: Tom McDougal
- Editor: Alan Jones
- Running time: 185 minutes

Original release
- Network: Channel 4
- Release: 16 May – 30 May 1995

Related
- The Politician's Husband

The Politician's Wife is a British television political drama broadcast on Channel 4 between 16 and 30 May 1995, written by Paula Milne, and starring Trevor Eve and Juliet Stevenson. Milne returned to the same themes in her BBC Two drama miniseries, The Politician's Husband (2013).

== Plot ==
Duncan Matlock (Trevor Eve) is a high-flying politician and Families Minister for the British government, who becomes embroiled in a tabloid scandal as it is discovered that he has been having a 10-month affair with a former escort turned parliamentary researcher (Minnie Driver). Duncan's wife, Flora (Juliet Stevenson), becomes the focus of media attention as her reactions to the revelations are played out. Initially she plays the part of the loyal wife, but as an aide of her husband's, Mark Hollister (Anton Lesser), feeds her details about the affair and various other political scandals that could be made to happen, she begins to sabotage her husband's integrity and reputation through a campaign of leaks and misinformation to the press and Conservative Party stalwarts. After a series of increasingly sensational and damaging stories in the press, her husband is forced to resign in humiliation. The last episode closes with the results of the by-election being announced on TV. Flora Matlock wins with the support of her party, whilst her husband is exiled to a minor post in Belgium.

== Cast and characters ==
- Juliet Stevenson as Flora Matlock, Duncan's loyal wife and mother to his children, Paul and Joanna. After the revelation of his affair, Flora begins to plan her revenge.
- Trevor Eve as Duncan Matlock, Tory MP, Minister for the Family and Flora's husband.
- Ian Bannen as Sir Donald Frazier
- Anton Lesser as Mark Hollister, Ministerial Advisor to Duncan Matlock, who hides his sexuality for fear of stereotypical comments from Duncan.
- Frederick Treves as Clive Woodley, Flora's father. He hides the true facts of Duncan's affair from his daughter, but not to spare the emotional impact, only to ensure Flora's relationship with Duncan continues to benefit his political career.
- Minnie Driver as Jennifer Caird, a Parliament Researcher, who has a degree and used to be an escort, who has an affair with Duncan Matlock.
- Veronica Clifford as Veronica Weston, a member of the Conservative Christian Wives Association
- Diana Fairfax as Rosalind Clegg, Vice Chairman of the Carlingham Conservative Association

== Reception ==
The show won Best Serial Drama at the 1996 British Academy Film Awards, and Best International Drama at the 1995 Emmy Awards. It received a positive review in the New York Times, which praised Stevenson and Eve's performances.

== Home media ==
The Politician's Wife was released on DVD by Acorn Media UK in August 2011.

== The Politician's Husband ==
A companion series by Milne, The Politician's Husband, is a three-episode British television miniseries, first shown on BBC Two between 25 April and 9 May 2013.
