= Jelly T =

2012 Danish animated film

- Film poster
- Danish: Gummi T
- Directed by: Michael Hegner
- Screenplay by: Michael W. Horsten
- Produced by: Nina Crone; Erik Wilstrup
- Edited by: Hendrik Bech
- Music by: Halfdan E. Søren Siegumfeldt
- Production company: Crone Film
- Distributed by: Svensk Filmindustri
- Release date: 16 May 2012
- Running time: 80 minutes
- Country: Denmark
- Language: Danish

Jelly T (Danish: Gummi T), also released as Ivan the Incredible, is a 2012 Danish 3D computer-animated superhero comedy film directed by Michael Hegner from a screenplay by Michael W. Horsten, based on the 1975 children's book Gummi-Tarzan by Ole Lund Kirkegaard. It is the second film in a trilogy of computer-animated films based on children's books by Kirkegaard, following Freddy Frogface (2011) and preceding Otto the Rhino (2013). Jelly T was released in Danish theatres on 16 May 2012. While being positively received in Denmark, critical response in the United States was mostly negative.

== Premise ==
Ivan Olsen is constantly bullied at school, mostly by his father who is angry at his inabilities of being both smart and strong enough to protect himself. Lotte, a cute girl wishes to be a friend of his but Ivan unwillingly disagrees believing he can't do anything at all. That evening, Ivan visits a witch who makes a potion which grants Ivan the ability to be the best at everything for 24 hours, which allows him to teach his bullies a valuable lesson. Sadly, that doesn't even impress Lotte during their race with the butcher's daughter, due to the fact that Ivan has actually posed a risk to her life so far and sent the butcher's daughter flying over the town, with Lotte claiming to have loved the normal wimpy Ivan (despite the fact that Ivan's father has told him he could find love if he'll be capable of everything). Lotte is now not willing to see Ivan, nor talk to him. However, things change back to normal and Ivan becomes his normal self again, so Lotte can come back to him eventually.

== Voice cast ==
- Thure Lindhardt as Ivan "Jelly Tarzan" Olsen
- Nicolaj Kopernikus as Ivan's father
- Karen-Lise Mynster as the witch
- Birthe Neumann as Mrs Sørensen
- Signe Egholm Olsen as Lotte
- Jens Andersen as Karsten
- Bjarne Henriksen as the butcher
- Esben Pretzmann as the inspector
- Cecilie Stenspil as Kim
- David Bateson as the teacher and angry fisherman

== Release ==
Jelly T was released in Danish cinemas on 16 May 2012.

=== Title change ===
The film was originally intended to be released as Gummi-Tarzan (English: Rubber Tarzan), as is the name of the book upon which the film is based. However, when Walt Disney Pictures released their animated film Tarzan in 1999 they secured the exclusive rights to the title. After publishers of Ole Lund Kierkegaard's book were threatened with legal action, they reached an agreement with Disney that the original book may be freely republished as Gummi-Tarzan, but that in all other media the title must be Gummi T (English: Rubber T). Crone Film decided to follow this agreement to avoid possible legal action.
