= Freddy Frogface =

2011 film

- Film poster
- Directed by: Peter Dodd
- Written by: Søren Danielsen; Peter Dodd
- Produced by: Nina Crone; Erik Wilstrup; Eric Foo; Mingda Lee; Joy Wong; Shawn Wang
- Starring: Nikolaj Lie Kaas; Thure Lindhardt
- Cinematography: Per Risager
- Edited by: Erick Leos; Per Risager
- Music by: Halfdan E Søren Siegumfeldt
- Production companies: Crone Film A/S; Wil Film; Xing Xing Digital Corporation
- Distributed by: SF Studios
- Release date: 1 June 2011
- Running time: 84 minutes
- Countries: Denmark; China
- Language: Danish

Freddy Frogface (Danish: Orla Frøsnapper) is a 2011 Danish 3D animated comedy film directed by Peter Dodd, and based on the book Orla Frøsnapper by Ole Lund Kirkegaard. It was later dubbed into English and was released in several other countries. It is the first film in a trilogy of computer-animated films based on children's books by Kirkegaard, before Jelly T (2012) and Otto the Rhino (2013).

== Plot ==
The story follows Victor, a 10-year-old boy who lives in a small sleepy town, where he and his dog Sausage spend the summer pulling pranks on adults. He usually hangs out with his best friend Jacob and his cousin, Claire, who recently moved into town. Despite this, he constantly gets picked on and beaten up by Freddy, the town bully, who is considered the meanest kid in town. After an altercation, Victor ends up embarrassing Freddy in public after he puts a frog in his mouth, which ends up giving Freddy the nickname "Freddy Frogface". Around the same time, the circus comes to town, and Victor tries his best to train Sausage for a big act he's planning for. Unknown to him however, Freddy secretly follows him and tries to steal his act.

== Original Danish Cast ==
- Nikolaj Lie Kaas as Orla Frøsnapper / Tryllekunster / Klovn
- Thure Lindhardt as Victor
- Nicolaj Kopernikus as Jakob / Lille Louis / Kontrollør / Fakir
- Katrine Falkenberg as Clara
- Margrethe Koytu as Fru Olsen
- Ole Thestrup as Smeden / Slagter Jørgensen
- David Bateson as Bardini
- Cecilie Stenspil as Fru Svensson / Fru Strong / Fru Sivertsen
- Lars Thiesgaard as Mister Strong
- Lasse Lunderskov as Kanonkongen / Hr. Svensson / Kanonmand
- Lars Ranthe as Linedanser

== English dub cast ==
- Freddy Frogface - Bruce Mackinnon
- Victor - Gregg Chillin
- Jacob / Mr. Svensson / Ming Bozelius - Jim North
- Clara / Little Louis - Katrine Falkenberg
- Mrs. Willough / Mrs. Svensson / Mrs. Strong / Mrs. Olsen - Tina Robinson
- Bardini / Cannonball King / Blacksmith - David Bateson
- Ole Antonioni / Carlo Androkles / Butcher Jonathan - Andrew Jeffers
- Mr. Strong / Circus Man / Grandpa - Ian Burns
- Boys - Jeremy Keil Byrn
- Girls - Olivia Keil Byrn
