= Last Gasp (Inside No. 9) =

- Inside No. 9 episode
- The poster for "Last Gasp", designed by Matt Owen
- Episode no.: Series 1 Episode 4
- Directed by: David Kerr
- Written by: Steve Pemberton; Reece Shearsmith
- Editing by: Joe Randall-Cutler
- Original air date: 26 February 2014
- Running time: 30 minutes

Guest appearances
- Sophie Thompson as Jan; Lucy Hutchinson as Tamsin; David Bedella as Frankie J Parsons; Tamsin Greig as Sally; Adam Deacon as Si

Episode chronology
| ← Previous "Tom & Gerri" | Next → "The Understudy" |

"Last Gasp" is the fourth episode of the first series of the British dark comedy anthology television programme Inside No. 9. It first aired on 26 February 2014 on BBC Two. The story revolves around the ninth birthday of the severely ill Tamsin (Lucy Hutchinson). Tamsin's parents Jan (Sophie Thompson) and Graham (Steve Pemberton) have arranged with the charity WishmakerUK for the singer Frankie J Parsons (David Bedella) to visit as a treat for their daughter. Frankie dies after blowing up a balloon, leading to arguments between Graham, the WishmakerUK representative Sally (Tamsin Greig), and Frankie's assistant Si (Adam Deacon) over the now-valuable balloon containing Frankie's last breath. The story, written by Pemberton and Reece Shearsmith, was inspired by someone Pemberton had seen on Swap Shop who collected air from different places.

"Last Gasp" is a morality tale that satirizes and critiques celebrity culture. Reviewers praised the episode for its humour and performances, while critics noted that it compares unfavourably to other episodes of Inside No. 9. In retrospect, Pemberton said that "people hated" the episode. On its first showing, "Last Gasp" drew 872,000 viewers, lower than any previous Inside No. 9 episode. After "Last Gasp" aired, Pemberton sold a balloon containing his own breath on eBay, with proceeds going to a Sport Relief charity.

== Production ==
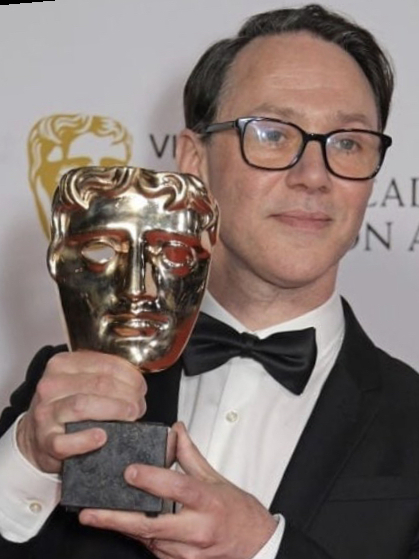
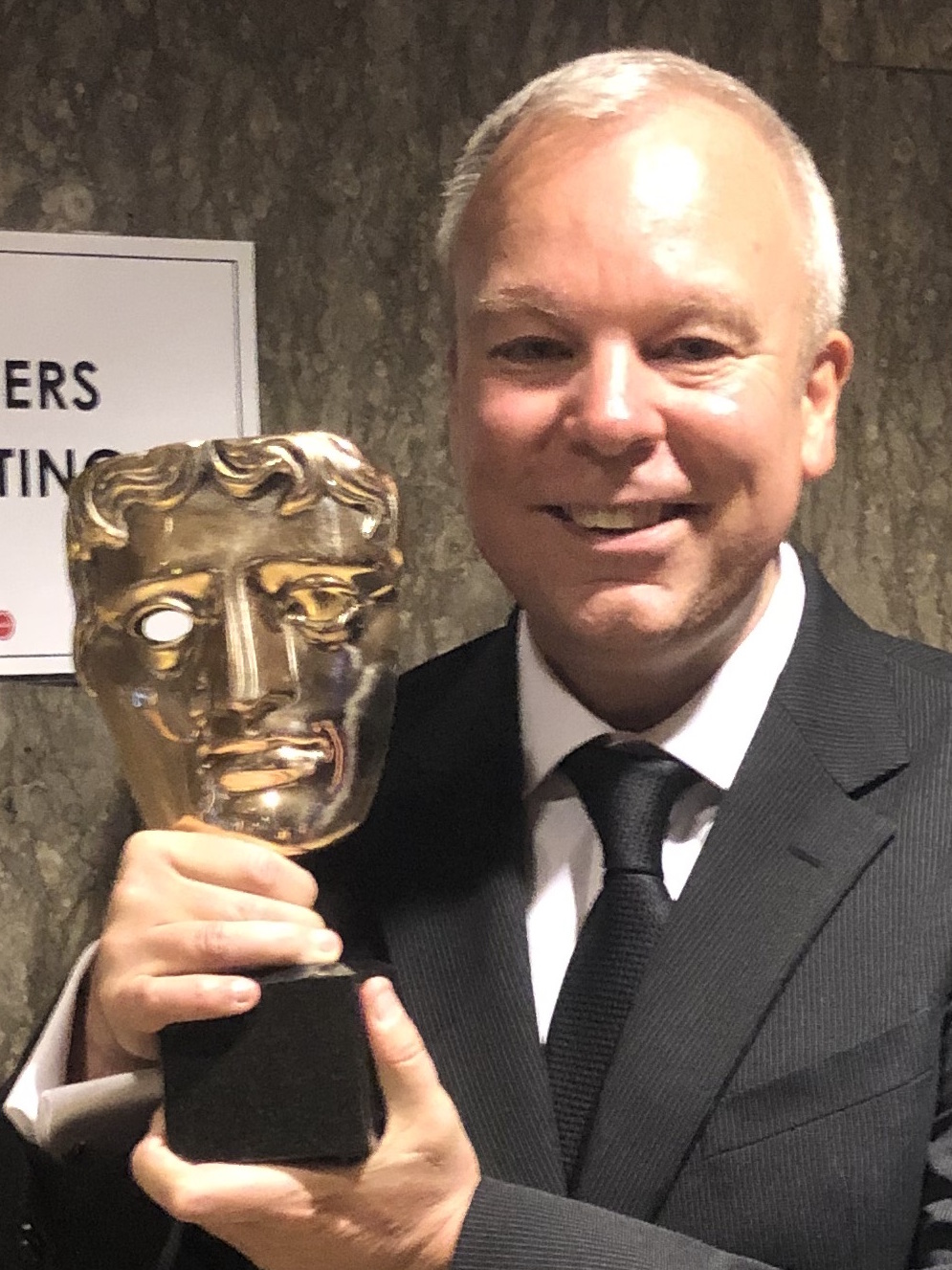
Reece Shearsmith (left, pictured in 2021) and Steve Pemberton (right, pictured in 2019), the writers of "Last Gasp"

"Last Gasp" was inspired by someone Pemberton had seen on the children's programme Multi-Coloured Swap Shop who collected apparently empty jars that actually contained air taken from different places. This "bizarre" idea had stayed with him, and inspired the idea of collecting the breath of celebrities. The death of Michael Jackson and the death of Amy Winehouse, along with the associated collecting of memorabilia, also served as inspiration. For Pemberton, the family and house in "Last Gasp" were deeply mundane. The episode was filmed on location in what the director David Kerr called an "utterly freezing" house. The episode, for Kerr, had a degree of "suburban darkness" in that, though the events unfold in an unremarkable setting, the darker side of human nature is revealed. At the same time, the characters' arguments lead to humour. Shearsmith described "Last Gasp" as like a My Family episode "gone wrong".

As the format of Inside No. 9 requires new characters each week, the writers were able to attract actors who might have been unwilling to commit to an entire series. In addition to Pemberton—who played Graham, the father—"Last Gasp" stars Sophie Thompson as Jan, the mother; Lucy Hutchinson as 9-year-old Tamsin; David Bedella as the pop star Frankie J Parsons; Tamsin Greig as Sally, of WishmakerUK; and Adam Deacon as Si, Parsons's assistant. Unusually for Inside No. 9, the episode does not feature Shearsmith in a credited acting role.

For Kerr, the typical difficulty associated with the use of child actors was not present in "Last Gasp"; for him, Hutchinson "was superb. She was brilliant; she had maturity beyond her years." Pemberton and Shearsmith hoped to use Inside No. 9 as a vehicle to work with new people, and had been keen to collaborate with Greig for some time. Kerr said that "one of the real joys of Inside No. 9" was the opportunity to see actors in very different roles to those in which they had previously starred, mentioning Greig and her role explicitly.

== Plot ==
External videos
- "Jan's home video" Jan struggles with a video camera, keen to record Tamsin's special day
- "Frankie Parsons is in our house!" Frankie Parsons arrives, much to Jan's excitement
- "What's the best dream you've ever made come true?" Sally talks to Jan about a little girl who wanted to be a postman

Graham and Jan struggle with a camcorder and blow up balloons. A charity called WishmakerUK has arranged for the pop star Frankie J Parsons to visit Tamsin, Graham and Jan's terminally ill daughter, for her ninth birthday. Frankie arrives, much to the excitement of Jan, accompanied by Si, his personal assistant, and Sally, a WishmakerUK representative. Frankie visits Tamsin in her bedroom, and blows up a purple balloon for her. He begins to struggle for breath and then collapses. Later, Graham makes tea for Jan and Sally. Jan is upset about Frankie's death. Si says that no one can touch anything or call an ambulance until Frankie's manager arrives. Tamsin, sitting in her wheelchair, holds the balloon; and Graham and Si realise that it may be valuable. Si takes the balloon from Tamsin, and Graham ties it. Sally takes a call from her boss, but does not mention Frankie's death. She makes excuses to have a colleague cover for her on her next assignment so that she can stay at the house. Graham and Si argue over the balloon, and Graham gives it to Sally, as he considers her "a neutral". He looks online to work out how much the balloon and accompanying footage may be worth.

Later, Jan starts playing one of Frankie's CDs, but Graham turns it off to talk about money with Si and Sally. Jan takes Tamsin outside. Tamsin worries that Frankie's death is her fault because she asked him to blow up the balloon. She asks if Frankie's soul will go to Heaven, and Jan says that it will. Inside, Si, Sally, and Graham argue about how to split the money they will make from the balloon. The argument becomes heated after Sally argues that the fact Tamsin will soon die should preclude her from getting a share. As Graham threatens to pop the balloon, Jan reappears and chastises him. Tamsin, who is now considered neutral, takes the balloon. Graham says they should all settle down and have lunch. In the kitchen, Sally and Jan talk about Sally's work, and, in Tamsin's bedroom, Graham and Si talk about Parsons, with Si revealing that Parsons was actually unpleasant to work for. There is a loud bang from outside, and everyone goes back into the lounge, fearing that the balloon has burst. Graham and Si take the balloon to an upstairs bedroom and tuck it into a bed, while Jan turns the music back on.

Everyone sits in silence, waiting for Parsons's manager to arrive. Jan suggests that Graham blow up another balloon for Tamsin. Sally, Si, and Graham realise that, with the camera footage they have, they can blow up all the purple balloons and sell them to multiple bidders. Jan screams when she sees movement in Tamsin's bedroom; Frankie is still alive. Jan takes Tamsin out of the room and the remaining three agree, after panicked discussion, that they should kill Frankie. Si loses a coin toss and smothers Frankie with a cushion. Later, out on the street, Frankie's body is put into an ambulance. Si says to Sally and Graham that he will be in touch and leaves. Sally and Graham discuss selling the camcorder footage, and Jan runs inside to see that Tamsin is not in her chair or room. Upstairs, Tamsin crawls onto the bed containing the balloon, carrying a heart-shaped helium balloon. On the street, Sally, Graham, and Jan see Tamsin opening the upstairs window. She releases the helium balloon with the balloon containing Frankie's breath attached. The two float skyward as Graham films.

== Themes and analysis ==
The world's sick, Jan! Someone paid five and a half grand for Scarlett Johansson's used tissue! It's like Billy said: 'We didn't start the fire' ...

— Graham responds to Jan's claim that his plan is "sick".

"Last Gasp" is a morality tale that unsubtly satirizes and critiques celebrity and fandom. Rebecca McQuillan, writing in The Herald, felt the episode captures the "sheer unctuousness" of fandom. She added that, as the plot advances, the venal and vulgar attitudes that are initially hidden behind the characters' fake grins are revealed. For her, the story takes place around Tamsin, who looks "worldly and disappointed with the human race". David Chater, of The Times, identified celebrity worship and greed as the episode's themes. The comedy critic Bruce Dessau noted that the episode had "a flicker" of "The Pardoner's Tale", from Chaucer's Canterbury Tales.

In the South African newspaper The Star, the episode was identified as the most cynical of the first series. For the reviewer, it "parades before us the depravity to which the human animal will stoop, and explores how agendas can be furthered under the noble cover of altruism". David Upton, writing for PopMatters, called it "easily the most acerbic and most overtly comic" episode of the series. He listed three reasons that the episode does not seem like something produced by Pemberton and Shearsmith: its avoidance of the horrific; the fact that it does not star Shearsmith; and its direct focus on celebrity culture, which Upton considers a modern phenomenon. Instead, he suggested that it feels closer to a story from Charlie Brooker's anthology programme Black Mirror. The focus of "Last Gasp" on comedy to the exclusion of horror, for Upton, leaves it "stranded" when compared to the other episodes.

Paddy Shennan, writing for the Liverpool Echo, questioned the extent to which the ending would actually impact the characters, asking whether they could have nonetheless sold the fake balloons. For the freelance journalist Dan Owen, the premise "riff[s] on the fact [that] online auction sites like eBay often sell ludicrous items for huge amounts of money". Owen argued that the episode's plot offers an amusing way that such a sale could come about. Though not fraudulent, the sale would nonetheless be "highly disrespectful and money-grabbing".

== Reception ==
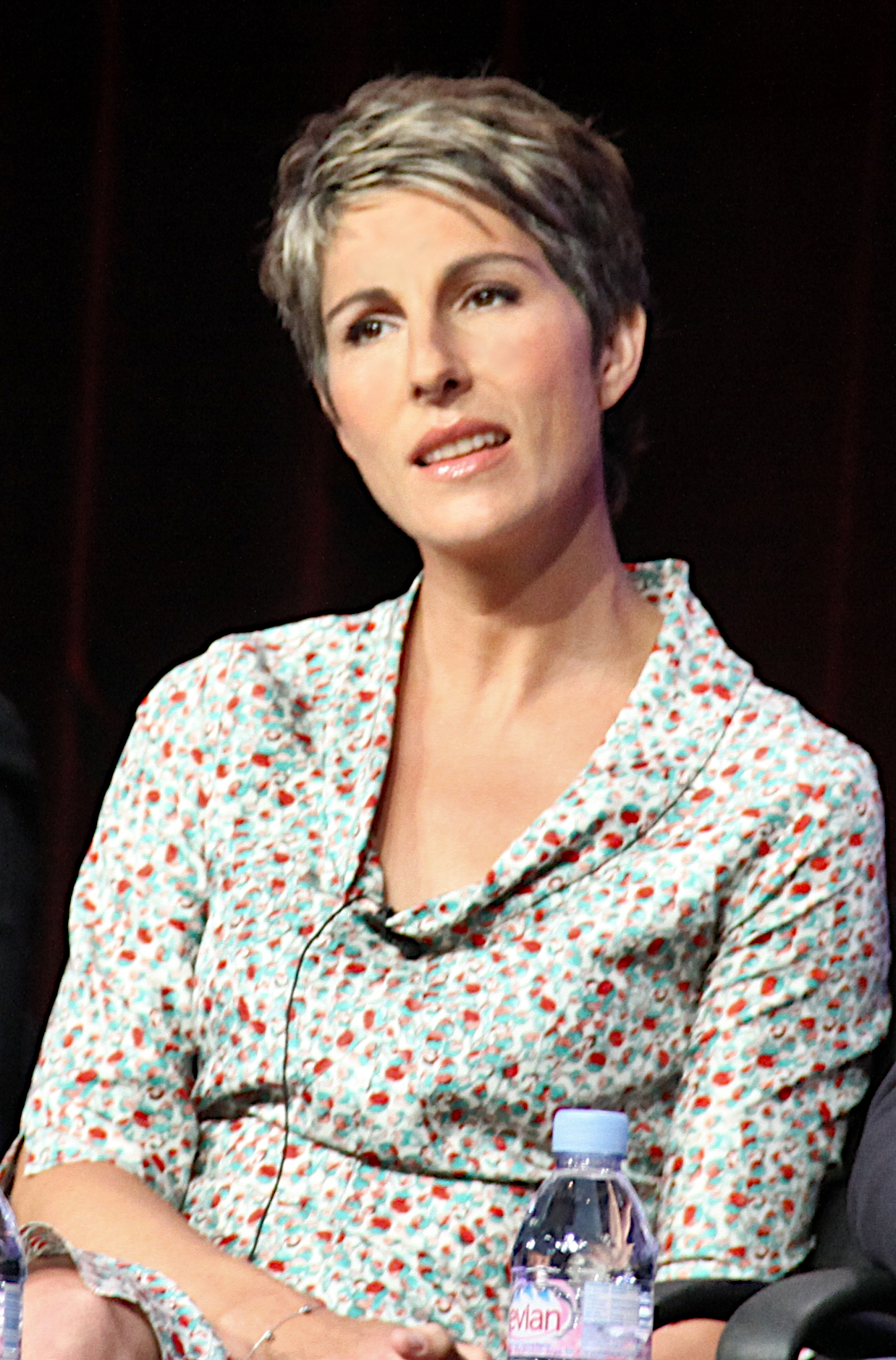
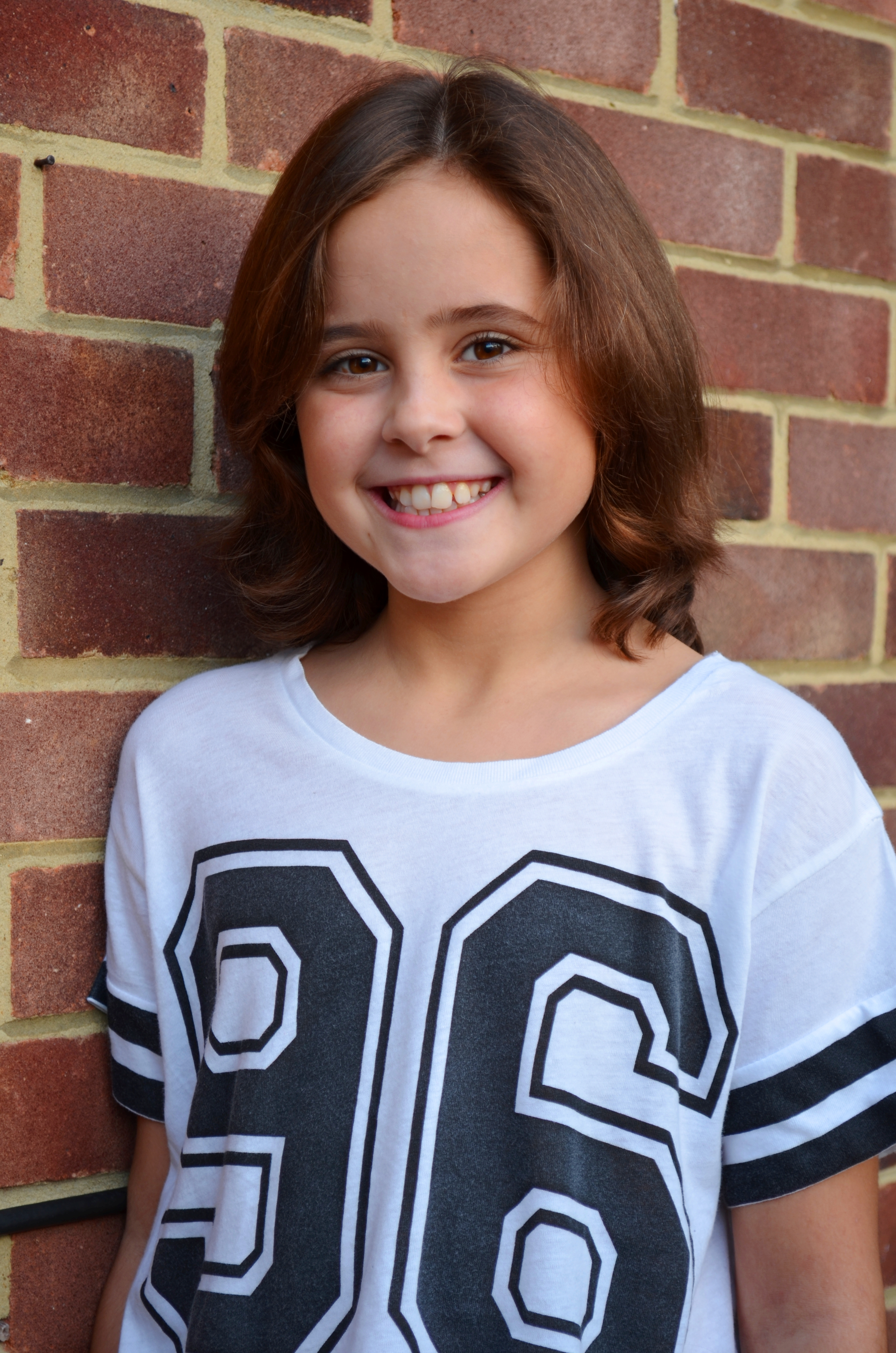
Tamsin Greig (left, pictured in 2010) guest-starred as Sally, a representative of WishmakerUK, while Lucy Hutchinson (right, pictured 2013) played Tamsin, on whose birthday the episode is set.

Gerard Gilbert of The Independent, Jack Seale of Radio Times, Dessau, and Owen all stressed that "Last Gasp" was weaker than the three previous episodes of Inside No. 9. Seale said there were "several sublime moments – but no knockout blow", while Dessau wrote that "it doesn't really go anywhere and it resolves itself a little too simplistically", and Owen felt that the episode "didn't manage to go anywhere very unexpected... and just sort of ended". All three suggested, however, that the episode still had its strengths; for Seale, it was as "brilliantly acted and constructed as you'd expect", Dessau considered it watchable, and Owen felt it was enjoyable to watch with a number of funny moments. Shennan, writing for the Liverpool Echo, wrote that "perhaps there had to be a dud – or, at least, disappointing – episode sooner or later", noting that you "can't win 'em all".

The acting in the episode was praised by Michael Hogan and Rachel Ward, who wrote in The Daily Telegraph that "with their gift for comedy, vulnerability and pathos, Tamsin Greig and Sophie Thompson ... deliver excellent performances". Similarly, Owen wrote that "the performances were good—especially from Thompson as the mousy housewife, and I liked the sour expressions from child star Hutchinson". Nonetheless, he thought it regrettable than a real-world musician had not been cast, especially as he considered it unlikely that Tamsin would admire Parsons. Awarding the episode three and a half out of five, he thought "the set-up ... sublime, the central dilemma amusing, and the execution typically brilliant". In the review published in The Star, "Last Gasp" was described as "hilarious". The title, it was suggested, is appropriate, "as I caught myself gasping more than once as its foul contents unfolded". Upton called the episode "a clever little piece".

Retrospective reviews have similarly framed "Last Gasp" as weaker that other episodes of Inside No. 9. It is frequently omitted from lists of the programme's best episodes, while it appears towards the bottom on others. Hogan, writing for The Daily Telegraph, ranked "Last Gasp" as the worst of the first 38 episodes of Inside No. 9, saying it "is sly and sardonic, but it lacks the show's trademark killer twist". Similarly, Mark Butler, writing for i, listed "Last Gasp" as the worst of the first 24 episodes of Inside No. 9, calling it a "rather on-the-nose satire of celebrity obsessions". Chortle placed the episode 33rd out of 37, saying the episode "lacked a major twist, and the modern morality tale was a bit too straightforward in its point-making. But it's a nice idea and Tamsin Grieg [sic] is great as the WishmakerUK representative". Conversely, the episode was placed as sixth out of 13 episodes in Radio Times, with Frances Taylor saying "Granted, there's no massive twist at the end, but the darkness of greed and disregard for life is both chilling and hilarious."

An interview with Shearsmith and Pemberton was published on the British comedy website Chortle.co.uk after Inside No. 9 won the Chortle Award for best TV show in 2015. The pair were asked if they would ever consider writing an episode with a happy ending. Pemberton responded by saying that "Last Gasp" had "quite a happy ending – and people hated that one!" Similarly, Shearsmith suggested that "people are disappointed if we don't deliver something horrible".

=== Viewing figures ===
Based on overnight viewing figures, (Note: The figures used in Broadcast come from Overnights.tv, where "overnight" data from the Broadcasters' Audience Research Board (BARB) is used and interpreted. Overnight figures are officially released by BARB, but include only VOSDAL (Viewing On Same Day As Live) data, which encompasses those who watch a programme as it is broadcast, as well as those who view it on the same day. BARB's final figures are published later, and incorporate further viewings and more precise timing data.) "Last Gasp" drew a lower viewership than any previous episode of Inside No. 9, with 872,000 viewers. In most UK listings, it was preceded by Line of Duty (series 2, episode 3: "Behind Bars"), which drew 2.2 million viewers (9.7% of the audience). However, the following episode of Inside No. 9, "The Understudy", drew a lower number of viewers still, with 720,000 viewers. The final episode of the first series, "The Harrowing", saw an increase in viewing figures, leaving "Last Gasp" with the second-lowest viewership of the series, below the series average of 904,000 people, and the slot average of 970,000 people.

== Charity auction ==
Pemberton listed a balloon containing his breath that had appeared on "Last Gasp" on eBay. Listed with the balloon was a copy of the episode's poster signed by Pemberton and Shearsmith. The auction was held to raise money for Give It Up, a Sport Relief charity founded by the comedian Russell Brand to help those recovering from alcoholism and drug addiction. The winning bid on the auction was for £265.00.
