= The Understudy (Inside No. 9) =

- Inside No. 9 episode
- Episode no.: Series 1 Episode 5
- Directed by: David Kerr
- Written by: Steve Pemberton; Reece Shearsmith
- Original air date: 5 March 2014
- Running time: 30 minutes

Guest appearances
- Lyndsey Marshal as Laura; Julia Davis as Felicity; Rosie Cavaliero as Kirstie; Roger Sloman as Bill; Di Botcher as Jean; Richard Cordery as Nick; Bruce Mackinnon as an actor playing Malcolm; Jo Stone-Fewings as an actor playing Macduff

Episode chronology
← Previous "Last Gasp"	Next → "The Harrowing"

"The Understudy" is the fifth episode of the first series of the British dark comedy anthology series Inside No. 9. It was first broadcast on 5 March 2014 on BBC Two. The episode was written by and starred Steve Pemberton and Reece Shearsmith, and guest-starred Lyndsey Marshal, Julia Davis, Rosie Cavaliero, Roger Sloman, Di Botcher, Richard Cordery, Bruce Mackinnon and Jo Stone-Fewings. Pemberton plays actor Tony, who is starring as Macbeth in a West End production of Shakespeare's Macbeth, and Shearsmith plays Jim, Tony's understudy. The plot of "The Understudy" partially mirrors the story of Macbeth, exploring the theme of power and the lives of actors.

The episode took longer to write than any other in the first series of Inside No. 9, and was redrafted several times owing to the writers' uncertainty as to whether the characters should be amateurs or professionals. It is presented in five separate acts, mirroring theatrical norms. Critics responded positively to "The Understudy", praising it as an improvement upon the previous week's episode "Last Gasp". They stressed the links between "The Understudy" and Macbeth, but said that viewers would not need to be familiar with Shakespeare's work in order to enjoy the episode. On its first showing, "The Understudy" was watched by 720,000 viewers (4.1% of the market); this was the lowest viewership of the series so far.

== Production ==
Writers Steve Pemberton and Reece Shearsmith, who had previously worked together on The League of Gentlemen and Psychoville, took inspiration for Inside No. 9 from "David and Maureen", episode 4 of the first series of Psychoville. This episode, in turn, was inspired by Alfred Hitchcock's Rope. "David and Maureen" took place entirely in a single room, and was filmed in only two shots. At the same time, the concept of Inside No. 9 was a "reaction" to Psychoville, with Shearsmith saying that "We'd been so involved with labyrinthine over-arcing, we thought it would be nice to do six different stories with a complete new house of people each week. That's appealing, because as a viewer you might not like this story, but you've got a different one next week." As an anthology series with horror themes, Inside No. 9 also pays homage to Tales of the Unexpected, The Twilight Zone, and Alfred Hitchcock Presents.

As the format of Inside No. 9 requires new characters each week, the writers were able to attract actors who may have been unwilling to commit to an entire series. In addition to Pemberton and Shearsmith, who played lead actor Tony and understudy Jim respectively, the episode starred Lyndsey Marshal as Laura, Julia Davis as Felicity, Rosie Cavaliero as Kirstie, Roger Sloman as Bill, Di Botcher as Jean, and Richard Cordery as Nick. In addition, Bruce Mackinnon provided the voice of an actor playing Malcolm in Macbeth, and Jo Stone-Fewings provided the voice of an actor playing Macduff.

The episode was written and is presented in a five-act structure to mirror theatrical norms. This allowed for jumps in time within the episode, as well as marking it out from others in the series. The plot is essentially based on Macbeth, leading Pemberton to suggest that the episode might be used "on an O Level syllabus" in the future. Unlike other episodes in the series, "The Understudy" did not take place in a family home, and for this reason, the writers were keen not to alienate viewers. After the initial idea of a group of characters backstage at a production of Macbeth, the writers re-scripted several times, unsure of whether the characters should be amateurs, members of a touring company or professionals. This meant that the script-writing took longer for "The Understudy" than for any other episode of the first series of Inside No. 9. The script eventually settled on actors at a West End theatre. For Shearsmith, it mattered that the actors had a "real chance" and that there were high stakes. The episode, he suggested, reflected happenings in a real theatre, rather than a television version. Pemberton said that the West End setting allowed for the "agonising" scene of a post-performance visit from audience members.

== Plot ==
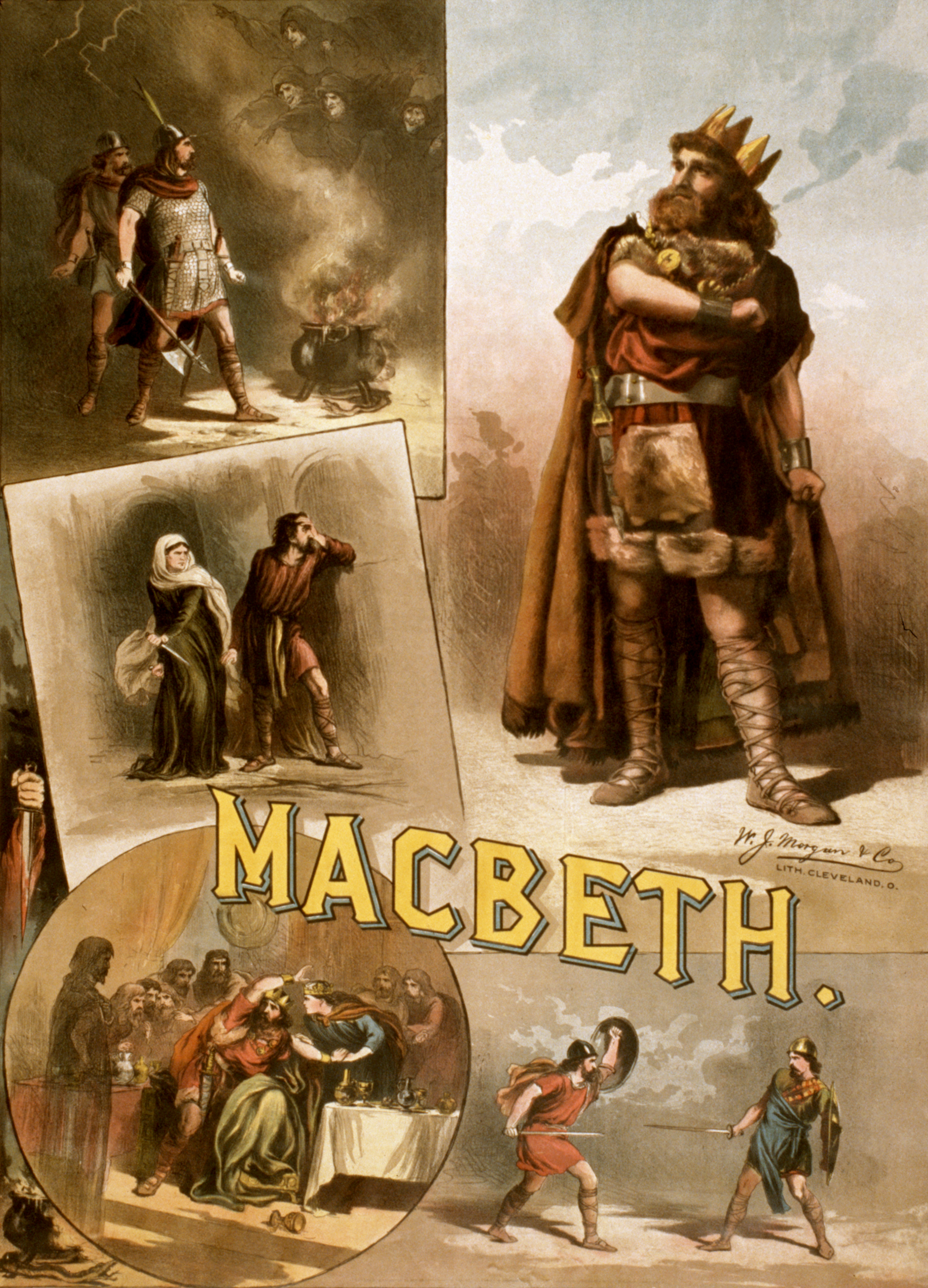
The plot revolves around, and partially mirrors, William Shakespeare's Macbeth.

Act I

Tony Warner is starring in the lead role of Macbeth at the Duke of Cambridge Theatre. Coming back to his dressing room after a performance, he is visited by his understudy Jim. When invited to attend the understudy rehearsal, Tony makes an excuse about having a voiceover job at that time; and the pair are joined by Tony's neighbours Jean and Bill, who have just watched Tony's performance and invite him to dinner. Tony tries the same excuse with them but is unsuccessful. Tony leaves with them, and Jim puts on Tony's prop crown, imagining himself in the leading role.

Act II

Before the understudy rehearsal, Jim's fiancée Laura (the understudy for Lady Macbeth) helps him learn lines in Tony's dressing room. Company manager Felicity arrives and scolds them for using the room. While Jim is absent, Felicity flirts with Laura. Laura asks Tony's dresser, Kirstie, what he earns, before opening Tony's payslip to see for herself. She is determined for Jim to appear as Macbeth, which would allow them to save for their wedding. Laura cuts herself on a pin that Kirstie left in the Lady Macbeth dress, and after she and Kirstie leave the room, Jim sees a drop of blood on the floor grow into a large puddle. When he looks again, it has gone.

Act III

During a Friday night performance, Tony is drunk as he comes backstage during the interim between his part in Acts IV and V. Felicity is angry that Tony, a recovering alcoholic, got drunk again; she has had to issue several refunds because of his drunken behaviour on stage. She sends him into the shower to sober up, and summons Jim. He is unsure whether he knows the lines well enough to go onstage in Tony's place, but Laura encourages him to take the chance. As she hands him a prop dagger, he sees blood all over the dagger and her hands. Tony comes out of the shower and wants to finish the performance, so Jim allows him to go. Laura berates Jim for his lack of ambition. She is left alone in the dressing room and hears noises coming from the shower; but when she goes to look, it is empty. A scream is then heard from the stage, and the stage manager calls for a medic.

Act IV

Jim has taken over the role of Macbeth. It is mentioned that Tony fell off the battlements on stage, and is in hospital. Felicity has been sacked after she was accused of sexual harassment. Laura arrives to congratulate Jim, and he thanks her for encouraging him. He is distant, eventually asking her to leave him to prepare alone. As he puts on his crown in front of the mirror, he hears the sound of whispering, and sees blood pouring from both his eyes and the mirror.

Act V

Nineteen months later, Jim is a famous actor playing the title role in Richard III at the theatre, using the same, now redecorated, dressing room. A paralysed Tony comes backstage to visit him and talks about how far Jim's career has come. Jim broke up with Laura and has not seen her since his run in Macbeth. After Tony leaves, Kirstie arrives to see Jim. She is now Tony's full-time carer. She has watched Jim's performance every day of the week, and says she knew that he just needed "a little push" to achieve greatness. She tells him that Laura committed suicide by slitting her wrists in the dressing room's shower. Jim did not know about this, because he was overseas filming a role in Game of Thrones at the time. He believes that Laura pushed Tony off the battlements and could not live with her guilt. Kirstie reveals that she herself is the one who pushed Tony, and spiked his juice with alcohol backstage. She also got Felicity sacked because Felicity would not let Jim perform as Macbeth. Kirstie is wearing the engagement ring that she took from Laura's corpse. She tells Jim that she is waiting for him "in the wings ... like an understudy". She leaves, and as Jim prepares to go onstage, he sees bloody visions of Laura's death.

== Reception ==
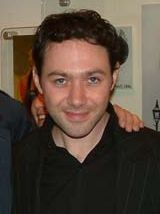
The performance of Shearsmith (pictured in 2003) as the eponymous understudy was praised.

Critics responded very positively to "The Understudy", with several drawing attention to the improvement over "Last Gasp", the previous week's episode. Bruce Dessau called it a "striking return to form" on his website, and Gerard Gilbert, writing in The Independent, called it "a return to form" after the previous week's "misfire". Writers in The Sunday Times called the episode "[a]nother exquisite short story", Ben Lawrence, writing in the Daily Telegraph, called it a "gloriously OTT tale", and John Robinson, writing for The Guardian, described it as an "excellent instalment" of the series. He identified the themes of the episode by calling it "a spooky and highly satirical take on actors, Shakespeare and power".

Critics stressed that a knowledge of Macbeth was not necessary to enjoy the episode. "Knowing the text", suggested Jack Seale of Radio Times, "will take you only halfway and, in any case, the clever plot is really just a vehicle for characters sketched fully in only a few lines, and a torrent of fruity luvvie gags about jealousy, superstition and stage-hogging hams." Dessau agreed, saying that "[y]ou don't need to be a literary scholar to get the gags". Critic Jane Simon, writing in the Daily Mirror, suggested that "even a hazy knowledge of the Scottish play will tip you the wink what might lie ahead". David Chater in The Times and an anonymous reviewer in the Sunday Herald both praised the plot's divergence from Shakespeare, with the latter saying that "the script cleverly offers parallels with The Scottish Play, just to whip them away again". Dessau felt that the complex plot meant that the guest stars did "not get quite as much screen time as they deserve", but that this was no complaint, as it was "very much Pemberton and Shearsmith's instalment and they are both brilliant".

On its first showing, "The Understudy" was watched by 720,000 viewers (4.1% of the market). This was lower than "Last Gasp", the previous episode, which in turn had had the lowest viewership of the series on its first airing, with 872,000 viewers (4.9% of the audience). "The Understudy" was immediately preceded in most listings by Line of Duty, which was watched by a series high of 2.3 million viewers (9.9% of the audience).
