= The Protectors (Danish TV series) =

Crime television series

- Intertitle
- Livvagterne
- Genre: Police procedural
- Created by: Mai Brostrøm; Peter Thorsboe
- Starring: Cecilie Stenspil; Søren Vejby; André Babikian; Thomas W. Gabrielsson; Ditte Gråbøl; Rasmus Bjerg; Ellen Hillingsø; Tommy Kenter; Michael Sand; Benjamin Boe Rasmussen
- Country of origin: Denmark
- Original language: Danish
- No. of seasons: 2
- No. of episodes: 20

Production
- Producers: Sven Clausen; Peter Nadermann; Anne-Marie Vidkjær
- Production company: Danmarks Radio

Original release
- Network: DR1
- Release: January 1, 2009 – March 7, 2010

The Protectors (Danish: Livvagterne) is a Danish crime TV series from 2009 that follows the police bodyguard squad P.E.T. (Politiets Efterretningstjeneste), which is in charge of protecting VIPs, including Danish royalty and politicians.

== Synopsis ==
The series follows three recruits, Jasmina El-Murad, Jonas Goldschmidt, and Rasmus Poulsen, who go swiftly from training camp to fully-fledged police bodyguards. Jasmina is the only woman, and an Egyptian Muslim, on the team.

== Cast ==
- Cecilie Stenspil as Jasmina El-Murad, a newly trained bodyguard; she is the only woman in the class of 20 who train to become bodyguards
- Søren Vejby as Rasmus Poulsen, a newly trained bodyguard; he lives in a church building he renovated
- André Babikian as Jonas Goldschmidt, a newly trained bodyguard; he is Jewish and is married with one child. In the second episode he tells his wife he had an affair
- Thomas W. Gabrielsson as Leon Hartvig Jensen, PET's Chief of Security
- Ditte Gråbøl as Diana Pedersen, Secretary at PET
- Rasmus Bjerg as 'Lille Kurt' Birk, the PET Group Leader who is in charge of training the new bodyguards
- Ellen Hillingsø as Benedikte 'Tønne' Tønnesen, PET
- Tommy Kenter as Jørgen Boas, PET psychiatrist
- Michael Sand as Store Kurt, a veteran bodyguard
- Benjamin Boe Rasmussen as Trikker
- Kim Jansson as Fjordby
- Anne Birgitte Lind as Claudia
- Kate Kjølby as Asha El-Murad, Jasmina's sister

== Production ==
The Protectors was created by husband and wife writing duo Mai Brostrøm and Peter Thorsboe. The pair have written several successful series, including Unit One and The Eagle, winning three Emmy Awards. They have subsequently created the 2023 crime drama series Oxen.

The series was filmed on location in Copenhagen (Denmark).

== Broadcast ==
A first season aired in 2009. A second and final season was released in 2010. Each season had 10 episodes.

The series screened in Australia in 2011 and 2012 on SBS. It is available on DVD and Hulu with English subtitles.

== Awards and nominations ==
It won an International Emmy Award from the International Academy of Television Arts and Sciences for best non-American television drama series in 2009.

Awards and nominations for The Protectors
Year	Award	Category	Nominee	Result
2009	International Emmy Award	Best TV drama series	The Protectors	Won
