= Otto the Rhino =

- Film poster
- Directed by: Kenneth Kainz
- Screenplay by: Rune Schjøtt
- Based on: Otto the Rhino by Ole Lund Kirkegaard
- Produced by: Nina Crone; Erik Wilstrupn
- Edited by: Per Düring Risager
- Music by: Halfdan E. Søren Siegumfeldt
- Production company: Crone Film
- Distributed by: SF Studios
- Release date: 7 February 2013
- Running time: 76 minutes
- Country: Denmark
- Language: Danish
- Box office: $2,403,520

Otto the Rhino (Danish: Otto er et næsehorn, lit. 'Otto is a rhinoceros') is a 2013 Danish animated comedy film directed by Kenneth Kainz from a screenplay by Rune Schjøtt, based on the 1972 children's book of the same name by the children's author Ole Lund Kirkegaard. It is the third and final film in a trilogy of computer-animated films based on children's books by Kirkegaard, after Freddy Frogface (2011) and Jelly T (2012). It was later dubbed into English and was released into several other countries.

== Voice cast ==
- Lasse Kamper as Topper "Tops"
- Nikolai Aamand as Viggo
- Asta Danielsson as Sille
- Lars Brygmann as Hr. Lion
- Lars Knutzon as Holm
- Tommy Kenter as Chief of Police
- Bodil Jørgensen as Mrs. Flora
- Helle Dolleris as Mrs. Løwe
- Søs Egelind as the teacher
- Kaya Brüel as Topper's mother
- Tom Jensen as Topper's father
- Henrik Koefoed as Folmer
- Rebecca Brüel as Almanda
- Jens Jacob Tychsen as the zoo director

== Release ==
Otto the Rhino was released in Danish cinemas on 7 February 2013, where it grossed $2,370,662 for a total of $2,403,520. It was nominated for the Robert Award for Best Children's Film at the 31st Robert Awards.
