= Cecilie Stenspil =

Danish actress (born 1979)

- Born: Cecilie Maria Stenspil; 22 October 1979 (age 46); Glostrup, Denmark
- Occupation: Actress
- Years active: 2006–present
- Partner: Troels Lyby
- Children: 2

Cecilie Maria Stenspil (born 22 October 1979) is a Danish actress. She graduated from the School of Acting at Odense Teater in 2006.

She has had leading roles in a large number of performances at several Danish theaters, including the Royal Danish Theatre, Aarhus Theater, Odense Teater, and at the Folketeateret and she has starred in several films and TV series. In addition, she has voiced a huge number of cartoon, movie, and video game productions.

== Career ==
As a child, Stenspil was a student at the children's theater Eventyrteatret for 5 years. Since she was 10 years old, she has voiced various cartoons and cartoon series. In addition, she has recorded a number of audio books, including Lene Kaaberbøl's Skyggeporten.

In 2009, she made her debut in front of the camera as Jasmina El-Murad in The Protectors.

She plays Mrs. Helene Aurland in all the episodes of Badehotellet on TV 2.

Cecilie Stenspil received the Ove Sprogøe Prize of DKK 30,000 on 21 December 2010, on Ove Sprogøe's 91st birthday. In addition to the mentioned award, she has received Poul Reumert's honorary scholarship, Prince Henrik's scholarship and Tagea Brandt's travel scholarship.

In 2017, she participated in Peter Langdal's Efter brylluppet together with Kasper Leisner and Barbara Moleko.

== Personal life ==
Stenspil is the daughter of the educator Lisbeth Stenspil and Børge Krogh Samuelsen. She is the older sister of Simon Stenspil, and is half Faroese.

Since 2013, Stenspil is the life partner of fellow actor Troels Lyby. They have two children together born in August 2018 and again in 2020.

== Theater ==
- 2016 Aarhus Theater: Fornuft og følelse – Marianne Dashwood
- 2013 Royal Danish Theatre, Ulvedalene: Robin Hood – Lady Marian
- 2013 Forum Copenhagen: Hey Jude Teaterkoncert
- 2012 Folketeatret: Bang og Betty – Betty Nansen
- 2012 Grønnegårds Teatret: Educating Rita – Rita Susan White
- 2012 Nørrebros Theater: Next to Normal – Diana Goodman
- 2011 Royal Danish Theatre: Mågen – Nina
- 2010 Royal Danish Theatre: My Fair Lady – Eliza Doolittle
- 2009 Odense Teater: Breaking the Waves – Bess
- 2007 Odense Teater: Guitaristerne – Kim
- 2007 Odense Teater: The Wonderful Wizard of Oz – Dorothy
- 2007 Odense Teater: Peter Pan – Wendy
- 2006 Odense Teater: Erasmus Montanus – Lisbed
- 2006 Odense Teater: A Christmas Carol – Bella

== Filmography ==
=== Film ===
Year	Film	Role	Notes
2010	Tangled	Rapunzel	Danish dubbing
2015	Cinderella	Cinderella's mother	Danish dubbing
2015	Lang historie kort	Eva	
2019	Kollision	Olivia	

=== TV series ===
Year	TV series	Role	Notes
2001	Totally Spies!	Alex	Danish dubbing
2004	Winx Club	Stella	Danish dubbing
2007	Total Drama Island	Courtney	Danish dubbing
1998–2005	The Powerpuff Girls	Bellis, Div Roller	Danish dubbing
2000	X-Men: Evolution	Jean	Danish dubbing
2008	Dinosapien	Lauren	Danish dubbing
2009	The Protectors	Jasmina El-Murad	
2013–present	Badehotellet	Helene Aurland	

=== Video games ===
Year	Game	Role	Notes
2020	Assassin's Creed Valhalla	Eivor Varinsdottir (female) / Rosta	
