= Sunshine Barry & the Disco Worms =

2008 animated film

Sunshine Barry & The Disco Worms
- Danish theatrical release poster
- Directed by: Thomas Borch Nielsen
- Screenplay by: Thomas Borch Nielsen; Morten Dragsted
- Produced by: Nina Crone
- Edited by: Kirsten Skytte
- Music by: Jörg Lemberg
- Production companies: Crone Film; Radar Film
- Distributed by: Svensk Filmindustri
- Release dates: 10 October 2008 (Denmark); 29 October 2009 (Germany)
- Running time: 75 minutes
- Countries: Denmark; Germany
- Languages: Danish; German
- Budget: $5,000,000
- Box office: $6,371,879

Sunshine Barry & The Disco Worms (Danish: Disco ormene; German: Sunshine Barry und die Discowürmer; also known as simply Disco Worms) is a 2008 animated musical comedy film directed by Thomas Borch Nielsen from a screenplay by Nielsen and Morten Dragsted.

== Premise ==
Earthworm Barry gets no respect and lives at the bottom of the food chain, but one day he finds an old disco record which arouses his interest in music, and, with help from friend Tito, they decide to create the greatest disco band the world has ever seen: Sunshine Barry & The Disco Worms.

== Voice cast ==
- Peter Frödin as Bjarne (Barry)
- Lars Hjortshøj as Niller
- Trine Dyrholm as Gloria
- Troels Lyby as Jimmy
- Helle Dolleris as Donna
- Birthe Neumann as Mor
- Peter Hesse Overgaard as Far
- Henning Jensen as Tonni Dennis
- Niels Anders Thorn as Justesen
- Olaf Nielsen as Naturspeaker
- Kim Hagen Jensen as Promotor
- Tonni Zinck as Skolopender
- Casper Byriel Svane as Flue
- Kirsten Skytte and Margit Rosenaa as Døgnflue
- Fedor Bondarchuk as Tonni Dennis
- Denis Hückel as Käfer
- Olavi Uusivirta as Aaro

== Production ==
In total, production lasted 16 months on a budget of $5 million. According to Nielsen, the character designs and script took a year to complete. The film also faced difficulty with finding financing, which inevitably took 8 months to find.

== Release ==
The film was released in Danish theatres on 10 October 2008, and opened with $225,324 for a total of $1,936,776. In Germany, the film was released on 29 October 2009, and grossed $33,604. The worldwide gross for Sunshine Barry & The Disco Worms was $6,371,879.

Critically, the film received generally average to negative reviews.
