= Michael Lyons (sculptor) =

British sculptor (1943–2019)

Michael Lyons RSA FRSS
- Born: 10 July 1943; Bilston, Staffordshire, England
- Died: 19 April 2019 (aged 75); Cawood, North Yorkshire, England
- Known for: Metal sculpture

Michael Lyons RSA FRSS (10 July 1943 – 19 April 2019) was a British sculptor who was instrumental in the creation of the Yorkshire Sculpture Park.

== Education ==
Lyons was educated at Cotton College, Staffordshire, at Wolverhampton College of Art (1959–1963), Hornsey College of Art (1963–1964) and Newcastle University (1964–1967).

== Career ==
Lyons was Head of Sculpture at the Manchester Metropolitan University between 1989 and 1993 and also taught at college in the US, China, and Canada. He represented Britain in Biennales in China, Argentina, Mexico and Australia. His drawings and sculptures are in various collections, including those of the Canary Wharf Group, Arts Council England, the Henry Moore Institute, and the Yale Centre for British Art.

In 2011, three sculptures, 'Mayflower', 'Energy Of The Mountain: Echo And Revelation' and 'Energy Of The Mountain' were stolen from Lyons' studio and were never recovered.

He was a Trustee of the Ironbridge Open Air Museum of Steel Sculpture.

=== Exhibitions ===
Lyons has exhibited at various galleries, shows, and venues including:

- New School House Gallery: 'Half-light' (19 June 2015–15 August 2015).
- Leeds Art Gallery. 'Michael Lyons: Freeze Frame' (9 March 2016– 26 July 2016).
- One Canada Square Scale Appropriate on loan (31 March 2014– 23 May 2014).
- Yorkshire Sculpture Park.
- Macay Museo de Arte Contemporaneo.
- York Art Gallery / York Museum Gardens Michael Lyons: Ancient and Modern (25 May 2019–May 2020).

== Awards ==
In 1966, he featured in the Young Contemporaries in London and won a Peter Stuyvesant Prize at the 1967 Northern Young Contemporaries in Manchester. In 2006 he won the Premio Fondo Nacional de las Artes at Chaco Biennale, Argentina.

In 1994 he was elected as a Fellow of the Royal Society of Arts and as a Fellow of the Royal Society of Sculptors. He had also served as vice-president of the RSS from 1994–1997. Lyons was also an Honorary member of the Manchester Academy of Fine Arts.

== Gallery ==
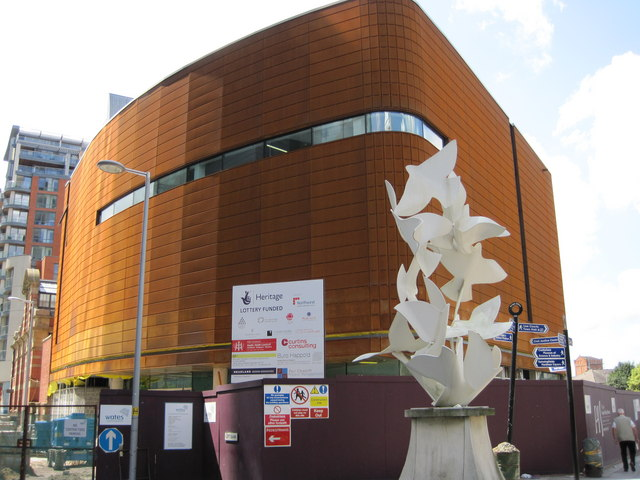
Doves of Peace at The People's History Museum

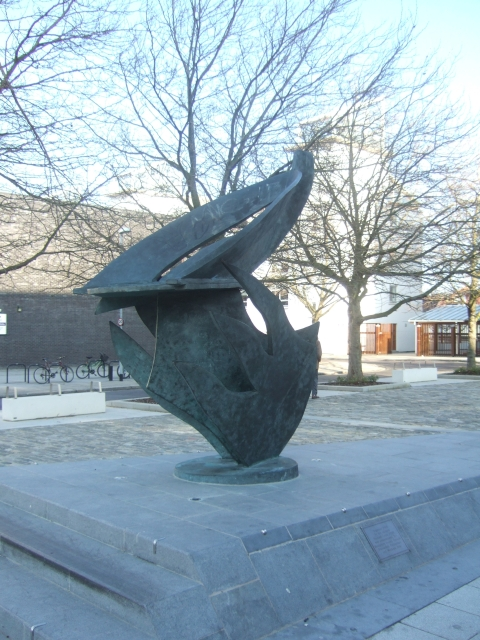
Argonaut 1909'

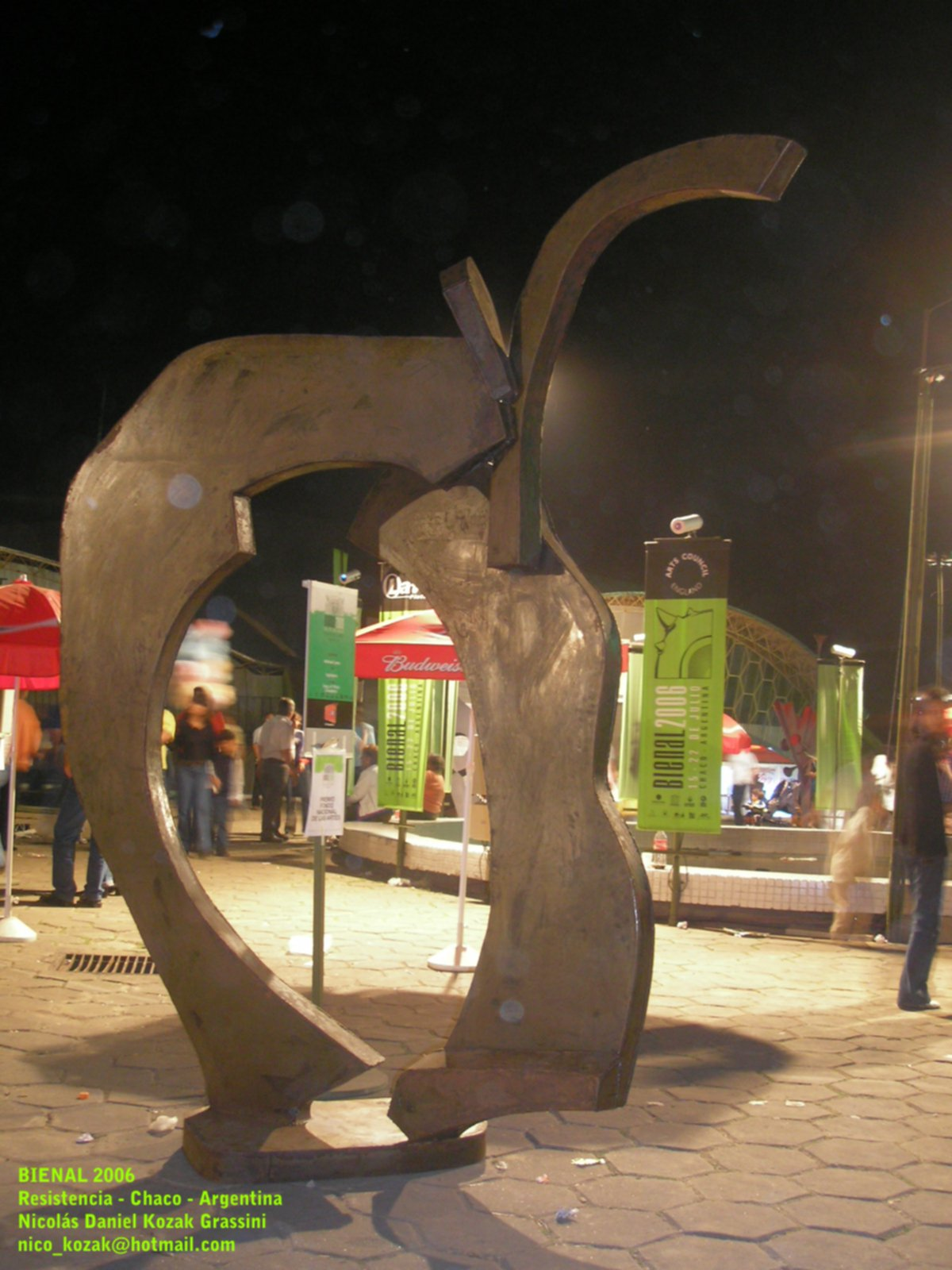
At the Argentinia Bienalle, 2006

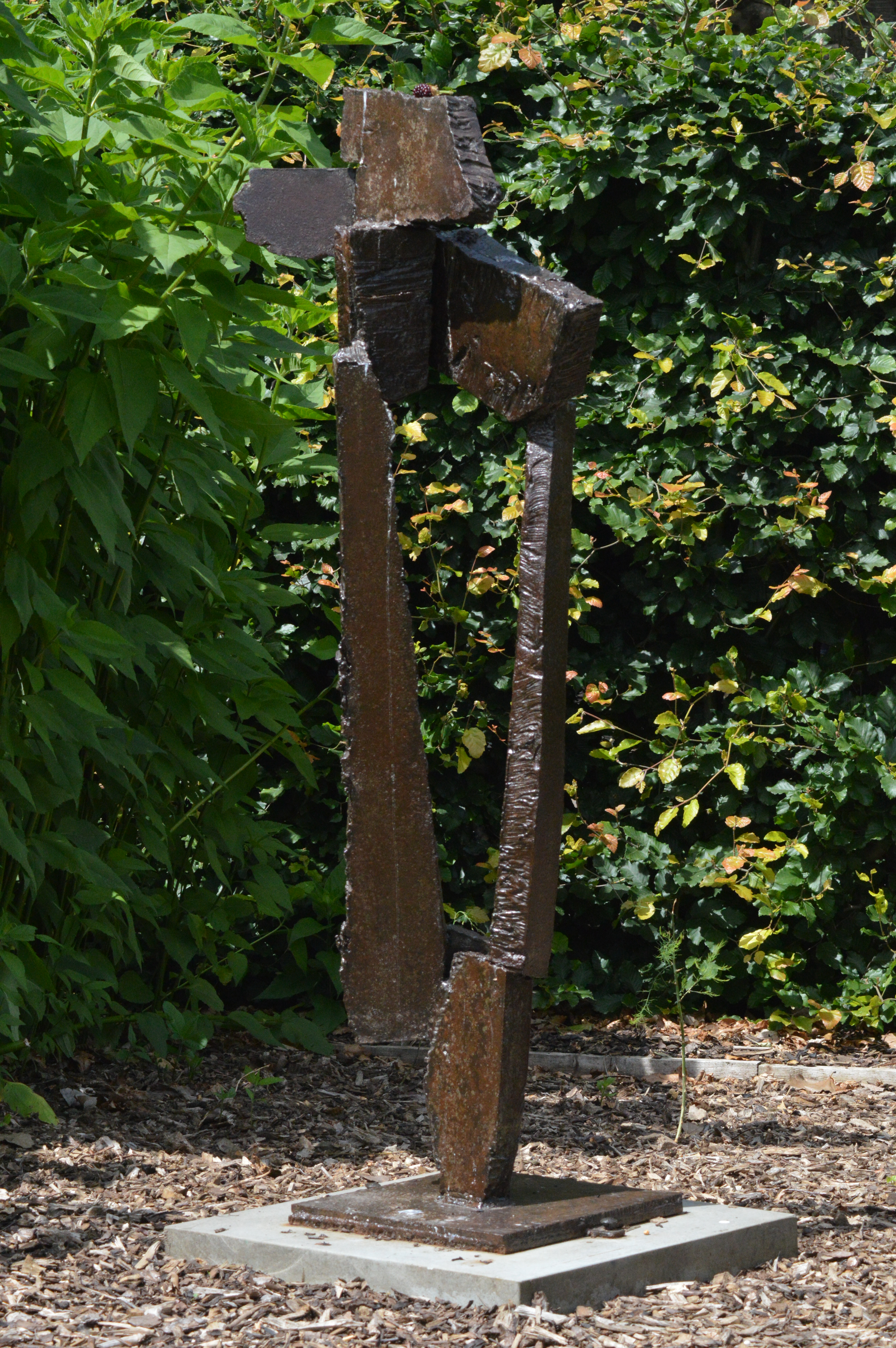
Michaelmas (1983) in the York Museum Gardens, 2019

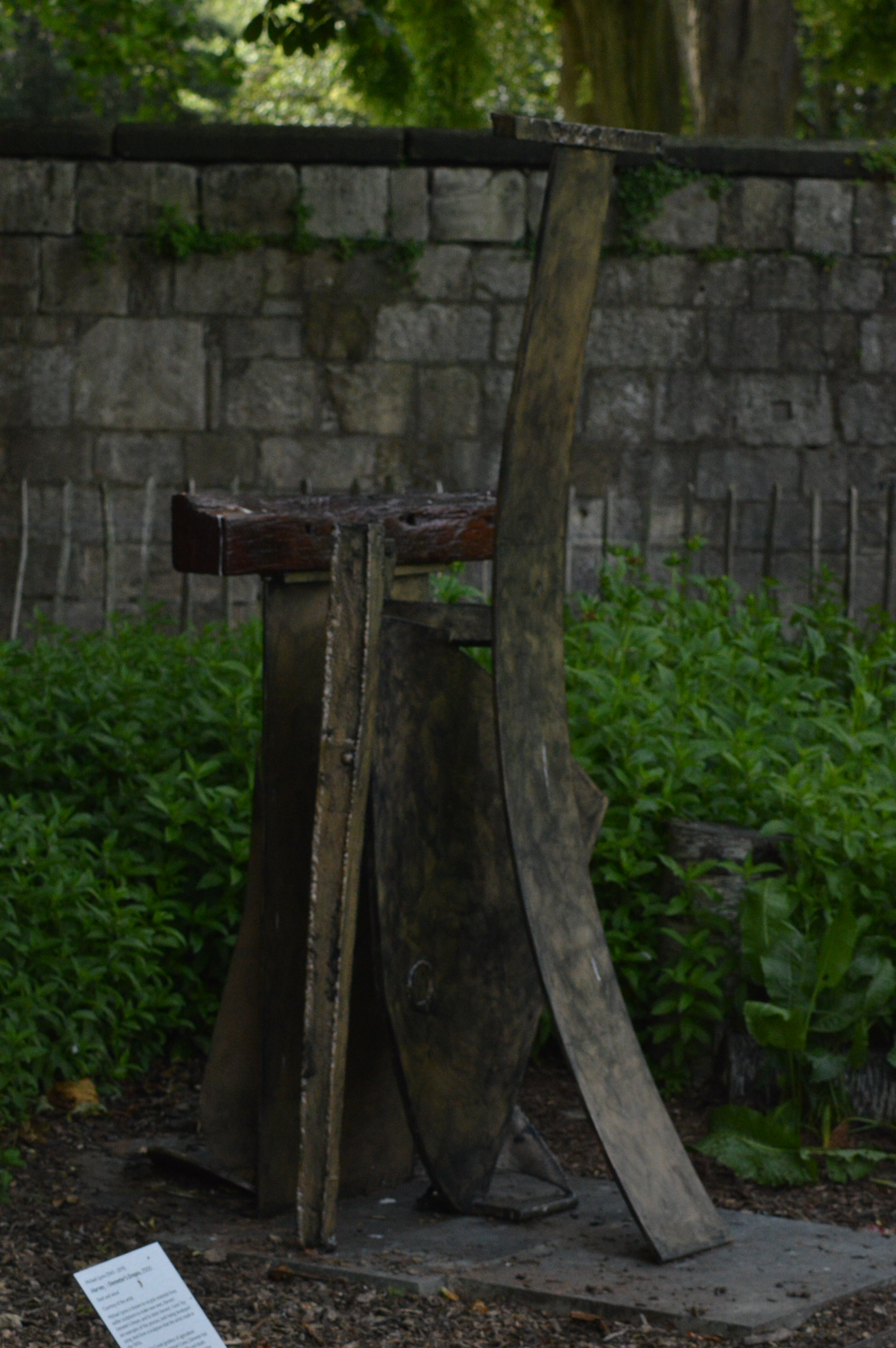
Harvest: Demeter's Dream (2000) in the York Museum Gardens, 2019

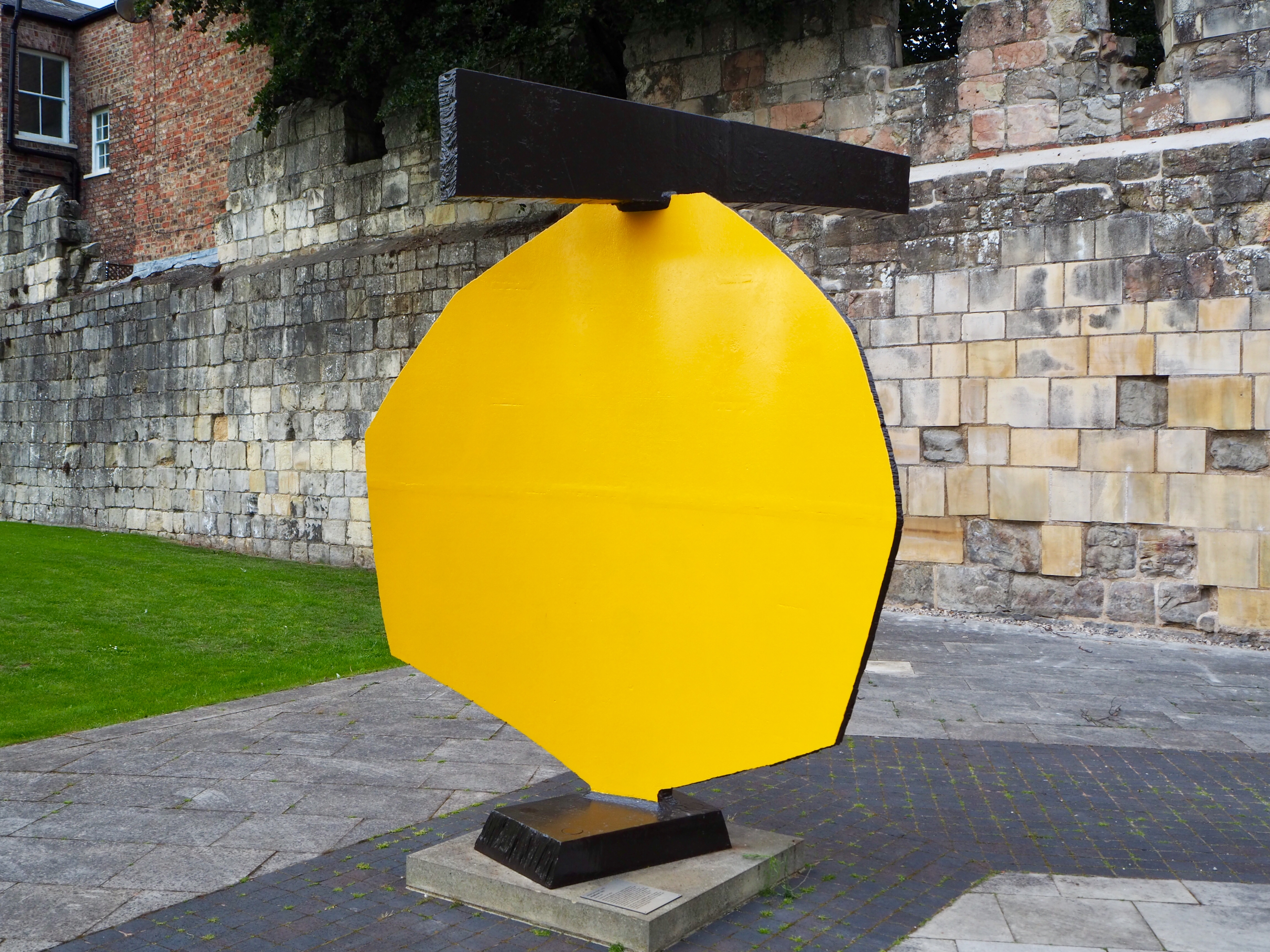
Mayflower (1983) in the grounds of York Art Gallery, 2019

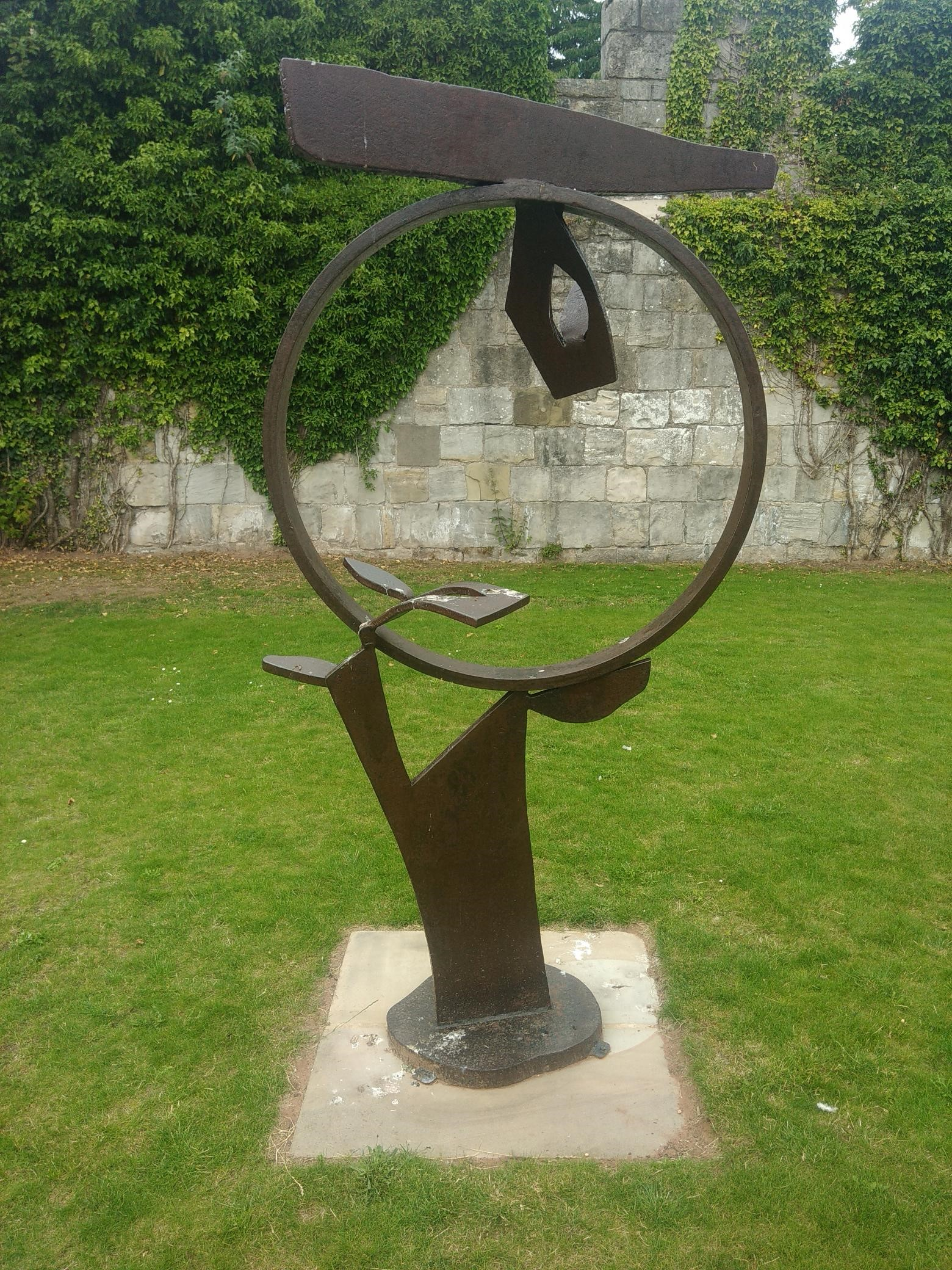
Michaelmas (1982) in the York Museum Gardens, 2019

== Personal life ==
Lyons grew up in the Black Country, and the area's post-war industrial landscape had a life-long influence on his work, as did his strong Catholic upbringing and, in later life, his interest in mythology and cosmology. In 1970 he married Stephanie Kay, whom he had met while they were students in the Department of Fine Art at Newcastle University and together they had a son David born in 1975 and daughter Anna in 1978. In 1977 he moved to Cawood, near York where he established a studio.

== Legacy ==
In Lyon's Obituary in the Yorkshire Post, Peter Murray wrote: "His drawings often portrayed a sensitive response to landscape which had a strong influence on his powerful sculptures, which looked at home in the landscape."

In an obituary in the Guardian he was described as: "...one of the group of artists who developed successful careers from a non-metropolitan base. Such strength of mind was the driving force that Michael and others, principally Peter Murray, engaged to create the Yorkshire Sculpture Park in 1977...so many young artists rushed off to London, and lost immediate connection with land and sky. It is this vision that Michael instinctively wound into his sculpture, while Yorkshire also gave him 'the freedom to cut metal and smoke cigars'".
