= Austin Andrew Wright =

British sculptor and teacher

Austin Andrew Wright (4 June 1911, Chester – 22 February 1997, Upper Poppleton, York) was a British sculptor and teacher.

Austin Wright, photograph courtesy of David Bocking with whom copyright remains

== Life ==
Wright was brought up in Cardiff where he took his first artistic steps in evening classes at Cardiff Art School before studying Modern Languages at New College, Oxford. Following his teacher training his first post was at The Downs, the Malvern College preparatory school, in 1934, where he taught painting and sculpture as well as French and German. W.H. Auden was a fellow teacher there.

He moved to Yorkshire in 1937 and lived and worked in York (where Auden was born), initially at Bootham School, where he had earlier undertaken his teacher-training and where he began working as a sculptor. Without any formal art training, Austin, according to James Hamilton, The sculpture of Austin Wright, 1994. “approached Henry Moore for advice and encouragement, and recalled being told, quite bluntly, just to get on with it.”

He branched out into teaching art, subsequently moving to The Mount, where he met Sue Midgley. By the end of the war, and the conclusion of her training at the Central School of Speech and Drama, they married and moved, in 1946, into the 1793 house on the Green at Upper Poppleton that would become integral to his work.

He was a pivotal figure in the development of sculpture from the 1940s onwards.

By 1954 he had given up teaching to devote his time to sculpture and drawing.

== Works ==
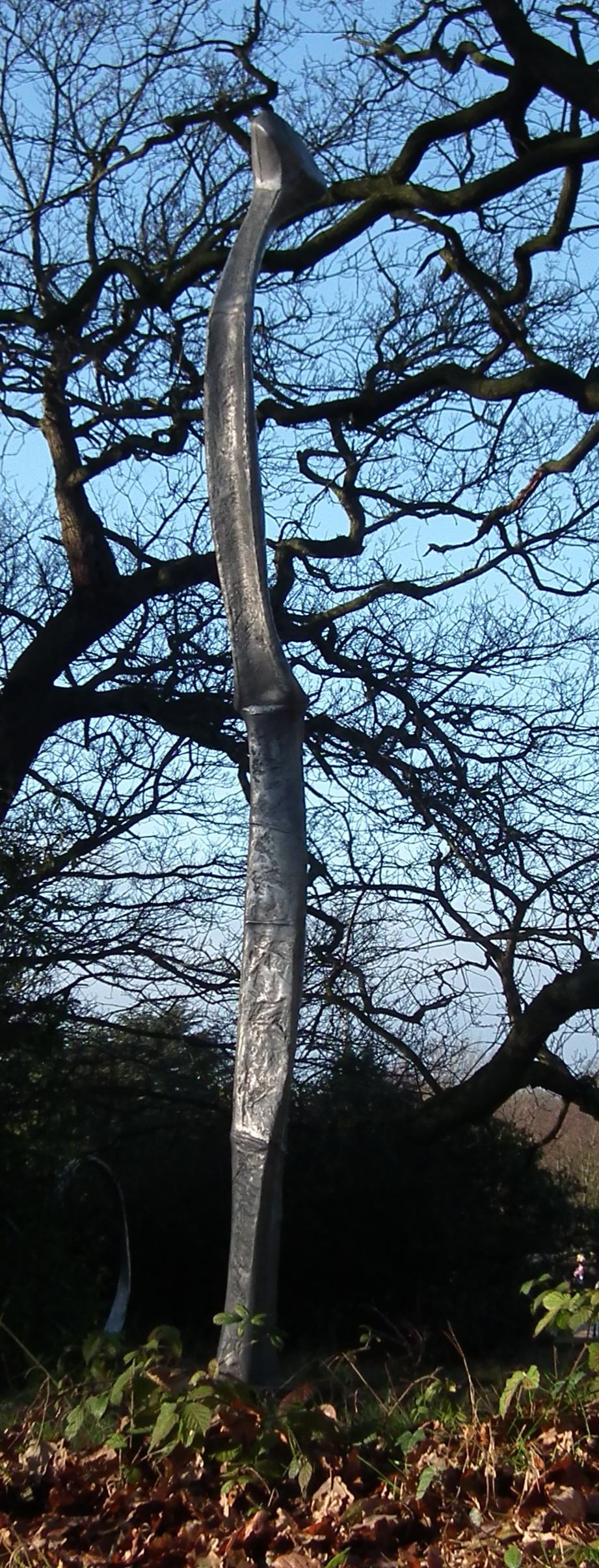
Mute 2 by Austin Wright at Yorkshire Sculpture Park.

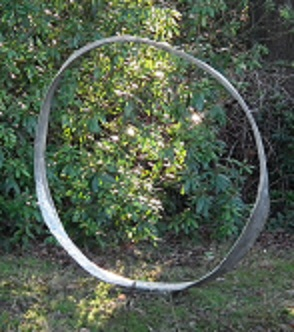
Ring by Austin Wright at Yorkshire Sculpture Park.

Wright's early success was fairly rapid. After exhibiting in “Modern Art in Yorkshire” in 1955 alongside Eduardo Paolozzi, Kenneth Armitage and Elisabeth Frink, he was invited by The British Council to show in “Younger British Sculptors”, an exhibition that toured Sweden in 1956. This exhibition included Reg Butler, Lynn Chadwick, William Turnbull and Geoffrey Clarke but it was of Wright that the Guardian art critic, Charles Sewter, wrote: “It would not be outrageous to claim that Wright is the most gifted sculptor working in Britain today”.

Although influenced by Henry Moore, and usually seen as an abstract artist, in fact Austin followed his own path, going through several phases in his career, working with different materials and ideas, and making very many sketches as well as sculptures, often figurative as well as abstract. He was strongly influenced by the landscape and flora of Yorkshire; his work revealing the inspiration he felt from nature.

His work, ’’The Argument’’, won the acquisition prize at the São Paulo Biennial in 1957.

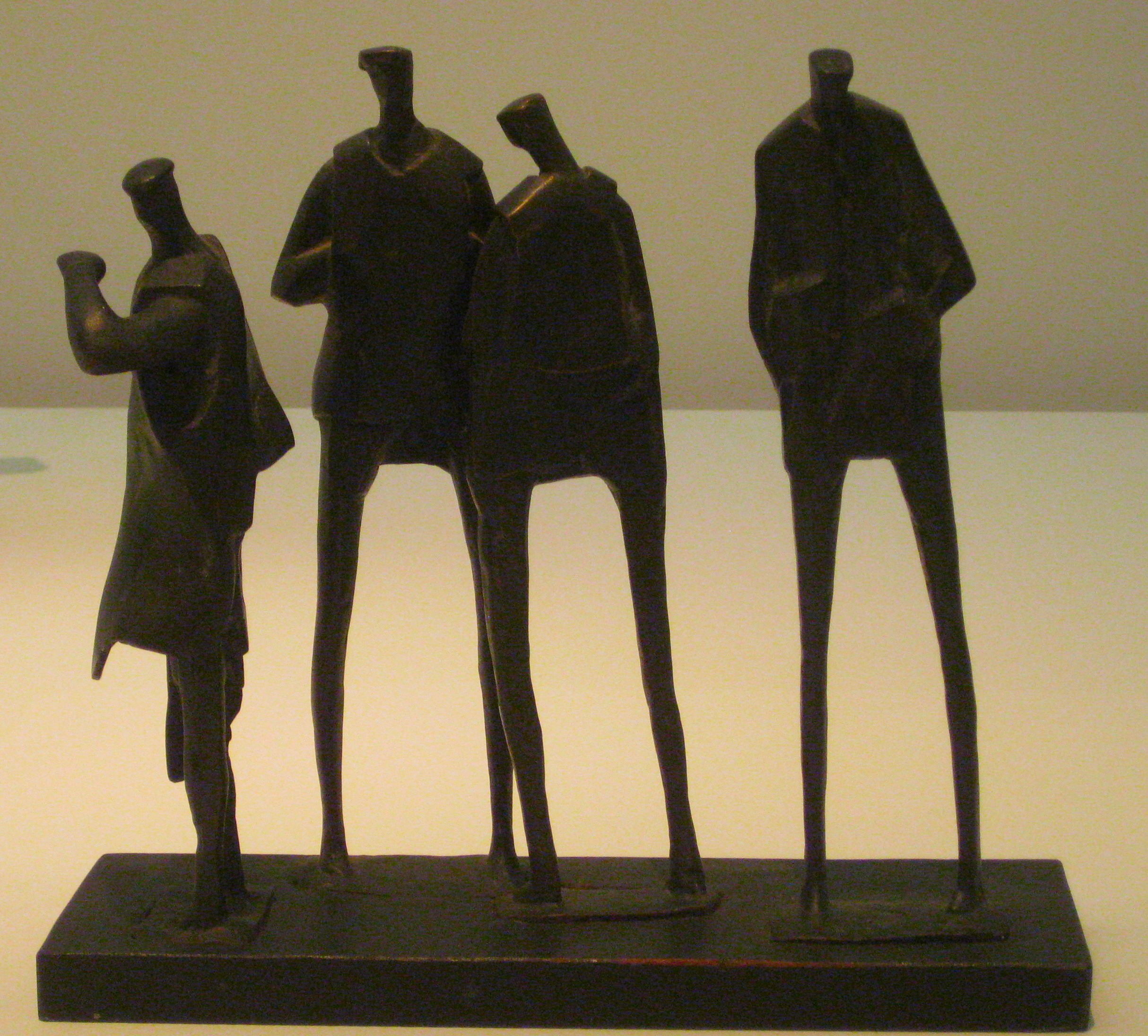
The Argument at The Hepworth, Wakefield, bronze, owned by Sue Wright, Andrew's widow

He was Gregory Fellow in Sculpture at Leeds University from 1961-4 and was awarded an Honorary Degree in 1977 by The University of York, where two of his sculptures can be found.

Despite the praise that Austin Wright’s work has received, he is, on the whole, a greatly neglected sculptor. Although his work has been exhibited widely, with many one-man exhibitions in London and Europe, he is more known in the North of England, with major retrospectives at Wakefield (1960), Newcastle upon Tyne (1974), the Yorkshire Sculpture Park (1984), Hull (1988) and York (2011). Examples of his work can be seen on public display in Bradford, Leeds, York, and New College, Oxford.

Sadly, some of Austin Wright’s works have been vandalised, destroyed or stolen. One of his best-known works, Two Rings, which sat on Roppa Moor, Helmsley, was assumed to have been (in the words of Wright’s widow, Sue) “removed by the “metal merchants of Middlesbrough”, to melt them down for scrap”.

Further examples of Austin’s works can be viewed at Yorkshire Sculpture Park.

The Hart Gallery also has a page of some of his sculptures and drawings.

A film about Austin Wright was made in 1970, with the assistance of the Yorkshire Arts Association, by Harry Duffin, who first met Austin when he came to give a lecture to fellow art students. The film can be viewed in the Yorkshire Film Archive.

== Obituary ==
As Timothy Rogers wrote in Wright’s obituary in the Guardian:

“Diffident, modest, as quick to discount praise as to make light of disappointment, deeply rooted in his adopted Yorkshire, he was no more willing to court favours from the metropolis than were London critics to travel north.”

Michael Lyons wrote in Sculpture in 1997 that:

“… it was also true that he could have been better known and many people were aware of this. It was not in his nature to seek the limelight, and I think he needed the peace and quiet which allowed him to produce the wonderful, sensitive and ‘innocent’ works which he did. Over exposure would have destroyed his talent and I think he knew it”

A fuller obituary can be found in The Independent, written by James Hamilton.
