= Roy Kitchin =

British sculptor and art educator

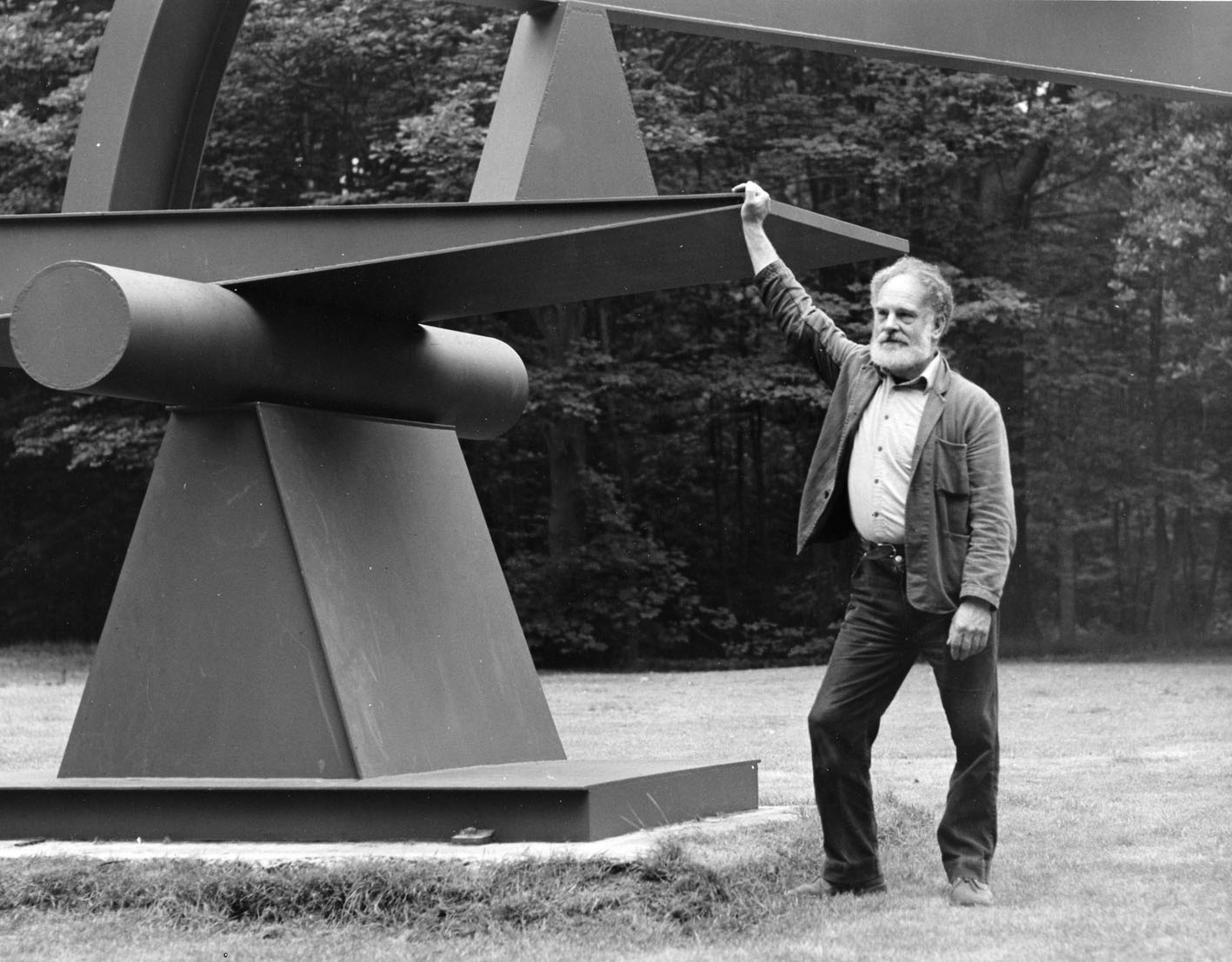
Roy Kitchin with '3BS', 1985.

Roy Kitchin (6 December 1926 – 1997) was a British sculptor and art educator who worked primarily with steel. He was lecturer in Sculpture at Newcastle University. He co-founded the Open Air Museum of Steel Sculpture in Shropshire, England.

== Early life ==
Kitchin was born in Peterborough. When his father's confectionery business collapsed in 1936, the family relocated to Birmingham in the industrial West Midlands.

Kitchin completed his secondary education in the Quinton area of Birmingham and at the age of fourteen became an apprentice to the woodwork trade, specialising in joinery, constructing ammunitions boxes and correcting those of others that did not meet the stringent standards of the Ministry of Defence. It was whilst working as a joiner that he made his first attempts at carving the human figure. Reflecting on this early desire to carve, Kitchin has described how he chanced upon images of sculpture in the pages of the Encyclopædia Britannica his mother had bought for him to look at pictures of aircraft.

At the age of eighteen, with the Second World War in full momentum, Kitchin was conscripted to work in the coalmines as a ‘Bevin Boy’. Conditions in the mines proved particularly harsh and within only three days he went absent without leave. Following his eventual arrest and deportation to Ireland, Kitchin re-conscripted, putting his skills to use with the Royal Electrical and Mechanical Engineers with whom he served three years from 1945-48.

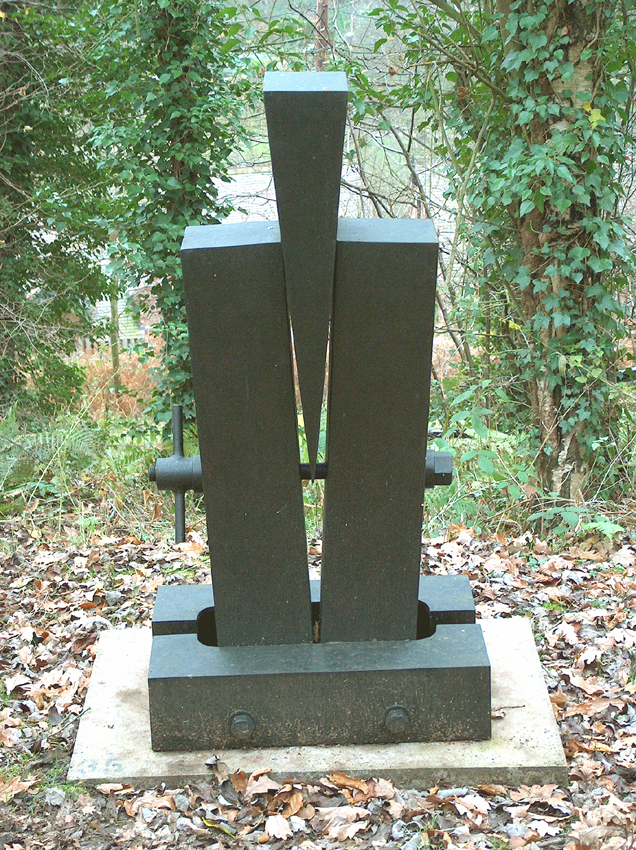
'Wedge and Columns', Roy Kitchin, 1964.

== Beginnings as a sculptor ==
Later, reflecting on this period of his life with the R.E.M.E., Kitchin acknowledged it had not been entirely wasted. He had learnt many skills and techniques that would prove useful for his sculpture. Following his military discharge in 1948 Kitchin became a student of sculpture at Birmingham School of Art and Design, lasting only until the end of the first term. In that short period at college the Head of Sculpture William Bloye was so impressed by Kitchin's abilities that he asked him to become his full-time assistant. Without the means to pay for the course Kitchin accepted the role. With Bloye, Kitchin gained experience working on large-scale sculptures and neo-classical architectural decoration.

In 1952 Kitchin re-enrolled to the Sculpture Department at Birmingham College of Art, paying his way through by completing small commissions from Bloye. Here he was encouraged to produce sculptures of figures from the Greek canon. Graduating in 1954, Kitchin soon found work as a freelance architectural sculptor, gaining several larger important commissions, including the complete re-carving of the decoration on Birmingham Cathedral Tower. The next six years proved particularly formative for Kitchin's practice. Seeing for the first time the work of Cubist sculptors such as Jacques Lipchitz and Ossip Zadkine demonstrated the creative possibilities of working in new and unfamiliar materials. Kitchin also recognised the efforts of Jacob Epstein to free artists from the control of patronage that, he felt, had historically restricted individual expressivity. Kitchin's figurative work in stone and clay gave way to a series of richly organic anthropomorphic sculptures in bronze.

In 1961 Kitchin was invited by the architectural stone carver Tom Wright to begin teaching in the sculpture department at Wolverhampton School of Art. At around this time Kitchin's work underwent a notable change: he began to use production techniques of heavy industrial technology and the first steel sculptures appeared. It was here too, three years later, in 1964 that Kitchin met his lifelong partner the sculptor Pam Brown. He would stay at Wolverhampton School of Art a further ten years.

In 1971 Kitchin and Brown relocated to the Fine Arts Department at Newcastle upon Tyne University. Soon he began to produce much large steel sculptures that were exhibited widely in open-air shows. In 1983 Kitchin's one-man exhibition, titled in his name, opened at the Yorkshire Sculpture Park.

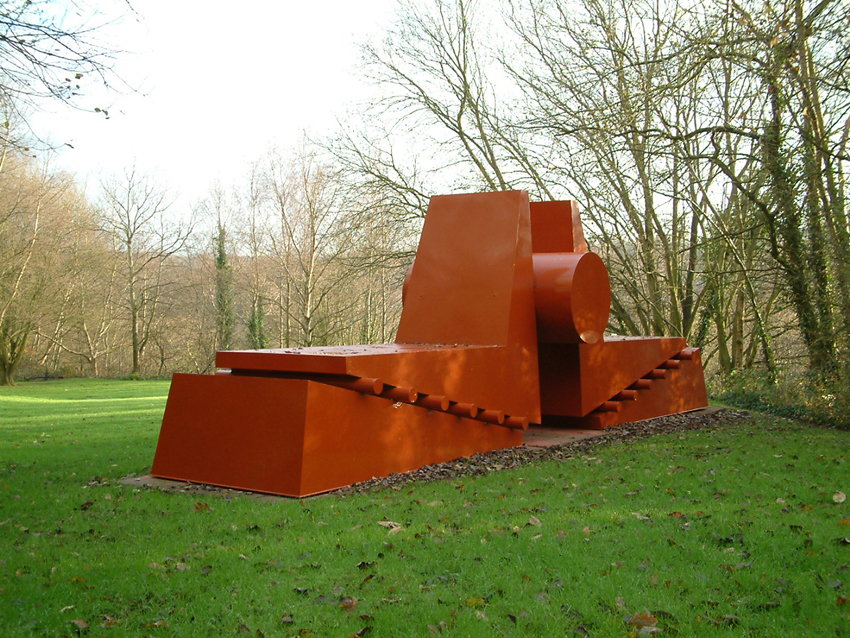
Inclined Impasse, Roy Kitchin, 1982.

In the early eighties Kitchin wished to find a permanent site for his sculptures. He wanted to know how the landscape and the sculpture's 'dialogue' would be affected by permanence.

In 1983 Kitchin left Newcastle to realise this ideal site for his sculpture: the Ironbridge Open Air Museum of Steel Sculpture at Coalbrookdale in Shropshire.

== Open Air Museum of Steel Sculpture ==
Kitchin co-founded the Open Air Museum of Steel Sculpture in Shropshire, England. For three years prior to this dramatic change Kitchin and Brown had invested considerable time in writing to organisations known to hold stocks of underused land. The letter proposed a simple exchange: use of the land in return for its upgrading and future maintenance. Encouraged by the positive responses received they decided to narrow the search to concentrate on the area of Shropshire known as the birthplace of the Industrial Revolution – Ironbridge. In 1986 Ironbridge Gorge was recognised by UNESCO for its ‘outstanding universal value’ and became a ‘World Heritage Site’.

This decision to concentrate on the Ironbridge area brought the couple into negotiation with Telford Development Corporation, a government body established to build the new town of Telford, who were then the biggest landowners in the district. Following four years of visiting sites to no avail, the perfect location was found in 1984. It was the right size parcel of land with suitable topographical features and a clearly defined boundary. Formerly, the site had been home to the Cherry Tree Hill Brick and Tile works, owned by Abraham Darby I’s Coalbrookdale Company until it folded in 1905.

Development of the site was delayed somewhat by construction of the Ironbridge Bypass on its north side. In the intervening period, however, the requisite planning approvals were obtained from the Department of the Environment, several old on-site mine shafts were capped and the museum was registered as a charitable trust. The necessary legal contracts between Telford Development Corporation and the Museum Trust were drawn and finally signed on 8 May 1989. Planning permissions were also granted to build a new house/studio, designed by Brown, on site.

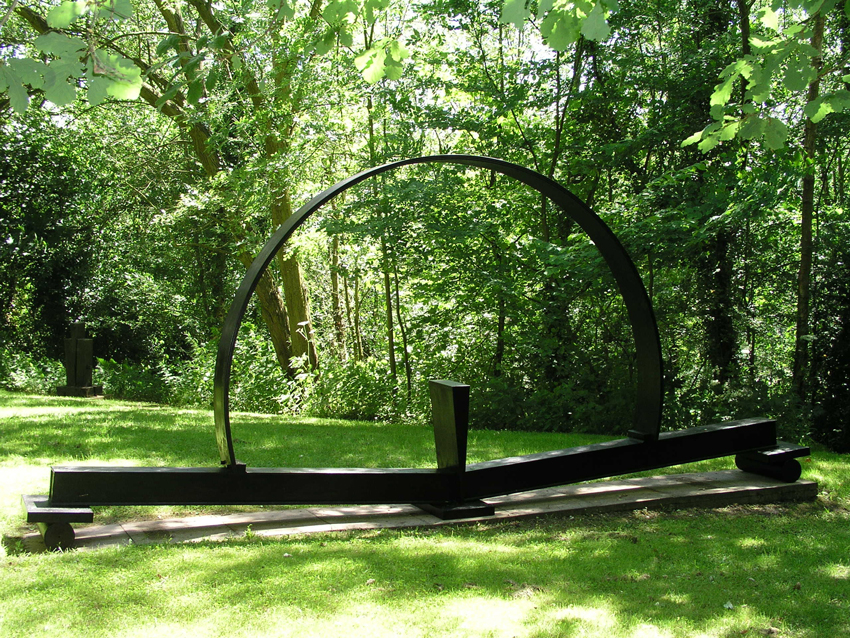
'Blake', Roy Kitchin, 1982.

The couple's view was that before any sculpture be installed it was necessary to see the site throughout the seasons in order to understand where best to locate works. In June 1991 the Ironbridge Open Air Museum of Steel Sculpture opened to the public, displaying 43 sculptures throughout its 10-acre setting, including work by Pam Brown, Rob Ward, Sarah Neville, Michael Lyons, Charles Hewlings, Harry Seager, Brian Thompson, Owen Cunningham and Brian Fell.

The collection continued to grow and the Museum housed over eighty sculptures by over thirty artists.

In the mid-2010s the museum was moved to the British Ironwork Centre at Aston near Oswestry on the A5 though still in Shropshire. A number of sculptures, in danger of being sold for scrap were saved by the Save a Sculpture program and are now located at the Sculpture Trails Outdoor Museum in Solsberry, Indiana, USA.

== Publications ==
- Roy Kitchin with Pamela Brown, ‘The Scunthorpe Project’, Leonardo, Vol,19, No.2, 1986
- Roy Kitchin with Pamela Brown, ‘On my Sculpture Influenced by the Industrial Revolution’, Leonardo, Vol.12, No.3, 1979
