= Wil Edmunds =

William Glyndwr "Wil" Edmunds OBE (born 1947) is a retired Welsh educationalist. He was Principal of Coleg Ceredigion and then Principal/Chief Executive of Deeside College 1997-2004, during which time the college was the first Further Education college to be awarded the Queen's Anniversary Prize. In 2004 he was appointed chair of ACCAC, the Qualifications, Curriculum and Assessment Authority for Wales.

Edmunds has a degree in music from Bretton Hall College, University of Leeds, and a master's degree in social psychology from the University of Liverpool. He received the OBE in 2001 for "services to Further Education".
