= West Bretton =

Village and civil parish in West Yorkshire, England

Coordinates: 53.619°N 1.567°W

- Village
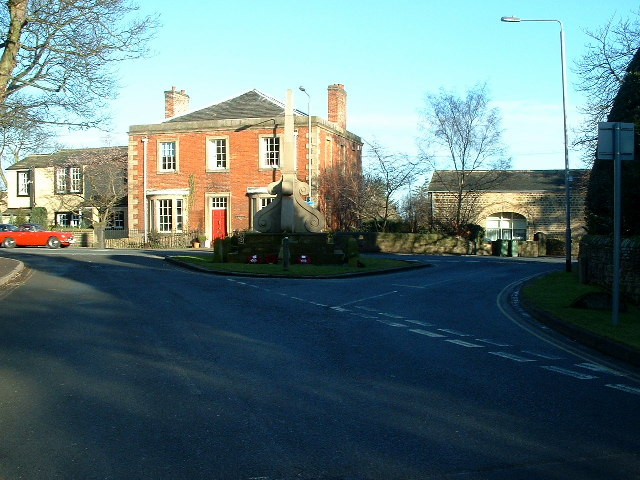
- War Memorial, West Bretton

- Location within West Yorkshire
- Population: 459 (2011)
- OS grid reference: SE285135
- Civil parish: West Bretton
- Metropolitan borough: City of Wakefield
- Metropolitan county: West Yorkshire
- Region: Yorkshire and the Humber
- Country: England
- Sovereign state: United Kingdom
- Post town: WAKEFIELD
- Postcode district: WF4
- Dialling code: 01924
- Police: West Yorkshire
- Fire: West Yorkshire
- Ambulance: Yorkshire

West Bretton is a village and civil parish in Wakefield, West Yorkshire, England. It lies close to junction 38 of the M1 motorway at Haigh. It has a population of 546, reducing to 459 at the 2011 Census.

There is a school in the village, West Bretton Junior and Infant School, and a church, which is an Anglican-Methodist local ecumenical partnership.

== History ==
=== Toponymy ===
Bretton derives from the Old English Brettas, the Britons and tūn meaning an enclosure, farmstead, village or estate. The Briton's farm or settlement was recorded as Bretone in the Domesday Book of 1086 and West Bretton in 1200.

=== Manor ===
This part of Yorkshire was laid waste in the Harrying of the North after the Norman conquest of England. Most of West Bretton was granted to the de Lacys, lords of the Honour of Pontefract by William I and a small part to the Manor of Wakefield. After the devastation, growth was slow but more land was eventually cultivated to sustain a growing population. A water-powered corn mill was recorded in 13th century and in 1379 there was a smith. The population at this time was approximately 70 people and one family had adopted the surname "de Bretton". The de Bretton, Dronfield and Wentworth families became pre-eminent and Sir Willian Dronfield held the manor when he died in 1406.

Swein de Bretton granted the right to pasture 200 cattle and sheep on land north of the village to the monks of Byland Abbey. The population suffered the effects of the Black Death in 1350. Richard Wentworth inherited the manor and hall in 1477. His great-grandson, Sir Thomas Wentworth was Henry VIII's Knight Marshall and keeper of Sandal Castle. An oak bed from this time, supposedly slept in by the king, is preserved at Temple Newsam. The old hall, on a different site to the present hall, was recorded on Christopher Saxton's Yorkshire map of 1577 but its exact location is unknown.

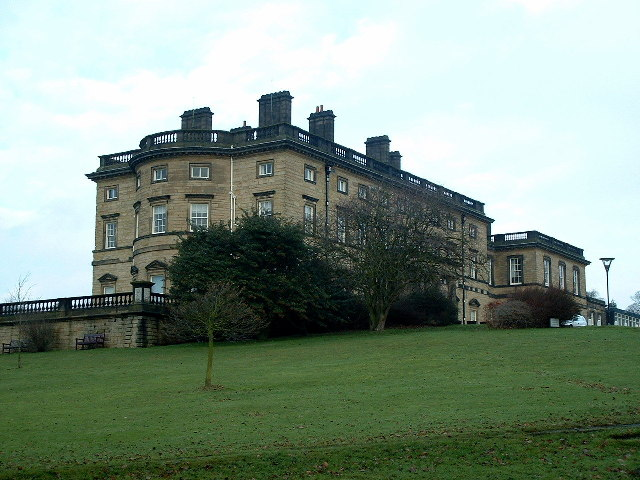
Bretton Hall

Thomas Wentworth fought with the Royalists in the English Civil War and was captured at the Battle of Naseby and his estates confiscated. His estates were returned and he was knighted in 1660 when the monarchy was restored. Bretton Hall was built by Sir William Wentworth who inherited the estate in 1706. He was a Captain of Horse in the Trained Guards in the Jacobite rising of 1745. He was buried in the park chapel. Sir Thomas Wentworth (1735–1792) transformed the parkland to what it is today. He changed his name to Blackett, his mother's name, when he inherited the Blackett fortune. He was unmarried but his illegitimate daughter Diana, wife of Lt Colonel Thomas Beaumont MP for Northumberland inherited the estate.

The Beaumonts' main residence was Bretton Hall and a considerable amount of money was spent on it during their time there. Their son Thomas Wentworth Beaumont was Liberal MP for seats in Stafford and Northumberland and supporter of the Reform Act 1832. His son Wentworth Blackett Beaumont spent more time in the north east where he owned more than 14,000 acres of land as well as the Bretton estate. He was ennobled as Baron Allendale of Allendale. His son Wentworth Canning Blackett Beaumont was MP for Hexham and a lord-in-waiting to George V. Wentworth Henry Canning Beaumont made Bretton his home. During the Second World War the hall was used by the military and maintenance cost rose leading to its sale to the West Riding County Council in 1947 followed by the estate land ten years later. The National Union of Mineworkers had wanted to turn it into a convalescent home.

=== Agriculture ===
The West Yorkshire Archaeological Society has documents relating to the three-field system that operated in the village in medieval times. Its fields were enclosed by 1759. Home Farm was built by 1800. Other farms were Town Farm and Manor Farm. Evidence of brewing is the old malt kiln at the farm of the same name.

=== Industry ===
After the dissolution of the monasteries Matthew Wentworth bought "all the myne, and delff of ironstone" around Bentley Grange, the Byland Abbey property. Though the ironstone was exhausted by the mid-1600s, smithies continued to operate fuelled by charcoal. The furnace at Bretton supplied pig iron to Colnebridge, Wortley Top Forge and Kirkstall in 1728. The furnace at Bretton was taken over by the Cockshutts of Wortley and pig iron was produced there in 1806 but the site had closed by 1820. Attempts were made to exploit coal which outcropped in Bretton but were small in scale. A mine was operated by Thomas Wood in 1806, Bretton Colliery managed by Tweedale and Watson paid rent to the estate in 1820s and bell pits, the Gate Royd Pits, (near the motorway service area) operated in 1849, The Jagger Brothers who owned Emley Colliery opened shafts on Malt Kiln Farm between 1856 and 1871.

Where millstone grit outcropped it was quarried, mostly between the 17th and 19th centuries and is the building stone for farmhouses and boundary walls. There was a brickworks producing rustic red bricks from fireclay outcrops near Bower Hill Lane. From 1723 until 1737 William Harrison who had moved from Burslem was making pots in the village.

== Governance ==
Historically part of the West Riding of Yorkshire, the chapelry of West Bretton was partly in the parish of Sandal Magna in the wapentake of Agbrigg and Morley and partly in the parish of Silkstone in the wapentake of Staincross. It became part of the Wakefield poor law union in 1837. West Bretton became part of Wakefield Rural District, created in 1894 and abolished 1974, when it became part of the City of Wakefield Metropolitan District Council.

== Geography ==
West Bretton covers 849 acres (344 ha) of hilly land from 122 to 152 metres (400 to 499 ft) above sea level. It is at the watershed of the Rivers Dearne and Calder. The River Dearne flows west to east through the landscaped valley in Bretton Park where it is dammed to form two lakes.

The underlying geology is that of the Carboniferous period and comprises 18 coal seams of coal measures and the Tankersley ironstone seam. Millstone grit outcrops were quarried for building stone and dry stone boundary walls.

West Bretton is on the A637 Barnsley to Huddersfield road, south west of the junction with the A636 Wakefield to Denby Dale road and close to the M1 motorway, which passes to the east of the village.

== Education ==
Sir Thomas Wentworth (who changed his name to Blackett) built a school sometime after he inherited the estate in 1763. Sir Thomas paid a schoolmaster £20 per year. It became a national school and was used as a Sunday School. In 1865–1866 it had 65 pupils and when education was made compulsory to the age of 13 in 1881 there were 100. West Bretton J & I School, with 89 pupils on roll aged from 3 to 11, occupies the original Grade II-listed school house.

Bretton Hall College opened in 1949 as a teacher training college, and specialist arts college of higher education. The college offered University of Leeds degrees and was later, subsequently affiliated to the University of Leeds but closed in their care in 2007.

== Religion ==
West Bretton was divided between the parishes of Sandal Magna and Silkstone and a chapel of ease was built by the Dronfields in 1358. St Bartholemew's Chapel was mentioned in a will of 1406. In 1744 the old chapel was replaced on a different site by the present Park Chapel which contained the Wentworth's family pew. It was given to the Diocese of Wakefield in 1959.

Methodism came to the village in 1811. A cottage, rented from the estate, was registered as a place of worship for Protestant Dissenters, Primitive Methodists in 1861. Methodists and Anglicans created a local ecumenical partnership, the Church in West Bretton, in 1982. It uses the mid-19th century Methodist premises.

== Yorkshire Sculpture Park ==
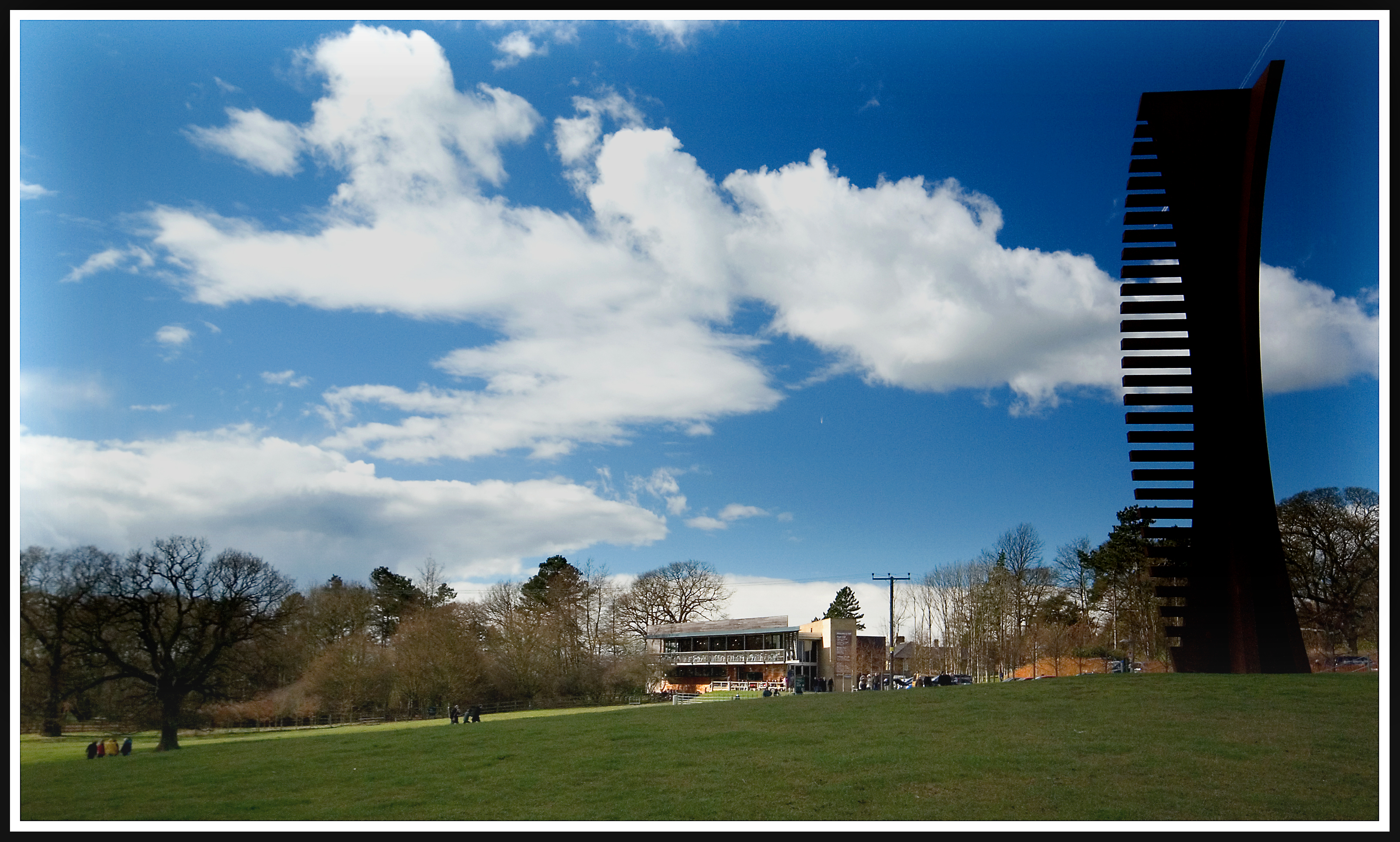
Yorkshire Sculpture Park entrance

The Yorkshire Sculpture Park consists of 200 acres (0.80 km^{2}) of landscaped ground with a large collection of sculptures including some by Elisabeth Frink, some by Auguste Rodin, and others by local sculptors Barbara Hepworth, born in Wakefield, and Henry Moore, born in Castleford.

== Sport ==
West Bretton Cricket Club on Park Lane and has two teams in the Pontefract & District Cricket League, in Divisions 2 and 5. The Sunday side plays in the Barnsley & District Sunday League, in Division 1. In 2007 the club celebrated its centenary year, and marked the occasion by inviting the former England wicket-keeper turned artist Jack Russell to visit the ground and paint a landscape of the pitch and clubhouse.

In 2021 West Bretton Football Club was founded by members of the cricket club. They play in the Barnsley & District Sunday League Division 1.

== See also ==
- Listed buildings in West Bretton
