= Bretton Hall, West Yorkshire =

Country house near Wakefield, England

Bretton Hall
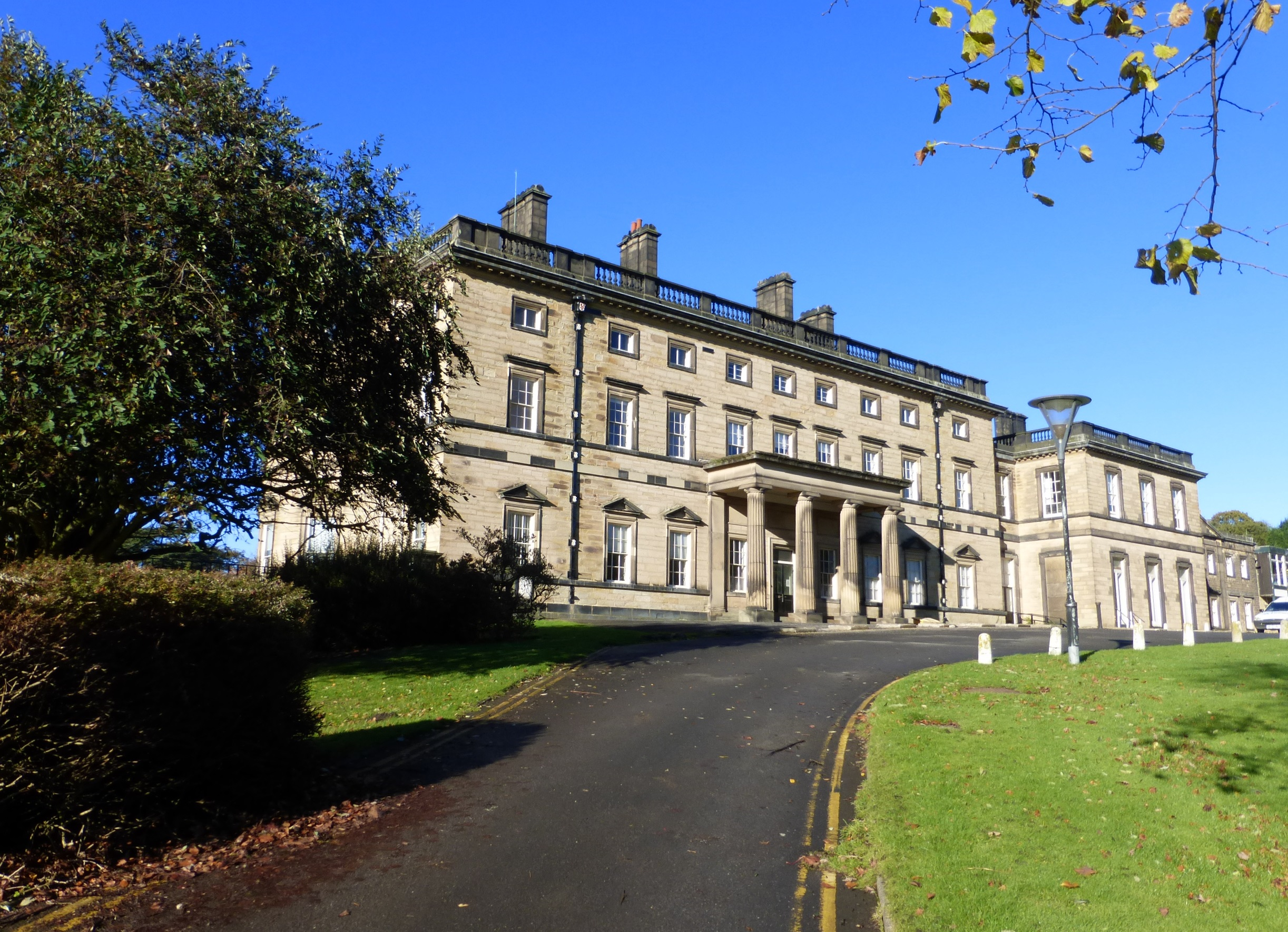
- Bretton Hall front
- Interactive map of the Bretton Hall area

General information
- Architectural style: Georgian
- Location: West Bretton, West Yorkshire, England
- Coordinates: 53.6107°N 1.5729°W
- Construction started: 1700
- Completed: 1852

Technical details
- Material: Sandstone ashlar

Listed Building – Grade II*
- Official name: Bretton Hall including attached orangery to west
- Designated: 14 February 1952
- Reference no.: 1184808

Bretton Hall is a country house in West Bretton near Wakefield, West Yorkshire, England. It housed Bretton Hall College from 1949 until 2001 and was a campus of the University of Leeds from 2001 to 2007. It is due to open as a second location of the Groucho Club in 2026. The hall is a Grade II* listed building.

== History ==
In the 14th century the Bretton estate was owned by the Dronsfields and passed by marriage to the Wentworths in 1407. King Henry VIII spent three nights in the old hall and furnishings, draperies and panelling from his bedroom were moved to the new hall. A hall is marked on Christopher Saxton's 1577 map of Yorkshire.

The present building was designed and built around 1720 by its owner, Sir William Wentworth, assisted by James Moyser, to replace the earlier hall. In 1792 it passed into the Beaumont family, latterly Barons and Viscounts Allendale, and the library and dining room were remodelled by John Carr in 1793. Monumental stables designed by George Basevi were built between 1842 and 1852. The hall was sold to the West Riding County Council in 1947. Before the sale, the panelling of the "Henry VIII parlour" (preserved from the earlier hall) was given to Leeds City Council and moved to Temple Newsam house.

The hall housed Bretton Hall College of Education from 1949 until 2001 and was a campus of the University of Leeds from 2001 to 2007.

Plans to convert the hall to a hotel and offices were submitted for planning approval and were approved in April 2013.

In 2024 it was reported that the Groucho Club, a private members' club and renowned for its celebrity clientele, is set to open a new venue at Bretton Hall in 2026; marking its first permanent location outside London in the club's 39-year history.

== Architecture ==
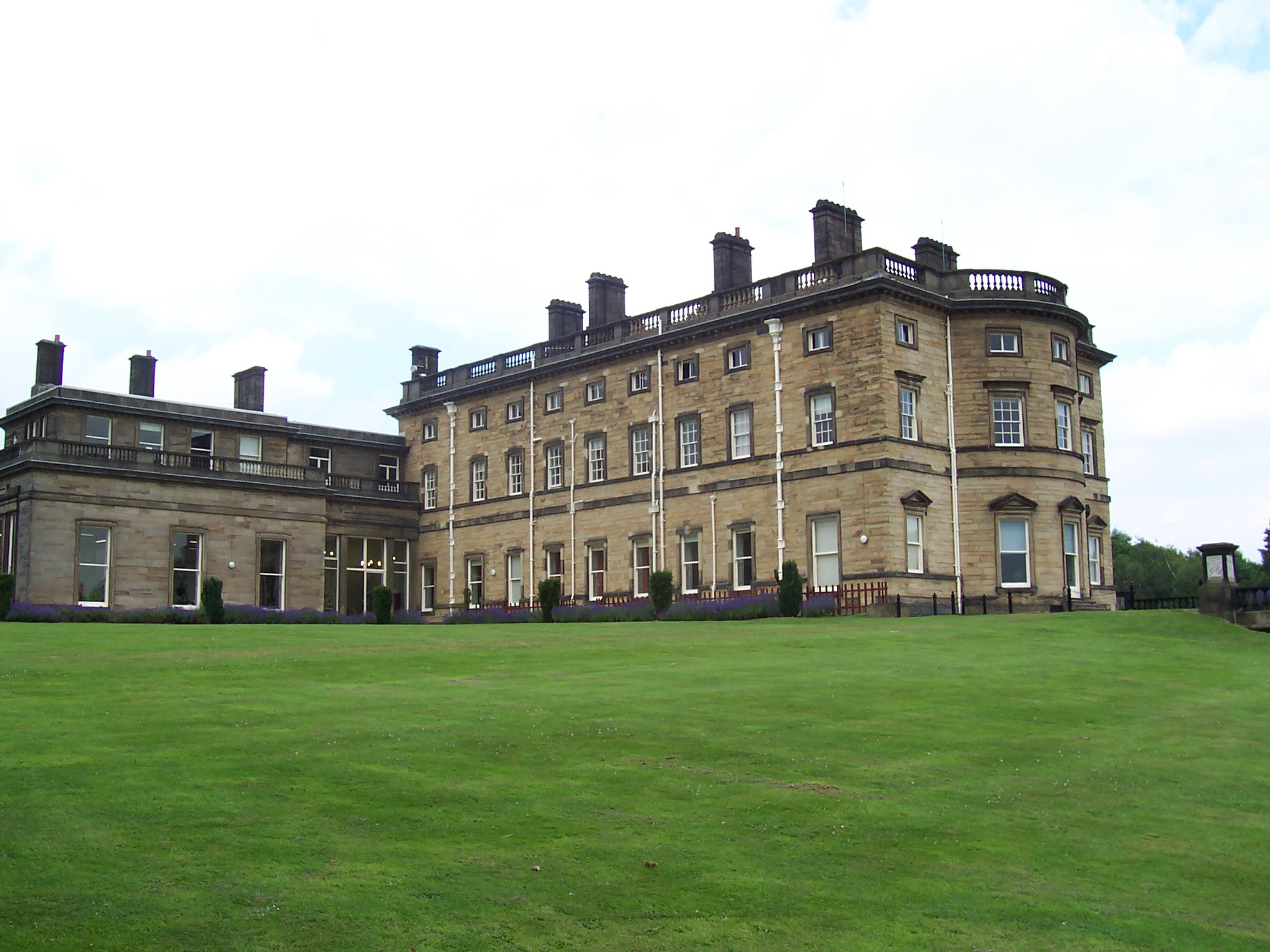
Bretton Hall's south range

The oldest part of the house, the south range, dates from about 1720 and was designed by the owner, Sir William Wentworth and Colonel James Moyser. It was enlarged when the north range was added in the 1780s by William Lindley of Doncaster. A bow window and portico were added to the south range and the block linking the two ranges was remodelled between 1811 and 1814 by Jeffrey Wyatt for Colonel Thomas and Diana Beaumont. Around 1852 Thomas Richardson added the projecting dining room on the house's east front for Thomas Blackett Beaumont.

=== Exterior ===
The house has a three-storey nine-bay by five-bay main range while the rest is two storeys high. It is built in sandstone ashlar and its roof is hidden behind a balustraded parapet. It has tall ornamental chimney stacks and the Wentworth shield decorates two ornamental rainwater heads. The south range has a symmetrical facade with a central Doric portico. The ground and first-floor windows have 12-pane sashes with triangular pediments to the ground floor and cornices to the first. The shorter second floor windows have casements added later. The south front has a three-bay bow window with tall ground-floor windows. The centre window was originally a doorway accessed by a flight of four steps.

The seven-bay north range has a symmetrical facade where the three centre bays have giant pilasters supporting a pediment. Either side of central eight-panel double door are 12-pane sash windows while the first-floor has nine-pane sash windows. A three-bay link block joins the ranges and terminates in the orangery. The orangery is built on a two-step podium. Its seven bays are divided by square Tuscan piers which support the frieze, cornice and blocking course.

=== Interior ===
The entrance hall to the south range has a groin vaulted passage with three arches and piers and its walls are decorated with grisaille paintings. Its main staircase has a wrought iron handrail. On either side the old billiard room and former breakfast room have Adam style ceilings from about 1770. The link range has an entrance vestibule with four piers supporting a glazed dome on pendentives. On the first floor the vestibule opens onto the half-landing of the south range's main staircase. The old drawing room has a Baroque ceiling with pendant bosses. The former library and music room were in the Regency style of the 1811–14 extensions. The library had an apse where there was an organ, a coved ceiling with rinceau decoration, and a marble fireplace. The dining room was decorated in the Rococo style in about 1852. It has an elaborate marble fireplace and frieze and its ceiling is decorated with musical instruments.

== Park and gardens ==
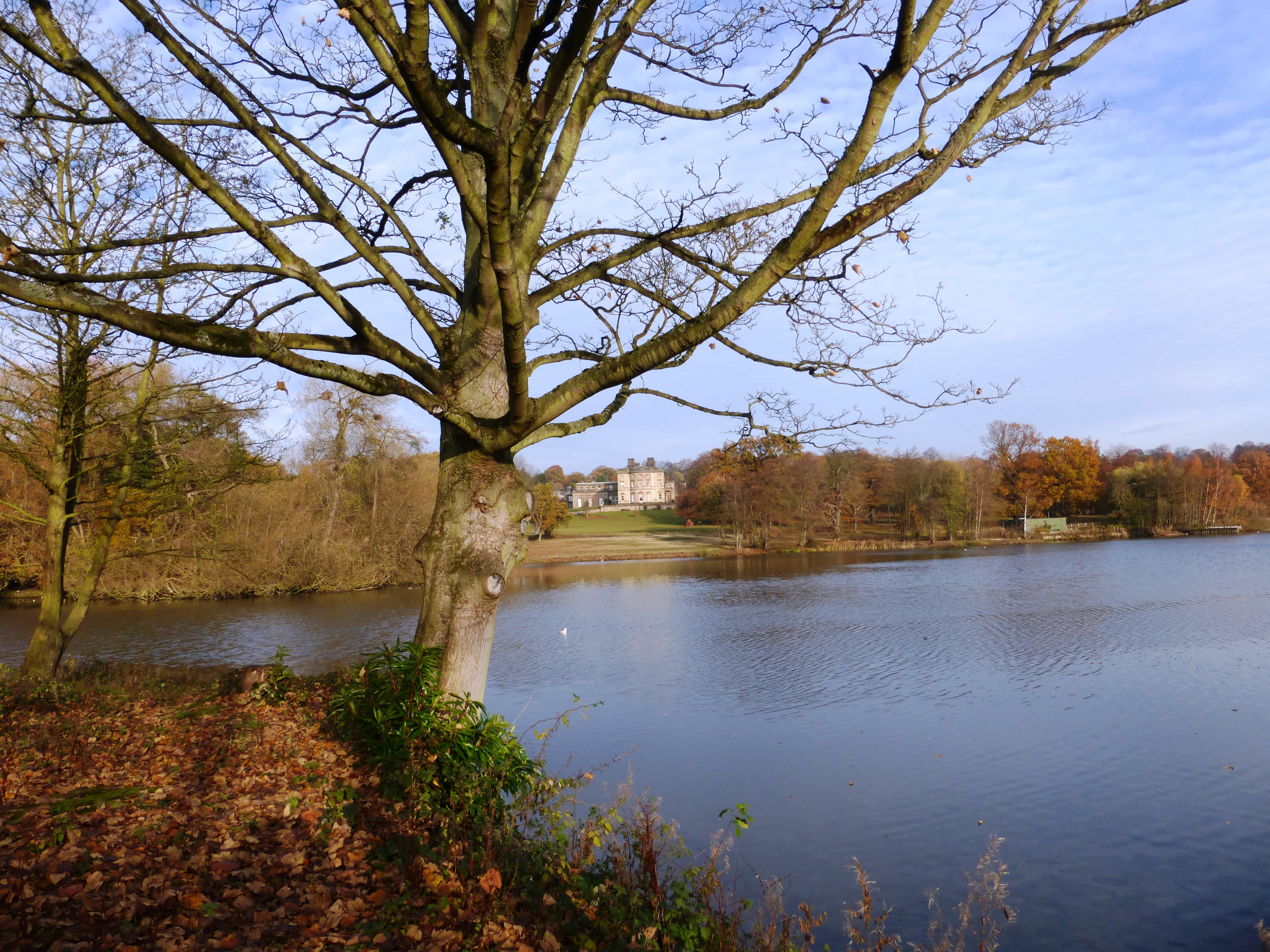
Bretton Hall, lower lake and parkland

The pleasure grounds and parkland around the hall were the work of landscape gardeners Richard Woods in the 18th century and Robert Marnock, the estate's head gardener, in the 1820s and 1830s. The hall overlooks the River Dearne, which flows in an easterly direction through the parkland. The river is dammed to form two lakes. Oxley Bank, a linear earthwork, forms the park's eastern boundary.

Within and around the Grade II listed parkland and pleasure grounds are several historic structures. Four lodges stand at the estate's main entrances. North Lodge and the Grade II listed Haigh Lodge were probably designed by Jeffrey Wyattville at the same time as his 1811–14 extensions at the hall. Archway Lodge, a Grade II* listed building by William Atkinson in 1805 takes the form of a giant archway with fluted columns. The extensively altered Hoyland Lodge is on Litherop Lane to the south. The redundant Grade II* listed St Bartholomew's Chapel, West Bretton built by William Wentworth in 1744 has been restored as gallery space.

The parkland is the home of the 224-acre (91 ha) Yorkshire Sculpture Park and the 100-acre (40 ha) Bretton Country Park which has been a designated local nature reserve since 1994. The development of accommodation and car parks for the college and multiple use as a country and sculpture park and general neglect in the second half of the 20th century led to the historic landscape's fragmentation and it was designated "at risk" by English Heritage in 2009. Yorkshire Sculpture Park is now responsible for most of the park and, in partnership with Natural England, who provided funding, and English Heritage, has a conservation management plan for the park. Trees and scrub have been cleared to provide access to a lakeside perimeter walk.

== See also ==
- Grade II* listed buildings in West Yorkshire
- Listed buildings in West Bretton
