= Bretton Hall College of Education =

Former college in West Yorkshire, England

Coordinates: 53.6107°N 1.5729°W

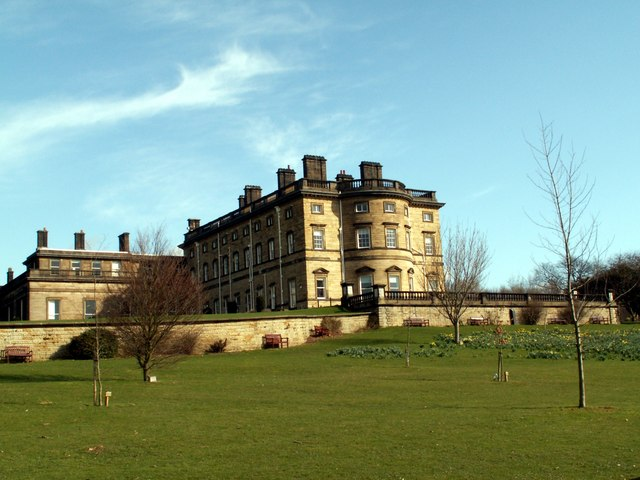
Bretton Hall (2007), shortly before closure of the campus

Bretton Hall College of Education was a higher-education college in West Bretton in the West Riding of Yorkshire, England, United Kingdom. It opened as a teacher-training college in 1949 with awards from the University of Leeds. The college merged with the University of Leeds in 2001 and the campus closed in 2007.

== History ==
In 1949, Bretton Hall College, a teacher-training college founded by Alec Clegg specialising in innovative courses in design, music and the visual and performance arts, opened in the historic Bretton Hall in West Bretton, Yorkshire. It became an affiliated college of the University of Leeds, which validated its degrees.

The college had financial difficulties, and, with the support of the Higher Education Funding Council for England (HEFCE), merged with the University of Leeds in August 2001. Most of the music, fine-art and teacher-training courses were moved to the Leeds campus, but visual and performing-arts education and creative writing remained at the Bretton site, which became home to the university's School of Performance and Cultural Industries.

In December 2004, the university's governing body reversed an earlier decision and decided that the Bretton Hall site was not financially viable, and the School of Performance and Cultural Industries should move to the main university campus in summer 2007, allowing all existing Bretton-based students to complete their studies there. The closure was documented on the BBC website by student Clair Parker.

In June 2006, it was announced that Bretton Hall was to be sold to Wakefield Council. On 3 May 2007, John Godber presented Final Curtain, a documentary on Bretton Hall, broadcast on BBC Radio 4. On 5 and 6 May 2007, a reunion was organised for the alumni and students of Bretton Hall between 1947 and 2007 as a celebration of the school's contribution to the arts industry and also the academic excellence it produced over sixty years.

In November 2007, it was announced that Bretton Hall would be developed as a luxury hotel and spa.

The Yorkshire Sculpture Park (YSP) was founded in the college parkland by Bretton Hall lecturer Peter Murray, CBE. YSP has become a leading international art centre for art and performance in the landscape. When the college closed, YSP took over the estate grounds and lakes.

In May 2013, a series of visits to the former hostels (halls of residence) was co-organised by Wakefield Council, YSP, the developer Rushbond and Bretton Hall alumni. Photographs were taken of every hostel room. A further event was organised in September 2013 to visit the mansion. Rushbond will ensure that a complete photographic record will be taken of the building before refurbishment.

== Notable alumni ==
- Ian Boldsworth
- Jon Clark (lighting designer)
- Kevin Clarke (writer)
- Anne Collins
- Shelley Conn
- Natasia Demetriou
- Wil Edmunds
- Beatie Edney
- Michael Fentiman
- Emma Fryer
- Mark Gatiss
- John Godber
- Esther Hall
- Carla Henry
- Adrian Howells
- Roger Hutchinson
- Christine Kavanagh
- Jonathan Kerrigan
- Louisa Leaman
- Simon Lightwood
- Bhavna Limbachia
- Tom Lorcan
- Kate McGregor
- Wayne McGregor
- Kay Mellor
- Richard O'Brien
- Ray Peacock
- Steve Pemberton
- David Rappaport
- Sir Ken Robinson
- Stuart Semple
- Reece Shearsmith
- The Research
- Mark Thomas
- Chris T-T
- Colin Welland
- Gillian Wright
