= St Bartholomew's Chapel, West Bretton =

Church building in West Bretton, West Yorkshire, England

Coordinates: 53.611°N 1.563°W

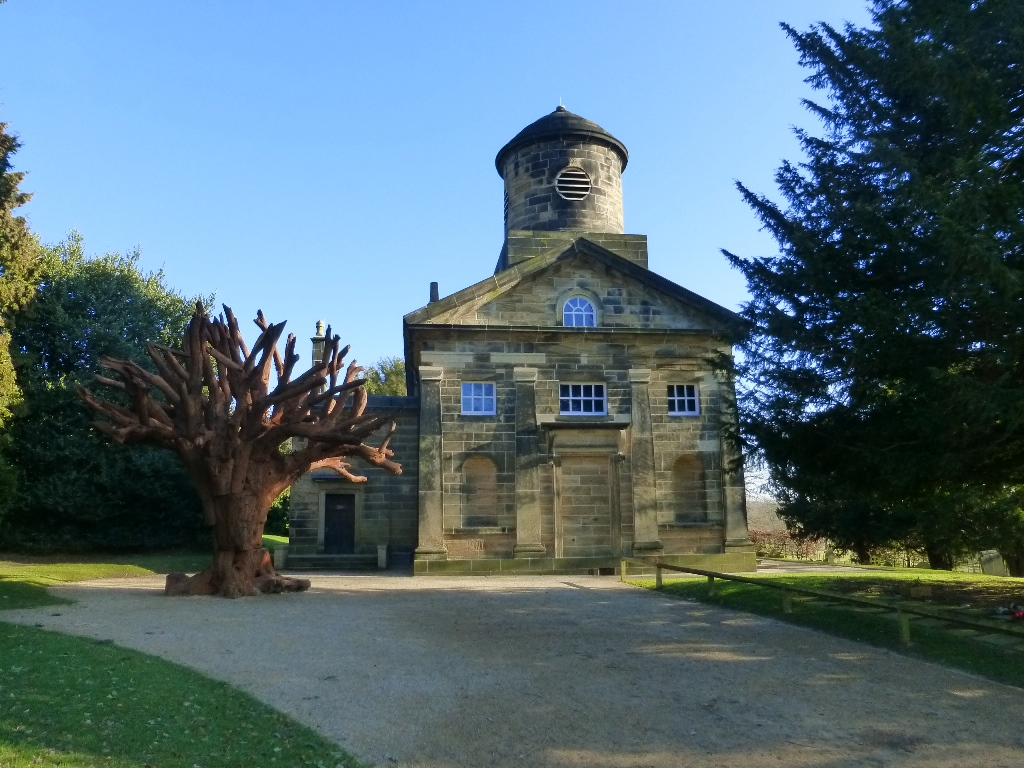
Restored chapel in Yorkshire Sculpture Park and Iron Tree sculpture by Ai Weiwei

St Bartholomew's Chapel is a former estate church in the grounds of Bretton Hall, in West Bretton near Wakefield in West Yorkshire, England. The redundant Grade II* listed chapel has been restored as gallery space for the Yorkshire Sculpture Park.

== History ==
From medieval times West Bretton was partly in the parishes of Silkstone and Sandal Magna and because of its distance from the churches had a chapel of ease. The original chapel was "drowned" when the upper lake was created. It was replaced on a site to the east of the new mansion by the estate chapel dedicated to St Bartholomew by Sir William Wentworth in 1744. The chapel was built with money from Wentworth's wealthy wife, Diana Blackett. Several members of the Wentworth family are buried there including Sir William Wentworth in 1763 and his son Thomas Wentworth-Blackett in 1792. When Bretton Hall was sold to the West Riding County Council in 1949 for use as a teacher training college, the chapel was used as rehearsal space for drama students. The Yorkshire Sculpture Park bought the chapel with Heritage Lottery funding and used it as a music venue and exhibition space. The chapel was closed for renovation in 2013 and reopened the following year.

== Architecture ==
The church, in the Classical style, is built of ashlar sandstone. It has a five-bay nave and a chancel under its stone slate roof. The symmetrical west front's three bays are framed and separated by giant Tuscan pilasters with an exaggerated entasis. The centre bay contains a blind doorway with niches in the bays at either side and above them, sash windows of six, eight and six lights. The tympanum in the pediment contains a round-arched window. The chapel's bell chamber is cylindrical with round, louvred openings and a domed top.

== Exhibitions ==
The first exhibition in the renovated former chapel was a recreation of Ai Weiwei's Fairytale-1001 Chairs. His Iron Tree sculpture stood outside.
