= Listed buildings in West Bretton =

West Bretton is a civil parish in the metropolitan borough of the City of Wakefield, West Yorkshire, England. The parish contains 40 listed buildings that are recorded in the National Heritage List for England. Of these, four are listed at Grade II*, the middle of the three grades, and the others are at Grade II, the lowest grade. The parish contains the village of West Bretton and the surrounding area, much of which is occupied by Bretton Park, the grounds of the country house, Bretton Hall. The hall is listed, together with a number of associated buildings, and structures in the park. The other listed buildings include houses, cottages and associated structures, farmhouses and farm buildings, a well head and a niche for a water pump, a church and associated structures, a school, a former mill building, a sculpture, and four mileposts.

== Key ==
Grade	Criteria
II*	Particularly important buildings of more than special interest
II	Buildings of national importance and special interest

== Buildings ==
Name and location	Photograph	Date	Notes	Grade
Barn northwest of Bullcliffe Farmhouse; 53.63628°N 1.56357°W	—	16th century	The barn is timber framed, later encased in stone, and it has a stone slate roof. There are four bays and a rear aisle. On the front is a cart entry with a cambered timber lintel and brick infill above, and two doors.	II
Barn southwest of Bullcliffe Farmhouse; 53.63586°N 1.56370°W	—	16th century	The barn is timber framed, later encased in stone and brick, and it has a stone slate roof. There are six bays and a rear aisle. In the front and rear are opposing cart entries, and in the left return are exposed timber framing and blocked vents.	II
Bretton Hall and orangery 53.61069°N 1.57274°W		c. 1720	A large country house, later used for other purposes. The initial design was partly by its owner, Sir William Wentworth, and there were later additions and alterations by architects including William Lindley, William Atkinson and Jeffry Wyatville. The house is built in stone, the main range has three storeys, and elsewhere are two storeys. The main front is symmetrical with nine bays, it is on a plinth, and has bands, a modillion eaves cornice, and a balustraded parapet. In the centre is a Greek Doric tetrastyle portico, and the windows are sashes, in the ground floor with triangular pediments and in the middle floor with cornices. The left return contains a three-storey bow window. To the right is a three-bay link to a seven-bay north range and an orangery. The orangery was designed by George Basevi, and has a two-step podium, and seven bays divided by Doric piers supporting a frieze, a moulded cornice, and a blocking course.	II*
Town well 53.61684°N 1.56939°W		1742	The well head is in stone, with a brick vaulted roof, a single storey, and a rectangular plan. On the front is a gable with moulded coping and kneelers, and a doorway with a dated lintel. The side walls form a parapet.	II
Church in Bretton Park; 53.61182°N 1.56390°W		1744	The church, designed by Sir William Wentworth, is in stone with a stone slate roof. It consists of a five-bay nave and chancel, and a two-bay organ chamber on the north. The west end has three bays separated by giant Tuscan pilasters, carrying a moulded band beneath a pediment containing a round-arched window in the tympanum. In the centre is a blind doorway with a moulded architrave, and a pediment on console brackets, flanked by niches, above which are sash windows. On the roof is a cylindrical bell chamber on a square base with a dome. Along the side is a plinth, bands, a moulded eaves cornice, two doorways, one of which is blind, and three windows. At the east end is a Tuscan Venetian window and marble memorial tablets.	II*
Wall, gateways and gates, Church in Bretton Park; 53.61178°N 1.56348°W		c. 1744	The walls enclose the churchyard on the west, south and east sides, and are in stone, with coping and iron railings. On the south side the wall forms a ha-ha. The gate piers are square and in stone, with moulded bases and broad flat moulded caps, and the gates are in iron.	II
The Pheasantries; 53.61189°N 1.56289°W		1749	A house in Bretton Park near the church, probably designed by Sir William Wentworth, it is in stone with quoins, and a hipped stone slate roof. There are two storeys, a symmetrical front of five bays, the middle three bays projecting under a pediment with a sundial in the tympanum, and a later rear extension. In the centre is a giant Venetian window; the other windows are casements, with most of the former mullions removed. The outer bays contain doorways, and at the rear is an entrance with a quoined surround and a dated and initialled lintel.	II
Maltkiln Farmhouse; 53.62032°N 1.56419°W	—	Mid-18th century	The farmhouse is in stone, rendered at the rear, with quoins, and a stone slate roof. There are two storeys, a front range of two bays, and a parallel shorter range at the rear. The doorway has a deep lintel, and the windows are sashes.	II
Cascade Bridge and weir 53.60775°N 1.57694°W		c. 1765	The bridge crosses the water between the Upper and Lower Lake in Bretton Park. It is in stone and consists of a flat span on short piers, above which is a string course on which is a series of sunk panels separated by piers. The railings are in iron and have panels with a geometric design and urn finials, and at the ends curve to end at small stone piers. The weir is stepped and curves at the ends.	II
Bretton Lodge; 53.61746°N 1.56705°W	—	Late 18th century	A brick house with stone dressings, bands, an eaves cornice, and a stone slate roof with coped gables. There are two storeys, a symmetrical front of three bays, and a two-bay extension to the right. In the centre is a distyle Tuscan portico and a doorway with a fanlight, above which is a sash window, and over that is a full-width pediment containing a Diocletian window. The outer bays contain two-storey canted bay windows.	II
Bridge over the east end of the Cut, Bretton Park; 53.60913°N 1.56337°W		Late 18th century	The hump-backed bridge is in stone with three round arches, each with moulding and a decorative frieze. There are triangular cutwaters, vermiculated panels at the springing of the arches, and similar oval panels in the spandrels. At the base of the parapet is a band with a Vitruvian scroll. On the bridge are intermediate piers, and at the ends are octagonal piers, each surmounted by a large urn with a fluted base and a gadrooned cap.	II
Barn and farm building, Maltkiln Farm; 53.62063°N 1.56409°W	—	Late 18th century	The barn and attached farm building are in stone, with quoins, and a stone slate roof with coped gables and moulded kneelers. There are two storeys and five bays. The buildings contain segmental-arched cart entries and slit vents. External steps lead up to an upper floor doorway.	II
The School House; 53.62064°N 1.56806°W	—	Late 18th century	The school is in red brick with a stone slate roof. It consists of a centre pedimented block with two storeys, and single-storey three-bay wings. In the middle bay of the centre block is a recessed round arch, the doorway with a rectangular fanlight is in the right bay, all the windows on the front have flat arches, and at the rear is a round-arched stair window.	II
Overflow, weirs and pump house 53.60858°N 1.56302°W		c. 1782	The overflow and three weirs at the end of Lower Lake, Bretton Park, are in stone. The overflow runs through a tunnel-vaulted skew bridge to join the middle weir. The weirs are stepped and concave. The pump house, dating from the 19th century, is in stone with quoins, a brick-lined internal wall, and a stone slate roof, and it contains an iron-spoked waterwheel.	II
84–96 Huddersfield Road; 53.62150°N 1.56936°W	—	c. 1790	A row of seven cottages, in red brick with stone dressings on a plinth, and with a slate roof. There are two storeys, and on the front are three canted bay windows. The other windows vary: some are sashes, some are casements, and others have been replaced.	II
25, 27 and 29 Huddersfield Road; 53.61854°N 1.56782°W	—	Late 18th or early 19th century	A house, later divided, it is rendered, and has stone slate roofs with coped gables and moulded kneelers. The central part has two storeys and three bays, with the gable end facing the road. In the middle bay is a recessed round-headed arch, and the windows are sashes. Flanking it are single-storey four-bay wings with hipped roofs, containing porches and casement windows with cambered heads.	II
Bretton Mill; 53.60530°N 1.55503°W	—	Late 18th or early 19th century	The mill building, later used for other purposes, is in stone with a stone slate roof. There are three storeys and three bays. In the centre, steps led up to a doorway with a quoined surround. The windows either have a single light, or two lights with a mullion.	II
Barn northwest of Estate House; 53.61798°N 1.56637°W	—	Late 18th or early 19th century	The barn, later used for other purposes, is in stone, with quoins, a stone slate roof, and seven bays. On the front is an elliptical-arched cart entry and an opposing entry at the rear. Also on the front is a doorway with flanking windows, stone steps leading up to a first floor doorway, and two square pitching holes.	II
Stable range, Maltkiln Farm; 53.62042°N 1.56400°W	—	Late 18th or early 19th century	The former stable range to the east of the farmhouse is in stone, with quoins, and a hipped stone slate roof. It contains two doorways, three windows, and a square pitching hole.	II
Archway Lodge and walls, Bretton Park; 53.61407°N 1.56404°W		1804	The lodge, designed by William Atkinson, is in stone, with two storeys and three bays. In the centre is a large round-headed archway flanked by fluted Roman Doris columns carrying an entablature and a blocking course. Each outer bay contains a sash window in the ground floor, and above is a limestone panel with a relief carving. The gates are in iron, and there is a small low wing on each side. The flanking walls sweep forward and end in square piers. Within the archway is a doorway on each side.	II*
North Lodge; 53.61499°N 1.57347°W	—	c. 1811	A lodge to Bretton Hall, it is in stone with deep oversailing eaves and a pyramidal Welsh slate roof. There is a single storey, and sides of three bays, with pilasters between the bays. In the centre of each front is a doorway with a moulded architrave, and the windows are sashes. There is a sunk panel over each opening.	II
Terrace and ha-ha south of Bretton Hall; 53.61034°N 1.57291°W	—	1811–14 (probable)	The terrace retaining walls on the south of the hall are in vermiculated stone, and have end buttresses. The balustrade has vase balusters and a moulded rail. It contains square piers with sunk panels and flat moulded caps decorated with acanthus carving, the larger main piers have limestone panels containing relief carvings. The retaining wall continues to the west as a ha-ha.	II
Camellia House; 53.61150°N 1.57465°W		1814	The building in the grounds of Bretton Hall was designed by Jeffry Wyatville. It is in stone and glass, and has a symmetrical plan with sides of one and seven bays, and a diagonally projecting bay at each corner. The walls are in glass with stone pillars, carrying an entablature and blocking course, and the corner bays have engaged Tuscan columns. The roof is in glass and is hipped.	II
24 and 26 Huddersfield Road; 53.61815°N 1.56674°W		Early 19th century (probable)	Two houses with stone slate roofs and two storeys. No. 24 to the right is in brick with stone dressings, quoins, a moulded eaves cornice, a pyramidal roof, and sides of three bays. The central doorway has a moulded architrave and a rectangular fanlight. It is flanked by bow windows, and in the upper floor are sash windows. No. 26 is recessed on the left, it is lower and rendered, with two bays, a doorway with a quoined surround in a porch on the right, and sash windows.	II
32 Huddersfield Road and workshop 53.61819°N 1.56627°W	—	Early 19th century	A house and workshop in one range, in stone, with quoins, a stone slate roof, and two storeys. The workshop range to the left contains an elliptical-arched cart entrance with a quoined surround, and windows with sliding sashes. On the front is a plaque with carving in relief. The house has two bays, and most of the windows are casements.	II
Summer house, Bretton Park; 53.60839°N 1.57954°W	—	Early 19th century (probable)	The summer house is in stone, with stuccoed brick infill at the rear, a semicircular plan, a flat roof, and a podium of two steps. Four Roman Doric columns and two square engaged piers support the entablature and blocking course, and there are two pairs of columns at the rear.	II
Terrace north of Bretton Hall; 53.61392°N 1.57164°W	—	Early to mid-19th century (probable)	The terrace has a long range and contains three flights of steps, with intermediate square buttresses, two of which have a blind round-arched recess. It has a balustrade with a moulded rail.	II
Bridge over the Cut north of Cascade Bridge; 53.60829°N 1.57710°W		Early to mid-19th century (probable)	The bridge in Bretton Park is in cast iron and consists of a single span on eight arched girders. On the bridge are iron railings on a moulded base, and have fleur de lis finials.	II
Gardener's cottage, walls, and sheds 53.61488°N 1.57095°W		Early to mid-19th century	The cottage and sheds are in stone with Welsh slate roofs, hipped on the cottage. The cottage has a single storey, five bays, the middle bay projecting and rusticated, and above is a balustraded parapet. In the middle bay is a doorway, and the outer bays contain sash windows. The flanking walls are in red brick, and curve forwards. The sheds form a range at the rear of the walls, and have a plinth, a moulded cornice and a blocking course.	II
Estate House; 53.61770°N 1.56591°W		c. 1840	The former office for the Bretton Estate, it is in stone with a Welsh slate roof. There are two storeys, three bays, and two rear wings, one with two storeys and one with one storey. On the front, the middle bay is recessed with a gable containing a quatrefoil. There are octagonal buttresses that rise to pinnacles flanking the middle bay and on the corners. In the middle bay is a doorway with a pointed arch and flanking lights, all under a hood mould, and the windows above and in the outer bays are sashes with hood moulds. The rear wings have coped gables with kneelers.	II
Walls, gateways and railings, Estate House; 53.61764°N 1.56607°W	—	c. 1840	The low walls run along the front of the garden. They are in stone with moulded coping, and carry iron railings with leaf-like finials. Along the walls are seven square gate piers with moulded caps, and at the ends are taller sections of wall without railings.	II
Stable Range, Bretton Hall; 53.61182°N 1.57266°W	—	1842–45	The main range was designed by George Basevi, and the quadrangle was completed in 1853. It is in rusticated stone, with clasping buttresses on the corners, moulded bands, a full entablature and a blocking course. There are two storeys, a symmetrical front of nine bays, and three bays on the sides. The central bay contains a giant round arch flanked by paired giant engaged columns with bands of vermiculation. The ground floor windows have round heads and are in recessed panels, and the upper floor windows have flat heads. The centre of the courtyard is surmounted by a dome with scrolls, containing a clock, and flanked by cartouches with coats of arms. At the rear is a colonnade along the whole front.	II*
Dairy attached to Home Farmhouse; 53.61641°N 1.57016°W		Mid-19th century	The former dairy is in stone with a pyramidal stone slate roof. There is a single storey, an octagonal plan, and a wing attaching it to the farmhouse. In the wing is an arched doorway with a chamfered surround, and there are windows in the wing and in alternate faces of the dairy. On the roof is a lead ventilator.	II
Sculpture, Virginius and his Daughter; 53.61380°N 1.57039°W	—	Mid-19th century	The sculpture, by Patrick MacDowell, is in marble on a small round plinth. It depicts a warrior holding a dead woman on one arm.	II
Water pump niche 53.61670°N 1.56897°W	—	Mid-19th century (probable)	The niche for a water pump is in a wall by the roadside. It is in stone, and has a round arch with a dropped keystone and moulded coping. At the rear is a square recess for the pump mechanism, and the pump has gone.	II
Haigh Lodge; 53.60744°N 1.55535°W		c. 1860	A lodge to Bretton Hall, it is in stone with deep oversailing eaves and a pyramidal Welsh slate roof. There is a single storey, and sides of three bays, with pilasters between the bays. In the centre of each front is a doorway with a moulded architrave, and the windows are casements. There is a sunk panel over each opening.	II
Milepost south of West Bretton traffic island 53.62398°N 1.57705°W		Mid- to late 19th century	The milepost is in stone with cast iron overlay, and has a triangular plan, and a rounded top. The top is inscribed with "BARNSLEY & GRANGEMOOR ROAD" and "BRETTON WEST", and on the sides are the distances to Barnsley, Huddersfield, and Bretton.	II
Milepost south of Park Road junction 53.61362°N 1.56211°W		Mid- to late 19th century	The milepost is in stone with cast iron overlay, and has a triangular plan, and a rounded top. The top is inscribed with "BARNSLEY & GRANGEMOOR ROAD" and "BRETTON WEST", and on the sides are the distances to Barnsley, Huddersfield, and Bretton.	II
Milepost northeast of West Bretton traffic island 53.62975°N 1.56654°W		Mid- to late 19th century	The milepost is in stone with cast iron overlay, and has a triangular plan, and a rounded top. The top is inscribed with "WAKEFIELD & DENBY DALE ROAD" and "BRETTON WEST", and on the sides are the distances to Wakefield and Denby Dale.	II
Milepost west of West Bretton traffic island 53.62171°N 1.58722°W		Mid- to late 19th century	The milepost is in stone with cast iron overlay, and has a triangular plan, and a rounded top. The top part of the cast iron is missing and on the sides are the distances to Wakefield and Denby Dale.	II
