= Peter Murray (arts administrator) =

Sir Peter Edward Murray CBE is the founder and executive director of Yorkshire Sculpture Park, now a sculpture venue with an international reputation.

== Biography ==
He studied Fine Art and Education, teaching in General, Further and Higher Education. Until 1975 he exhibited frequently and has paintings, drawings and prints in several public and private collections. As Principal Lecturer in Art Education at Bretton Hall College, he founded Yorkshire Sculpture Park.

He has contributed to International Sculpture Center conferences in Chicago, Pittsburgh and Princeton. Recent lectures have included a major Art and Environment conference in Japan, a British Council lecture for the University of Tokyo and a major lecture at the Academy of Fine Arts in Beijing. Public interviews and lectures with artists have included Sir Anthony Caro, Phillip King and Nigel Hall.

Some of the major exhibitions he has organised at Yorkshire Sculpture Park include Henry Moore, Elisabeth Frink, Lynn Chadwick, Barbara Hepworth, Eduardo Chillida, William Turnbull, James Turrell, Isamu Noguchi and Andy Goldsworthy, which won the South Bank Show Award for Visual Arts.

He has organised several overseas projects, including in 1996, a major Karl Prantl exhibition at Schloss Ambras, Innsbruck.

In 1997, he was invited by the city of Florence to organise a Phillip King retrospective at Forte de Belvedere, and in 1998 organised British Contemporary Sculpture at Schloss Ambras and New British Art at Kunstraum, Austria.

In 2000, he organised a major Art and Landscape project at the Gut Holzhausen in Germany. In 2007, he curated Blickachesen 6 at Bad Homburg, Germany which included 22 artists from 8 countries.

He has written articles and reviews for art journals and other publications in the UK and overseas and has contributed to television and radio programmes related to the arts. He has been a judge for the Jerwood Sculpture Prize, the AXA Art/Art Newspaper Catalogue Award, the Northern Arts Prize and the McClleland Sculpture Award in Australia. At present he is an advisor to the Ebbsfleet Landmark Project Commission, which will be one of the biggest artworks in the UK.

== Awards and honours ==
Murray was appointed Officer of the Order of the British Empire (OBE) in 1996, Commander of the Order of the British Empire (CBE) in 2010, and was knighted in the 2022 New Year Honours, all for services to the arts.

In 1988, he was awarded the National Arts Collection Fund Award and in 1989 made Honorary Fellow of the Royal College of Art. was awarded an Honorary DSc from the University of Huddersfield.

He was a member of the Board and Vice President of the International Sculpture Centre in the USA and has been a Trustee of the Marino Marini Museum in Florence, and is a Trustee of

He has an honorary degree from the University of York (2014). He featured in the Sculpture Series Heads, 12 terracotta portraits of contributors to British Sculpture exhibited in 2013.
