= Yorkshire Sculpture Park =

Art gallery in West Yorkshire, England

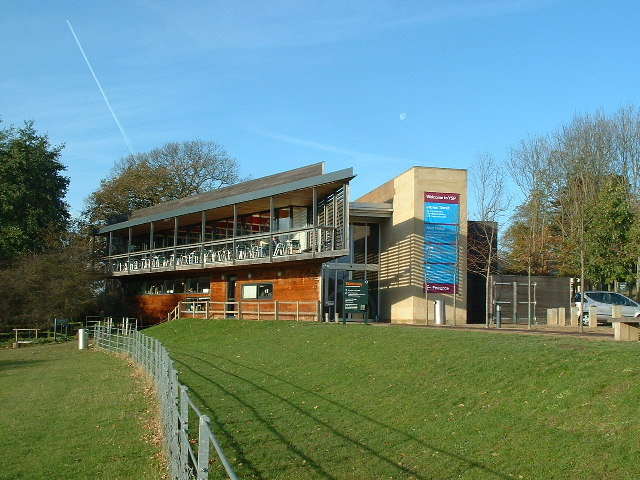
- Yorkshire Sculpture Park visitor centre and restaurant
- Established: 1977
- Location: West Bretton, West Yorkshire, England
- Coordinates: 53.612°N 1.566°W
- Type: Indoor/outdoor art gallery
- Visitors: 250,000 (2011)
- Founder: Peter Murray
- Director: Joe Hill
- Website: ysp.org.uk

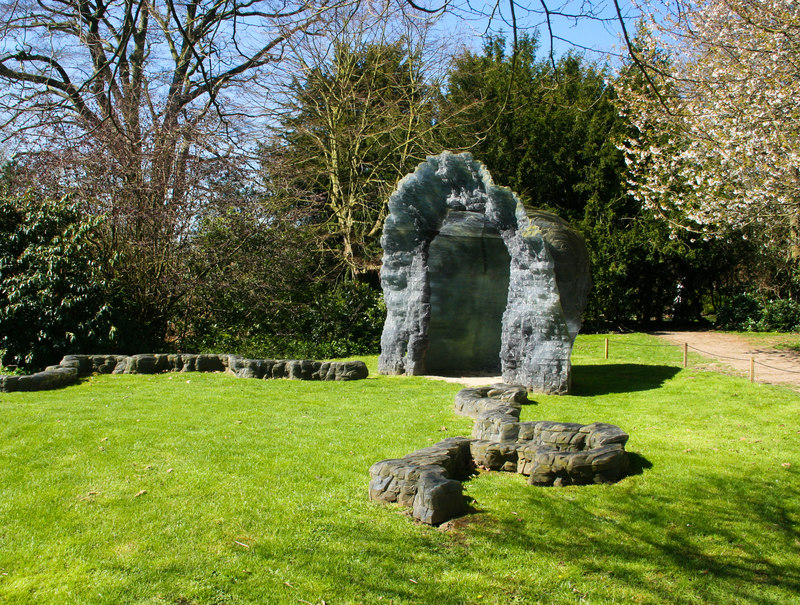
Damski Czepek (polyurethane resin) by Ursula von Rydingsvard, 2015 (see also Madison Square Park)

The Yorkshire Sculpture Park (YSP) is an art gallery, with both open-air and indoor exhibition spaces, in West Bretton, Wakefield, in West Yorkshire, England. It shows work by British and international artists, including Henry Moore and Barbara Hepworth. The sculpture park occupies the 500-acre (200-hectare) parkland of Bretton Hall.

== History ==
The Yorkshire Sculpture Park, opened in 1977, was the UK's first sculpture park based on the temporary open air exhibitions organised in London parks from the 1940s to 1970s by the Arts Council and London County Council (and later Greater London Council).

In 2026 the park appointed Joe Hill as its Chief Executive.

== Exhibition spaces ==
YSP has a number of settings where its collection is displayed. The "gallery without walls" has a changing exhibition programme, rather than permanent display as seen in other UK sculpture parks such as Grizedale Forest.

=== Parkland ===
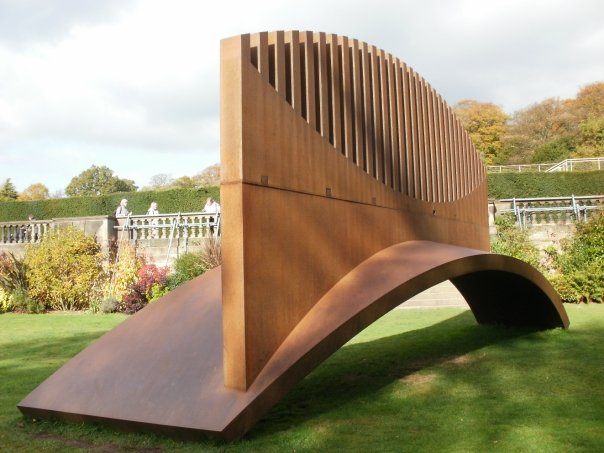
A sculpture by Nigel Hall at YSP

The park is situated in the grounds of Bretton Hall, an 18th-century estate which was a family home until the mid-20th century when it became Bretton Hall College. Follies, landscape features and architectural structures from the 18th century can be seen around the park including the deer park and deer shelter (recently converted by American sculptor James Turrell into an installation), an ice house, and a camellia house. Artists working at YSP, such as Andy Goldsworthy in 2007, take their inspiration from its architectural, historical or natural environment.

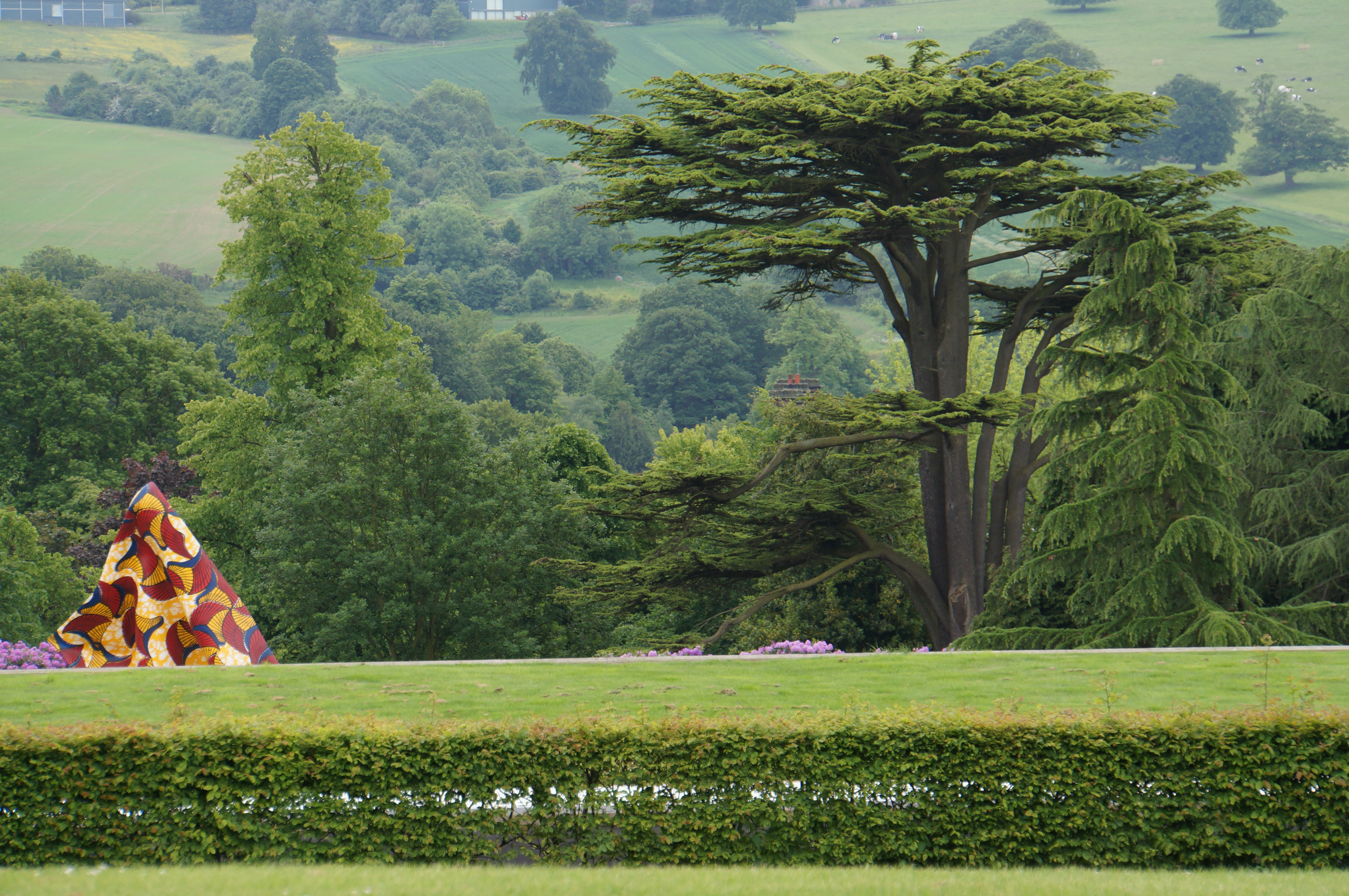
A fragment of a Yinka Shonibare sculpture and YSP landscape

Since the 1990s, YSP has made use of indoor exhibition spaces, initially a Bothy Gallery (in the curved Bothy Wall) and a temporary tent-like structure called the Pavilion Gallery. After an extensive refurbishment and expansion, YSP has added an underground gallery space in the Bothy garden, and exhibition spaces at Longside (the hillside facing the original park). Its programme consists of contemporary and modern sculpture (from Rodin and Bourdelle through to living artists). British sculpture is well represented in the past exhibition programme and semi-permanent installations. Many British sculptors prominent in the 1950s and 1960s have been the subject of solo exhibitions at YSP, including Lynn Chadwick, Austin Wright, Phillip King, Eduardo Paolozzi, Hans Josephsohn, and Kenneth Armitage. Exhibitions tend to be monographic – rather than group or thematic.

The redundant Grade II* listed St Bartholomew's Chapel, West Bretton, built by William Wentworth in 1744, has been restored as gallery space.

=== Longside Gallery ===
Longside Gallery is a space for sculpture overlooking YSP. The gallery is shared with the Arts Council Collection for an alternating programme of exhibitions. Between exhibitions, Longside Gallery is used for educational and outreach activities and events.

=== The Weston ===
In July 2019, the new visitor centre, housing a gallery, restaurant and shop, made the shortlist for the Stirling Prize for excellence in architecture.

== See also ==
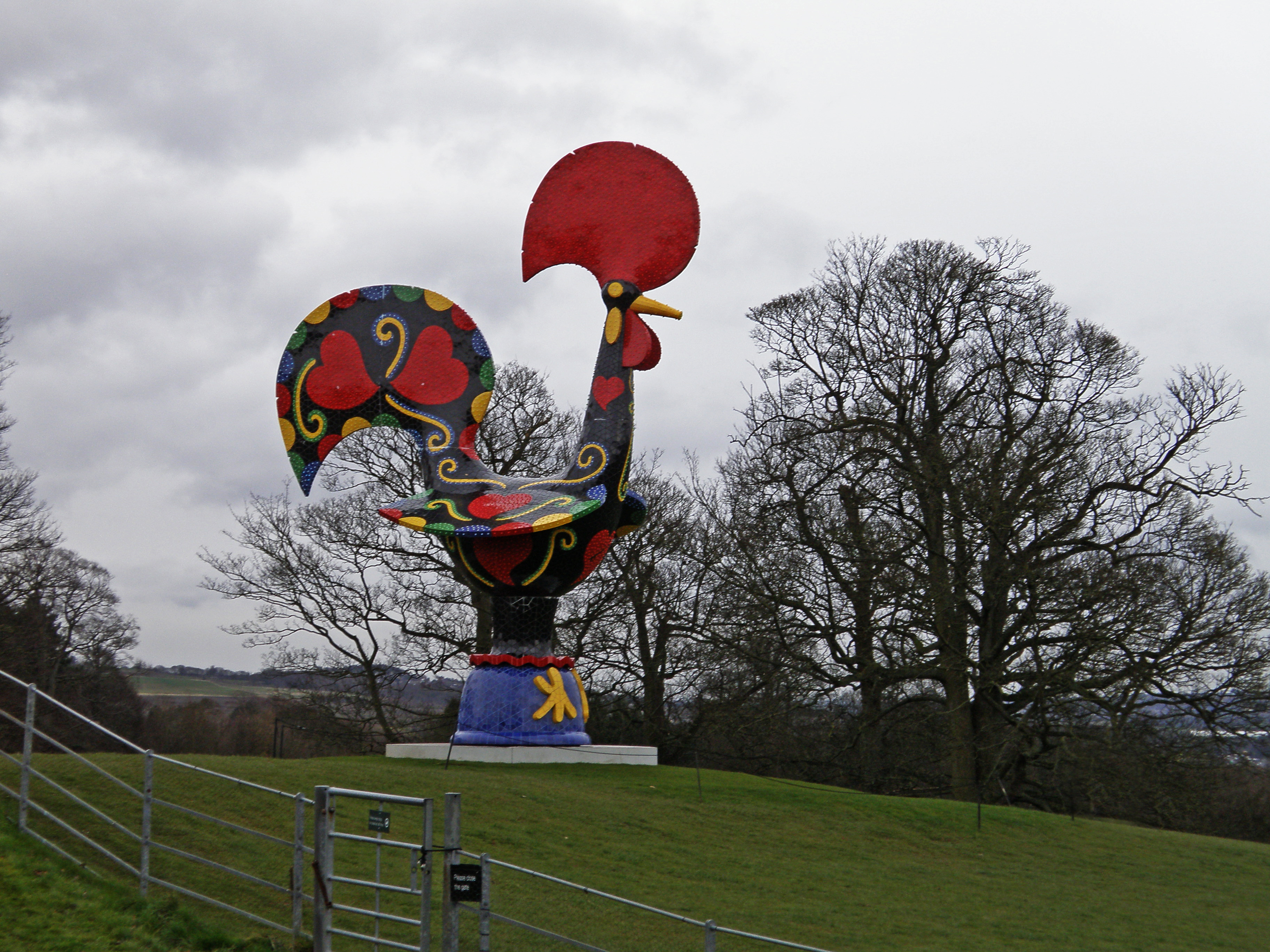
Joana Vasconcelos' Pop Galo (7 March 2020 – 3 January 2021)

- List of sculpture parks
